= List of MPs elected in the 2019 United Kingdom general election =

MPs in the 58th United Kingdom House of Commons

2019–2024 Parliament of the United Kingdom
←	2017–2019 Parliament	2024–present Parliament	→
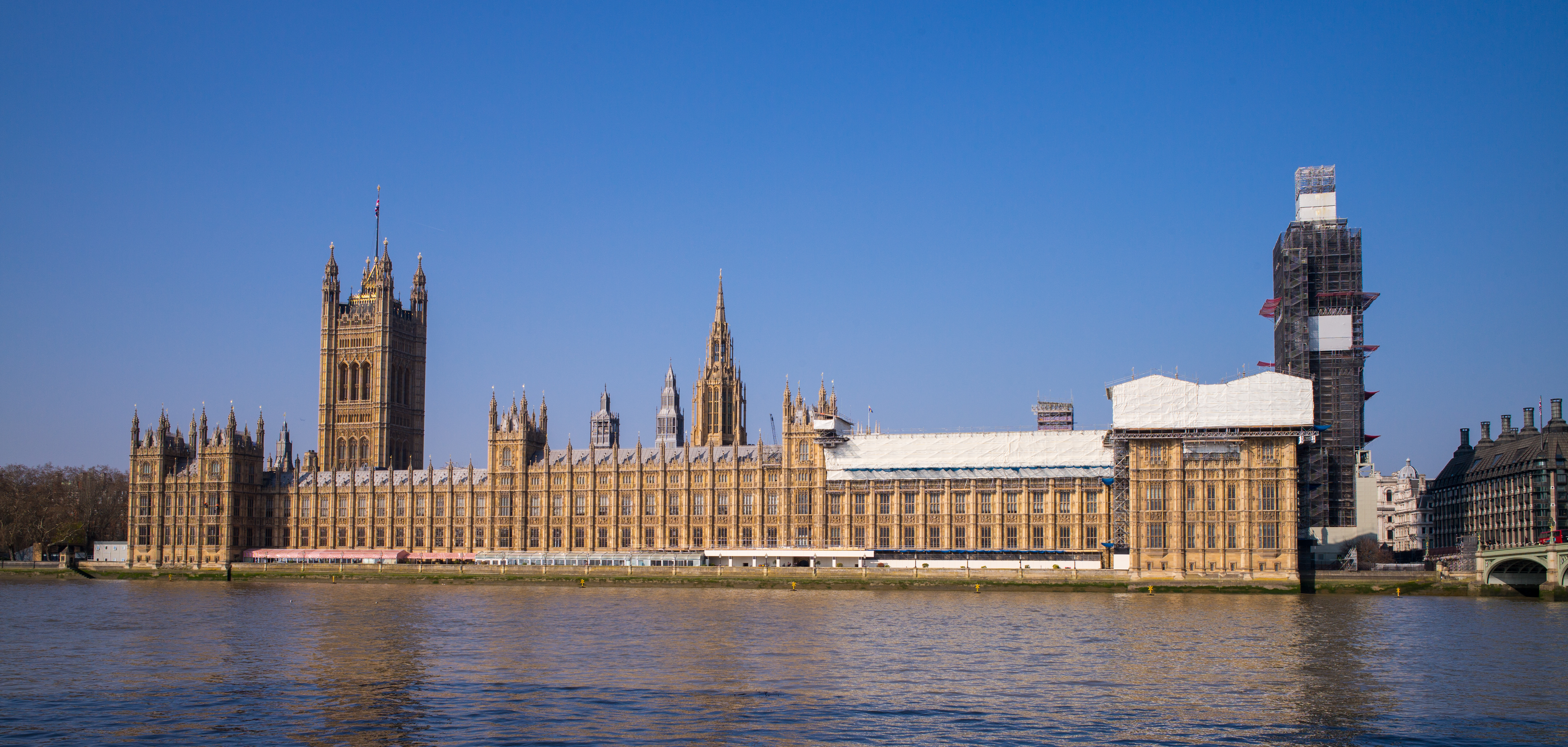
- The Palace of Westminster in 2019

Overview
- Legislative body: Parliament of the United Kingdom
- Meeting place: Palace of Westminster
- Term: 17 December 2019 – 30 May 2024
- Election: 2019 United Kingdom general election
- Government: Sunak ministry (from 25 October 2022); Truss ministry (6 September – 25 October 2022); Second Johnson ministry (until 6 September 2022)

House of Commons
- Members: 650
- Speaker: Sir Lindsay Hoyle
- Leader: Penny Mordaunt (from 6 September 2022); Mark Spencer (8 February – 6 September 2022); Jacob Rees-Mogg (until 8 February 2022)
- Prime Minister: Rishi Sunak (from 25 October 2022); Liz Truss (6 September – 25 October 2022); Boris Johnson (until 6 September 2022)
- Deputy Prime Minister: Oliver Dowden (since 21 April 2023); Thérèse Coffey (6 September – 25 October 2022); Dominic Raab (until 6 September 2022 and 25 October 2022 – 21 April 2023)
- Leader of the Opposition: Sir Keir Starmer; Jeremy Corbyn (until 2020)
- Third-party leader: Stephen Flynn; Ian Blackford (until 2022)

House of Lords
- Members: 789
- Lord Speaker: The Lord McFall of Alcluith; The Lord Fowler (until 2021)
- Leader: The Lord True; The Baroness Evans of Bowes Park (until 2022)
- Leader of the Opposition: The Baroness Smith of Basildon
- Third-party leader: The Lord Newby

Crown-in-Parliament: Charles III; Elizabeth II

Sessions
- 1st: 17 December 2019 – 29 April 2021
- 2nd: 11 May 2021 – 28 April 2022
- 3rd: 10 May 2022 – 26 October 2023
- 4th: 7 November 2023 – 24 May 2024

In the United Kingdom's 2019 general election, 650 members of Parliament (MPs) were elected to the House of Commons – one for each parliamentary constituency.

Parliament consists of the House of Lords and the elected House of Commons. This Parliament first met on 17 December 2019. After the swearing-in of members and the election of Speaker, the State Opening of Parliament took place on 19 December. The 2021 State Opening of Parliament began the second session on 11 May 2021. The 2022 State Opening of Parliament began the third session on 10 May 2022. The 2023 State Opening of Parliament began the fourth session on 7 November 2023. Notable newcomers to enter the House of Commons in this general election included future cabinet ministers Claire Coutinho, Richard Holden and Laura Trott.

The Parliament was marked by extraordinary political turmoil as the governments led by Boris Johnson, Liz Truss and Rishi Sunak had several high-profile political scandals and crises, which led to the Conservative Party seeing a major decrease in their popularity in opinion polling and the Labour Party and Liberal Democrats making gains from Conservatives, often by very wide margins. On 22 May 2024 Sunak announced that the 2024 general election would be held on 4 July. In light of this announcement, the House of Commons was dissolved by King Charles III on 30 May. The King also approved the prorogation of the fourth session, which took place on 24 May.

== House of Commons composition ==
The Conservative Party gained a majority of seats in the 2019 election. The Scottish National Party increased their number of seats and the Social Democratic and Labour Party and the Alliance Party returned to the House of Commons for the first time since their defeats in the 2017 and 2015 general elections respectively. The Labour Party and Democratic Unionists both suffered losses. This table relates to the composition of the House of Commons at the 2019 general election and its dissolution on 30 May 2024 and summarises the changes in party affiliation that took place during the 2019–2024 Parliament.

Affiliation	Members		
Affiliation	Elected in 2019	At dissolution in 2024 (Note: On 29 May 2024, the UK Parliamentary website stated there were 345 Conservative MPs and 205 Labour MPs. However it describes Lloyd Russell-Moyle and Mark Logan as Labour and Conservative MPs respectively at the time of dissolution, despite Logan having defected from the Conservatives and Rusell-Moyle having lost the Labour Party whip prior to dissolution.)	Difference
Conservative	365	344	▼21
Labour (Note: Includes 24 MPs sponsored by the Co-operative Party, who are designated Labour and Co-operative.)	202	205	▲3
SNP	48	43	▼5
Independent	0	17 (Note: At the time of the dissolution of Parliament on 30 May 2024, eight of the independent MPs had been elected as Conservatives at the 2019 general election, including Andrew Bridgen, who defected to Reclaim in May 2023 but left the party in December 2023 and for the remainder of the 2019–2024 Parliament sat as an independent. The remaining nine independent MPs all came from the opposition benches.)	▲17
Liberal Democrats	11	15	▲4
DUP	8	7	▼1
Sinn Féin	7	7	Steady
Plaid Cymru	4	3	▼1
SDLP	2	2	Steady
Alba	Did not exist	2 (Note: Both of the Alba Party's MPs, Kenny MacAskill and Neale Hanvey, were elected for the Scottish National Party (SNP) before leaving to join Alba in 2021.)	▲2
Alliance (NI)	1	1	Steady
Green (E&W)	1	1	Steady
Speaker	1	1	Steady
Reform (Note: Known as the Brexit Party at the 2019 election.)	0	1	▲1
Workers Party	Did not exist	1	▲1
Vacant	0	0	Steady
Total	650	650	Steady
Total voting (Note: In 2019-24, the seven members of Sinn Féin followed a policy of abstentionism. They did not swear into the house, and did not take part in its formal processes (to do so would have compelled a by-election). The speaker and deputy speakers (at this Parliament's dissolution, three Conservative and one Labour) by convention exercise only a casting vote.)	639	638	▼1 (Note: Deputy speaker Eleanor Laing (Con., Chair of Ways and Means) was on an extended leave of absence, and Roger Gale (Con.) served as an additional acting deputy speaker from December 2022 until the end of the Parliament.)
Majority	87	44	▼43

After the 2019 General Election

At dissolution of Parliament

== List of MPs elected ==
24% of the members elected in the 2019 election were elected for the first time, or were not members of the previous parliament.

Constituency	Affiliation of incumbent	Member returned		Notes
Constituency	Affiliation of incumbent		Affiliate	Notes
Aberavon	Labour	Stephen Kinnock	Labour	Seat held
Aberconwy	Conservative	Robin Millar	Conservative	Incumbent, Guto Bebb, did not stand
Aberdeen North	Scottish National	Kirsty Blackman	Scottish National	Seat held
Aberdeen South	Conservative	Stephen Flynn	Scottish National	Incumbent, Ross Thomson, did not stand
Airdrie and Shotts	Scottish National	Neil Gray	Scottish National	Seat held
Aldershot	Conservative	Leo Docherty	Conservative	Seat held
Aldridge-Brownhills	Conservative	Wendy Morton	Conservative	Seat held
Altrincham and Sale West	Conservative	Graham Brady	Conservative	Seat held
Alyn and Deeside	Labour	Mark Tami	Labour	Seat held
Amber Valley	Conservative	Nigel Mills	Conservative	Seat held
Angus	Conservative	Dave Doogan	Scottish National	Defeated incumbent, Kirstene Hair
Arfon	Plaid Cymru	Hywel Williams	Plaid Cymru	Seat held
Argyll and Bute	Scottish National	Brendan O'Hara	Scottish National	Seat held
Arundel and South Downs	Conservative	Andrew Griffith	Conservative	Incumbent, Nick Herbert, did not stand
Ashfield	Labour	Lee Anderson	Conservative	Incumbent, Gloria de Piero, did not stand. Elected as Conservative MP, whip suspended in 2024. Defected to Reform UK on 11 March 2024.
Ashford	Conservative	Damian Green	Conservative	Seat held
Ashton-under-Lyne	Labour	Angela Rayner	Labour	Seat held
Aylesbury	Conservative	Rob Butler	Conservative	Incumbent, David Lidington, did not stand
Ayr, Carrick and Cumnock	Conservative	Allan Dorans	Scottish National	Incumbent, Bill Grant, did not stand
Banbury	Conservative	Victoria Prentis	Conservative	Seat held
Banff and Buchan	Conservative	David Duguid	Conservative	Seat held
Barking	Labour	Margaret Hodge	Labour	Seat held
Barnsley Central	Labour	Dan Jarvis	Labour	Seat held
Barnsley East	Labour	Stephanie Peacock	Labour	Seat held
Barrow and Furness	Independent (The Independents) (Note: MP originally elected as Labour Co-operative.)	Simon Fell	Conservative	Incumbent, John Woodcock, did not stand
Basildon and Billericay	Conservative	John Baron	Conservative	Seat held
Basingstoke	Conservative	Maria Miller	Conservative	Seat held
Bassetlaw	Vacant (Note: MP originally elected as Labour.)	Brendan Clarke-Smith	Conservative	Incumbent, John Mann, did not stand
Bath	Liberal Democrats	Wera Hobhouse	Liberal Democrats	Seat held
Batley and Spen	Labour Co-operative	Tracy Brabin	Labour Co-operative	Seat held
Battersea	Labour	Marsha de Cordova	Labour	Seat held
Beaconsfield	Independent (Note: MP originally elected as Conservative.)	Joy Morrissey	Conservative	Defeated incumbent, Dominic Grieve
Beckenham	Conservative	Bob Stewart	Conservative	Seat held
Bedford	Labour	Mohammad Yasin	Labour	Seat held
Belfast East	DUP	Gavin Robinson	DUP	Seat held
Belfast North	DUP	John Finucane	Sinn Féin	Defeated incumbent, Nigel Dodds
Belfast South	DUP	Claire Hanna	SDLP	Defeated incumbent, Emma Little-Pengelly
Belfast West	Sinn Féin	Paul Maskey	Sinn Féin	Seat held
Bermondsey and Old Southwark	Labour	Neil Coyle	Labour	Seat held
Berwick-upon-Tweed	Conservative	Anne-Marie Trevelyan	Conservative	Seat held
Berwickshire, Roxburgh and Selkirk	Conservative	John Lamont	Conservative	Seat held
Bethnal Green and Bow	Labour	Rushanara Ali	Labour	Seat held
Beverley and Holderness	Conservative	Graham Stuart	Conservative	Seat held
Bexhill and Battle	Conservative	Huw Merriman	Conservative	Seat held
Bexleyheath and Crayford	Conservative	David Evennett	Conservative	Seat held
Birkenhead	Birkenhead Social Justice	Mick Whitley	Labour	Defeated incumbent, Frank Field
Birmingham Edgbaston	Labour Co-operative	Preet Gill	Labour Co-operative	Seat held
Birmingham Erdington	Labour	Jack Dromey	Labour	Seat held
Birmingham Hall Green	Labour	Tahir Ali	Labour	Defeated incumbent, Roger Godsiff
Birmingham Hodge Hill	Labour	Liam Byrne	Labour	Seat held
Birmingham Ladywood	Labour	Shabana Mahmood	Labour	Seat held
Birmingham Northfield	Labour	Gary Sambrook	Conservative	Defeated incumbent, Richard Burden
Birmingham Perry Barr	Labour	Khalid Mahmood	Labour	Seat held
Birmingham Selly Oak	Labour	Steve McCabe	Labour	Seat held
Birmingham Yardley	Labour	Jess Phillips	Labour	Seat held
Bishop Auckland	Labour	Dehenna Davison	Conservative	Defeated incumbent, Helen Goodman
Blackburn	Labour	Kate Hollern	Labour	Seat held
Blackley and Broughton	Labour	Graham Stringer	Labour	Seat held
Blackpool North and Cleveleys	Conservative	Paul Maynard	Conservative	Seat held
Blackpool South	Labour	Scott Benton	Conservative	Defeated incumbent, Gordon Marsden
Blaenau Gwent	Labour	Nick Smith	Labour	Seat held
Blaydon	Labour	Liz Twist	Labour	Seat held
Blyth Valley	Labour	Ian Levy	Conservative	Incumbent, Ronnie Campbell, did not stand
Bognor Regis and Littlehampton	Conservative	Nick Gibb	Conservative	Seat held
Bolsover	Labour	Mark Fletcher	Conservative	Defeated incumbent, Dennis Skinner
Bolton North East	Labour	Mark Logan	Conservative	Defeated incumbent, David Crausby
Bolton South East	Labour	Yasmin Qureshi	Labour	Seat held
Bolton West	Conservative	Chris Green	Conservative	Seat held
Bootle	Labour	Peter Dowd	Labour	Seat held
Boston and Skegness	Conservative	Matt Warman	Conservative	Seat held
Bosworth	Conservative	Luke Evans	Conservative	Incumbent, David Tredinnick, did not stand
Bournemouth East	Conservative	Tobias Ellwood	Conservative	Seat held
Bournemouth West	Conservative	Conor Burns	Conservative	Seat held
Bracknell	Liberal Democrats	James Sunderland	Conservative	Incumbent, Phillip Lee, did not stand
Bradford East	Labour	Imran Hussain	Labour	Seat held; during term suspended and resigned
Bradford South	Labour	Judith Cummins	Labour	Seat held
Bradford West	Labour	Naseem Shah	Labour	Seat held
Braintree	Conservative	James Cleverly	Conservative	Seat held
Brecon and Radnorshire	Liberal Democrats (Note: Seat gained by the Liberal Democrats from the Conservatives at the 2019 Brecon and Radnorshire by-election.)	Fay Jones	Conservative	Defeated incumbent, Jane Dodds
Brent Central	Labour	Dawn Butler	Labour	Seat held
Brent North	Labour	Barry Gardiner	Labour	Seat held
Brentford and Isleworth	Labour	Ruth Cadbury	Labour	Seat held
Brentwood and Ongar	Conservative	Alex Burghart	Conservative	Seat held
Bridgend	Labour	Jamie Wallis	Conservative	Defeated incumbent, Madeleine Moon
Bridgwater and West Somerset	Conservative	Ian Liddell-Grainger	Conservative	Seat held
Brigg and Goole	Conservative	Andrew Percy	Conservative	Seat held
Brighton Kemptown	Labour Co-operative	Lloyd Russell-Moyle	Labour Co-operative	Seat held
Brighton Pavilion	Green	Caroline Lucas	Green	Seat held
Bristol East	Labour	Kerry McCarthy	Labour	Seat held
Bristol North West	Labour	Darren Jones	Labour	Seat held
Bristol South	Labour	Karin Smyth	Labour	Seat held
Bristol West	Labour	Thangam Debbonaire	Labour	Seat held
Broadland	Conservative	Jerome Mayhew	Conservative	Incumbent, Keith Simpson, did not stand
Bromley and Chislehurst	Conservative	Bob Neill	Conservative	Seat held
Bromsgrove	Conservative	Sajid Javid	Conservative	Seat held
Broxbourne	Conservative	Charles Walker	Conservative	Seat held
Broxtowe	Change UK	Darren Henry	Conservative	Defeated incumbent, Anna Soubry
Buckingham	Vacant (Note: MP originally elected as Speaker.)	Greg Smith	Conservative	The preceding incumbent, John Bercow, did not stand
Burnley	Labour	Antony Higginbotham	Conservative	Defeated incumbent, Julie Cooper
Burton	Conservative	Kate Kniveton	Conservative	Incumbent, Andrew Griffiths, did not stand
Bury North	Labour	James Daly	Conservative	Defeated incumbent, James Frith
Bury South	Independent	Christian Wakeford	Conservative	Defeated incumbent, Ivan Lewis
Bury St Edmunds	Conservative	Jo Churchill	Conservative	Seat held
Caerphilly	Labour	Wayne David	Labour	Seat held
Caithness, Sutherland and Easter Ross	Liberal Democrats	Jamie Stone	Liberal Democrats	Seat held
Calder Valley	Conservative	Craig Whittaker	Conservative	Seat held
Camberwell and Peckham	Labour	Harriet Harman	Labour	Seat held
Camborne and Redruth	Conservative	George Eustice	Conservative	Seat held
Cambridge	Labour	Daniel Zeichner	Labour	Seat held
Cannock Chase	Conservative	Amanda Milling	Conservative	Seat held
Canterbury	Labour	Rosie Duffield	Labour	Seat held
Cardiff Central	Labour	Jo Stevens	Labour	Seat held
Cardiff North	Labour	Anna McMorrin	Labour	Seat held
Cardiff South and Penarth	Labour Co-operative	Stephen Doughty	Labour Co-operative	Seat held
Cardiff West	Labour	Kevin Brennan	Labour	Seat held
Carlisle	Conservative	John Stevenson	Conservative	Seat held
Carmarthen East and Dinefwr	Plaid Cymru	Jonathan Edwards	Plaid Cymru	Seat held
Carmarthen West and South Pembrokeshire	Conservative	Simon Hart	Conservative	Seat held
Carshalton and Wallington	Liberal Democrats	Elliot Colburn	Conservative	Defeated incumbent, Tom Brake
Castle Point	Conservative	Rebecca Harris	Conservative	Seat held
Central Ayrshire	Scottish National	Philippa Whitford	Scottish National	Seat held
Central Devon	Conservative	Mel Stride	Conservative	Seat held
Central Suffolk and North Ipswich	Conservative	Dan Poulter	Conservative	Seat held
Ceredigion	Plaid Cymru	Ben Lake	Plaid Cymru	Seat held
Charnwood	Conservative	Edward Argar	Conservative	Seat held
Chatham and Aylesford	Conservative	Tracey Crouch	Conservative	Seat held
Cheadle	Conservative	Mary Robinson	Conservative	Seat held
Chelmsford	Conservative	Vicky Ford	Conservative	Seat held
Chelsea and Fulham	Conservative	Greg Hands	Conservative	Seat held
Cheltenham	Conservative	Alex Chalk	Conservative	Seat held
Chesham and Amersham	Conservative	Cheryl Gillan	Conservative	Seat held
Chesterfield	Labour	Toby Perkins	Labour	Seat held
Chichester	Conservative	Gillian Keegan	Conservative	Seat held
Chingford and Woodford Green	Conservative	Iain Duncan Smith	Conservative	Seat held
Chippenham	Conservative	Michelle Donelan	Conservative	Seat held
Chipping Barnet	Conservative	Theresa Villiers	Conservative	Seat held
Chorley	Speaker	Lindsay Hoyle	Speaker	Seat held
Christchurch	Conservative	Christopher Chope	Conservative	Seat held
Cities of London and Westminster	Conservative	Nickie Aiken	Conservative	Incumbent, Mark Field, did not stand
City of Chester	Labour	Chris Matheson	Labour	Seat held
City of Durham	Labour	Mary Foy	Labour	Incumbent, Roberta Blackman-Woods, did not stand
Clacton	Conservative	Giles Watling	Conservative	Seat held
Cleethorpes	Conservative	Martin Vickers	Conservative	Seat held
Clwyd South	Labour	Simon Baynes	Conservative	Defeated incumbent, Susan Elan Jones
Clwyd West	Conservative	David Jones	Conservative	Seat held
Coatbridge, Chryston and Bellshill	Labour	Steven Bonnar	Scottish National	Defeated incumbent, Hugh Gaffney
Colchester	Conservative	Will Quince	Conservative	Seat held
Colne Valley	Labour	Jason McCartney	Conservative	Defeated incumbent, Thelma Walker
Congleton	Conservative	Fiona Bruce	Conservative	Seat held
Copeland	Conservative	Trudy Harrison	Conservative	Seat held
Corby	Conservative	Tom Pursglove	Conservative	Seat held
Coventry North East	Labour	Colleen Fletcher	Labour	Seat held
Coventry North West	Labour	Taiwo Owatemi	Labour	Incumbent, Geoffrey Robinson, did not stand
Coventry South	Labour	Zarah Sultana	Labour	Incumbent, Jim Cunningham, did not stand
Crawley	Conservative	Henry Smith	Conservative	Seat held
Crewe and Nantwich	Labour	Kieran Mullan	Conservative	Defeated incumbent, Laura Smith
Croydon Central	Labour	Sarah Jones	Labour	Seat held
Croydon North	Labour Co-operative	Steve Reed	Labour Co-operative	Seat held
Croydon South	Conservative	Chris Philp	Conservative	Seat held
Cumbernauld, Kilsyth and Kirkintilloch East	Scottish National	Stuart McDonald	Scottish National	Seat held
Cynon Valley	Labour	Beth Winter	Labour	Incumbent, Ann Clwyd, did not stand
Dagenham and Rainham	Labour	Jon Cruddas	Labour	Seat held
Darlington	Labour	Peter Gibson	Conservative	Defeated incumbent, Jenny Chapman
Dartford	Conservative	Gareth Johnson	Conservative	Seat held
Daventry	Conservative	Chris Heaton-Harris	Conservative	Seat held
Delyn	Labour	Rob Roberts	Conservative	Defeated incumbent, David Hanson
Denton and Reddish	Labour	Andrew Gwynne	Labour	Seat held
Derby North	Independent	Amanda Solloway	Conservative	Defeated incumbent, Chris Williamson
Derby South	Labour	Margaret Beckett	Labour	Seat held
Derbyshire Dales	Conservative	Sarah Dines	Conservative	Incumbent, Patrick McLoughlin, did not stand
Devizes	Conservative	Danny Kruger	Conservative	Incumbent, Claire Perry, did not stand
Dewsbury	Labour	Mark Eastwood	Conservative	Defeated incumbent, Paula Sherriff
Don Valley	Labour	Nicholas Fletcher	Conservative	Defeated incumbent, Caroline Flint
Doncaster Central	Labour	Rosie Winterton	Labour	Seat held
Doncaster North	Labour	Ed Miliband	Labour	Seat held
Dover	Independent	Natalie Elphicke	Conservative	Incumbent, Charlie Elphicke, did not stand
Dudley North	Independent	Marco Longhi	Conservative	Incumbent, Ian Austin, did not stand
Dudley South	Conservative	Mike Wood	Conservative	Seat held
Dulwich and West Norwood	Labour	Helen Hayes	Labour	Seat held
Dumfries and Galloway	Conservative	Alister Jack	Conservative	Seat held
Dumfriesshire, Clydesdale and Tweeddale	Conservative	David Mundell	Conservative	Seat held
Dundee East	Scottish National	Stewart Hosie	Scottish National	Seat held
Dundee West	Scottish National	Chris Law	Scottish National	Seat held
Dunfermline and West Fife	Scottish National	Douglas Chapman	Scottish National	Seat held
Dwyfor Meirionnydd	Plaid Cymru	Liz Saville-Roberts	Plaid Cymru	Seat held
Ealing Central and Acton	Labour	Rupa Huq	Labour	Seat held
Ealing North	Labour	James Murray	Labour Co-operative	Incumbent, Stephen Pound, did not stand
Ealing Southall	Labour	Virendra Sharma	Labour	Seat held
Easington	Labour	Grahame Morris	Labour	Seat held
East Antrim	DUP	Sammy Wilson	DUP	Seat held
East Devon	Conservative	Simon Jupp	Conservative	Incumbent, Hugo Swire, did not stand
East Dunbartonshire	Liberal Democrats	Amy Callaghan	Scottish National	Defeated incumbent, Jo Swinson
East Ham	Labour	Stephen Timms	Labour	Seat held
East Hampshire	Conservative	Damian Hinds	Conservative	Seat held
East Kilbride, Strathaven and Lesmahagow	Scottish National	Lisa Cameron	Scottish National	Seat held
East Londonderry	DUP	Gregory Campbell	DUP	Seat held
East Lothian	Labour	Kenny MacAskill	Scottish National	Defeated incumbent, Martin Whitfield
East Renfrewshire	Conservative	Kirsten Oswald	Scottish National	Defeated incumbent, Paul Masterton
East Surrey	Liberal Democrats	Claire Coutinho	Conservative	Incumbent, Sam Gyimah, did not stand
East Worthing and Shoreham	Conservative	Tim Loughton	Conservative	Seat held
East Yorkshire	Conservative	Greg Knight	Conservative	Seat held
Eastbourne	Liberal Democrats	Caroline Ansell	Conservative	Defeated incumbent, Stephen Lloyd
Eastleigh	Conservative	Paul Holmes	Conservative	Incumbent, Mims Davies, stood for Mid Sussex
Eddisbury	Liberal Democrats	Edward Timpson	Conservative	Defeated incumbent, Antoinette Sandbach
Edinburgh East	Scottish National	Tommy Sheppard	Scottish National	Seat held
Edinburgh North and Leith	Scottish National	Deidre Brock	Scottish National	Seat held
Edinburgh South	Labour	Ian Murray	Labour	Seat held
Edinburgh South West	Scottish National	Joanna Cherry	Scottish National	Seat held
Edinburgh West	Liberal Democrats	Christine Jardine	Liberal Democrats	Seat held
Edmonton	Labour Co-operative	Kate Osamor	Labour Co-operative	Seat held
Ellesmere Port and Neston	Labour	Justin Madders	Labour	Seat held
Elmet and Rothwell	Conservative	Alec Shelbrooke	Conservative	Seat held
Eltham	Labour	Clive Efford	Labour	Seat held
Enfield North	Change UK	Feryal Clark	Labour	Incumbent, Joan Ryan, did not stand
Enfield Southgate	Labour	Bambos Charalambous	Labour	Seat held
Epping Forest	Conservative	Eleanor Laing	Conservative	Seat held
Epsom and Ewell	Conservative	Chris Grayling	Conservative	Seat held
Erewash	Conservative	Maggie Throup	Conservative	Seat held
Erith and Thamesmead	Labour	Abena Oppong-Asare	Labour	Incumbent, Teresa Pearce, did not stand
Esher and Walton	Conservative	Dominic Raab	Conservative	Seat held
Exeter	Labour	Ben Bradshaw	Labour	Seat held
Falkirk	Scottish National	John McNally	Scottish National	Seat held
Fareham	Conservative	Suella Braverman	Conservative	Seat held
Faversham and Mid Kent	Conservative	Helen Whately	Conservative	Seat held
Feltham and Heston	Labour Co-operative	Seema Malhotra	Labour Co-operative	Seat held
Fermanagh and South Tyrone	Sinn Féin	Michelle Gildernew	Sinn Féin	Seat held
Filton and Bradley Stoke	Conservative	Jack Lopresti	Conservative	Seat held
Finchley and Golders Green	Conservative	Mike Freer	Conservative	Seat held
Folkestone and Hythe	Conservative	Damian Collins	Conservative	Seat held
Forest of Dean	Conservative	Mark Harper	Conservative	Seat held
Foyle	Sinn Féin	Colum Eastwood	SDLP	Defeated incumbent, Elisha McCallion
Fylde	Conservative	Mark Menzies	Conservative	Seat held
Gainsborough	Conservative	Edward Leigh	Conservative	Seat held
Garston and Halewood	Labour	Maria Eagle	Labour	Seat held
Gateshead	Labour	Ian Mearns	Labour	Seat held
Gedling	Labour	Tom Randall	Conservative	Defeated incumbent, Vernon Coaker
Gillingham and Rainham	Conservative	Rehman Chishti	Conservative	Seat held
Glasgow Central	Scottish National	Alison Thewliss	Scottish National	Seat held
Glasgow East	Scottish National	David Linden	Scottish National	Seat held
Glasgow North	Scottish National	Patrick Grady	Scottish National	Seat held
Glasgow North East	Labour Co-operative	Anne McLaughlin	Scottish National	Defeated incumbent, Paul Sweeney
Glasgow North West	Scottish National	Carol Monaghan	Scottish National	Seat held
Glasgow South	Scottish National	Stewart McDonald	Scottish National	Seat held
Glasgow South West	Scottish National	Chris Stephens	Scottish National	Seat held
Glenrothes	Scottish National	Peter Grant	Scottish National	Seat held
Gloucester	Conservative	Richard Graham	Conservative	Seat held
Gordon	Conservative	Richard Thomson	Scottish National	Defeated incumbent, Colin Clark
Gosport	Conservative	Caroline Dinenage	Conservative	Seat held
Gower	Labour	Tonia Antoniazzi	Labour	Seat held
Grantham and Stamford	Independent	Gareth Davies	Conservative	Incumbent, Nick Boles, did not stand
Gravesham	Conservative	Adam Holloway	Conservative	Seat held
Great Grimsby	Labour	Lia Nici	Conservative	Defeated incumbent, Melanie Onn
Great Yarmouth	Conservative	Brandon Lewis	Conservative	Seat held
Greenwich and Woolwich	Labour	Matthew Pennycook	Labour	Seat held
Guildford	Independent	Angela Richardson	Conservative	Defeated incumbent, Anne Milton
Hackney North and Stoke Newington	Labour	Diane Abbott	Labour	Seat held
Hackney South and Shoreditch	Labour Co-operative	Meg Hillier	Labour Co-operative	Seat held
Halesowen and Rowley Regis	Conservative	James Morris	Conservative	Seat held
Halifax	Labour	Holly Lynch	Labour	Seat held
Haltemprice and Howden	Conservative	David Davis	Conservative	Seat held
Halton	Labour	Derek Twigg	Labour	Seat held
Hammersmith	Labour	Andrew Slaughter	Labour	Seat held
Hampstead and Kilburn	Labour	Tulip Siddiq	Labour	Seat held
Harborough	Conservative	Neil O'Brien	Conservative	Seat held
Harlow	Conservative	Robert Halfon	Conservative	Seat held
Harrogate and Knaresborough	Conservative	Andrew Jones	Conservative	Seat held
Harrow East	Conservative	Bob Blackman	Conservative	Seat held
Harrow West	Labour Co-operative	Gareth Thomas	Labour Co-operative	Seat held
Hartlepool	Labour	Mike Hill	Labour	Seat held
Harwich and North Essex	Conservative	Bernard Jenkin	Conservative	Seat held
Hastings and Rye	Independent	Sally-Ann Hart	Conservative	Incumbent, Amber Rudd, did not stand
Havant	Conservative	Alan Mak	Conservative	Seat held
Hayes and Harlington	Labour	John McDonnell	Labour	Seat held
Hazel Grove	Conservative	William Wragg	Conservative	Seat held
Hemel Hempstead	Conservative	Mike Penning	Conservative	Seat held
Hemsworth	Labour	Jon Trickett	Labour	Seat held
Hendon	Conservative	Matthew Offord	Conservative	Seat held
Henley	Conservative	John Howell	Conservative	Seat held
Hereford and South Herefordshire	Conservative	Jesse Norman	Conservative	Seat held
Hertford and Stortford	Conservative	Julie Marson	Conservative	Incumbent, Mark Prisk, did not stand
Hertsmere	Conservative	Oliver Dowden	Conservative	Seat held
Hexham	Conservative	Guy Opperman	Conservative	Seat held
Heywood and Middleton	Labour	Chris Clarkson	Conservative	Defeated incumbent, Liz McInnes
High Peak	Labour	Robert Largan	Conservative	Defeated incumbent, Ruth George
Hitchin and Harpenden	Conservative	Bim Afolami	Conservative	Seat held
Holborn and St Pancras	Labour	Keir Starmer	Labour	Seat held
Hornchurch and Upminster	Conservative	Julia Lopez	Conservative	Seat held
Hornsey and Wood Green	Labour	Catherine West	Labour	Seat held
Horsham	Conservative	Jeremy Quin	Conservative	Seat held
Houghton and Sunderland South	Labour	Bridget Phillipson	Labour	Seat held
Hove	Labour	Peter Kyle	Labour	Seat held
Huddersfield	Labour Co-operative	Barry Sheerman	Labour Co-operative	Seat held
Huntingdon	Conservative	Jonathan Djanogly	Conservative	Seat held
Hyndburn	Labour	Sara Britcliffe	Conservative	Defeated incumbent, Graham Jones
Ilford North	Labour	Wes Streeting	Labour	Seat held
Ilford South	Change UK	Sam Tarry	Labour	Defeated incumbent, Mike Gapes
Inverclyde	Scottish National	Ronnie Cowan	Scottish National	Seat held
Inverness, Nairn, Badenoch and Strathspey	Scottish National	Drew Hendry	Scottish National	Seat held
Ipswich	Labour	Tom Hunt	Conservative	Defeated incumbent, Sandy Martin
Isle of Wight	Conservative	Bob Seely	Conservative	Seat held
Islington North	Labour	Jeremy Corbyn	Labour	Seat held
Islington South and Finsbury	Labour	Emily Thornberry	Labour	Seat held
Islwyn	Labour Co-operative	Chris Evans	Labour Co-operative	Seat held
Jarrow	Labour	Kate Osborne	Labour	Incumbent, Stephen Hepburn, did not stand
Keighley	Labour	Robbie Moore	Conservative	Defeated incumbent, John Grogan
Kenilworth and Southam	Conservative	Jeremy Wright	Conservative	Seat held
Kensington	Labour	Felicity Buchan	Conservative	Defeated incumbent, Emma Dent Coad
Kettering	Conservative	Philip Hollobone	Conservative	Seat held
Kilmarnock and Loudoun	Scottish National	Alan Brown	Scottish National	Seat held
Kingston and Surbiton	Liberal Democrats	Edward Davey	Liberal Democrats	Seat held
Kingston upon Hull East	Labour	Karl Turner	Labour	Seat held
Kingston upon Hull North	Labour	Diana Johnson	Labour	Seat held
Kingston upon Hull West and Hessle	Labour	Emma Hardy	Labour	Seat held
Kingswood	Conservative	Chris Skidmore	Conservative	Seat held
Kirkcaldy and Cowdenbeath	Labour	Neale Hanvey	Scottish National (Note: Hanvey was suspended by the SNP and disowned as a candidate on 28 November 2019, after the close of nominations, pending an investigation over alleged antisemitism. He was subsequently elected as an SNP MP, but sat as an independent until 29 May 2020 while an investigation was under way.)	Defeated incumbent, Lesley Laird
Knowsley	Labour	George Howarth	Labour	Seat held
Lagan Valley	DUP	Jeffrey Donaldson	DUP	Seat held
Lanark and Hamilton East	Scottish National	Angela Crawley	Scottish National	Seat held
Lancaster and Fleetwood	Labour	Cat Smith	Labour	Seat held
Leeds Central	Labour	Hilary Benn	Labour	Seat held
Leeds East	Labour	Richard Burgon	Labour	Seat held
Leeds North East	Labour	Fabian Hamilton	Labour	Seat held
Leeds North West	Labour Co-operative	Alex Sobel	Labour Co-operative	Seat held
Leeds West	Labour	Rachel Reeves	Labour	Seat held
Leicester East	Labour	Claudia Webbe	Labour	Incumbent, Keith Vaz, did not stand
Leicester South	Labour Co-operative	Jon Ashworth	Labour Co-operative	Seat held
Leicester West	Labour	Liz Kendall	Labour	Seat held
Leigh	Labour Co-operative	James Grundy	Conservative	Defeated incumbent, Joanne Platt
Lewes	Conservative	Maria Caulfield	Conservative	Seat held
Lewisham East	Labour	Janet Daby	Labour	Seat held
Lewisham West and Penge	Labour	Ellie Reeves	Labour	Seat held
Lewisham Deptford	Labour	Vicky Foxcroft	Labour	Seat held
Leyton and Wanstead	Labour	John Cryer	Labour	Seat held
Lichfield	Conservative	Michael Fabricant	Conservative	Seat held
Lincoln	Labour	Karl McCartney	Conservative	Defeated incumbent, Karen Lee
Linlithgow and East Falkirk	Scottish National	Martyn Day	Scottish National	Seat held
Liverpool Riverside	Independent	Kim Johnson	Labour	Incumbent, Louise Ellman, did not stand
Liverpool Walton	Labour	Dan Carden	Labour	Seat held
Liverpool Wavertree	Liberal Democrats	Paula Barker	Labour	Incumbent, Luciana Berger, did not stand
Liverpool West Derby	Labour Co-operative	Ian Byrne	Labour	Incumbent, Stephen Twigg, did not stand
Livingston	Scottish National	Hannah Bardell	Scottish National	Seat held
Llanelli	Labour	Nia Griffith	Labour	Seat held
Loughborough	Conservative	Jane Hunt	Conservative	Incumbent, Nicky Morgan, did not stand
Louth and Horncastle	Conservative	Victoria Atkins	Conservative	Seat held
Ludlow	Conservative	Philip Dunne	Conservative	Seat held
Luton North	Independent	Sarah Owen	Labour	Incumbent, Kelvin Hopkins, did not stand
Luton South	Independent (The Independents)	Rachel Hopkins	Labour	Defeated incumbent, Gavin Shuker
Macclesfield	Conservative	David Rutley	Conservative	Seat held
Maidenhead	Conservative	Theresa May	Conservative	Seat held
Maidstone and The Weald	Conservative	Helen Grant	Conservative	Seat held
Makerfield	Labour	Yvonne Fovargue	Labour	Seat held
Maldon	Conservative	John Whittingdale	Conservative	Seat held
Manchester Central	Labour Co-operative	Lucy Powell	Labour Co-operative	Seat held
Manchester Gorton	Labour	Afzal Khan	Labour	Seat held
Manchester Withington	Labour	Jeff Smith	Labour	Seat held
Mansfield	Conservative	Ben Bradley	Conservative	Seat held
Meon Valley	Conservative	Flick Drummond	Conservative	Incumbent, George Hollingbery, did not stand
Meriden	Conservative	Saqib Bhatti	Conservative	Incumbent, Caroline Spelman, did not stand
Merthyr Tydfil and Rhymney	Labour	Gerald Jones	Labour	Seat held
Mid Bedfordshire	Conservative	Nadine Dorries	Conservative	Seat held
Mid Derbyshire	Conservative	Pauline Latham	Conservative	Seat held
Mid Dorset and North Poole	Conservative	Michael Tomlinson	Conservative	Seat held
Mid Norfolk	Conservative	George Freeman	Conservative	Seat held
Mid Sussex	Conservative	Mims Davies	Conservative	Incumbent, Nicholas Soames, did not stand. Davies was previously MP for Eastleigh
Mid Ulster	Sinn Féin	Francie Molloy	Sinn Féin	Seat held
Mid Worcestershire	Conservative	Nigel Huddleston	Conservative	Seat held
Middlesbrough	Labour	Andy McDonald	Labour	Seat held
Middlesbrough South and East Cleveland	Conservative	Simon Clarke	Conservative	Seat held
Midlothian	Labour	Owen Thompson	Scottish National	Defeated incumbent, Danielle Rowley
Milton Keynes North	Conservative	Ben Everitt	Conservative	Incumbent, Mark Lancaster, did not stand
Milton Keynes South	Conservative	Iain Stewart	Conservative	Seat held
Mitcham and Morden	Labour	Siobhain McDonagh	Labour	Seat held
Mole Valley	Conservative	Paul Beresford	Conservative	Seat held
Monmouth	Conservative	David Davies	Conservative	Seat held
Montgomeryshire	Conservative	Craig Williams	Conservative	Incumbent, Glyn Davies, did not stand
Moray	Conservative	Douglas Ross	Conservative	Seat held
Morecambe and Lunesdale	Conservative	David Morris	Conservative	Seat held
Morley and Outwood	Conservative	Andrea Jenkyns	Conservative	Seat held
Motherwell and Wishaw	Scottish National	Marion Fellows	Scottish National	Seat held
Na h-Eileanan an Iar	Scottish National	Angus MacNeil	Scottish National	Seat held
Neath	Labour Co-operative	Christina Rees	Labour Co-operative	Seat held
New Forest East	Conservative	Julian Lewis	Conservative	Seat held
New Forest West	Conservative	Desmond Swayne	Conservative	Seat held
Newark	Conservative	Robert Jenrick	Conservative	Seat held
Newbury	Conservative	Laura Farris	Conservative	Incumbent, Richard Benyon, did not stand
Newcastle upon Tyne Central	Labour	Chi Onwurah	Labour	Seat held
Newcastle upon Tyne East	Labour	Nick Brown	Labour	Seat held
Newcastle upon Tyne North	Labour	Catherine McKinnell	Labour	Seat held
Newcastle-under-Lyme	Labour	Aaron Bell	Conservative	Incumbent, Paul Farrelly, did not stand
Newport East	Labour	Jessica Morden	Labour	Seat held
Newport West	Labour	Ruth Jones	Labour	Seat held
Newry and Armagh	Sinn Féin	Mickey Brady	Sinn Féin	Seat held
Newton Abbot	Conservative	Anne Marie Morris	Conservative	Seat held
Normanton, Pontefract and Castleford	Labour	Yvette Cooper	Labour	Seat held
North Antrim	DUP	Ian Paisley	DUP	Seat held
North Ayrshire and Arran	Scottish National	Patricia Gibson	Scottish National	Seat held
North Cornwall	Conservative	Scott Mann	Conservative	Seat held
North Devon	Conservative	Selaine Saxby	Conservative	Incumbent, Peter Heaton-Jones, did not stand
North Dorset	Conservative	Simon Hoare	Conservative	Seat held
North Down	Independent	Stephen Farry	Alliance	Incumbent, Sylvia Hermon, did not stand
North Durham	Labour	Kevan Jones	Labour	Seat held
North East Bedfordshire	Conservative	Richard Fuller	Conservative	Incumbent, Alistair Burt, did not stand
North East Cambridgeshire	Conservative	Steve Barclay	Conservative	Seat held
North East Derbyshire	Conservative	Lee Rowley	Conservative	Seat held
North East Fife	Scottish National	Wendy Chamberlain	Liberal Democrats	Defeated incumbent, Stephen Gethins
North East Hampshire	Conservative	Ranil Jayawardena	Conservative	Seat held
North East Hertfordshire	Conservative	Oliver Heald	Conservative	Seat held
North East Somerset	Conservative	Jacob Rees-Mogg	Conservative	Seat held
North Herefordshire	Conservative	Bill Wiggin	Conservative	Seat held
North Norfolk	Liberal Democrats	Duncan Baker	Conservative	Incumbent, Norman Lamb, did not stand
North Shropshire	Conservative	Owen Paterson	Conservative	Seat held
North Somerset	Conservative	Liam Fox	Conservative	Seat held
North Swindon	Conservative	Justin Tomlinson	Conservative	Seat held
North Thanet	Conservative	Roger Gale	Conservative	Seat held
North Tyneside	Labour	Mary Glindon	Labour	Seat held
North Warwickshire	Conservative	Craig Tracey	Conservative	Seat held
North West Cambridgeshire	Conservative	Shailesh Vara	Conservative	Seat held
North West Durham	Labour	Richard Holden	Conservative	Defeated incumbent, Laura Pidcock
North West Hampshire	Conservative	Kit Malthouse	Conservative	Seat held
North West Leicestershire	Conservative	Andrew Bridgen	Conservative	Seat held
North West Norfolk	Conservative	James Wild	Conservative	Incumbent, Henry Bellingham, did not stand
North Wiltshire	Conservative	James Gray	Conservative	Seat held
Northampton North	Conservative	Michael Ellis	Conservative	Seat held
Northampton South	Conservative	Andrew Lewer	Conservative	Seat held
Norwich North	Conservative	Chloe Smith	Conservative	Seat held
Norwich South	Labour	Clive Lewis	Labour	Seat held
Nottingham East	Change UK	Nadia Whittome	Labour	Defeated incumbent, Chris Leslie
Nottingham North	Labour Co-operative	Alex Norris	Labour Co-operative	Seat held
Nottingham South	Labour	Lilian Greenwood	Labour	Seat held
Nuneaton	Conservative	Marcus Jones	Conservative	Seat held
Ochil and South Perthshire	Conservative	John Nicolson	Scottish National	Defeated incumbent, Luke Graham
Ogmore	Labour	Chris Elmore	Labour	Seat held
Old Bexley and Sidcup	Conservative	James Brokenshire	Conservative	Seat held
Oldham East and Saddleworth	Labour	Debbie Abrahams	Labour	Seat held
Oldham West and Royton	Labour Co-operative	Jim McMahon	Labour Co-operative	Seat held
Orkney and Shetland	Liberal Democrats	Alistair Carmichael	Liberal Democrats	Seat held
Orpington	Conservative	Gareth Bacon	Conservative	Incumbent, Jo Johnson, did not stand
Oxford East	Labour Co-operative	Anneliese Dodds	Labour Co-operative	Seat held
Oxford West and Abingdon	Liberal Democrats	Layla Moran	Liberal Democrats	Seat held
Paisley and Renfrewshire North	Scottish National	Gavin Newlands	Scottish National	Seat held
Paisley and Renfrewshire South	Scottish National	Mhairi Black	Scottish National	Seat held
Pendle	Conservative	Andrew Stephenson	Conservative	Seat held
Penistone and Stocksbridge	Liberal Democrats	Miriam Cates	Conservative	Incumbent, Angela Smith, did not stand
Penrith and The Border	Independent	Neil Hudson	Conservative	Incumbent, Rory Stewart, did not stand
Perth and North Perthshire	Scottish National	Pete Wishart	Scottish National	Seat held
Peterborough	Labour	Paul Bristow	Conservative	Defeated incumbent, Lisa Forbes
Plymouth Moor View	Conservative	Johnny Mercer	Conservative	Seat held
Plymouth Sutton and Devonport	Labour Co-operative	Luke Pollard	Labour Co-operative	Seat held
Pontypridd	Labour	Alex Davies-Jones	Labour	Incumbent, Owen Smith, did not stand
Poole	Conservative	Robert Syms	Conservative	Seat held
Poplar and Limehouse	Labour	Apsana Begum	Labour	Incumbent, Jim Fitzpatrick, did not stand
Portsmouth North	Conservative	Penny Mordaunt	Conservative	Seat held
Portsmouth South	Labour	Stephen Morgan	Labour	Seat held
Preseli Pembrokeshire	Conservative	Stephen Crabb	Conservative	Seat held
Preston	Labour Co-operative	Mark Hendrick	Labour Co-operative	Seat held
Pudsey	Conservative	Stuart Andrew	Conservative	Seat held
Putney	Independent	Fleur Anderson	Labour	Incumbent, Justine Greening, did not stand
Rayleigh and Wickford	Conservative	Mark Francois	Conservative	Seat held
Reading East	Labour	Matt Rodda	Labour	Seat held
Reading West	Conservative	Alok Sharma	Conservative	Seat held
Redcar	Labour Co-operative	Jacob Young	Conservative	Defeated incumbent, Anna Turley
Redditch	Conservative	Rachel Maclean	Conservative	Seat held
Reigate	Conservative	Crispin Blunt	Conservative	Seat held
Rhondda	Labour	Chris Bryant	Labour	Seat held
Ribble Valley	Conservative	Nigel Evans	Conservative	Seat held
Richmond (Yorks)	Conservative	Rishi Sunak	Conservative	Seat held
Richmond Park	Conservative	Sarah Olney	Liberal Democrats	Defeated incumbent, Zac Goldsmith
Rochdale	Labour	Tony Lloyd	Labour	Seat held
Rochester and Strood	Conservative	Kelly Tolhurst	Conservative	Seat held
Rochford and Southend East	Conservative	James Duddridge	Conservative	Seat held
Romford	Conservative	Andrew Rosindell	Conservative	Seat held
Romsey and Southampton North	Conservative	Caroline Nokes	Conservative	Seat held
Ross, Skye and Lochaber	Scottish National	Ian Blackford	Scottish National	Seat held
Rossendale and Darwen	Conservative	Jake Berry	Conservative	Seat held
Rother Valley	Labour	Alexander Stafford	Conservative	Incumbent, Kevin Barron, did not stand
Rotherham	Labour	Sarah Champion	Labour	Seat held
Rugby	Conservative	Mark Pawsey	Conservative	Seat held
Ruislip, Northwood and Pinner	Conservative	David Simmonds	Conservative	Incumbent, Nick Hurd, did not stand
Runnymede and Weybridge	Independent	Ben Spencer	Conservative	Incumbent, Philip Hammond, did not stand
Rushcliffe	Independent	Ruth Edwards	Conservative	Incumbent, Ken Clarke, did not stand
Rutherglen and Hamilton West	Labour Co-operative	Margaret Ferrier	Scottish National	Defeated incumbent, Gerard Killen
Rutland and Melton	Conservative	Alicia Kearns	Conservative	Incumbent, Alan Duncan, did not stand
Saffron Walden	Conservative	Kemi Badenoch	Conservative	Seat held
Salford and Eccles	Labour	Rebecca Long-Bailey	Labour	Seat held
Salisbury	Conservative	John Glen	Conservative	Seat held
Scarborough and Whitby	Conservative	Robert Goodwill	Conservative	Seat held
Scunthorpe	Labour	Holly Mumby-Croft	Conservative	Defeated incumbent, Nic Dakin
Sedgefield	Labour	Paul Howell	Conservative	Defeated incumbent, Phil Wilson
Sefton Central	Labour	Bill Esterson	Labour	Seat held
Selby and Ainsty	Conservative	Nigel Adams	Conservative	Seat held
Sevenoaks	Conservative	Laura Trott	Conservative	Incumbent, Michael Fallon, did not stand
Sheffield Central	Labour	Paul Blomfield	Labour	Seat held
Sheffield South East	Labour	Clive Betts	Labour	Seat held
Sheffield Brightside and Hillsborough	Labour	Gill Furniss	Labour	Seat held
Sheffield Hallam	Independent	Olivia Blake	Labour	Incumbent, Jared O'Mara, did not stand
Sheffield Heeley	Labour	Louise Haigh	Labour	Seat held
Sherwood	Conservative	Mark Spencer	Conservative	Seat held
Shipley	Conservative	Philip Davies	Conservative	Seat held
Shrewsbury and Atcham	Conservative	Daniel Kawczynski	Conservative	Seat held
Sittingbourne and Sheppey	Conservative	Gordon Henderson	Conservative	Seat held
Skipton and Ripon	Conservative	Julian Smith	Conservative	Seat held
Sleaford and North Hykeham	Conservative	Caroline Johnson	Conservative	Seat held
Slough	Labour	Tanmanjeet Dhesi	Labour	Seat held
Solihull	Conservative	Julian Knight	Conservative	Seat held
Somerton and Frome	Conservative	David Warburton	Conservative	Seat held
South Antrim	DUP	Paul Girvan	DUP	Seat held
South Basildon and East Thurrock	Conservative	Stephen Metcalfe	Conservative	Seat held
South Cambridgeshire	Liberal Democrats	Anthony Browne	Conservative	Incumbent, Heidi Allen, did not stand
South Derbyshire	Conservative	Heather Wheeler	Conservative	Seat held
South Dorset	Conservative	Richard Drax	Conservative	Seat held
South Down	Sinn Féin	Chris Hazzard	Sinn Féin	Seat held
South East Cambridgeshire	Conservative	Lucy Frazer	Conservative	Seat held
South East Cornwall	Conservative	Sheryll Murray	Conservative	Seat held
South Holland and The Deepings	Conservative	John Hayes	Conservative	Seat held
South Leicestershire	Conservative	Alberto Costa	Conservative	Seat held
South Norfolk	Conservative	Richard Bacon	Conservative	Seat held
South Northamptonshire	Conservative	Andrea Leadsom	Conservative	Seat held
South Ribble	Conservative	Katherine Fletcher	Conservative	Incumbent, Seema Kennedy, did not stand
South Shields	Labour	Emma Lewell-Buck	Labour	Seat held
South Staffordshire	Conservative	Gavin Williamson	Conservative	Seat held
South Suffolk	Conservative	James Cartlidge	Conservative	Seat held
South Swindon	Conservative	Robert Buckland	Conservative	Seat held
South Thanet	Conservative	Craig Mackinlay	Conservative	Seat held
South West Bedfordshire	Conservative	Andrew Selous	Conservative	Seat held
South West Devon	Conservative	Gary Streeter	Conservative	Seat held
South West Hertfordshire	Independent	Gagan Mohindra	Conservative	Defeated incumbent, David Gauke
South West Norfolk	Conservative	Liz Truss	Conservative	Seat held
South West Surrey	Conservative	Jeremy Hunt	Conservative	Seat held
South West Wiltshire	Conservative	Andrew Murrison	Conservative	Seat held
Southampton Itchen	Conservative	Royston Smith	Conservative	Seat held
Southampton Test	Labour	Alan Whitehead	Labour	Seat held
Southend West	Conservative	David Amess	Conservative	Seat held
Southport	Conservative	Damien Moore	Conservative	Seat held
Spelthorne	Conservative	Kwasi Kwarteng	Conservative	Seat held
St Albans	Conservative	Daisy Cooper	Liberal Democrats	Defeated incumbent, Anne Main
St Austell and Newquay	Conservative	Steve Double	Conservative	Seat held
St Helens North	Labour	Conor McGinn	Labour	Seat held
St Helens South and Whiston	Labour	Marie Rimmer	Labour	Seat held
St Ives	Conservative	Derek Thomas	Conservative	Seat held
Stafford	Conservative	Theo Clarke	Conservative	Incumbent, Jeremy Lefroy, did not stand
Staffordshire Moorlands	Conservative	Karen Bradley	Conservative	Seat held
Stalybridge and Hyde	Labour Co-operative	Jonathan Reynolds	Labour Co-operative	Seat held
Stevenage	Conservative	Stephen McPartland	Conservative	Seat held
Stirling	Conservative	Alyn Smith	Scottish National	Defeated incumbent, Stephen Kerr
Stockport	Change UK	Navendu Mishra	Labour	Incumbent, Ann Coffey, did not stand
Stockton North	Labour	Alex Cunningham	Labour	Seat held
Stockton South	Labour	Matt Vickers	Conservative	Defeated incumbent, Paul Williams
Stoke-on-Trent Central	Labour Co-operative	Jo Gideon	Conservative	Defeated incumbent, Gareth Snell
Stoke-on-Trent North	Labour	Jonathan Gullis	Conservative	Defeated incumbent, Ruth Smeeth
Stoke-on-Trent South	Conservative	Jack Brereton	Conservative	Seat held
Stone	Conservative	Bill Cash	Conservative	Seat held
Stourbridge	Conservative	Suzanne Webb	Conservative	Incumbent, Margot James, did not stand
Strangford	DUP	Jim Shannon	DUP	Seat held
Stratford-on-Avon	Conservative	Nadhim Zahawi	Conservative	Seat held
Streatham	Liberal Democrats	Bell Ribeiro-Addy	Labour	Incumbent, Chuka Umunna, did not stand
Stretford and Urmston	Labour	Kate Green	Labour	Seat held
Stroud	Labour Co-operative	Siobhan Baillie	Conservative	Defeated incumbent, David Drew
Suffolk Coastal	Conservative	Therese Coffey	Conservative	Seat held
Sunderland Central	Labour	Julie Elliott	Labour	Seat held
Surrey Heath	Conservative	Michael Gove	Conservative	Seat held
Sutton and Cheam	Conservative	Paul Scully	Conservative	Seat held
Sutton Coldfield	Conservative	Andrew Mitchell	Conservative	Seat held
Swansea East	Labour	Carolyn Harris	Labour	Seat held
Swansea West	Labour Co-operative	Geraint Davies	Labour Co-operative	Seat held
Tamworth	Conservative	Chris Pincher	Conservative	Seat held
Tatton	Conservative	Esther McVey	Conservative	Seat held
Taunton Deane	Conservative	Rebecca Pow	Conservative	Seat held
Telford	Conservative	Lucy Allan	Conservative	Seat held
Tewkesbury	Conservative	Laurence Robertson	Conservative	Seat held
The Cotswolds	Conservative	Geoffrey Clifton-Brown	Conservative	Seat held
The Wrekin	Conservative	Mark Pritchard	Conservative	Seat held
Thirsk and Malton	Conservative	Kevin Hollinrake	Conservative	Seat held
Thornbury and Yate	Conservative	Luke Hall	Conservative	Seat held
Thurrock	Conservative	Jackie Doyle-Price	Conservative	Seat held
Tiverton and Honiton	Conservative	Neil Parish	Conservative	Seat held
Tonbridge and Malling	Conservative	Thomas Tugendhat	Conservative	Seat held
Tooting	Labour	Rosena Allin-Khan	Labour	Seat held
Torbay	Conservative	Kevin Foster	Conservative	Seat held
Torfaen	Labour	Nick Thomas-Symonds	Labour	Seat held
Torridge and West Devon	Conservative	Geoffrey Cox	Conservative	Seat held
Totnes	Liberal Democrats	Anthony Mangnall	Conservative	Defeated incumbent, Sarah Wollaston
Tottenham	Labour	David Lammy	Labour	Seat held
Truro and Falmouth	Conservative	Cherilyn Mackrory	Conservative	Incumbent, Sarah Newton, did not stand
Tunbridge Wells	Conservative	Greg Clark	Conservative	Seat held
Twickenham	Liberal Democrats	Munira Wilson	Liberal Democrats	Incumbent, Vince Cable, did not stand
Tynemouth	Labour	Alan Campbell	Labour	Seat held
Upper Bann	DUP	Carla Lockhart	DUP	Incumbent, David Simpson, did not stand
Uxbridge and South Ruislip	Conservative	Boris Johnson	Conservative	Seat held
Vale of Clwyd	Labour	James Davies	Conservative	Defeated incumbent, Chris Ruane
Vale of Glamorgan	Conservative	Alun Cairns	Conservative	Seat held
Vauxhall	Labour	Florence Eshalomi	Labour Co-operative	Incumbent, Kate Hoey, did not stand
Wakefield	Labour	Imran Ahmad Khan	Conservative	Defeated incumbent, Mary Creagh
Wallasey	Labour	Angela Eagle	Labour	Seat held
Walsall North	Conservative	Eddie Hughes	Conservative	Seat held
Walsall South	Labour	Valerie Vaz	Labour	Seat held
Walthamstow	Labour Co-operative	Stella Creasy	Labour Co-operative	Seat held
Wansbeck	Labour	Ian Lavery	Labour	Seat held
Wantage	Conservative	David Johnston	Conservative	Incumbent, Ed Vaizey, did not stand
Warley	Labour	John Spellar	Labour	Seat held
Warrington North	Labour	Charlotte Nichols	Labour	Incumbent, Helen Jones, did not stand
Warrington South	Labour	Andy Carter	Conservative	Defeated incumbent, Faisal Rashid
Warwick and Leamington	Labour	Matt Western	Labour	Seat held
Washington and Sunderland West	Labour	Sharon Hodgson	Labour	Seat held
Watford	Conservative	Dean Russell	Conservative	Incumbent, Richard Harrington, did not stand
Waveney	Conservative	Peter Aldous	Conservative	Seat held
Wealden	Conservative	Nus Ghani	Conservative	Seat held
Weaver Vale	Labour	Mike Amesbury	Labour	Seat held
Wellingborough	Conservative	Peter Bone	Conservative	Seat held
Wells	Conservative	James Heappey	Conservative	Seat held
Welwyn Hatfield	Conservative	Grant Shapps	Conservative	Seat held
Wentworth and Dearne	Labour	John Healey	Labour	Seat held
West Aberdeenshire and Kincardine	Conservative	Andrew Bowie	Conservative	Seat held
West Bromwich East	Labour	Nicola Richards	Conservative	Incumbent, Tom Watson, did not stand
West Bromwich West	Labour Co-operative	Shaun Bailey	Conservative	Incumbent, Adrian Bailey, did not stand
West Dorset	Independent	Chris Loder	Conservative	Incumbent, Oliver Letwin, did not stand
West Dunbartonshire	Scottish National	Martin Docherty-Hughes	Scottish National	Seat held
West Ham	Labour	Lyn Brown	Labour	Seat held
West Lancashire	Labour	Rosie Cooper	Labour	Seat held
West Suffolk	Conservative	Matt Hancock	Conservative	Seat held
West Tyrone	Sinn Féin	Órfhlaith Begley	Sinn Féin	Seat held
West Worcestershire	Conservative	Harriett Baldwin	Conservative	Seat held
Westminster North	Labour	Karen Buck	Labour	Seat held
Westmorland and Lonsdale	Liberal Democrats	Tim Farron	Liberal Democrats	Seat held
Weston-Super-Mare	Conservative	John Penrose	Conservative	Seat held
Wigan	Labour	Lisa Nandy	Labour	Seat held
Wimbledon	Conservative	Stephen Hammond	Conservative	Seat held
Winchester	Conservative	Steve Brine	Conservative	Seat held
Windsor	Conservative	Adam Afriyie	Conservative	Seat held
Wirral South	Labour	Alison McGovern	Labour	Seat held
Wirral West	Labour	Margaret Greenwood	Labour	Seat held
Witham	Conservative	Priti Patel	Conservative	Seat held
Witney	Conservative	Robert Courts	Conservative	Seat held
Woking	Conservative	Jonathan Lord	Conservative	Seat held
Wokingham	Conservative	John Redwood	Conservative	Seat held
Wolverhampton North East	Labour	Jane Stevenson	Conservative	Defeated incumbent, Emma Reynolds
Wolverhampton South East	Labour	Pat McFadden	Labour	Seat held
Wolverhampton South West	Labour	Stuart Anderson	Conservative	Defeated incumbent, Eleanor Smith
Worcester	Conservative	Robin Walker	Conservative	Seat held
Workington	Labour	Mark Jenkinson	Conservative	Defeated incumbent, Sue Hayman
Worsley and Eccles South	Labour	Barbara Keeley	Labour	Seat held
Worthing West	Conservative	Peter Bottomley	Conservative	Seat held
Wrexham	Labour	Sarah Atherton	Conservative	Incumbent, Ian Lucas, did not stand
Wycombe	Conservative	Steven Baker	Conservative	Seat held
Wyre and Preston North	Conservative	Ben Wallace	Conservative	Seat held
Wyre Forest	Conservative	Mark Garnier	Conservative	Seat held
Wythenshawe and Sale East	Labour	Mike Kane	Labour	Seat held
Yeovil	Conservative	Marcus Fysh	Conservative	Seat held
Ynys Môn	Labour	Virginia Crosbie	Conservative	Incumbent, Albert Owen, did not stand
York Central	Labour Co-operative	Rachael Maskell	Labour Co-operative	Seat held
York Outer	Conservative	Julian Sturdy	Conservative	Seat held

== By-elections ==
Constituency	Date	Incumbent	Party	Winner	Party	Cause
Hartlepool	6 May 2021	Mike Hill	Labour	Jill Mortimer	Conservative	Resignation following allegations of sexual harassment and victimisation
Airdrie and Shotts	13 May 2021	Neil Gray	SNP	Anum Qaisar	SNP	Resignation to contest the seat of Airdrie and Shotts in the Scottish Parliament
Chesham and Amersham	17 June 2021	Cheryl Gillan	Conservative	Sarah Green	Liberal Democrats	Death of incumbent
Batley and Spen	1 July 2021	Tracy Brabin	Labour Co-op	Kim Leadbeater	Labour	Election of incumbent as Mayor of West Yorkshire
Old Bexley and Sidcup	2 December 2021	James Brokenshire	Conservative	Louie French	Conservative	Death of incumbent
North Shropshire	16 December 2021	Owen Paterson	Conservative	Helen Morgan	Liberal Democrats	Resignation following publication of Standards Committee Report regarding paid advocacy.
Southend West	3 February 2022	David Amess	Conservative	Anna Firth	Conservative (Note: As a mark of respect for the murdered MP. Labour, Lib Dem, Green and Reform UK did not field a candidate to contest the by-election.)	Murder of incumbent
Birmingham Erdington	3 March 2022	Jack Dromey	Labour	Paulette Hamilton	Labour	Death of incumbent
Wakefield	23 June 2022	Imran Ahmad Khan	Conservative (Note: Elected as Conservative, sitting as an independent MP at the time of their resignation.)	Simon Lightwood	Labour Co-op	Resignation following conviction of sexual assault of a 15-year-old boy
Tiverton and Honiton	23 June 2022	Neil Parish	Conservative	Richard Foord	Liberal Democrats	Resignation following accusations of watching pornography in the House of Commons
City of Chester	1 December 2022	Chris Matheson	Labour	Samantha Dixon	Labour	Resignation following allegations of sexual misconduct.
Stretford and Urmston	15 December 2022	Kate Green	Labour	Andrew Western	Labour	Resignation to take up the post of Deputy Mayor of Greater Manchester for Policing, succeeding Beverley Hughes.
West Lancashire	9 February 2023	Rosie Cooper	Labour	Ashley Dalton	Labour	Resignation to take up post of chair of the Mersey Care NHS Foundation Trust.
Uxbridge and South Ruislip	20 July 2023	Boris Johnson	Conservative	Steve Tuckwell	Conservative	Resigned between receiving a copy of the Standards Committee report in to Partygate and the report's publication and debate in parliament.
Selby and Ainsty	20 July 2023	Nigel Adams	Conservative	Keir Mather	Labour	Resignation
Somerton and Frome	20 July 2023	David Warburton	Conservative	Sarah Dyke	Liberal Democrats	Resigned claiming unfair treatment by the Parliamentary Commissioner for Standards over sexual harassment claims.
Rutherglen and Hamilton West	5 October 2023	Margaret Ferrier	SNP (Note: Elected as SNP, sitting as an independent MP at the time of her removal.)	Michael Shanks	Labour	Removed as MP via recall petition following suspension from the House of Commons.
Mid Bedfordshire	19 October 2023	Nadine Dorries	Conservative	Alistair Strathern	Labour	Resignation
Tamworth	19 October 2023	Chris Pincher	Conservative	Sarah Edwards	Labour	Resignation following recommendation of suspension by the Committee on Standards due to allegations of sexual misconduct.
Wellingborough	15 February 2024	Peter Bone	Conservative	Gen Kitchen	Labour	Removed as MP via recall petition following suspension from the House of Commons due to allegations of bullying and sexual misconduct.
Kingswood	15 February 2024	Chris Skidmore	Conservative	Damien Egan	Labour	Resigned in protest over the government issuing new oil and gas licenses.
Rochdale	29 February 2024	Tony Lloyd	Labour	George Galloway	Workers Party	Death of incumbent
Blackpool South	2 May 2024	Scott Benton	Conservative	Chris Webb	Labour	Resignation following suspension by the Committee on Standards due to lobbying-related corruption.

== Defections, suspensions, and resignations ==
The label under which MPs sit in the House of Commons can change if they leave or are suspended from or expelled by their party. When suspended, they effectively become independents.

Name	Date	Before	After	Constituency	Reason
Neale Hanvey	13 December 2019	SNP	Independent	Kirkcaldy and Cowdenbeath	Suspended as a candidate on 28 November 2019 due to insensitive social media posts. Remained as SNP candidate on ballot, elected as independent. Reinstated after an investigation.
Neale Hanvey	29 May 2020	Independent	SNP	Kirkcaldy and Cowdenbeath	Suspended as a candidate on 28 November 2019 due to insensitive social media posts. Remained as SNP candidate on ballot, elected as independent. Reinstated after an investigation.
Neale Hanvey	28 March 2021	SNP	Alba	Kirkcaldy and Cowdenbeath	Defected to new pro-independence party in March 2021.
Jonathan Edwards	23 May 2020	Plaid Cymru	Independent	Carmarthen East and Dinefwr	Arrested on suspicion of assault. Whip restored in August 2022, but did not rejoin Plaid's Westminster group.
Julian Lewis	15 July 2020	Conservative	Independent	New Forest East	Elected chair of the Intelligence and Security Committee against the Government's candidate. Whip restored in December 2020.
Julian Lewis	30 December 2020	Independent	Conservative	New Forest East	Elected chair of the Intelligence and Security Committee against the Government's candidate. Whip restored in December 2020.
Claudia Webbe	28 September 2020	Labour	Independent	Leicester East	Charged with harassing a woman. Expelled from party upon conviction in November 2021. Avoided recall petition as her sentence was reduced on appeal to non-custodial community service order.
Margaret Ferrier	1 October 2020	SNP	Independent	Rutherglen and Hamilton West	Breaching COVID-19 rules. Removed by recall petition following suspension from Parliament.
Margaret Ferrier	1 August 2023	—N/a	Recalled	Rutherglen and Hamilton West	Breaching COVID-19 rules. Removed by recall petition following suspension from Parliament.
Jeremy Corbyn	29 October 2020	Labour	Independent	Islington North	Statements regarding the report by the Equality and Human Rights Commission into antisemitism. Readmitted to the party on 17 November 2020 but parliamentary whip was not restored.
Mike Hill	16 March 2021	—N/a	Resigned	Hartlepool	§ by-elections
Neil Gray	24 March 2021	—N/a	Resigned	Airdrie and Shotts	§ by-elections
Kenny MacAskill	27 March 2021	SNP	Alba	East Lothian	Defected to new pro-Scottish independence party.
Tracy Brabin	10 May 2021	—N/a	Resigned	Batley and Spen	§ by-elections
Rob Roberts	25 May 2021	Conservative	Independent	Delyn	Suspended from Parliament for six weeks after an independent panel found he sexually harassed a member of staff.
Imran Ahmad Khan	18 June 2021	Conservative	Independent	Wakefield	Charged with sexual assault on a 15-year-old boy. Resigned after being convicted.
Imran Ahmad Khan	3 May 2022	—N/a	Resigned	Wakefield	Charged with sexual assault on a 15-year-old boy. Resigned after being convicted.
Owen Paterson	5 November 2021	—N/a	Resigned	North Shropshire	§ by-elections
Anne Marie Morris	12 January 2022	Conservative	Independent	Newton Abbot	Rebelling against the government on an opposition day motion to cut VAT on energy bills. Whip restored in May 2022.
Anne Marie Morris	12 May 2022	Independent	Conservative	Newton Abbot	Rebelling against the government on an opposition day motion to cut VAT on energy bills. Whip restored in May 2022.
Christian Wakeford	19 January 2022	Conservative	Labour	Bury South	Defected to Labour following the Partygate scandal.
Neil Coyle	11 February 2022	Labour	Independent	Bermondsey and Old Southwark	Accused of Sinophobia on the parliamentary estate. Whip restored in May 2023.
Neil Coyle	24 May 2023	Independent	Labour	Bermondsey and Old Southwark	Accused of Sinophobia on the parliamentary estate. Whip restored in May 2023.
David Warburton	2 April 2022	Conservative	Independent	Somerton and Frome	Alleged sexual harassment of three women. Resigned after admitting taking drugs.
David Warburton	19 June 2023	—N/a	Resigned	Somerton and Frome	Alleged sexual harassment of three women. Resigned after admitting taking drugs.
Neil Parish	29 April 2022	Conservative	Independent	Tiverton and Honiton	Admitted viewing pornography in the House of Commons.
Neil Parish	4 May 2022	—N/a	Resigned	Tiverton and Honiton	Admitted viewing pornography in the House of Commons.
Patrick Grady	26 June 2022	SNP	Independent	Glasgow North	Police investigation into sexual harassment allegations from October 2016. Suspended from Parliament for two days. Whip restored in December 2022.
Patrick Grady	29 December 2022	Independent	SNP	Glasgow North	Police investigation into sexual harassment allegations from October 2016. Suspended from Parliament for two days. Whip restored in December 2022.
Chris Pincher	1 July 2022	Conservative	Independent	Tamworth	Allegations of drunkenly groping two men. Resigned after losing appeal against Commons suspension.
Chris Pincher	7 September 2023	—N/a	Resigned	Tamworth	Allegations of drunkenly groping two men. Resigned after losing appeal against Commons suspension.
Tobias Ellwood	19 July 2022	Conservative	Independent	Bournemouth East	Failing to support government in confidence vote; temporarily restored the next day to allow voting in leadership election. Whip restored in October 2022.
Tobias Ellwood	15 October 2022	Independent	Conservative	Bournemouth East	Failing to support government in confidence vote; temporarily restored the next day to allow voting in leadership election. Whip restored in October 2022.
Nick Brown	7 September 2022	Labour	Independent	Newcastle upon Tyne East	Suspended pending an investigation into a complaint. Resigned from party in December 2023 and announced that he would not contest the next election.
Rupa Huq	27 September 2022	Labour	Independent	Ealing Central and Acton	Comments about Chancellor of the Exchequer Kwasi Kwarteng. Whip restored in March 2023.
Rupa Huq	3 March 2023	Independent	Labour	Ealing Central and Acton	Comments about Chancellor of the Exchequer Kwasi Kwarteng. Whip restored in March 2023.
Conor Burns	7 October 2022	Conservative	Independent	Bournemouth West	Allegations of misconduct at Conservative Party Conference. Whip restored in December 2022.
Conor Burns	3 December 2022	Independent	Conservative	Bournemouth West	Allegations of misconduct at Conservative Party Conference. Whip restored in December 2022.
Christina Rees	13 October 2022	Labour Co-op	Independent	Neath	Suspended pending an investigation into a complaint concerned with alleged bullying. Whip restored in February 2024.
Christina Rees	1 February 2024	Independent	Labour Co-op	Neath	Suspended pending an investigation into a complaint concerned with alleged bullying. Whip restored in February 2024.
Chris Matheson	21 October 2022	—N/a	Resigned	City of Chester	§ by-elections
Matt Hancock	1 November 2022	Conservative	Independent	West Suffolk	Unauthorised appearance on a reality TV programme. Whip restored in May 2024.
Matt Hancock	23 May 2024	Independent	Conservative	West Suffolk	Unauthorised appearance on a reality TV programme. Whip restored in May 2024.
Kate Green	10 November 2022	—N/a	Resigned	Stretford and Urmston	§ by-elections
Rosie Cooper	30 November 2022	—N/a	Resigned	West Lancashire	§ by-elections
Conor McGinn	7 December 2022	Labour	Independent	St Helens North	Suspended pending investigation of a complaint.
Julian Knight	7 December 2022	Conservative	Independent	Solihull	Suspended following a complaint made to the Metropolitan Police.
Andrew Bridgen	11 January 2023	Conservative	Independent	North West Leicestershire	Tweets comparing COVID-19 vaccines to the Holocaust. Expelled from party in April 2023. Joined Reclaim Party on 10 May 2023.
Andrew Bridgen	10 May 2023	Independent	Reclaim	North West Leicestershire	Tweets comparing COVID-19 vaccines to the Holocaust. Expelled from party in April 2023. Joined Reclaim Party on 10 May 2023.
Andrew Bridgen	20 December 2023	Reclaim	Independent	North West Leicestershire	Left Reclaim on 20 December 2023 due to policy differences.
Scott Benton	5 April 2023	Conservative	Independent	Blackpool South	Suspended pending investigation into paid lobbying. Resigned whilst a recall petition was underway.
Scott Benton	25 March 2024	—N/a	Resigned	Blackpool South	Suspended pending investigation into paid lobbying. Resigned whilst a recall petition was underway.
Diane Abbott	23 April 2023	Labour	Independent	Hackney North and Stoke Newington	Suspended pending an investigation into a letter she wrote about racism for The Observer. Whip restored in May 2024.
Diane Abbott	28 May 2024	Independent	Labour	Hackney North and Stoke Newington	Suspended pending an investigation into a letter she wrote about racism for The Observer. Whip restored in May 2024.
Geraint Davies	1 June 2023	Labour Co-op	Independent	Swansea West	Suspended following allegations of sexual harassment.
Bambos Charalambous	9 June 2023	Labour	Independent	Enfield Southgate	Suspended after complaint about conduct. Whip restored in April 2024.
Bambos Charalambous	12 April 2024	Independent	Labour	Enfield Southgate	Suspended after complaint about conduct. Whip restored in April 2024.
Nigel Adams	12 June 2023	—N/a	Resigned	Selby & Ainsty	§ by-elections
Boris Johnson	12 June 2023	—N/a	Resigned	Uxbridge and South Ruislip	§ by-elections
Angus MacNeil	5 July 2023	SNP	Independent	Na h-Eileanan an Iar	Clash with SNP chief whip Brendan O'Hara. Subsequently expelled from the SNP.
Nadine Dorries	29 August 2023	—N/a	Resigned	Mid-Bedfordshire	§ by-elections
Lisa Cameron	12 October 2023	SNP	Conservative	East Kilbride, Strathaven and Lesmahagow	Defected to Conservatives due to "toxic and bullying" culture in the SNP.
Peter Bone	17 October 2023	Conservative	Independent	Wellingborough	Accusations of bullying and sexual misconduct. Removed by recall petition.
Peter Bone	19 December 2023	—N/a	Recalled	Wellingborough	Accusations of bullying and sexual misconduct. Removed by recall petition.
Crispin Blunt	26 October 2023	Conservative	Independent	Reigate	Arrest on suspicion of rape and possession of drugs.
Andy McDonald	30 October 2023	Labour	Independent	Middlesbrough	Comments at a pro-Palestinian rally. Whip restored in March 2024.
Andy McDonald	13 March 2024	Independent	Labour	Middlesbrough	Comments at a pro-Palestinian rally. Whip restored in March 2024.
Bob Stewart	4 November 2023	Conservative	Independent	Beckenham	Conviction for a racially aggravated public order offence that has been quashed on appeal. Whip restored in May 2024.
Bob Stewart	23 May 2024	Independent	Conservative	Beckenham	Conviction for a racially aggravated public order offence that has been quashed on appeal. Whip restored in May 2024.
Chris Skidmore	8 January 2024	—N/a	Resigned	Kingswood	§ by-elections
Kate Osamor	29 January 2024	Labour Co-op	Independent	Edmonton	Referencing Gaza war in a post commemorating Holocaust Memorial Day. Whip restored in May 2024.
Kate Osamor	8 May 2024	Independent	Labour Co-op	Edmonton	Referencing Gaza war in a post commemorating Holocaust Memorial Day. Whip restored in May 2024.
Lee Anderson	24 February 2024	Conservative	Independent	Ashfield	Allegedly Islamophobic comments in an interview about Sadiq Khan. Later joined Reform UK.
Lee Anderson	11 March 2024	Independent	Reform	Ashfield	Allegedly Islamophobic comments in an interview about Sadiq Khan. Later joined Reform UK.
Jeffrey Donaldson	29 March 2024	DUP	Independent	Lagan Valley	Party membership suspended following charges of historic sex offences.
William Wragg	9 April 2024	Conservative	Independent	Hazel Grove	Voluntarily surrendered whip after providing contact details of other MPs in a honeypot.
Mark Menzies	17 April 2024	Conservative	Independent	Fylde	Resigned the whip pending investigation into alleged misuse of campaign funds. Subsequently leaves the party on 21 April 2024 and announces that he would not contest the next election.
Dan Poulter	27 April 2024	Conservative	Labour	Central Suffolk and North Ipswich	Defected to Labour, describing the Conservatives as "a nationalist party of the right" which "no longer prioritises the NHS".
Natalie Elphicke	8 May 2024	Conservative	Labour	Dover	Defected to Labour, describing Sunak's government as "a byword for incompetence and division."
Lucy Allan	27 May 2024	Conservative	Independent	Telford	Suspended after backing the Reform UK candidate to succeed her in the 2024 election.
Lloyd Russell-Moyle	29 May 2024	Labour Co-op	Independent	Brighton Kemptown	Suspended by the Labour Party over a complaint about his behaviour.
Mark Logan	30 May 2024	Conservative	Labour	Bolton North East	Defected to Labour, saying the party could "bring back optimism into British life".

== Progression of government majority and party totals ==
The majority is calculated as above.

Date	Event	Working majority	Con.	Lab.	SNP	LD	DUP	PC	SDLP	Grn	APNI	Alba	Rec.	WPB	Ref.	Ind.	SF	Spkr	Vacant
13 December 2019	Elected at general election	87	365	202	48	11	8	4	2	1	1	0	0	0	0	0	7*	1**	0
13 December 2019	Hanvey suspended from SNP	87	365	202	47	11	8	4	2	1	1	0	0	0	0	1	7*	1**	0
23 May 2020	Edwards (Plaid) loses whip	87	365	202	47	11	8	3	2	1	1	0	0	0	0	2	7*	1**	0
29 May 2020	Hanvey has SNP whip reinstated	87	365	202	48	11	8	3	2	1	1	0	0	0	0	1	7*	1**	0
15 July 2020	J Lewis (Con) loses whip	85	364	202	48	11	8	3	2	1	1	0	0	0	0	2	7*	1**	0
28 September 2020	Webbe (Lab) loses whip	85	364	201	48	11	8	3	2	1	1	0	0	0	0	3	7*	1**	0
1 October 2020	Ferrier (SNP) loses whip	85	364	201	47	11	8	3	2	1	1	0	0	0	0	4	7*	1**	0
29 October 2020	Corbyn (Lab) loses whip (Note: Corbyn was also suspended from Labour on this date, but reinstated to the party without PLP whip on 17 November 2020.)	85	364	200	47	11	8	3	2	1	1	0	0	0	0	5	7*	1**	0
30 December 2020	J Lewis has Con whip reinstated	87	365	200	47	11	8	3	2	1	1	0	0	0	0	4	7*	1**	0
16 March 2021	Hill (Lab) resigns	88	365	199	47	11	8	3	2	1	1	0	0	0	0	4	7*	1**	1
24 March 2021	Gray (SNP) resigns	89	365	199	46	11	8	3	2	1	1	0	0	0	0	4	7*	1**	2
27 March 2021	MacAskill (SNP) defects to Alba	89	365	199	45	11	8	3	2	1	1	1	0	0	0	4	7*	1**	2
28 March 2021	Hanvey (SNP) defects to Alba	89	365	199	44	11	8	3	2	1	1	2	0	0	0	4	7*	1**	2
4 April 2021	Gillan (Con) dies	88	364	199	44	11	8	3	2	1	1	2	0	0	0	4	7*	1**	3
6 May 2021	Mortimer (Con) elected in Hartlepool	89	365	199	44	11	8	3	2	1	1	2	0	0	0	4	7*	1**	2
10 May 2021	Brabin (Lab) resigns	90	365	198	44	11	8	3	2	1	1	2	0	0	0	4	7*	1**	3
13 May 2021	Qaisar-Javed (SNP) elected in Airdrie and Shotts	89	365	198	45	11	8	3	2	1	1	2	0	0	0	4	7*	1**	2
25 May 2021	Roberts (Con) loses whip	87	364	198	45	11	8	3	2	1	1	2	0	0	0	5	7*	1**	2
17 June 2021	Green (LibDem) elected in Chesham and Amersham	86	364	198	45	12	8	3	2	1	1	2	0	0	0	5	7*	1**	1
18 June 2021	Ahmad Khan (Con) loses whip	84	363	198	45	12	8	3	2	1	1	2	0	0	0	6	7*	1**	1
1 July 2021	Leadbeater (Lab) elected in Batley and Spen	83	363	199	45	12	8	3	2	1	1	2	0	0	0	6	7*	1**	0
7 October 2021	Brokenshire (Con) dies	82	362	199	45	12	8	3	2	1	1	2	0	0	0	6	7*	1**	1
15 October 2021	Amess (Con) killed	81	361	199	45	12	8	3	2	1	1	2	0	0	0	6	7*	1**	2
5 November 2021	Paterson (Con) resigns	80	360	199	45	12	8	3	2	1	1	2	0	0	0	6	7*	1**	3
2 December 2021	French (Con) elected in Old Bexley and Sidcup	81	361	199	45	12	8	3	2	1	1	2	0	0	0	6	7*	1**	2
17 December 2021	Morgan (LibDem) elected in North Shropshire	80	361	199	45	13	8	3	2	1	1	2	0	0	0	6	7*	1**	1
7 January 2022	Dromey (Lab) dies	81	361	198	45	13	8	3	2	1	1	2	0	0	0	6	7*	1**	2
11 January 2022	A M Morris (Con) loses whip	79	360	198	45	13	8	3	2	1	1	2	0	0	0	7	7*	1**	2
19 January 2022	Wakeford (Con) defects to Labour	77	359	199	45	13	8	3	2	1	1	2	0	0	0	7	7*	1**	2
3 February 2022	Firth (Con) elected in Southend West	78	360	199	45	13	8	3	2	1	1	2	0	0	0	7	7*	1**	1
11 February 2022	Coyle (Lab) loses whip	78	360	198	45	13	8	3	2	1	1	2	0	0	0	8	7*	1**	1
3 March 2022	Hamilton (Lab) elected in Birmingham Erdington	77	360	199	45	13	8	3	2	1	1	2	0	0	0	8	7*	1**	0
2 April 2022	Warburton (Con) loses whip	75	359	199	45	13	8	3	2	1	1	2	0	0	0	9	7*	1**	0
29 April 2022	Parish (Con) loses whip	73	358	199	45	13	8	3	2	1	1	2	0	0	0	10	7*	1**	0
3 May 2022	Ahmad Khan (Ind) resigns	74	358	199	45	13	8	3	2	1	1	2	0	0	0	9	7*	1**	1
4 May 2022	Parish (Ind) resigns	75	358	199	45	13	8	3	2	1	1	2	0	0	0	8	7*	1**	2
12 May 2022	A M Morris has Con whip reinstated	77	359	199	45	13	8	3	2	1	1	2	0	0	0	7	7*	1**	2
24 June 2022	Lightwood (Lab) elected in Wakefield	76	359	200	45	13	8	3	2	1	1	2	0	0	0	7	7*	1**	1
24 June 2022	Foord (LibDem) elected in Tiverton and Honiton	75	359	200	45	14	8	3	2	1	1	2	0	0	0	7	7*	1**	0
26 June 2022	Grady (SNP) suspends his own whip	75	359	200	44	14	8	3	2	1	1	2	0	0	0	8	7*	1**	0
1 July 2022	Pincher (Con) loses whip	73	358	200	44	14	8	3	2	1	1	2	0	0	0	9	7*	1**	0
19 July 2022	Ellwood (Con) loses whip (Note: Temporarily restored on 20 July 2022 to allow voting in leadership election.)	71	357	200	44	14	8	3	2	1	1	2	0	0	0	10	7*	1**	0
7 September 2022	N Brown (Lab) loses whip	71	357	199	44	14	8	3	2	1	1	2	0	0	0	11	7*	1**	0
27 September 2022	Huq (Lab) loses whip	71	357	198	44	14	8	3	2	1	1	2	0	0	0	12	7*	1**	0
7 October 2022	Burns (Con) loses whip	69	356	198	44	14	8	3	2	1	1	2	0	0	0	13	7*	1**	0
13 October 2022	Rees (Lab) loses whip	69	356	197	44	14	8	3	2	1	1	2	0	0	0	14	7*	1**	0
15 October 2022	Ellwood has Con whip reinstated	71	357	197	44	14	8	3	2	1	1	2	0	0	0	13	7*	1**	0
21 October 2022	Matheson (Lab) resigns	72	357	196	44	14	8	3	2	1	1	2	0	0	0	13	7*	1**	1
1 November 2022	Hancock (Con) loses whip	70	356	196	44	14	8	3	2	1	1	2	0	0	0	14	7*	1**	1
10 November 2022	Green (Lab) resigns	71	356	195	44	14	8	3	2	1	1	2	0	0	0	14	7*	1**	2
30 November 2022	R Cooper (Lab) resigns	72	356	194	44	14	8	3	2	1	1	2	0	0	0	14	7*	1**	3
1 December 2022	Dixon (Lab) elected in City of Chester	71	356	195	44	14	8	3	2	1	1	2	0	0	0	14	7*	1**	2
3 December 2022	Burns has Con whip reinstated	73	357	195	44	14	8	3	2	1	1	2	0	0	0	13	7*	1**	2
7 December 2022	McGinn (Lab) loses whip	73	357	194	44	14	8	3	2	1	1	2	0	0	0	14	7*	1**	2
7 December 2022	J Knight (Con) loses whip	71	356	194	44	14	8	3	2	1	1	2	0	0	0	15	7*	1**	2
16 December 2022	Western (Lab) elected in Stretford and Urmston	70	356	195	44	14	8	3	2	1	1	2	0	0	0	15	7*	1**	1
19 December 2022	Gale (Con) appointed acting Chairman of Ways and Means	69	356	195	44	14	8	3	2	1	1	2	0	0	0	15	7*	1**	1
29 December 2022	Grady has SNP whip reinstated	69	356	195	45	14	8	3	2	1	1	2	0	0	0	14	7*	1**	1
11 January 2023	Bridgen (Con) loses whip	67	355	195	45	14	8	3	2	1	1	2	0	0	0	15	7*	1**	1
9 February 2023	Dalton (Lab) elected in West Lancashire	66	355	196	45	14	8	3	2	1	1	2	0	0	0	15	7*	1**	0
3 March 2023	Huq has Lab whip reinstated	66	355	197	45	14	8	3	2	1	1	2	0	0	0	14	7*	1**	0
5 April 2023	Benton (Con) loses whip	64	354	197	45	14	8	3	2	1	1	2	0	0	0	15	7*	1**	0
23 April 2023	Abbott (Lab) loses whip	64	354	196	45	14	8	3	2	1	1	2	0	0	0	16	7*	1**	0
10 May 2023	Bridgen (Ind) joins Reclaim	64	354	196	45	14	8	3	2	1	1	2	1	0	0	15	7*	1**	0
25 May 2023	Coyle has Lab whip reinstated	64	354	197	45	14	8	3	2	1	1	2	1	0	0	14	7*	1**	0
1 June 2023	G Davies (Lab) loses whip	64	354	196	45	14	8	3	2	1	1	2	1	0	0	15	7*	1**	0
9 June 2023	Charalambous (Lab) loses whip	64	354	195	45	14	8	3	2	1	1	2	1	0	0	16	7*	1**	0
12 June 2023	Adams (Con) resigns	63	353	195	45	14	8	3	2	1	1	2	1	0	0	16	7*	1**	1
12 June 2023	B Johnson (Con) resigns	62	352	195	45	14	8	3	2	1	1	2	1	0	0	16	7*	1**	2
19 June 2023	Warburton (Ind) resigns	63	352	195	45	14	8	3	2	1	1	2	1	0	0	15	7*	1**	3
5 July 2023	MacNeil (SNP) loses whip	63	352	195	44	14	8	3	2	1	1	2	1	0	0	16	7*	1**	3
20 July 2023	Tuckwell (Con) elected in Uxbridge and South Ruislip	64	353	195	44	14	8	3	2	1	1	2	1	0	0	16	7*	1**	2
20 July 2023	Mather (Lab) elected in Selby and Ainsty	63	353	196	44	14	8	3	2	1	1	2	1	0	0	16	7*	1**	1
20 July 2023	Dyke (LibDem) elected in Somerton and Frome	62	353	196	44	15	8	3	2	1	1	2	1	0	0	16	7*	1**	0
1 August 2023	Ferrier (Ind) recalled by petition	63	353	196	44	15	8	3	2	1	1	2	1	0	0	15	7*	1**	1
29 August 2023	Dorries (Con) resigns	62	352	196	44	15	8	3	2	1	1	2	1	0	0	15	7*	1**	2
7 September 2023	Pincher (Ind) resigns	63	352	196	44	15	8	3	2	1	1	2	1	0	0	14	7*	1**	3
5 October 2023	Shanks (Lab) elected in Rutherglen and Hamilton West	62	352	197	44	15	8	3	2	1	1	2	1	0	0	14	7*	1**	2
12 October 2023	Cameron (SNP) defects to Conservatives	64	353	197	43	15	8	3	2	1	1	2	1	0	0	14	7*	1**	2
17 October 2023	Bone (Con) loses whip	62	352	197	43	15	8	3	2	1	1	2	1	0	0	15	7*	1**	2
20 October 2023	Edwards (Lab) elected in Tamworth	61	352	198	43	15	8	3	2	1	1	2	1	0	0	15	7*	1**	1
20 October 2023	Strathern (Lab) elected in Mid Bedfordshire	60	352	199	43	15	8	3	2	1	1	2	1	0	0	15	7*	1**	0
26 October 2023	Blunt (Con) loses whip	58	351	199	43	15	8	3	2	1	1	2	1	0	0	16	7*	1**	0
30 October 2023	A McDonald (Lab) loses whip	58	351	198	43	15	8	3	2	1	1	2	1	0	0	17	7*	1**	0
4 November 2023	B Stewart (Con) loses whip	56	350	198	43	15	8	3	2	1	1	2	1	0	0	18	7*	1**	0
19 December 2023	Bone (Ind) recalled	57	350	198	43	15	8	3	2	1	1	2	1	0	0	17	7*	1**	1
20 December 2023	Bridgen leaves Reclaim	57	350	198	43	15	8	3	2	1	1	2	0	0	0	18	7*	1**	1
8 January 2024	Skidmore (Con) resigns	56	349	198	43	15	8	3	2	1	1	2	0	0	0	18	7*	1**	2
17 January 2024	Lloyd (Lab) dies	57	349	197	43	15	8	3	2	1	1	2	0	0	0	18	7*	1**	3
29 January 2024	Osamor (Lab) loses whip	57	349	196	43	15	8	3	2	1	1	2	0	0	0	19	7*	1**	3
1 February 2024	Rees has Lab whip reinstated	57	349	197	43	15	8	3	2	1	1	2	0	0	0	18	7*	1**	3
16 February 2024	Egan (Lab) elected in Kingswood	56	349	198	43	15	8	3	2	1	1	2	0	0	0	18	7*	1**	2
16 February 2024	Kitchen (Lab) elected in Wellingborough	55	349	199	43	15	8	3	2	1	1	2	0	0	0	18	7*	1**	1
24 February 2024	Anderson (Con) loses whip	53	348	199	43	15	8	3	2	1	1	2	0	0	0	19	7*	1**	1
29 February 2024	Galloway (WPB) elected in Rochdale	52	348	199	43	15	8	3	2	1	1	2	0	1	0	19	7*	1**	0
11 March 2024	Anderson joins Reform UK	52	348	199	43	15	8	3	2	1	1	2	0	1	1	18	7*	1**	0
13 March 2024	A McDonald (Lab) whip reinstated	52	348	200	43	15	8	3	2	1	1	2	0	1	1	17	7*	1**	0
25 March 2024	Benton resigns as MP	53	348	200	43	15	8	3	2	1	1	2	0	1	1	16	7*	1**	1
29 March 2024	Donaldson (DUP) loses whip	53	348	200	43	15	7	3	2	1	1	2	0	1	1	17	7*	1**	1
9 April 2024	Wragg (Con) resigns whip	51	347	200	43	15	7	3	2	1	1	2	0	1	1	18	7*	1**	1
12 April 2024	Charalambous (Lab) has whip reinstated	51	347	201	43	15	7	3	2	1	1	2	0	1	1	17	7*	1**	1
17 April 2024	Menzies (Con) resigns whip	49	346	201	43	15	7	3	2	1	1	2	0	1	1	18	7*	1**	1
27 April 2024	Poulter (Con) defects to Lab	47	345	202	43	15	7	3	2	1	1	2	0	1	1	18	7*	1**	1
3 May 2024	Webb (Lab) elected in Blackpool South	46	345	203	43	15	7	3	2	1	1	2	0	1	1	18	7*	1**	0
8 May 2024	Elphicke (Con) defects to Lab	44	344	205	43	15	7	3	2	1	1	2	0	1	1	18	7*	1**	0
8 May 2024	Osamor has Lab whip reinstated	44	344	205	43	15	7	3	2	1	1	2	0	1	1	17	7*	1**	0
23 May 2024	Hancock and B Stewart (Con) have whips reinstated	48	346	205	43	15	7	3	2	1	1	2	0	1	1	15	7*	1**	0
27 May 2024	Allan (Con) loses whip	46	345	205	43	15	7	3	2	1	1	2	0	1	1	16	7*	1**	0
28 May 2024	Abbott has Lab whip reinstated	46	345	206	43	15	7	3	2	1	1	2	0	1	1	15	7*	1**	0
29 May 2024	Russell-Moyle (Lab) loses whip	46	345	205	43	15	7	3	2	1	1	2	0	1	1	16	7*	1**	0
29 May 2024 (announced on 30 May 2024)	Logan (Con) leaves party	44	344	205	43	15	7	3	2	1	1	2	0	1	1	17	7*	1**	0
30 May 2024	Totals at dissolution of Parliament	44	344	205	43	15	7	3	2	1	1	2	0	1	1	17	7*	1**	0

* Sinn Féin MPs do not take up their seats in the House of Commons, therefore are unable to vote.
** The Speaker does not ordinarily vote, except for breaking ties.

== See also ==
- List of MPs for constituencies in London (2019–2024)
- List of United Kingdom MPs by seniority (2019–2024)
