= 2023 Somerton and Frome by-election =

UK parliamentary by-election, 20 July

- 20 July 2023

Somerton and Frome constituency
- Turnout: 44.2% (▼31.4 pp)
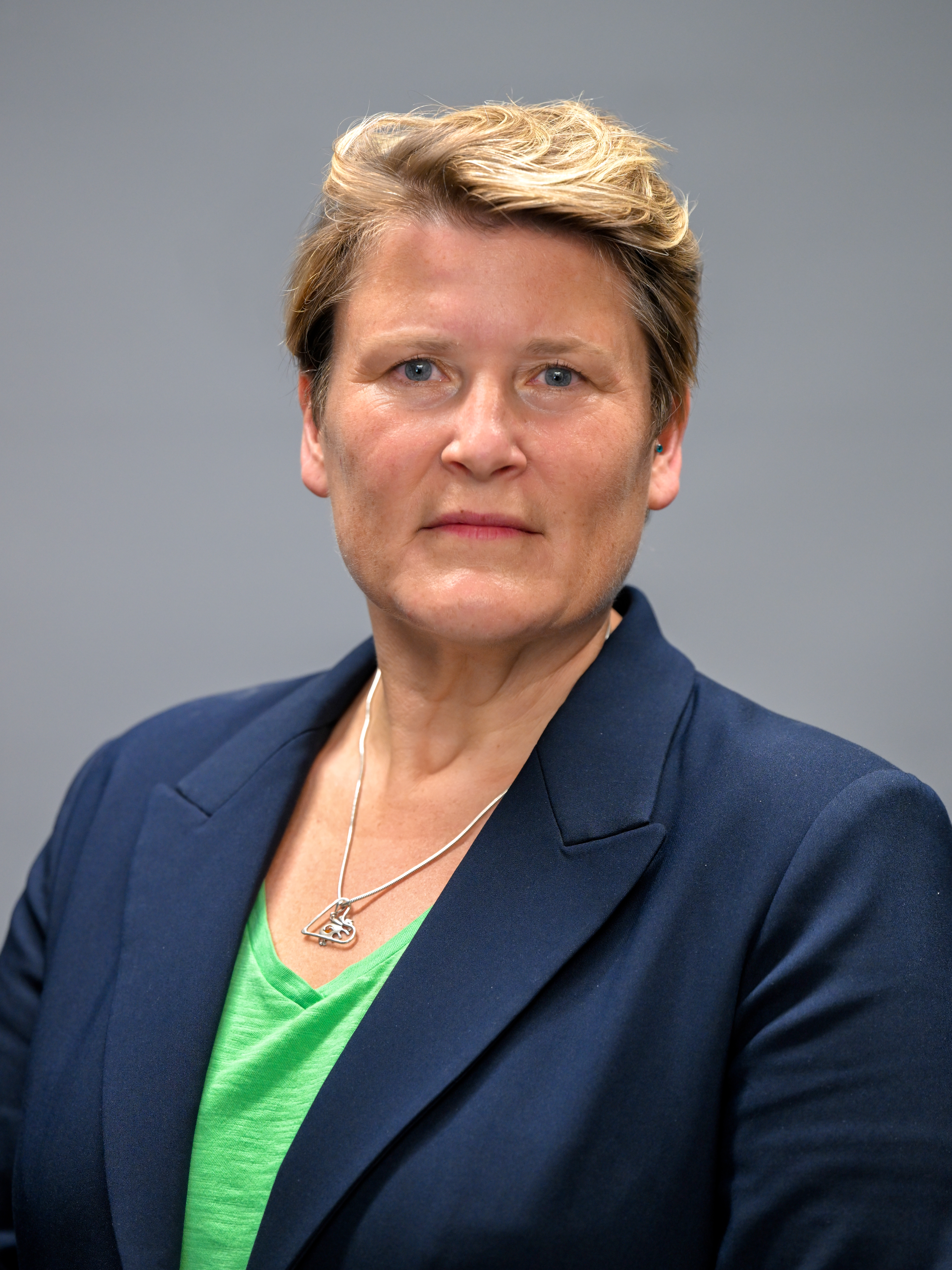
	First party	Second party	Third party
		Con	Grn
Candidate	Sarah Dyke	Faye Purbrick	Martin Dimery
Party	Liberal Democrats	Conservative	Green
Popular vote	21,187	10,739	3,944
Percentage	54.6%	26.2%	10.2%
Swing	▲28.4 pp	▼29.6 pp	▲5.1 pp
MP before election
David Warburton
Conservative
Elected MP
Sarah Dyke
Liberal Democrats

A by-election for the United Kingdom parliamentary constituency of Somerton and Frome was held on 20 July 2023, following the resignation of the incumbent Conservative Party MP David Warburton on 17 June. The seat was won by Sarah Dyke of the Liberal Democrats.

It was the first by-election in Somerset since the 1970 Bridgwater by-election, and was held on the same day as the 2023 Selby and Ainsty by-election and 2023 Uxbridge and South Ruislip by-election.

== Background ==
Somerton and Frome is a rural constituency in Somerset in the South West of England. The constituency includes the market towns of Somerton, Frome, Castle Cary, Langport, Wincanton, Templecombe, Bruton and Martock. Frome, the largest community in the seat, acts as a small commercial centre for the surrounding areas.

The constituency had been held by Liberal Democrat David Heath from 1997 to 2015, and was considered to be one of the party's traditional strongholds in the rural West Country. David Warburton was elected as the constituency's MP following the 2015 general election, securing the country's biggest swing to the Conservative Party amidst a nationwide collapse in the Liberal Democrat vote. He retained his seat with a majority of over 19,000 votes following the 2019 general election, though with a modest swing towards the Liberal Democrats.

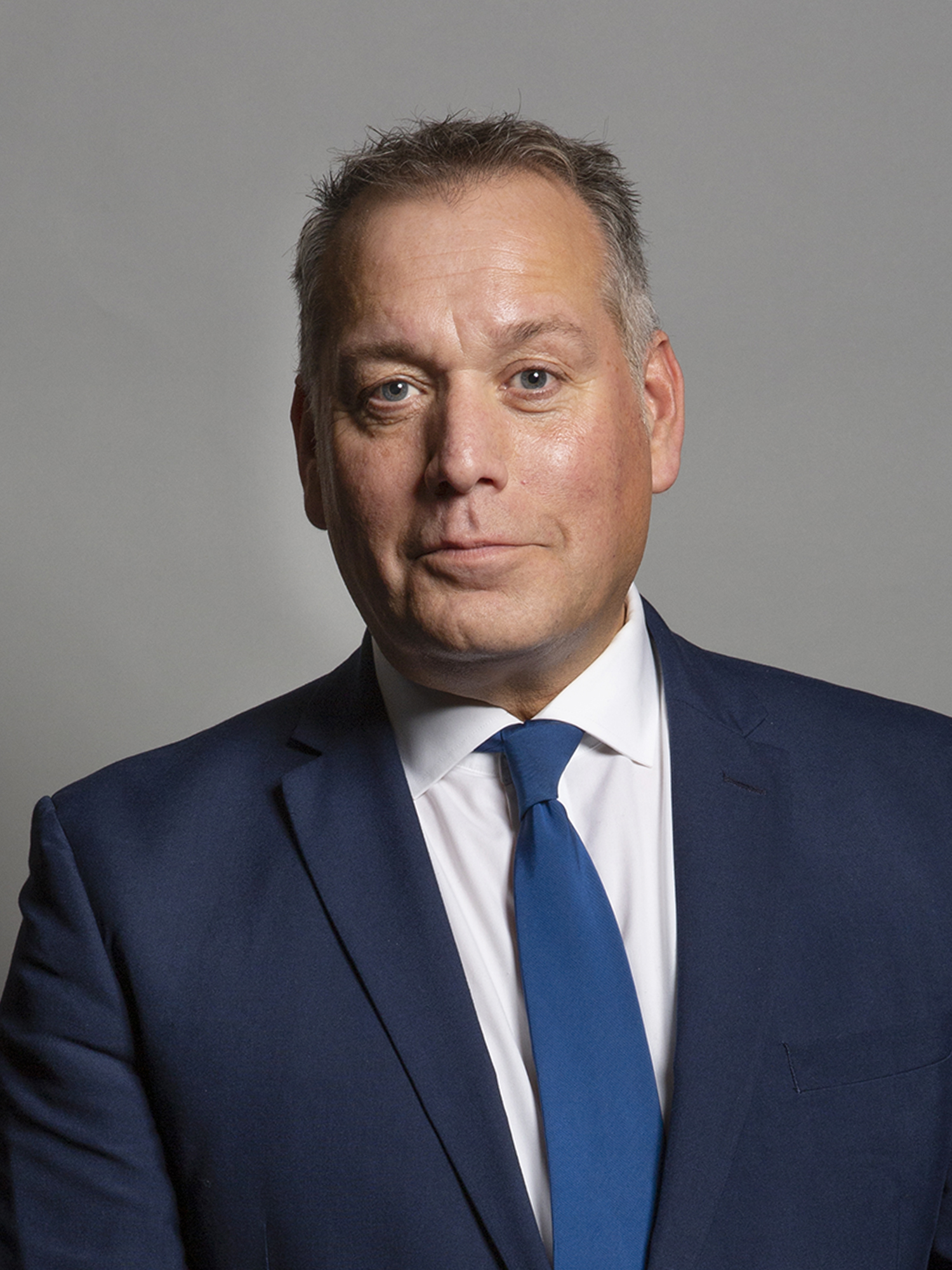
David Warburton was the MP for Somerton and Frome until his resignation in 2023

In April 2022, Warburton had the Conservative whip suspended following three allegations of sexual harassment pending investigation by the Independent Complaints and Grievance Scheme. He was admitted to a psychiatric hospital the same month for shock and stress. That November, Warburton was found to have breached the MP's code of conduct. The Parliamentary Commissioner for Standards, Kathryn Stone, found that there were two breaches of the code, but that they had been rectified after Warburton wrote to Stone "acknowledging and apologising".

In January 2023, Warburton revealed his intention to seek re-election at the 2024 general election. The following month, Frome Town Council unanimously passed a vote of no confidence in Warburton. Councillors accused him of failing to hold constituency surgeries since his suspension, which he denied. In April, calls were made for Warburton to resign after a year of absence from Parliament.

On 17 June 2023, Warburton announced his intention to resign to The Mail on Sunday, citing his feeling that the parliamentary watchdog denied him a fair hearing over claims he harassed two women. He admitted to taking cocaine after drinking whisky with a third woman. Warburton formally resigned from Parliament on 19 June.

The by-election took place on 20 July 2023, the same day as by-elections in Uxbridge and South Ruislip and Selby and Ainsty. They were the first by-elections being defended by the Conservatives under Rishi Sunak.

== Campaign ==
According to The Observer, Liberal Democrat insiders claimed that internal canvassing data showed the Conservatives narrowly in first place, on 42%, and the Liberal Democrats in second with 39.5%.

Three days before the by-election, The Guardian published an editorial supporting the Liberal Democrat candidate. Party leader Ed Davey visited the seat six times during the campaign.

== Candidates ==
Eight candidates contested the by-election.

The victorious candidate Liberal Democrat Sarah Dyke was selected as the prospective parliamentary candidate for the constituency in May 2022.

The Conservatives chose Yeovil Town Councillor and Somerset County Councillor Faye Purbrick as their candidate. The Green Party selected Somerset County Councillor Martin Dimery. Both Purbrick and Dimery were unsuccessful list candidates in the South West England constituency at the 2019 European elections.

Reform UK chose accountant and business owner Bruce Evans as their candidate. The Labour Party chose civil engineer and UNISON representative Neil Guild as their candidate. Guild was the Labour candidate for Taunton Deane in the 2015 general election.

Railway conductor Rosie Mitchell stood as an independent. The UK Independence Party chose military veteran and Somerton parish councillor Peter Richardson as their candidate. The Christian Peoples Alliance chose former councillor Lorna Corke as their candidate. She contested Wells for the party at the 2017 general election.

== Result ==
Bar chart of the election result.

2023 Somerton and Frome by-election
Party	Candidate	Votes	%	±%
Liberal Democrats	Sarah Dyke	21,187	54.6	▲28.4
Conservative	Faye Purbrick	10,179	26.2	▼29.6
Green	Martin Dimery	3,944	10.2	▲5.1
Reform	Bruce Evans	1,303	3.4	New
Labour	Neil Guild	1,009	2.6	▼10.3
Independent	Rosie Mitchell	635	1.6	New
UKIP	Peter Richardson	275	0.7	New
CPA	Lorna Corke	256	0.7	New
Rejected ballots		97	0.2	
Registered electors		87,921		
Majority		11,008	28.4	N/A
Turnout		38,885	44.2	▼31.4
Liberal Democrats gain from Conservative		Swing	▲29.0	

== Previous result ==
General election 2019: Somerton and Frome
Party	Candidate	Votes	%	±%
Conservative	David Warburton	36,230	55.8	▼0.9
Liberal Democrats	Adam Boyden	17,017	26.2	▲5.3
Labour	Sean Dromgoole	8,354	12.9	▼4.3
Green	Andrea Dexter	3,295	5.1	▲1.4
Majority		19,213	29.6	▼6.2
Turnout		64,896	75.6	▼0.2
Conservative hold		Swing	▼3.1	

== See also ==
- List of United Kingdom by-elections (2010–present)
- United Kingdom by-election records
- List of MPs elected in the 2019 United Kingdom general election
