= Glastonbury and Somerton =

UK Parliament constituency (since 2024)

- County constituency for the House of Commons
- Boundary of Glastonbury and Somerton in South West England
- County: Somerset
- Electorate: 70,015 (2023)
- Major settlements: Glastonbury, Street, Somerton, Wincanton and Bruton

Current constituency
- Created: 2024
- Member of Parliament: Sarah Dyke (Liberal Democrats)
- Seats: One
- Created from: Somerton and Frome, Wells & Yeovil

Glastonbury and Somerton is a constituency of the House of Commons in the UK Parliament. Further to the completion of the 2023 Periodic Review of Westminster constituencies, it was first contested at the 2024 general election. It has been represented since 2024 by Sarah Dyke of the Liberal Democrats.

== Constituency profile ==
Glastonbury and Somerton is a large rural constituency located in Somerset. The western part of the constituency lies within the Somerset Levels, a coastal plain and wetland area. The constituency is named after the small towns of Glastonbury and Somerton, although its largest settlement is the village of Street, which has a population of around 13,000. Other settlements include the small towns of Wincanton, Langport, Castle Cary and Bruton and the villages of Curry Rivel, Martock and Milborne Port. Glastonbury is a historic town known for its ruined abbey and the legends surrounding Glastonbury Tor. The town is perhaps best known for Glastonbury Festival, the world's largest green-field music festival, although it takes place outside the constituency boundaries. Most of the constituency is agricultural, and Wincanton has a large dairy industry. The constituency has average levels of deprivation and house prices are similar to the national average.

In general, residents are older and have average levels of education, income and professional employment compared to the rest of the country. White people made up 97% of the population at the 2021 census. At the county council, most of the constituency is represented by Liberal Democrats, although Conservatives were elected in Wincanton and Bruton. An estimated 53% of voters in the constituency supported leaving the European Union in the 2016 referendum, similar to the nationwide figure of 52%.

== Electoral history ==
In its coverage of the 2024 general election, the BBC had calculated that the changed boundaries made the new seat notionally Conservative; thus, when Sarah Dyke won the seat during the election, her victory was categorised as "Liberal Democrat gain from Conservative".

== Boundaries ==
Map of boundaries from 2024

Under the 2023 Periodic Review of Westminster constituencies, the constituency was defined as being composed of the following as they existed on 1 December 2020:

- The District of Mendip wards of: Butleigh and Baltonsborough; Glastonbury St. Benedict’s; Glastonbury St. Edmund’s; Glastonbury St. John’s; Glastonbury St. Mary’s; Street North; Street South; Street West.
- The District of South Somerset wards of: Blackmoor Vale; Bruton; Burrow Hill; Camelot; Cary; Curry Rivel, Huish & Langport; Hamdon; Islemoor; Martock; Milborne Port; Northstone, Ivelchester & St. Michael’s; Tower; Turn Hill; Wessex; Wincanton.

With effect from 1 April 2023, the Districts of Mendip and South Somerset were abolished and absorbed into the new unitary authority of Somerset. Consequently, the constituency now comprises the following electoral divisions of Somerset from the 2024 general election:

- Castle Cary; Curry Rivel and Langport; Glastonbury; Martock; Somerton; Street; Wincanton and Bruton; and small parts of Brympton, Coker, Mendip South, and South Petherton and Islemoor.

The seat is made up of the following areas of Somerset:

- Majority of the former Somerton and Frome constituency, including the communities of Bruton, Castle Cary, Langport, Martock, Somerton and Wincanton.
- Glastonbury and Street from the former Wells constituency.
- A small part transferred from the Yeovil constituency.

== Members of Parliament ==
Election	Member	Party
2024	Sarah Dyke	Liberal Democrat

== Elections ==
=== Elections in the 2020s ===
General election 2024: Glastonbury and Somerton
Party	Candidate	Votes	%	±%
Liberal Democrats	Sarah Dyke	20,364	42.7	+11.8
Conservative	Faye Purbrick	13,753	28.9	−28.6
Reform	Tom Carter	7,678	16.1	N/A
Labour	Hal Hooberman	3,111	6.5	−3.1
Green	Jon Cousins	2,736	5.7	+3.7
Majority		6,611	13.8	
Turnout		47,642	65.3	−10.7
Registered electors		73,268		
Liberal Democrats gain from Conservative		Swing	+20.2	

=== Elections in the 2010s ===
2019 notional result
Party	Vote	%
Conservative	30,606	57.5
Liberal Democrats	16,423	30.9
Labour	5,095	9.6
Green	1,070	2.0
Turnout	53,194	76.0
Electorate	70,015	
