= Playphone =

Mobile social gaming network

- Type: Private
- Industry: Mobile phones Social gaming
- Founded: February 6, 2003
- Founder: Ron Czerny
- Headquarters: San Jose, California, United States
- Area served: Global
- Key people: Ron Czerny (CEO)
- Number of employees: 3
- Parent: GungHo Online Entertainment
- Website: Playphone.com

Playphone is a mobile gaming platform founded in 2003 (merged and re-incorporated in 2006) headquartered in San Jose, California that provides direct-to-consumer mobile content distribution. It is funded by Menlo Ventures, Cardinal Venture Capital, and Coral Capital Management, and is a subsidiary of GungHo Online Entertainment.

== History ==
Playphone was founded on February 6, 2003 by Ron Czerny in Campbell, California, later moving to San Jose. The company initially sold pre-paid phone cards offering two mobile games, two polyphonic ringtones, and two wallpaper options. Early partners included Digital Bridges, offering access to game titles including Lara Croft Tomb Raider and Disney's The Lion King.

In September 2006, Playphone raised $9.1 million dollars in Series B funding from Menlo Ventures and Cardinal Venture Capital. That same month, Playphone partnered with RealNetworks to launch a subscription-based service (adapted from its RealArcade service) providing more games, ringtones, and wallpapers for mobile phones.

In May 2007, Playphone secured Series C funding of $18.75 million dollars from Scale Venture Capital, which was used to facilitate expansion into Latin America.

In May 2008, Playphone acquired Pitch Entertainment Group, a London-based mobile content distributor founded by David Warburton. The acquisition of Pitch enabled Playphone to expand into 20 countries across Africa, Asia and Europe. In June, Playphone partnered with Cellufun to provide mobile content to its users. Later that year, the company partnered with UK-based Top Up TV to showcase its mobile content in a Playphone-branded TV channel and signed new distribution agreements with Virgin Mobile USA and Cincinnati Bell.

In 2009, Playphone expanded a previous partnership with media optimization developer Vantrix. As part of the expansion, Playphone integrated the Vantrix Storefront Optimizer into their operations to sell content in the Asian mobile market.

In October 2010, Playphone announced the launch of a new mobile social gaming platform for smartphones and tablets called Playphone Social. The first game with support for the platform was launched in June 2011 – an Android port of their popular iOS game Playphone Poker.

In August 2011, Playphone declared a partnership with Perfect World, a Chinese-based mobile gaming company, to distribute the developer's games on Playphone Social. That December, Playphone commercially launched their new gaming network, the Playphone Social Gaming Network. To compete with other publishers such as OpenFeint and Ngmoco, Playphone’s new platform featured cross-platform multiplayer in addition to its social elements.

In March 2012 Playphone acquired SocialHour, a mobile social marketing firm, to strengthen their mobile marketing and distribution expertise in support of the growth and development of the Playphone Social Gaming Network.

Playphone's first carrier app store – Games Portal on Verizon – launched in 2013, coming preloaded on multiple Android devices.

In 2015, Playphone launched its store on the now-defunct CyanogenMod mobile operating system. Later that year, Japanese publisher GungHo Online Entertainment acquired 70% of Playphone's shares, making it a subsidiary of the company. The acquisition was undertaken in order to expand the reach of both companies into mobile markets in southern Asia. By late 2018 GungHo had removed any mention of Playphone at its old url, playphone.com.
