= David Heath (politician) =

British Liberal Democrat politician

The Right Honourable David Heath CBE
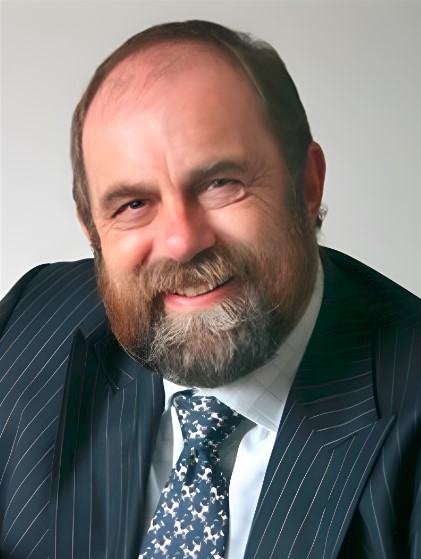
- Official portrait, 2012

Minister of State for Agriculture and Food
- In office 4 September 2012 – 7 October 2013
- Prime Minister: David Cameron
- Preceded by: James Paice
- Succeeded by: George Eustice

Deputy Leader of the House of Commons
- In office 14 May 2010 – 4 September 2012
- Prime Minister: David Cameron
- Preceded by: Barbara Keeley
- Succeeded by: Tom Brake

Liberal Democrat Leader of the House of Commons
- In office 8 January 2009 – 6 May 2010
- Leader: Nick Clegg
- Preceded by: Simon Hughes
- Succeeded by: Tom Brake (2015)
- In office 10 May 2005 – 20 December 2007
- Leader: Charles Kennedy; Menzies Campbell; Vince Cable
- Preceded by: Paul Tyler
- Succeeded by: Simon Hughes

Member of Parliament for Somerton and Frome
- In office 1 May 1997 – 30 March 2015
- Preceded by: Mark Robinson
- Succeeded by: David Warburton

Personal details
- Born: David William St John Heath; 16 March 1954 (age 72) Westbury-sub-Mendip, Somerset, England
- Party: Liberal Democrat
- Spouse: Caroline Netherton (m. 1987)
- Children: 2
- Education: St John's College, Oxford

David William St John Heath CBE PC (born 16 March 1954) is a British optometrist and Liberal Democrat politician. He was the Member of Parliament (MP) for Somerton and Frome from 1997 to 2015. He served as the Minister of State for Agriculture and Food from September 2012 to October 2013 in the Cameron–Clegg coalition government.

== Early life ==
Heath was born in Westbury-sub-Mendip in the Mendip Hills of Somerset. He was educated at Millfield Preparatory School and then Millfield School, an independent school in Street, Somerset. He then studied at St John's College at the University of Oxford, where he was awarded an MA in Physiological Sciences. He went on to study Ophthalmic Optics at the City University, London.

== Early career ==
Heath worked as a practising optometrist for seventeen years from 1979. He is also an honorary fellow of the College of Optometrists. He became a parliamentary consultant to the World Wide Fund for Nature in 1990, before joining Age Concern in the same capacity in 1991. He has worked for various other charities as a consultant since 1995.

== Political career ==
He was elected as a Liberal member of Somerset County Council in 1985, becoming the leader of the council 1985–1989. At the age of 31, he was the youngest ever leader of a county council. He remained as the Liberal Democrat group leader until 1991 and stood down from the council in 1997.

=== Westminster career ===
He unsuccessfully contested Somerton and Frome at the 1992 General Election where he was defeated by the new Conservative MP Mark Robinson by 4,341 votes. He was elected to the House of Commons at the 1997 General Election when he ousted Robinson at Somerton and Frome by just 130 votes and remained the MP until standing down in 2015. He made his maiden speech on 21 May 1997.

In Parliament he served on the Foreign Affairs Select Committee for two years from 1997 and at the same time was appointed as a frontbench spokesman on foreign affairs by Paddy Ashdown. He became an agriculture, fisheries and food spokesman under the new leadership of Charles Kennedy in 1999. Following the 2001 General Election he became a spokesman on work and pensions as well as serving as a member of the Science and Technology Select Committee. In 2003 he was appointed party spokesman on home affairs before moving to speak on the office of the Leader of the House of Commons and the Department for Constitutional Affairs in 2005, and then the Ministry of Justice in 2007. Heath was also a member of the Select Committee on the Modernisation of the House of Commons from 2005 to 2006.

Heath ran for the deputy leadership of the Liberal Democrats in 2006 and came third in the first round.

In March 2008 Heath was one of three Liberal Democrat spokesmen to defy the party whip and vote in favour of a referendum on the Treaty of Lisbon, for which he was sacked from his frontbench role. In October 2008 he was given a partial reprieve when he was chosen to lead a Liberal Democrat commission on privacy in the UK, and in January 2009 he was reappointed as spokesman on the office of the Leader of the House of Commons. In 2010, he was re-elected as MP for Somerton and Frome.

He was the vice-chairman of the all party groups on United Nations, Romania and the group on eye health and visual impairment. He was also the treasurer of the pharmacy group.

After over three years of service in the coalition government, Heath was sacked as a minister in a reshuffle and returned to the back benches, making his first appearance as back-bencher on 10 October 2013 during the business statement in which The Leader of the House of Commons, Andrew Lansley paid tribute to him for his service in the Government. Later that same week, he announced his intention to step down at the next UK General Election.

In March 2015, he was appointed to the Privy Council and therefore granted the title The Right Honourable.

== Personal life ==
CBE ribbon

He married Caroline Netherton in May 1987 in Somerset and they have a daughter (born May 1988) and a son (born May 1991); they live in the constituency at Witham Friary. He was the chairman of the Avon and Somerset Police Authority for three years from 1993. He became a Commander of the Order of the British Empire in 1989 and he used to breed pigs.

Parliament of the United Kingdom
Preceded by Mark Robinson	Member of Parliament for Somerton and Frome; 1997–2015	Succeeded by David Warburton
