= Somerton and Frome =

UK Parliament constituency (1983–2024)

Coordinates: 51.1000°N 2.5100°W

- Former county constituency for the House of Commons
- Boundary of Somerton and Frome in Somerset

- Location of Somerset within England
- County: Somerset
- Electorate: 87,921 (2011)
- Major settlements: Frome, Somerton, Wincanton and Martock

1983–2024
- Seats: One
- Created from: Wells (majority) and Yeovil (part)
- Replaced by: Glastonbury and Somerton (majority), Frome and East Somerset (part)

Somerton and Frome was a constituency (Note: A county constituency (for the purposes of election expenses and type of returning officer)) in Somerset represented in the House of Commons of the UK Parliament. (Note: As with all constituencies, the constituency elects one Member of Parliament (MP) by the first past the post system of election at least every five years.)

It was formerly represented by David Warburton, who was elected as a Conservative, but latterly sat as an independent after losing the Conservative whip in April 2022 following allegations of misconduct. Warburton resigned as an MP on 17 June 2023, thus triggering the first by-election in this constituency since its creation at the 1983 general election, which was won by Sarah Dyke of the Liberal Democrats.

Further to the completion of the 2023 Periodic Review of Westminster constituencies, the seat was abolished. Subject to major boundary changes – including incorporation of the town of Frome and surrounding rural areas in the former Mendip District into the newly created constituency of Frome and East Somerset, and the transferring in of the towns of Glastonbury and Street from the constituency of Wells (to be renamed Wells and Mendip Hills) to partly compensate – the constituency was reformed as Glastonbury and Somerton, to be first contested at the 2024 general election. Sarah Dyke, the winner of the 2023 by-election, became the inaugural MP for the succeeding constituency.

== Constituency profile ==
This area has a mixed economy, including agriculture and high-tech defence related industries. In November 2012, it had below the national average proportion of jobseekers (3.8%) at 1.6% of the population.

== Boundaries ==
Map of boundaries 2010–2024

1983–1997: The District of Yeovil wards of Blackmoor Vale, Brue, Burrow Hill, Camelot, Cary, Curry Rivel, Islemoor, Ivelchester, Langport and Huish, Martock, Milborne Port, Northstone, Turn Hill, Wessex, and Wincanton, and the District of Mendip wards of Beacon, Beckington and Rode, Coleford, Creech, Frome Badcox, Frome Fromefield, Frome Keyford, Mells, Nordinton, Postlebury, Selwood and Berkley, Stratton, and Vale.

1997–2010: The District of South Somerset wards of Blackmoor Vale, Brue, Burrow Hill, Camelot, Cary, Curry Rivel, Islemoor, Ivelchester, Langport and Huish, Martock, Milborne Port, Northstone, Turn Hill, Wessex, and Wincanton, and the District of Mendip wards of Beacon, Beckington and Rode, Coleford, Creech, Frome Badcox, Frome Fromefield, Frome Keyford, Frome Welshmill, Mells, Nordinton, Postlebury, Stratton, and Vale.

2010–2024: The District of South Somerset wards of Blackmoor Vale, Bruton, Burrow Hill, Camelot, Cary, Curry Rivel, Islemoor, Langport and Huish, Martock, Milborne Port, Northstone, Tower, Turn Hill, Wessex, and Wincanton, and the District of Mendip wards of Beacon, Beckington and Rode, Coleford, Creech, Frome Berkley Down, Frome Fromefield, Frome Keyford, Frome Park, Frome Welshmill, Mells, Nordinton, Postlebury, Stratton, and Vale.

The constituency was created in 1983 from parts of the seat of Wells. It covers the east of the district of Mendip and the north of the district of South Somerset.

== Members of Parliament ==
Election	Member	Party	Notes
1983	Robert Boscawen	Conservative	Member for Wells (1970–1983)
1992	Mark Robinson	Conservative	Member for Newport West (1983–1987)
1997	David Heath	Liberal Democrats	Deputy Leader of the House of Commons (2010–2012); Minister for Agriculture and Food (2012–2013)
2015	David Warburton	Conservative	
2022	David Warburton	Independent	
2023 by-election	Sarah Dyke	Liberal Democrats	Contested Glastonbury and Somerton following redistribution
2024	Constituency abolished, replaced by Glastonbury and Somerton		

== Elections ==
=== Elections in the 2020s ===
2023 Somerton and Frome by-election
Party	Candidate	Votes	%	±%
Liberal Democrats	Sarah Dyke	21,187	54.6	+28.4
Conservative	Faye Purbrick	10,179	26.2	−29.6
Green	Martin Dimery	3,944	10.2	+5.1
Reform	Bruce Evans	1,303	3.4	New
Labour	Neil Guild	1,009	2.6	−10.3
Independent	Rosie Mitchell	635	1.6	New
UKIP	Peter Richardson	275	0.7	New
CPA	Lorna Corke	256	0.7	New
Majority		11,008	28.4	N/A
Turnout		38,788	44.2	−31.4
Liberal Democrats gain from Conservative		Swing	+29.0	

=== Elections in the 2010s ===
General election 2019: Somerton and Frome
Party	Candidate	Votes	%	±%
Conservative	David Warburton	36,230	55.8	–0.9
Liberal Democrats	Adam Boyden	17,017	26.2	+5.3
Labour	Sean Dromgoole	8,354	12.9	–4.3
Green	Andrea Dexter	3,295	5.1	+1.4
Majority		19,213	29.6	–6.2
Turnout		64,896	75.6	–0.2
Conservative hold		Swing	–3.1	

General election 2017: Somerton and Frome
Party	Candidate	Votes	%	±%
Conservative	David Warburton	36,231	56.7	+3.7
Liberal Democrats	Mark Blackburn	13,325	20.9	+1.5
Labour	Sean Dromgoole	10,998	17.2	+9.9
Green	Theo Simon	2,347	3.7	–5.3
Independent	Richard Hadwin	991	1.6	New
Majority		22,906	35.8	+2.2
Turnout		63,892	75.8	+3.6
Conservative hold		Swing	+2.4	

General election 2015: Somerton and Frome
Party	Candidate	Votes	%	±%
Conservative	David Warburton	31,960	53.0	+8.5
Liberal Democrats	David Rendel	11,692	19.4	−28.1
UKIP	Alan Dimmick	6,439	10.7	+7.5
Green	Theo Simon	5,434	9.0	New
Labour	David Oakensen	4,419	7.3	+2.9
Independent	Ian Angell	365	0.6	New
Majority		20,268	33.6	N/A
Turnout		60,309	72.2	−2.1
Conservative gain from Liberal Democrats		Swing	+18.3	

General election 2010: Somerton and Frome
Party	Candidate	Votes	%	±%
Liberal Democrats	David Heath	28,793	47.5	+3.8
Conservative	Annunziata Rees-Mogg	26,976	44.5	+1.9
Labour	David Oakensen	2,675	4.4	−6.4
UKIP	Barry Harding	1,932	3.2	+1.3
Independent	Niall Warry	236	0.4	New
Majority		1,817	3.0	+1.9
Turnout		60,612	74.3	+5.1
Liberal Democrats hold		Swing	+0.9	

=== Elections in the 2000s ===
General election 2005: Somerton and Frome
Party	Candidate	Votes	%	±%
Liberal Democrats	David Heath	23,759	43.9	+0.3
Conservative	Clive Allen	22,947	42.4	0.0
Labour	Joseph Pestell	5,865	10.8	−0.8
UKIP	Bill Lukins	1,047	1.9	+0.2
Veritas	Carl Beaman	484	0.9	New
Majority		812	1.5	+0.3
Turnout		54,102	70.7	+1.4
Liberal Democrats hold		Swing	+0.2	

General election 2001: Somerton and Frome
Party	Candidate	Votes	%	±%
Liberal Democrats	David Heath	22,983	43.6	+4.1
Conservative	Jonathan Marland	22,315	42.4	+3.1
Labour	Andy Perkins	6,113	11.6	−4.7
UKIP	Peter Bridgwood	919	1.7	+1.1
Liberal	Jean Pollock	354	0.7	New
Majority		668	1.2	+1.0
Turnout		52,684	69.3	−8.0
Liberal Democrats hold		Swing	+0.5	

=== Elections in the 1990s ===
General election 1997: Somerton and Frome
Party	Candidate	Votes	%	±%
Liberal Democrats	David Heath	22,684	39.5	−0.7
Conservative	Mark Robinson	22,554	39.3	−8.2
Labour	Robert Ashford	9,385	16.3	+5.9
Referendum	Robert Rodwell	2,449	4.3	New
UKIP	R.P. Gadd	331	0.6	New
Majority		130	0.2	N/A
Turnout		57,403	77.3	−5.4
Liberal Democrats gain from Conservative		Swing	+4.5	

General election 1992: Somerton and Frome
Party	Candidate	Votes	%	±%
Conservative	Mark Robinson	28,052	47.5	−6.2
Liberal Democrats	David Heath	23,711	40.2	+3.9
Labour	Robert Ashford	6,154	10.4	+0.4
Green	Ms. LA Graham	742	1.3	New
Liberal	Ms. J Pollock	388	0.7	New
Majority		4,341	7.3	−10.1
Turnout		59,047	82.7	+3.3
Registered electors		71,354		
Conservative hold		Swing	−5.1	

=== Elections in the 1980s ===
General election 1987: Somerton and Frome
Party	Candidate	Votes	%	±%
Conservative	Robert Boscawen	29,351	53.7	−0.7
Liberal	Rowland Morgan	19,813	36.3	+0.5
Labour	Ian Kelly	5,461	10.0	+0.2
Majority		9,538	17.4	−1.2
Turnout		54,625	79.4	+2.7
Registered electors		68,773		
Conservative hold		Swing	-0.6	

General election 1983: Somerton and Frome
Party	Candidate	Votes	%	±%
Conservative	Robert Boscawen	26,988	54.4	+2.0
SDP	Nicholas Hinton	17,761	35.8	+5.6
Labour	Jeffrey Osborn	4,867	9.8	–7.0
Majority		9,227	18.6	–3.6
Turnout		49,616	76.7	
Registered electors		64,695		
Conservative hold		Swing	–1.8	

1979 notional result
Party	Vote	%
Conservative	25,264	52.4
Liberal	14,562	30.2
Labour	8,092	16.8
Others	322	0.7
Turnout	48,240	
Electorate		

== See also ==
- List of parliamentary constituencies in Somerset
