= David Warburton =

British Conservative MP (1965–2025)

David Warburton FRSA
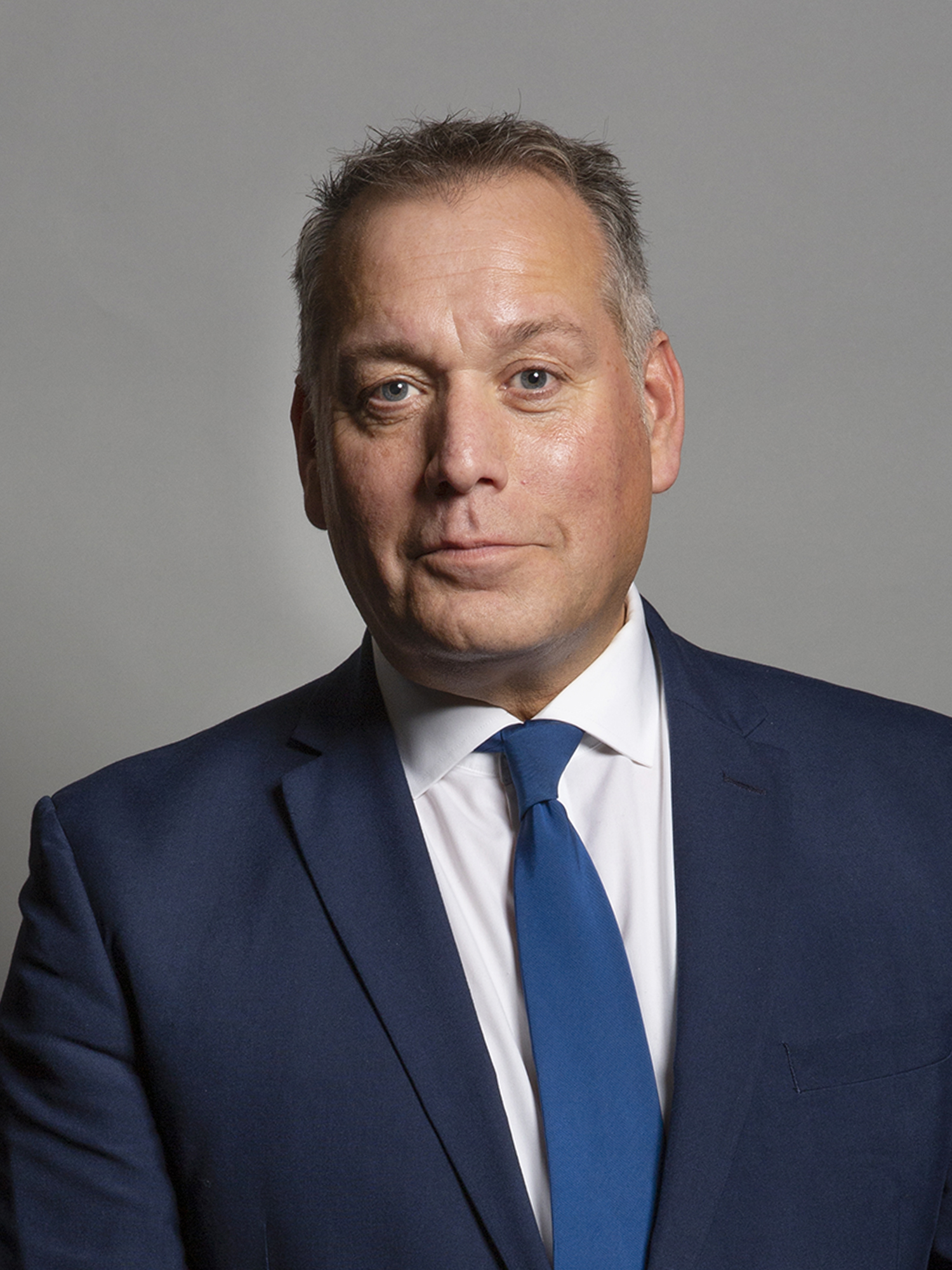
- Official portrait, 2019

Member of Parliament for Somerton and Frome
- In office 7 May 2015 – 19 June 2023
- Preceded by: David Heath
- Succeeded by: Sarah Dyke

Personal details
- Born: David John Warburton; 28 October 1965 Reading, Berkshire, England
- Died: 26 August 2025 (aged 59) London, England
- Party: Conservative (suspended 2022)
- Spouse: Harriet Baker-Bates (m. 2002; div. 2024)
- Children: 2
- Education: Royal College of Music (Dip.RCM); King's College London (MMus)

David John Warburton (28 October 1965 – 26 August 2025) was a British Conservative politician who served as the Member of Parliament (MP) for Somerton and Frome from 2015 until 2023.

On his election in the 2015 general election he represented the Conservative Party, but was suspended from the party in April 2022 pending the outcome of an Independent Complaints and Grievance Scheme (ICGS) investigation into allegations of harassment and class A drug use. On 17 June 2023, Warburton announced his resignation as an MP, triggering a by-election. On 16 July 2023 an investigation into the allegations against Warburton was closed as "materially flawed" with the comment "the complainant has withdrawn her complaint".

Prior to entering politics, he was the founder, chief executive and chairman of Pitch Entertainment Group.

== Early life ==
David John Warburton was born on 28 October 1965 in Reading, Berkshire. He was educated at the state grammar Reading School, and the co-educational comprehensive secondary, Waingels College.

After a variety of jobs, including several years as a shop assistant, a cleaner and a van driver while singing, playing lead guitar and keyboards in a succession of rock bands, he studied at the Royal College of Music, where he was a recipient of the Octavia Scholarship. He graduated with a diploma in music composition. While there, he studied under Edwin Roxburgh and Jeremy Dale Roberts, and also with George Benjamin. He was the composition faculty representative on the Student Association Committee. He gained a M.Mus. degree at King's College London.

He then studied towards an M.Phil. and Ph.D. at King's College London as a Ralph Vaughan Williams Trust Scholar, under the supervision of Sir Harrison Birtwistle.

Warburton taught for five years at an inner-city mixed community school, Hurlingham and Chelsea Secondary School, as a classroom and peripatetic teacher of music.

== Business career ==
Warburton founded The Music Solution Ltd (TMS) in 1999 (later SplashMobile.com and Pitch Entertainment Group), initially providing downloadable music content to mobile phone networks and brands, and later a payment and services provider for mobile content. Pitch was listed by the Sunday Times as the UK's 6th fastest growing technology company, and in 2008, the US mobile content provider PlayPhone Inc acquired the company.

In 2009, Warburton set up the listed building property restoration and development companies Oflang Ltd. and Oflang Partners LLP, and with Loaye Agabani and Tim Lewis launched the online business MyHigh.St in Somerset in 2012, for local independent retailers to offer their products online.

After leaving politics, Warburton became a director for the Capenex group of companies in 2024.

== Political career ==
Warburton was Treasurer of Wells Conservative Association from 2009 to 2010 and its Political Deputy Chairman and Constituency Spokesperson from 2010 to 2012. In February 2013, he was selected as a parliamentary candidate for Somerton and Frome, defeating Ivan Massow.

At the 2015 general election, he was elected with 53% of the vote – and, at 18.3%, with the largest constituency swing to the Conservative Party – after David Heath, who had held the seat for the Liberal Democrats since 1997, stepped down.

In April 2016, Warburton was one of five Conservative MPs to rebel by voting against the Government whip in favour of an opposition amendment tabled by Lord Dubs demanding that Britain take in vulnerable children from refugee camps in Calais and Dunkirk, which presaged an eventual Government U-turn. He supported Brexit in the 2016 referendum, and claimed his family had received death threats over the issue.

Warburton sat on several all-party parliamentary groups (APPGs) including the British Council APPG, Chair of the APPG for Music, and vice-chair of both the APPG for Blockchain, and Small and Micro Business. He also sat on the European Scrutiny Committee, and between 2016 and 2017 chaired the British Council's Building Resilience to Radicalisation Inquiry.

Warburton was re-elected at the 2017 general election with an increased vote share of 57% and an increased majority of 22,906, and in January 2018 he was appointed Parliamentary Private Secretary to the Department for Education.

Warburton employed his wife as a communications officer/personal assistant. He was listed in Daily Telegraph and Guardian articles in 2015 criticising the practice of MPs employing family members, on the grounds that it promotes nepotism. Although MPs who were first elected in 2017 were banned from employing family members, the restriction was not retrospective – meaning that Warburton's employment of his wife was lawful.

Following allegations of misconduct, Warburton formally resigned from Parliament on 19 June 2023. Liberal Democrat Sarah Dyke won Warburton's seat in the by-election triggered by his resignation, replacing a 19,213 Conservative majority with one of 11,008 for her party in July of that year.

=== Withdrawal of whip ===
In April 2022, he had the Conservative whip withdrawn pending the outcome of an investigation by Parliament's ICGS into allegations that he sexually harassed three women, all of which were eventually dismissed or withdrawn. Suffering from severe shock and stress following the allegations, Warburton was admitted to a psychiatric hospital.

In November 2022 the Parliamentary Commissioner for Standards found that Warburton had breached the MPs' code of conduct after failing to declare a £150,000 loan from Russian businessman Roman Joukovski. Warburton received the loan in August 2017, through a Seychelles shell company, and said did not declare it because it was "entirely unconnected with either my role as an MP or any parliamentary activities". Warburton insisted that the loan had "in no way … influenced my words or actions as a Member". As the Commissioner, Kathryn Stone, was satisfied the loan had not influenced Warburton, the breach was rectified upon Warburton's formal acknowledgement and apology to the commission.

In January 2023, Warburton revealed his intention to seek re-election at the 2024 general election. The following month, a Sunday Times investigation claimed Warburton failed to disclose a £25,000 donation from a billionaire, to have used a forged document in an £800,000 mortgage application, and to have concealed an interest in a property firm. In response, Frome Town Council unanimously passed a vote of no confidence in Warburton, and in April, calls were made for Warburton to resign after a year of absence from parliament.

On 17 June 2023, Warburton announced his intention to resign to the Mail on Sunday, claiming that the parliamentary harassment watchdog denied him a fair hearing over claims he harassed two women. He admitted to taking cocaine after drinking whisky with a third woman. After resigning, Warburton said that the MeToo movement's "pendulum has swung too far" and that he wanted it to "swing back" to a "fair place". He apologised for using cocaine, but denied sexual misconduct.

In July 2023, The Independent Expert Panel (IEP) of judges overturned both the Parliamentary Commissioner for Standards and the ICGS, ruling that "the allegation that the complaint was fabricated" and should be investigated by the parliamentary investigative authorities, after which the claimant withdrew all allegations against the then former MP.

== Philanthropy ==
Until 2017 Warburton was a Trustee of the Down's Syndrome support charity Ups and Downs Southwest.

Until 2022 he was a Trustee of the national youth music charity Music for Youth. In June 2018 he joined the Board of the National Youth Orchestra of Great Britain and was appointed chair of its Development Board. He was also a Trustee of British Youth Music Theatre.

== Personal life and death ==
Warburton was married to public relations professional Harriet Baker-Bates for over 20 years. They divorced in 2024.

He was a member of Mensa, and a Fellow of the Royal Society of Arts.

Warburton died suddenly from a suspected pulmonary embolism at his home in Chelsea, London, on 26 August 2025, aged 59. The Metropolitan Police stated that his death was "unexpected but not suspicious".

Parliament of the United Kingdom
Preceded by David Heath	Member of Parliament for Somerton and Frome; 2015–2023	Succeeded by Sarah Dyke
