= Sarah Dyke =

British politician (born 1971)

Sarah Dyke MP
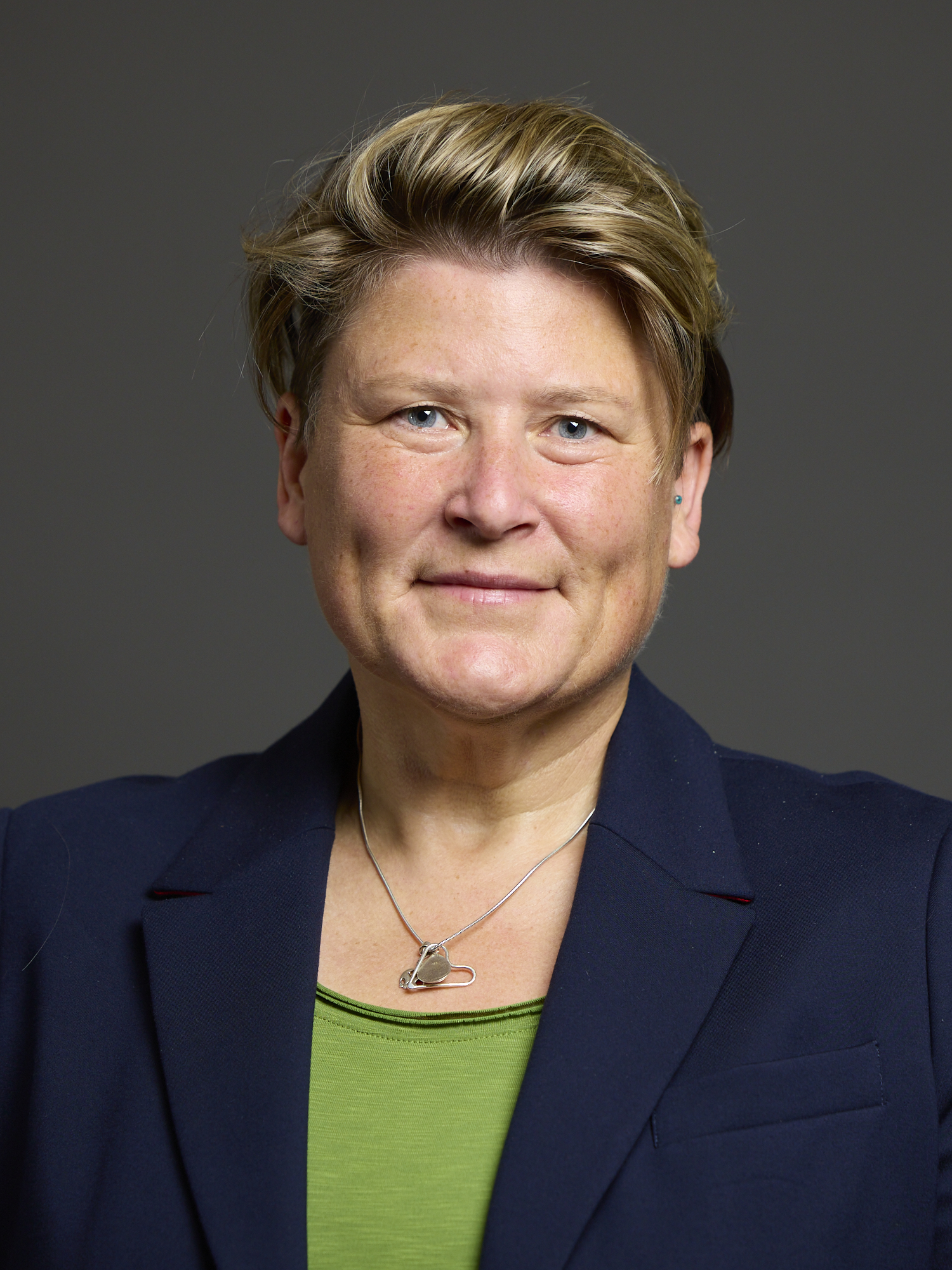
- Official portrait, 2024

Member of Parliament for Glastonbury and Somerton Somerton and Frome (2023–2024)
- Incumbent
- Assumed office 20 July 2023
- Preceded by: David Warburton
- Majority: 6,611 (13.9%)

Liberal Democrat spokesperson for Rural Affairs
- Incumbent
- Assumed office 1 October 2025 Serving with Tim Farron
- Leader: Ed Davey

Member of Somerset Council for Blackmoor Vale
- In office 9 May 2022 – 17 October 2024
- Preceded by: Division established

Personal details
- Born: 1971 (age 54–55)
- Party: Liberal Democrats
- Education: Harper Adams University
- Website: www.sarahdyke.uk

Sarah Joanne Dyke (born 1971) is a British Liberal Democrat politician. She has been Member of Parliament (MP) for Glastonbury and Somerton since 2024 and was previously MP for Somerton and Frome from 2023 to 2024.

== Early life and education ==
Sarah Joanne Dyke was born in 1971 and comes from a Somerset farming family that can be traced back more than 250 years to the local area. She was privately educated at Warminster School and studied agricultural and business studies at Harper Adams University.

== Local government career ==
Dyke represented Blackmoor Vale on Somerset Council from the 2022 election, and was the council's lead member for environment and climate change, until June 2023. Prior to this she served as Milborne Port councillor on South Somerset District Council having been first elected in 2015, re-elected in 2019 and appointed Portfolio Holder for Environment. She also chaired the regeneration board for South Somerset District Council for a short period from August 2021 until funding for the project was paused in 2022.

== Parliamentary career ==
Dyke was selected as the Liberal Democrat prospective parliamentary candidate for the constituency of Somerton and Frome in May 2022. On 17 June 2023, David Warburton, MP for Somerton and Frome since 2015, announced his intention to resign from Parliament following allegations of sexual harassment. During her campaign it was reported that Dyke was a supporter of Extinction Rebellion.

At the July 2023 by-election, Dyke was elected as an MP with 54.6 per cent of the vote and a majority of 11,008, on a swing of 29.0 per cent from the Conservatives to the Liberal Democrats. On her election, she commented on the absence of her predecessor, saying: "Instead of an absent Conservative MP letting you down, you have an active Lib Dem MP lifting you up." She was sworn in as an MP on 4 September following the parliamentary summer recess, along with Keir Mather and Steve Tuckwell. Mather, from the Labour Party, was elected for Selby and Ainsty, and Tuckwell, from the Conservative Party, was elected for Uxbridge and South Ruislip in two by-elections held on the same day as Dyke's.

Following the 2023 review of Westminster constituencies, Somerton and Frome was abolished as a parliamentary constituency, to form two new constituencies: Glastonbury and Somerton and Frome and East Somerset, which were contested for the first time at the 2024 general election. Dyke was re-elected to Parliament to represent Glastonbury and Somerton, with 42.7 per cent of the vote and a majority of 6,611 over the second-placed Conservative candidate. The BBC calculated that the changed boundaries made the new seat notionally Conservative, so categorised Dyke's victory as a Liberal Democrat gain from the Conservatives.

== Personal life ==
At the time of her election Dyke owned sixty sheep, four dogs and a cat, and ran a second-hand goods business, Vintage Ghetto.

In 2024, PinkNews listed Dyke among a number of out LGBTQ+ parliamentarians.

Parliament of the United Kingdom
Preceded by David Warburton	Member of Parliament for Somerton and Frome; 2023–2024	Constituency abolished
New constituency	Member of Parliament for Glastonbury and Somerton; 2024–present	Incumbent
