= List of United Kingdom MPs by seniority (2019–2024) =

This is the list of United Kingdom MPs by seniority, 2019–2024. The Members of Parliament (MPs), who were elected in the 2019 general election and during the 58th Parliament, are ranked by the beginning of their terms in office in the House of Commons.

== Criteria ==
The seniority criteria used in this article are derived from how the Father of the House is selected. They are not laid down in Standing Orders but arise from the customary practice of the House of Commons. The modern custom is that the Father of the House is the MP who has the longest continuous service. If two or more members were first elected in the same General Election (or at by-elections held on the same day), then priority is given to the one who was sworn in first. The order of swearing in is recorded in the House of Commons Journal, the official record of proceedings.

When a member has had broken service, that does not affect his or her seniority (for the purpose of qualifying as the Father of the House) which is based on the latest period of continuous service.

The Sinn Féin members, who abstain from taking their seats at Westminster, have never been sworn in. They are ranked (in this list) after all other members who have taken their seats. Between themselves, they are ranked by the first date of the election, for the current period of continuous service. If they are equal on that criterion, then they are ranked in alphabetical order by surname.

== Summary of members elected by party ==
The following was the composition of the Commons at dissolution at 00:01, Thursday 30 May 2024, when all 650 seats became vacant pending the 2024 United Kingdom general election.

| Affiliation | Members | | |
| Affiliation | Elected in 2019 | At dissolution in 2024 (Note: On 29 May 2024, the UK Parliamentary website stated there were 345 Conservative MPs and 205 Labour MPs. However it describes Lloyd Russell-Moyle and Mark Logan as Labour and Conservative MPs respectively at the time of dissolution, despite Logan having defected from the Conservatives and Rusell-Moyle having lost the Labour Party whip prior to dissolution.) | Difference |
|---|---|---|---|
| Conservative | 365 | 344 | ▼21 |
| Labour (Note: Includes 24 MPs sponsored by the Co-operative Party, who are designated Labour and Co-operative.) | 202 | 205 | ▲3 |
| SNP | 48 | 43 | ▼5 |
| Liberal Democrats | 11 | 15 | ▲4 |
| DUP | 8 | 7 | ▼1 |
| Sinn Féin | 7 | 7 | Steady |
| Plaid Cymru | 4 | 3 | ▼1 |
| SDLP | 2 | 2 | Steady |
| Alba | N/A (Note: At the time of the 2019 election this party did not exist.) | 2 (Note: Both of the Alba Party's MPs, Kenny MacAskill and Neale Hanvey, were elected for the Scottish National Party (SNP) before leaving to join Alba in 2021.) | ▲2 |
| Green (E&W) | 1 | 1 | Steady |
| Alliance (NI) | 1 | 1 | Steady |
| Workers Party | N/A | 1 | ▲1 |
| Reform (Note: Known as the Brexit Party at the 2019 election.) | 0 | 1 | ▲1 |
| Speaker | 1 | 1 | Steady |
| Independent | 0 | 17 (Note: At the time of the dissolution of Parliament on 30 May 2024, eight of the independent MPs had been elected as Conservatives at the 2019 general election, including Andrew Bridgen, who defected to Reclaim in May 2023 but left the party in December 2023 and for the remainder of the 2019–2024 Parliament sat as an independent. The remaining nine independent MPs all came from the opposition benches.) | ▲17 |
| Vacant | 0 | 0 | Steady |
| Total | 650 | 650 | Steady |
| Effective total voting (Note: In 2019–24, the seven members of Sinn Féin abstained; i.e., they did not take their seats in the House of Commons; the speaker and deputy speakers (at this Parliament's dissolution, three Conservative and one Labour) by convention exercise only a casting vote.) | 639 | 638 | ▼1 (Note: Deputy speaker Eleanor Laing (Con, Chair of Ways and Means) was on an extended leave of absence, and Roger Gale (Con) served as an additional acting deputy speaker from December 2022 until the end of the Parliament.) |
| Majority | 87 | 44 | ▼43 |

For full details of changes during the 2019–2024 Parliament, see By-elections and Defections, suspensions and resignations.

== List ==
This article assigns a numerical rank to each of the members elected in the 2019 general election and subsequent by-elections, except for those who were elected but never sworn in, who are displayed at the bottom without a number. Members named in italics and shaded in pink were no longer sitting when Parliament was dissolved on 30 May 2024.

| Rank | Member | Party | Constituency 2019 | Elected | Notes |
|---|---|---|---|---|---|
47th Parliament (elected: 10 October 1974, first met: 22 October 1974, dissolved: 7 April 1979)
| 001 | Sir Peter Bottomley | Con | Worthing West | 26 Jun 1975 | Father of the House. Elected at the 1975 Woolwich West by-election. |
48th Parliament (elected: 3 May 1979, first met: 9 May 1979, dissolved: 13 May 1983)
| 002 | Barry Sheerman | Lab | Huddersfield | 3 May 1979 | Oldest Labour MP |
| 003 | The Rt Hon Harriet Harman | Lab | Camberwell and Peckham | 28 Oct 1982 | Elected at the 1982 Peckham by-election. Longest-ever continuously-serving female MP. Chair of the Joint Committee on Human Rights. Former Labour Leader and Leader of the Opposition 2010 and 2015 |
49th Parliament (elected: 9 June 1983, first met: 15 June 1983, dissolved: 18 May 1987)
| 004 | The Rt Hon Sir Edward Leigh | Con | Gainsborough | 9 Jun 1983 | |
| 005 | The Rt Hon Nick Brown | Ind | Newcastle upon Tyne East | 9 Jun 1983 | Former Chief Whip of the Labour Party. Labour Party whip was suspended in September 2022. Resigned from Labour Party in December 2023. |
| 006 | The Rt Hon Jeremy Corbyn | Ind | Islington North | 9 Jun 1983 | Former Labour Party Leader and Leader of the Opposition. Labour Party whip was suspended in October 2020. Expelled from Labour Party in May 2024. |
| 007 | Sir David Amess | Con | Southend West | 9 Jun 1983 | Murdered 15 October 2021 |
| 008 | The Rt Hon Sir Roger Gale | Con | North Thanet | 9 Jun 1983 | |
| 009 | The Rt Hon Dame Margaret Beckett | Lab | Derby South | 9 Jun 1983 | Longest ever serving female MP (non-continuous service). Chair of the Joint Committee on the National Security Strategy, former foreign secretary (2006–07), deputy Labour leader (1992–94), Labour leader and Leader of the Opposition (1994). Previously served Oct 1974–79, and the only sitting MP elected in the October 1974 general election. |
| 010 | Sir Bill Cash | Con | Stone | 3 May 1984 | Elected at the 1984 Stafford by-election. Oldest MP elected in the 2019 election. Chair of the European Scrutiny Committee |
| 011 | The Rt Hon Sir George Howarth | Lab | Knowsley | 13 Nov 1986 | Elected at the 1986 Knowsley North by-election. |
50th Parliament (elected: 11 June 1987, first met: 17 June 1987, dissolved: 16 March 1992)
| 012 | The Rt Hon Sir John Redwood | Con | Wokingham | 11 Jun 1987 | Former Secretary of State for Wales |
| 013 | The Rt Hon Diane Abbott | Lab | Hackney North and Stoke Newington | 11 Jun 1987 | Longest serving Black MP in the House of Commons. Former Shadow Home Secretary. Labour Party whip was suspended in April 2023, but restored June 2024. |
51st Parliament (elected: 9 April 1992, first met: 27 April 1992, dissolved: 8 April 1997)
| 014 | The Rt Hon Sir Liam Fox | Con | North Somerset | 9 Apr 1992 | Former Secretary of State for Defence, Secretary of State for International Trade and President of the Board of Trade. |
| 015 | The Rt Hon Sir Oliver Heald | Con | North East Hertfordshire | 9 Apr 1992 | Former Shadow Secretary of State for Justice |
| 016 | Sir Geoffrey Clifton-Brown | Con | The Cotswolds | 9 Apr 1992 | |
| 017 | Sir Gary Streeter | Con | South West Devon | 9 Apr 1992 | |
| 018 | Sir Michael Fabricant | Con | Lichfield | 9 Apr 1992 | |
| 019 | Clive Betts | Lab | Sheffield South East | 9 Apr 1992 | Chair of the Levelling Up, Housing and Communities Select Committee |
| 020 | Sir Paul Beresford | Con | Mole Valley | 9 Apr 1992 | Former chair of the Administration Committee |
| 021 | The Rt Hon Sir Iain Duncan Smith | Con | Chingford and Woodford Green | 9 Apr 1992 | Former Leader of the Conservative Party, Leader of the Opposition and Work and Pensions Secretary |
| 022 | The Rt Hon Nigel Evans | Con | Ribble Valley | 9 Apr 1992 | Second Deputy Chairman of Ways and Means |
| 023 | The Rt Hon Dame Cheryl Gillan | Con | Chesham and Amersham | 9 Apr 1992 | Former Secretary of State for Wales, died 4 April 2021 |
| 024 | The Hon Sir Bernard Jenkin | Con | Harwich and North Essex | 9 Apr 1992 | Chair of the Liaison Committee |
| 025 | Dame Angela Eagle | Lab | Wallasey | 9 Apr 1992 | Former Shadow First Secretary of State |
| 026 | The Rt Hon Sir John Whittingdale | Con | Maldon | 9 Apr 1992 | Former Secretary of State for Culture, Media and Sport |
| 027 | The Rt Hon John Spellar | Lab | Warley | 9 Apr 1992 | Previously served 1982–83 |
| 028 | The Rt Hon Dame Margaret Hodge | Lab | Barking | 9 Jun 1994 | Elected at the 1994 Barking by-election. |
| 029 | The Rt Hon Sir Stephen Timms | Lab | East Ham | 9 Jun 1994 | Elected at the 1994 Newham North East by-election. Chair of the Work and Pensions Select Committee |
| 030 | Jon Trickett | Lab | Hemsworth | 1 Feb 1996 | Elected at the 1996 Hemsworth by-election. Former Shadow Minister for the Cabinet Office |
52nd Parliament (elected: 1 May 1997, first met: 7 May 1997, dissolved: 14 May 2001)
| 031 | The Rt Hon Sir Julian Lewis | Con | New Forest East | 1 May 1997 | Chair of the Intelligence and Security Committee. |
| 032 | The Rt Hon Owen Paterson | Con | North Shropshire | 1 May 1997 | Former Secretary of State for Environment, Food and Rural Affairs & Secretary of State for Northern Ireland. Resigned on 4 November 2021 triggering 2021 North Shropshire by-election. |
| 033 | Laurence Robertson | Con | Tewkesbury | 1 May 1997 | |
| 034 | Sir Robert Syms | Con | Poole | 1 May 1997 | |
| 035 | The Rt Hon Sir Ben Bradshaw | Lab | Exeter | 1 May 1997 | Former Secretary of State for Culture, Media and Sport |
| 036 | The Rt Hon Sir Jeffrey Donaldson | Ind | Lagan Valley | 1 May 1997 | Former Leader of the Democratic Unionist Party. DUP Whip suspended March 2024. |
| 037 | The Rt Hon John McDonnell | Lab | Hayes and Harlington | 1 May 1997 | Former Shadow Chancellor of the Exchequer |
| 038 | Gareth Thomas | Lab | Harrow West | 1 May 1997 | |
| 039 | The Rt Hon Dame Eleanor Laing | Con | Epping Forest | 1 May 1997 | Chairman of Ways and Means |
| 040 | The Rt Hon Sir Lindsay Hoyle | Spe | Chorley | 1 May 1997 | Speaker of the House of Commons |
| 041 | The Rt Hon John Healey | Lab | Wentworth and Dearne | 1 May 1997 | Shadow Secretary of State for Defence |
| 042 | Tim Loughton | Con | East Worthing and Shoreham | 1 May 1997 | |
| 043 | The Rt Hon Lady May (Theresa May) | Con | Maidenhead | 1 May 1997 | Former leader of the Conservative Party, prime minister and home secretary |
| 044 | The Rt Hon Sir Graham Brady | Con | Altrincham and Sale West | 1 May 1997 | Chair of the 1922 Committee |
| 045 | The Rt Hon Nick Gibb | Con | Bognor Regis and Littlehampton | 1 May 1997 | |
| 046 | Alan Whitehead | Lab | Southampton Test | 1 May 1997 | |
| 047 | Barry Gardiner | Lab | Brent North | 1 May 1997 | Former Shadow Secretary of State for International Trade |
| 048 | The Rt Hon Sir Desmond Swayne | Con | New Forest West | 1 May 1997 | |
| 049 | Fabian Hamilton | Lab | Leeds North East | 1 May 1997 | |
| 050 | The Rt Hon Damian Green | Con | Ashford | 1 May 1997 | Former First Secretary of State and Minister for the Cabinet Office |
| 051 | James Gray | Con | North Wiltshire | 1 May 1997 | |
| 052 | The Rt Hon Sir Alan Campbell | Lab | Tynemouth | 1 May 1997 | Labour Chief Whip |
| 053 | The Rt Hon Maria Eagle | Lab | Garston and Halewood | 1 May 1997 | Former Shadow Secretary of State for Defence |
| 054 | The Rt Hon Dame Rosie Winterton | Lab | Doncaster Central | 1 May 1997 | First Deputy Chairmen of Ways and Means. Former Labour Chief Whip. |
| 055 | Clive Efford | Lab | Eltham | 1 May 1997 | |
| 056 | Karen Buck | Lab | Westminster North | 1 May 1997 | |
| 057 | Steve McCabe | Lab | Birmingham Selly Oak | 1 May 1997 | |
| 058 | Graham Stringer | Lab | Blackley and Broughton | 1 May 1997 | |
| 059 | The Rt Hon Sir John Hayes | Con | South Holland and The Deepings | 1 May 1997 | |
| 060 | The Rt Hon Yvette Cooper | Lab | Normanton, Pontefract and Castleford | 1 May 1997 | Shadow Home Secretary. Former Secretary of State for Work and Pensions. |
| 061 | Crispin Blunt | Ind | Reigate | 1 May 1997 | Conservative whip was suspended in October 2023 |
| 062 | Derek Twigg | Lab | Halton | 1 May 1997 | |
| 063 | Dame Siobhain McDonagh | Lab | Mitcham and Morden | 1 May 1997 | |
| 064 | Sir Christopher Chope | Con | Christchurch | 1 May 1997 | Previously served 1983–92 |
| 065 | The Rt Hon Hilary Benn | Lab | Leeds Central | 10 Jun 1999 | Elected at the 1999 Leeds Central by-election. Shadow Secretary of State for Northern Ireland. Former Secretary of State for Environment, Food and Rural Affairs |
| 066 | The Rt Hon David Lammy | Lab | Tottenham | 22 Jun 2000 | Elected at the 2000 Tottenham by-election. Shadow Secretary of State for Foreign, Commonwealth and Development Affairs |
| 067 | Sir Mark Hendrick | Lab | Preston | 23 Nov 2000 | Elected at the 2000 Preston by-election. |
53rd Parliament (elected: 7 June 2001, first met: 13 June 2001, dissolved: 11 April 2005)
| 068 | The Rt Hon Sir Greg Knight | Con | East Yorkshire | 7 Jun 2001 | Previously served 1983–97 |
| 069 | Richard Bacon | Con | South Norfolk | 7 Jun 2001 | |
| 070 | Gregory Campbell | DUP | East Londonderry | 7 Jun 2001 | DUP Spokesperson for the Cabinet Office and International Development |
| 071 | Sir Bill Wiggin | Con | North Herefordshire | 7 Jun 2001 | Chair of the Committee of Selection |
| 072 | Andrew Rosindell | Con | Romford | 7 Jun 2001 | |
| 073 | Kevin Brennan | Lab | Cardiff West | 7 Jun 2001 | |
| 074 | Wayne David | Lab | Caerphilly | 7 Jun 2001 | |
| 075 | The Rt Hon Chris Grayling | Con | Epsom and Ewell | 7 Jun 2001 | Former Secretary of State for Transport and Leader of the House of Commons and Lord President of the Council |
| 076 | Jon Cruddas | Lab | Dagenham and Rainham | 7 Jun 2001 | |
| 077 | The Rt Hon Kevan Jones | Lab | North Durham | 7 Jun 2001 | |
| 078 | The Rt Hon Alistair Carmichael | LD | Orkney and Shetland | 7 Jun 2001 | Liberal Democrat Home Affairs and Northern Ireland Spokesperson. Former Secretary of State for Scotland |
| 079 | John Baron | Con | Basildon and Billericay | 7 Jun 2001 | |
| 080 | The Rt Hon Mark Francois | Con | Rayleigh and Wickford | 7 Jun 2001 | |
| 081 | Andrew Selous | Con | South West Bedfordshire | 7 Jun 2001 | Second Church Estates Commissioner |
| 082 | Khalid Mahmood | Lab | Birmingham Perry Barr | 7 Jun 2001 | Longest serving Asian MP in the House of Commons |
| 083 | Jonathan Djanogly | Con | Huntingdon | 7 Jun 2001 | |
| 084 | The Rt Hon Andrew Murrison | Con | South West Wiltshire | 7 Jun 2001 | |
| 085 | Ian Liddell-Grainger | Con | Bridgwater and West Somerset | 7 Jun 2001 | |
| 086 | The Rt Hon Mark Tami | Lab | Alyn and Deeside | 7 Jun 2001 | |
| 087 | Hywel Williams | PC | Arfon | 7 Jun 2001 | Former Plaid Cymru Westminster Group Leader |
| 088 | Sir Chris Bryant | Lab | Rhondda | 7 Jun 2001 | Former Chair of the Committee on Standards and Committee on Privileges |
| 089 | Pete Wishart | SNP | Perth and North Perthshire | 7 Jun 2001 | Chair of the Scottish Affairs Committee |
| 090 | The Rt Hon Andrew Mitchell | Con | Sutton Coldfield | 7 Jun 2001 | Previously served 1987–97. Deputy Foreign Secretary and Minister of State for Development and Africa. Former Secretary of State for International Development and Government Chief Whip |
| 091 | The Rt Hon Liam Byrne | Lab | Birmingham Hodge Hill | 15 Jul 2004 | Elected at the 2004 Birmingham Hodge Hill by-election. Chair of the Business and Trade Select Committee. Former Chief Secretary to the Treasury |
54th Parliament (elected: 5 May 2005, first met: 11 May 2005, dissolved: 12 April 2010)
| 092 | Sir Charles Walker | Con | Broxbourne | 5 May 2005 | Chair of the Administration Committee |
| 093 | The Rt Hon Tobias Ellwood | Con | Bournemouth East | 5 May 2005 | Former Chair of the Defence Select Committee |
| 094 | Adam Afriyie | Con | Windsor | 5 May 2005 | |
| 095 | Tim Farron | LD | Westmorland and Lonsdale | 5 May 2005 | Liberal Democrat Spokesperson for Environment, Food and Rural Affairs, Communities and Local Government and Housing, Planning, the Northern Powerhouse and Local Growth and former Leader of the Liberal Democrats |
| 096 | The Rt Hon Sir David Evennett | Con | Bexleyheath and Crayford | 5 May 2005 | Previously served 1983–97 |
| 097 | The Rt Hon Stewart Hosie | SNP | Dundee East | 5 May 2005 | |
| 098 | The Rt Hon Grant Shapps | Con | Welwyn Hatfield | 5 May 2005 | Defence Secretary. Former Secretary of State for Energy Security and Net Zero, Business, Energy and Industrial Strategy, and Transport, and home secretary |
| 099 | The Rt Hon Sir Mike Penning | Con | Hemel Hempstead | 5 May 2005 | |
| 100 | Daniel Kawczynski | Con | Shrewsbury and Atcham | 5 May 2005 | |
| 101 | The Rt Hon Sir Jeremy Wright | Con | Kenilworth and Southam | 5 May 2005 | Former Attorney General for England and Wales |
| 102 | Sir James Duddridge | Con | Rochford and Southend East | 5 May 2005 | |
| 103 | The Rt Hon James Brokenshire | Con | Old Bexley and Sidcup | 5 May 2005 | Former Secretary of State for Housing Communities and Local Government, died 7 October 2021 |
| 104 | Philip Hollobone | Con | Kettering | 5 May 2005 | |
| 105 | The Rt Hon Theresa Villiers | Con | Chipping Barnet | 5 May 2005 | Former Secretary of State for Northern Ireland |
| 106 | Peter Bone | Ind | Wellingborough | 5 May 2005 | Conservative Party whip was suspended in October 2023. Removed as MP by recall petition in December 2023. |
| 107 | The Rt Hon Mark Harper | Con | Forest of Dean | 5 May 2005 | Secretary of State for Transport. Former Government Chief Whip |
| 108 | The Rt Hon David Mundell | Con | Dumfriesshire, Clydesdale and Tweeddale | 5 May 2005 | Former Secretary of State for Scotland |
| 109 | John Penrose | Con | Weston-Super-Mare | 5 May 2005 | Former United Kingdom Anti-Corruption Champion |
| 110 | The Rt Hon Mark Pritchard | Con | The Wrekin | 5 May 2005 | |
| 111 | The Rt Hon Dame Maria Miller | Con | Basingstoke | 5 May 2005 | |
| 112 | The Rt Hon Shailesh Vara | Con | North West Cambridgeshire | 5 May 2005 | |
| 113 | The Rt Hon Greg Hands | Con | Chelsea and Fulham | 5 May 2005 | |
| 114 | The Rt Hon Ben Wallace | Con | Wyre and Preston North | 5 May 2005 | Former Secretary of State for Defence |
| 115 | The Rt Hon Jeremy Hunt | Con | South West Surrey | 5 May 2005 | Chancellor of the Exchequer. Former chair of the Health and Social Care Select Committee and Secretary of State for Health and Social Care |
| 116 | The Rt Hon David Davies | Con | Monmouth | 5 May 2005 | Secretary of State for Wales |
| 117 | The Rt Hon David Jones | Con | Clwyd West | 5 May 2005 | Former Secretary of State for Wales |
| 118 | Lyn Brown | Lab | West Ham | 5 May 2005 | |
| 119 | Sir Philip Davies | Con | Shipley | 5 May 2005 | |
| 120 | Stephen Hammond | Con | Wimbledon | 5 May 2005 | |
| 121 | Andrew Gwynne | Lab | Denton and Reddish | 5 May 2005 | Former Shadow Secretary of State for Communities and Local Government |
| 122 | The Rt Hon Stephen Crabb | Con | Preseli Pembrokeshire | 5 May 2005 | Chair of the Welsh Affairs Select Committee and former Secretary of State for Wales |
| 123 | The Rt Hon Pat McFadden | Lab | Wolverhampton South East | 5 May 2005 | Labour Party National Campaign Coordinator and Shadow Chancellor of the Duchy of Lancaster |
| 124 | Dame Meg Hillier | Lab | Hackney South and Shoreditch | 5 May 2005 | Chair of the Public Accounts Select Committee |
| 125 | The Rt Hon Sammy Wilson | DUP | East Antrim | 5 May 2005 | DUP Westminster Chief Whip |
| 126 | The Rt Hon Sir Robert Goodwill | Con | Scarborough and Whitby | 5 May 2005 | Chair of the Environment, Food and Rural Affairs Select Committee |
| 127 | Adam Holloway | Con | Gravesham | 5 May 2005 | |
| 128 | The Rt Hon Greg Clark | Con | Tunbridge Wells | 5 May 2005 | Chair of the Science, Innovation and Technology Select Committee. Former Secretary of State for Levelling Up, Housing and Communities and Secretary of State for Business, Energy and Industrial Strategy |
| 129 | The Rt Hon Michael Gove | Con | Surrey Heath | 5 May 2005 | Secretary of State for Levelling Up, Housing and Communities and Minister for Intergovernmental Relations. Former Chancellor of the Duchy of Lancaster and Secretary of State for Education |
| 130 | Kerry McCarthy | Lab | Bristol East | 5 May 2005 | |
| 131 | Jessica Morden | Lab | Newport East | 5 May 2005 | Chair of the Commons Select Committee on Statutory Instruments and Joint Committee on Statutory Instruments |
| 132 | The Rt Hon Dame Diana Johnson | Lab | Kingston upon Hull North | 5 May 2005 | Chair of the Home Affairs Select Committee |
| 133 | The Rt Hon Graham Stuart | Con | Beverley and Holderness | 5 May 2005 | |
| 134 | The Rt Hon Nadine Dorries | Con | Mid Bedfordshire | 5 May 2005 | Former Secretary of State for Digital, Culture, Media and Sport. Resigned on 29 August 2023, triggering the 2023 Mid Bedfordshire by-election. |
| 135 | The Rt Hon Emily Thornberry | Lab | Islington South and Finsbury | 5 May 2005 | Shadow Attorney General for England and Wales, former Shadow First Secretary of State |
| 136 | Barbara Keeley | Lab | Worsley and Eccles South | 5 May 2005 | |
| 137 | Sharon Hodgson | Lab | Washington and Sunderland West | 5 May 2005 | |
| 138 | The Rt Hon Sir Geoffrey Cox | Con | Torridge and West Devon | 5 May 2005 | Former attorney general |
| 139 | Andy Slaughter | Lab | Hammersmith | 5 May 2005 | |
| 140 | The Rt Hon Ed Miliband | Lab | Doncaster North | 5 May 2005 | Shadow Secretary of State for Energy Security and Net Zero. Former Leader of the Labour Party and Leader of the Opposition |
| 141 | The Rt Hon Philip Dunne | Con | Ludlow | 5 May 2005 | Chair of the Environmental Audit Select Committee |
| 142 | Angus MacNeil | Ind | Na h-Eileanan an Iar | 5 May 2005 | Chair of the Energy Security and Net Zero Select Committee. Expelled from the SNP in August 2023. |
| 143 | Rosie Cooper | Lab | West Lancashire | 5 May 2005 | Resigned on 30 November 2022, triggering the 2023 West Lancashire by-election. |
| 144 | Dame Nia Griffith | Lab | Llanelli | 5 May 2005 | Former Shadow Secretary of State for Defence |
| 145 | Sir Bob Neill | Con | Bromley and Chislehurst | 29 Jun 2006 | Elected at the 2006 Bromley and Chislehurst by-election. Chair of the Justice Select Committee |
| 146 | Virendra Sharma | Lab | Ealing Southall | 19 Jul 2007 | Elected at the 2007 Ealing Southall by-election. |
| 147 | John Howell | Con | Henley | 26 Jun 2008 | Elected at the 2008 Henley by-election. |
| 148 | The Rt Hon Sir David Davis | Con | Haltemprice and Howden | 10 Jul 2008 | Elected at the 2008 Haltemprice and Howden by-election; previously served 1987–2008. |
| 149 | The Rt Hon Chloe Smith | Con | Norwich North | 23 Jul 2009 | Elected at the 2009 Norwich North by-election. Former Secretary of State for Work and Pensions |
55th Parliament (elected: 6 May 2010, first met: 18 May 2010, dissolved: 30 March 2015)
| 150 | The Rt Hon Valerie Vaz | Lab | Walsall South | 6 May 2010 | Former Shadow Leader of the House of Commons |
| 151 | Catherine McKinnell | Lab | Newcastle upon Tyne North | 6 May 2010 | Former Chair of the Petitions Committee |
| 152 | The Rt Hon Bob Stewart | Con | Beckenham | 6 May 2010 | Conservative whip was suspended in November 2023, Whip restored in May 2024 |
| 153 | The Rt Hon Chris Heaton-Harris | Con | Daventry | 6 May 2010 | Secretary of State for Northern Ireland |
| 154 | Iain Stewart | Con | Milton Keynes South | 6 May 2010 | Chair of the Transport Select Committee |
| 155 | Andrew Bridgen | Ind | North West Leicestershire | 6 May 2010 | Elected as Conservative; expelled in April 2023. Joined Reclaim in May 2023. Left Reclaim in December 2023, now an independent |
| 156 | Nigel Mills | Con | Amber Valley | 6 May 2010 | |
| 157 | Neil Parish | Con | Tiverton and Honiton | 6 May 2010 | Former Chair of the Environment, Food and Rural Affairs Select Committee. Resigned on 4 May 2022, triggering the 2022 Tiverton and Honiton by-election |
| 158 | Jack Lopresti | Con | Filton and Bradley Stoke | 6 May 2010 | |
| 159 | Jonathan Reynolds | Lab | Stalybridge and Hyde | 6 May 2010 | Shadow Secretary of State for Business and Trade |
| 160 | The Rt Hon Simon Hart | Con | Carmarthen West and South Pembrokeshire | 6 May 2010 | Government Chief Whip. Former Secretary of State for Wales |
| 161 | Martin Vickers | Con | Cleethorpes | 6 May 2010 | |
| 162 | Geraint Davies | Ind | Swansea West | 6 May 2010 | Previously served 1997–2005. Labour whip was suspended in June 2023. |
| 163 | John Cryer | Lab | Leyton and Wanstead | 6 May 2010 | Previously served 1997–2005. |
| 164 | The Rt Hon Dame Priti Patel | Con | Witham | 6 May 2010 | Former home secretary |
| 165 | The Rt Hon Sir Alec Shelbrooke | Con | Elmet and Rothwell | 6 May 2010 | |
| 166 | The Rt Hon Nigel Adams | Con | Selby and Ainsty | 6 May 2010 | Resigned on 12 June 2023, triggering the 2023 Selby and Ainsty by-election |
| 167 | The Rt Hon Mel Stride | Con | Central Devon | 6 May 2010 | Secretary of State for Work and Pensions. Former chair of the Treasury Select Committee, Leader of the House of Commons and Lord President of the Council |
| 168 | The Rt Hon Damian Hinds | Con | East Hampshire | 6 May 2010 | |
| 169 | The Rt Hon Sir Mark Spencer | Con | Sherwood | 6 May 2010 | Former Leader of the House of Commons and Lord President of the Council |
| 170 | Ian Lavery | Lab | Wansbeck | 6 May 2010 | |
| 171 | Grahame Morris | Lab | Easington | 6 May 2010 | |
| 172 | Ian Mearns | Lab | Gateshead | 6 May 2010 | Chair of the Backbench Business Committee |
| 173 | The Rt Hon Sir Sajid Javid | Con | Bromsgrove | 6 May 2010 | Former Secretary of State for Health and Social Care, Home Secretary and Chancellor of the Exchequer |
| 174 | The Rt Hon Robert Halfon | Con | Harlow | 6 May 2010 | Former chair of the Education Select Committee |
| 175 | The Rt Hon John Glen | Con | Salisbury | 6 May 2010 | Minister for the Cabinet Office and Paymaster General |
| 176 | The Rt Hon Jesse Norman | Con | Hereford and South Herefordshire | 6 May 2010 | |
| 177 | David Morris | Con | Morecambe and Lunesdale | 6 May 2010 | |
| 178 | Richard Drax | Con | South Dorset | 6 May 2010 | |
| 179 | Bob Blackman | Con | Harrow East | 6 May 2010 | |
| 180 | Fiona Bruce | Con | Congleton | 6 May 2010 | |
| 181 | Dan Poulter | Lab | Central Suffolk and North Ipswich | 6 May 2010 | Elected as Conservative, defected to Labour in April 2024 |
| 182 | Dame Tracey Crouch | Con | Chatham and Aylesford | 6 May 2010 | |
| 183 | Mary Glindon | Lab | North Tyneside | 6 May 2010 | |
| 184 | Julie Elliott | Lab | Sunderland Central | 6 May 2010 | |
| 185 | Heather Wheeler | Con | South Derbyshire | 6 May 2010 | |
| 186 | Peter Aldous | Con | Waveney | 6 May 2010 | |
| 187 | James Morris | Con | Halesowen and Rowley Regis | 6 May 2010 | |
| 188 | Mark Garnier | Con | Wyre Forest | 6 May 2010 | Chair of the Arms Export Controls Committee |
| 189 | Pauline Latham | Con | Mid Derbyshire | 6 May 2010 | |
| 190 | Andrew Percy | Con | Brigg and Goole | 6 May 2010 | |
| 191 | The Rt Hon Dominic Raab | Con | Esher and Walton | 6 May 2010 | Former deputy prime minister, Justice Secretary, Lord High Chancellor of Great Britain and Foreign Secretary |
| 192 | Damian Collins | Con | Folkestone and Hythe | 6 May 2010 | |
| 193 | The Rt Hon Caroline Nokes | Con | Romsey and Southampton North | 6 May 2010 | Chair of the Women and Equalities Committee |
| 194 | The Rt Hon The Lady Lancaster of Kimbolton (Dame Caroline Dinenage) | Con | Gosport | 6 May 2010 | Chair of the Culture, Media and Sport Select Committee |
| 195 | The Rt Hon Sir Conor Burns | Con | Bournemouth West | 6 May 2010 | |
| 196 | Mark Menzies | Ind | Fylde | 6 May 2010 | Conservative whip was suspended in April 2024. |
| 197 | Toby Perkins | Lab | Chesterfield | 6 May 2010 | |
| 198 | Bill Esterson | Lab | Sefton Central | 6 May 2010 | |
| 199 | Yasmin Qureshi | Lab | Bolton South East | 6 May 2010 | |
| 200 | The Hon Ian Paisley Jr | DUP | North Antrim | 6 May 2010 | DUP Spokesperson for Culture, Media and Sport and Communities and Local Government |
| 201 | Kate Green | Lab | Stretford and Urmston | 6 May 2010 | Former Shadow Secretary of State for Education; Resigned on 10 November 2022, triggering the 2022 Stretford and Urmston by-election |
| 202 | The Rt Hon Rachel Reeves | Lab | Leeds West | 6 May 2010 | Shadow Chancellor of the Exchequer |
| 203 | Jonathan Lord | Con | Woking | 6 May 2010 | |
| 204 | The Rt Hon Julian Smith | Con | Skipton and Ripon | 6 May 2010 | Former Secretary of State for Northern Ireland |
| 205 | Lilian Greenwood | Lab | Nottingham South | 6 May 2010 | |
| 206 | Chris Evans | Lab | Islwyn | 6 May 2010 | |
| 207 | Julian Sturdy | Con | York Outer | 6 May 2010 | |
| 208 | The Rt Hon Craig Whittaker | Con | Calder Valley | 6 May 2010 | |
| 209 | The Rt Hon Dr Thérèse Coffey | Con | Suffolk Coastal | 6 May 2010 | Former deputy prime minister, Secretary of State for Environment, Food and Rural Affairs, Secretary of State for Health and Social Care and Secretary of State for Work and Pensions |
| 210 | The Rt Hon Chris Skidmore | Ind | Kingswood | 6 May 2010 | Resigned on 8 January 2024, triggering the 2024 Kingswood by-election |
| 211 | Jonathan Edwards | Ind | Carmarthen East and Dinefwr | 6 May 2010 | Former Plaid Cymru Parliamentary group leader. Plaid Cymru whip was suspended in July 2020. |
| 212 | The Rt Hon Christopher Pincher | Ind | Tamworth | 6 May 2010 | Conservative whip was suspended in July 2022. Resigned on 7 September 2023, triggering the 2023 Tamworth by-election |
| 213 | George Freeman | Con | Mid Norfolk | 6 May 2010 | |
| 214 | Bridget Phillipson | Lab | Houghton and Sunderland South | 6 May 2010 | Shadow Secretary of State for Education |
| 215 | Nick Smith | Lab | Blaenau Gwent | 6 May 2010 | |
| 216 | David Rutley | Con | Macclesfield | 6 May 2010 | |
| 217 | Karl Turner | Lab | Kingston upon Hull East | 6 May 2010 | |
| 218 | The Rt Hon Penny Mordaunt | Con | Portsmouth North | 6 May 2010 | Leader of the House of Commons and Lord President of the Council. Former Defence Secretary |
| 219 | Alex Cunningham | Lab | Stockton North | 6 May 2010 | |
| 220 | Chi Onwurah | Lab | Newcastle upon Tyne Central | 6 May 2010 | |
| 221 | Yvonne Fovargue | Lab | Makerfield | 6 May 2010 | |
| 222 | Liz Kendall | Lab | Leicester West | 6 May 2010 | Shadow Secretary of State for Work and Pensions |
| 223 | Anne Marie Morris | Con | Newton Abbot | 6 May 2010 | |
| 224 | Henry Smith | Con | Crawley | 6 May 2010 | |
| 225 | The Rt Hon Elizabeth Truss | Con | South West Norfolk | 6 May 2010 | Former Leader of the Conservative Party, Prime Minister, Secretary of State for Foreign, Commonwealth and Development Affairs and Secretary of State for International Trade |
| 226 | Guy Opperman | Con | Hexham | 6 May 2010 | |
| 227 | Sheryll Murray | Con | South East Cornwall | 6 May 2010 | |
| 228 | Helen Grant | Con | Maidstone and The Weald | 6 May 2010 | |
| 229 | The Rt Hon Dame Andrea Leadsom | Con | South Northamptonshire | 6 May 2010 | Former Leader of the House of Commons and Lord President of the Council |
| 230 | Richard Graham | Con | Gloucester | 6 May 2010 | |
| 231 | The Rt Hon Sir Alok Sharma | Con | Reading West | 6 May 2010 | Former president of COP26 |
| 232 | Gareth Johnson | Con | Dartford | 6 May 2010 | |
| 233 | The Rt Hon Marcus Jones | Con | Nuneaton | 6 May 2010 | |
| 234 | The Rt Hon Andrew Stephenson | Con | Pendle | 6 May 2010 | |
| 235 | Steve Brine | Con | Winchester | 6 May 2010 | Chair of the Health and Social Care Select Committee |
| 236 | The Rt Hon Sir Brandon Lewis | Con | Great Yarmouth | 6 May 2010 | Former Secretary of State for Justice, Lord High Chancellor of Great Britain and Secretary of State for Northern Ireland |
| 237 | Dame Jackie Doyle-Price | Con | Thurrock | 6 May 2010 | Chair of the Public Administration and Constitutional Affairs Select Committee |
| 238 | Mike Freer | Con | Finchley and Golders Green | 6 May 2010 | |
| 239 | Stephen Metcalfe | Con | South Basildon and East Thurrock | 6 May 2010 | |
| 240 | The Rt Hon Stephen McPartland | Con | Stevenage | 6 May 2010 | Chair of the Regulatory Reform Committee |
| 241 | Gordon Henderson | Con | Sittingbourne and Sheppey | 6 May 2010 | |
| 242 | The Rt Hon Alun Cairns | Con | Vale of Glamorgan | 6 May 2010 | Former Secretary of State for Wales |
| 243 | Dame Harriett Baldwin | Con | West Worcestershire | 6 May 2010 | Chair of the Treasury Select Committee |
| 244 | The Rt Hon Steve Barclay | Con | North East Cambridgeshire | 6 May 2010 | Secretary of State for Environment, Food and Rural Affairs. Former Secretary of State for Health and Social Care, Chancellor of the Duchy of Lancaster and Minister for the Cabinet Office |
| 245 | The Rt Hon Sir Gavin Williamson | Con | South Staffordshire | 6 May 2010 | Former Secretary of State for Education |
| 246 | The Hon Robin Walker | Con | Worcester | 6 May 2010 | Chair of the Education Select Committee |
| 247 | The Rt Hon Sir Michael Ellis | Con | Northampton North | 6 May 2010 | Former Attorney General for England and Wales |
| 248 | The Rt Hon Nadhim Zahawi | Con | Stratford-on-Avon | 6 May 2010 | Former Chairman of the Conservative Party and Minister without Portfolio, Chancellor of the Exchequer, Chancellor of the Duchy of Lancaster, Minister for Equalities and Education Secretary |
| 249 | The Rt Hon George Eustice | Con | Camborne and Redruth | 6 May 2010 | Former Secretary of State for Environment, Food and Rural Affairs |
| 250 | The Rt Hon Sir Robert Buckland | Con | South Swindon | 6 May 2010 | Chair of the Northern Ireland Affairs Select Committee. Former Secretary of State for Wales, Secretary of State for Justice and Lord High Chancellor of Great Britain |
| 251 | Justin Tomlinson | Con | North Swindon | 6 May 2010 | |
| 252 | Rehman Chishti | Con | Gillingham and Rainham | 6 May 2010 | |
| 253 | Paul Maynard | Con | Blackpool North and Cleveleys | 6 May 2010 | |
| 254 | Andrew Jones | Con | Harrogate and Knaresborough | 6 May 2010 | |
| 255 | Lisa Nandy | Lab | Wigan | 6 May 2010 | Shadow Cabinet Minister for International Development. Former Shadow Secretary of State for Levelling Up, Housing and Communities and Shadow Foreign Secretary |
| 256 | Paul Blomfield | Lab | Sheffield Central | 6 May 2010 | |
| 257 | The Rt Hon Matt Hancock | Con | West Suffolk | 6 May 2010 | Conservative whip was suspended in November 2022. Former Secretary of State for Health and Social Care Whip restored in May 2024 |
| 258 | The Rt Hon Stuart Andrew | Con | Pudsey | 6 May 2010 | |
| 259 | Ian Murray | Lab | Edinburgh South | 6 May 2010 | Shadow Secretary of State for Scotland |
| 260 | Rebecca Harris | Con | Castle Point | 6 May 2010 | |
| 261 | Caroline Lucas | GPEW | Brighton Pavilion | 6 May 2010 | Former Leader of the Green Party of England and Wales |
| 262 | Matthew Offord | Con | Hendon | 6 May 2010 | |
| 263 | The Rt Hon Sir Jake Berry | Con | Rossendale and Darwen | 6 May 2010 | Former Chairman of the Conservative Party and Minister without Portfolio |
| 264 | Jack Dromey | Lab | Birmingham Erdington | 6 May 2010 | Died 7 January 2022 |
| 265 | John Stevenson | Con | Carlisle | 6 May 2010 | |
| 266 | The Rt Hon Sir Jacob Rees-Mogg | Con | North East Somerset | 6 May 2010 | Former Secretary of State for Business, Energy and Industrial Strategy, Leader of the House of Commons and Lord President of the Council |
| 267 | Rushanara Ali | Lab | Bethnal Green and Bow | 6 May 2010 | |
| 268 | Shabana Mahmood | Lab | Birmingham Ladywood | 6 May 2010 | Shadow Secretary of State for Justice and Shadow Lord Chancellor |
| 269 | The Rt Hon Dr Kwasi Kwarteng | Con | Spelthorne | 6 May 2010 | Former chancellor of the exchequer and Secretary of State for Business, Energy and Industrial Strategy |
| 270 | Mark Pawsey | Con | Rugby | 6 May 2010 | |
| 271 | The Rt Hon Steve Baker | Con | Wycombe | 6 May 2010 | |
| 272 | Jim Shannon | DUP | Strangford | 6 May 2010 | DUP Spokesperson for Health and Social Care and Human Rights |
| 273 | The Rt Hon Dame Karen Bradley | Con | Staffordshire Moorlands | 6 May 2010 | Chair of the Procedure Committee. Former Secretary of State for Northern Ireland |
| 274 | Stella Creasy | Lab | Walthamstow | 6 May 2010 | |
| 275 | Alison McGovern | Lab | Wirral South | 6 May 2010 | |
| 276 | Debbie Abrahams | Lab | Oldham East and Saddleworth | 13 Jan 2011 | Elected at the 2011 Oldham East and Saddleworth by-election. Former Shadow Secretary of State for Work and Pensions |
| 277 | Dan Jarvis | Lab | Barnsley Central | 3 Mar 2011 | Elected at the 2011 Barnsley Central by-election. Former Mayor of South Yorkshire |
| 278 | The Rt Hon Jonathan Ashworth | Lab | Leicester South | 5 May 2011 | Elected at the 2011 Leicester South by-election. Shadow Paymaster General |
| 279 | Seema Malhotra | Lab | Feltham and Heston | 15 Dec 2011 | Elected at the 2011 Feltham and Heston by-election. |
| 280 | Stephen Doughty | Lab | Cardiff South and Penarth | 15 Nov 2012 | Elected at the 2012 Cardiff South and Penarth by-election. |
| 281 | Lucy Powell | Lab | Manchester Central | 15 Nov 2012 | Elected at the 2012 Manchester Central by-election. Shadow Leader of the House of Commons |
| 282 | Sarah Champion | Lab | Rotherham | 29 Nov 2012 | Elected at the 2012 Rotherham by-election. Chair of the International Development Select Committee |
| 283 | Andy McDonald | Lab | Middlesbrough | 29 Nov 2012 | Elected at the 2012 Middlesbrough by-election. Former Shadow Secretary of State for Employment Rights and Protections |
| 284 | Steve Reed | Lab | Croydon North | 29 Nov 2012 | Elected at the 2012 Croydon North by-election. Shadow Secretary of State for Environment, Food and Rural Affairs |
| 285 | Emma Lewell-Buck | Lab | South Shields | 2 May 2013 | Elected at the 2013 South Shields by-election. |
| 286 | Mike Kane | Lab | Wythenshawe and Sale East | 13 Feb 2014 | Elected at the 2014 Wythenshawe and Sale East by-election. |
| 287 | The Rt Hon Robert Jenrick | Con | Newark | 5 Jun 2014 | Elected at the 2014 Newark by-election. Former Secretary of State for Housing, Communities and Local Government |
56th Parliament (elected: 7 May 2015, first met: 18 May 2015, dissolved: 3 May 2017)
| 288 | Simon Hoare | Con | North Dorset | 7 May 2015 | |
| 289 | Kevin Hollinrake | Con | Thirsk and Malton | 7 May 2015 | |
| 290 | The Rt Hon Ranil Jayawardena | Con | North East Hampshire | 7 May 2015 | Former Secretary of State for Environment, Food and Rural Affairs |
| 291 | Alan Mak | Con | Havant | 7 May 2015 | |
| 292 | The Rt Hon Tom Tugendhat | Con | Tonbridge and Malling | 7 May 2015 | Minister of State for Security. Former chair of the Foreign Affairs Select Committee |
| 293 | The Rt Hon Chris Philp | Con | Croydon South | 7 May 2015 | Former Chief Secretary to the Treasury |
| 294 | Judith Cummins | Lab | Bradford South | 7 May 2015 | |
| 295 | The Rt Hon Liz Saville Roberts | PC | Dwyfor Meirionnydd | 7 May 2015 | Plaid Cymru Westminster Group Leader |
| 296 | Kevin Foster | Con | Torbay | 7 May 2015 | |
| 297 | Conor McGinn | Ind | St Helens North | 7 May 2015 | Labour Party whip suspended in December 2022. |
| 298 | Kate Hollern | Lab | Blackburn | 7 May 2015 | |
| 299 | Peter Dowd | Lab | Bootle | 7 May 2015 | |
| 300 | Tom Pursglove | Con | Corby | 7 May 2015 | |
| 301 | Nus Ghani | Con | Wealden | 7 May 2015 | |
| 302 | The Rt Hon Johnny Mercer | Con | Plymouth Moor View | 7 May 2015 | Minister of State for Veterans' Affairs |
| 303 | The Rt Hon Anne-Marie Trevelyan | Con | Berwick-upon-Tweed | 7 May 2015 | Former Secretary of State for Transport, Secretary of State for International Trade and President of the Board of Trade |
| 304 | Rebecca Pow | Con | Taunton Deane | 7 May 2015 | |
| 305 | Michael Tomlinson-Mynors | Con | Mid Dorset and North Poole | 7 May 2015 | Minister of State for Countering Illegal Migration |
| 306 | Steve Double | Con | St Austell and Newquay | 7 May 2015 | |
| 307 | Mims Davies | Con | Mid Sussex | 7 May 2015 | |
| 308 | Marcus Fysh | Con | Yeovil | 7 May 2015 | |
| 309 | The Rt Hon James Heappey | Con | Wells | 7 May 2015 | |
| 310 | The Rt Hon Angela Rayner | Lab | Ashton-under-Lyne | 7 May 2015 | Shadow First Secretary of State, Deputy Leader of the Opposition, Deputy Leader of the Labour Party, Shadow Deputy Prime Minister and Shadow Secretary of State for Levelling Up, Housing and Communities |
| 311 | Matthew Pennycook | Lab | Greenwich and Woolwich | 7 May 2015 | |
| 312 | Rupa Huq | Lab | Ealing Central and Acton | 7 May 2015 | |
| 313 | Maggie Throup | Con | Erewash | 7 May 2015 | |
| 314 | Alberto Costa | Con | South Leicestershire | 7 May 2015 | |
| 315 | Chris Matheson | Lab | City of Chester | 7 May 2015 | Resigned on 21 October 2022, triggering the 2022 City of Chester by-election |
| 316 | Royston Smith | Con | Southampton Itchen | 7 May 2015 | |
| 317 | The Rt Hon Suella Braverman | Con | Fareham | 7 May 2015 | Former home secretary and Attorney General for England and Wales |
| 318 | The Rt Hon Edward Argar | Con | Charnwood | 7 May 2015 | Former Chief Secretary to the Treasury |
| 319 | Matt Warman | Con | Boston and Skegness | 7 May 2015 | |
| 320 | Nigel Huddleston | Con | Mid Worcestershire | 7 May 2015 | |
| 321 | Mike Wood | Con | Dudley South | 7 May 2015 | |
| 322 | Dawn Butler | Lab | Brent Central | 7 May 2015 | Former Shadow Secretary of State for Women and Equalities. Previously served 2005–10 |
| 323 | Catherine West | Lab | Hornsey and Wood Green | 7 May 2015 | |
| 324 | The Rt Hon Ian Blackford | SNP | Ross, Skye and Lochaber | 7 May 2015 | Former SNP Westminster Group Leader |
| 325 | Angela Crawley | SNP | Lanark and Hamilton East | 7 May 2015 | |
| 326 | Mhairi Black | SNP | Paisley and Renfrewshire South | 7 May 2015 | SNP Westminster Group Deputy Leader |
| 327 | Neil Gray | SNP | Airdrie and Shotts | 7 May 2015 | Resigned on 24 March 2021, triggering the 2021 Airdrie and Shotts by-election |
| 328 | Philippa Whitford | SNP | Central Ayrshire | 7 May 2015 | |
| 329 | Joanna Cherry | SNP | Edinburgh South West | 7 May 2015 | Former SNP Spokesperson on Home Affairs |
| 330 | Lisa Cameron | Con | East Kilbride, Strathaven and Lesmahagow | 7 May 2015 | Elected as SNP, defected to the Conservatives in October 2023 |
| 331 | John McNally | SNP | Falkirk | 7 May 2015 | |
| 332 | Hannah Bardell | SNP | Livingston | 7 May 2015 | |
| 333 | Stewart McDonald | SNP | Glasgow South | 7 May 2015 | |
| 334 | Martyn Day | SNP | Linlithgow and East Falkirk | 7 May 2015 | |
| 335 | The Hon Kate Osamor | Lab | Edmonton | 7 May 2015 | Former Shadow Secretary of State for International Development. Labour Party whip was suspended in January 2024 and restored in May 2024. |
| 336 | Naz Shah | Lab | Bradford West | 7 May 2015 | |
| 337 | The Rt Hon Nick Thomas-Symonds | Lab | Torfaen | 7 May 2015 | Shadow Minister without Portfolio. Former Shadow Home Secretary, Shadow Secretary of State for International Trade and Shadow President of the Board of Trade. |
| 338 | Drew Hendry | SNP | Inverness, Nairn, Badenoch and Strathspey | 7 May 2015 | SNP Spokesperson for the Treasury |
| 339 | Carol Monaghan | SNP | Glasgow North West | 7 May 2015 | SNP Spokesperson for Education, Science, Innovation and Technology |
| 340 | Alan Brown | SNP | Kilmarnock and Loudoun | 7 May 2015 | |
| 341 | Ronnie Cowan | SNP | Inverclyde | 7 May 2015 | |
| 342 | Patricia Gibson | SNP | North Ayrshire and Arran | 7 May 2015 | SNP Shadow Attorney General |
| 343 | Helen Hayes | Lab | Dulwich and West Norwood | 7 May 2015 | |
| 344 | Vicky Foxcroft | Lab | Lewisham Deptford | 7 May 2015 | |
| 345 | Brendan O'Hara | SNP | Argyll and Bute | 7 May 2015 | |
| 346 | Marion Fellows | SNP | Motherwell and Wishaw | 7 May 2015 | |
| 347 | Marie Rimmer | Lab | St Helens South and Whiston | 7 May 2015 | |
| 348 | Thangam Debbonaire | Lab | Bristol West | 7 May 2015 | Shadow Secretary of State for Culture, Media and Sport |
| 349 | Holly Lynch | Lab | Halifax | 7 May 2015 | |
| 350 | Patrick Grady | SNP | Glasgow North | 7 May 2015 | |
| 351 | Kirsty Blackman | SNP | Aberdeen North | 7 May 2015 | SNP Spokesperson for the Cabinet Office |
| 352 | Jess Phillips | Lab | Birmingham Yardley | 7 May 2015 | |
| 353 | Justin Madders | Lab | Ellesmere Port and Neston | 7 May 2015 | |
| 354 | Chris Law | SNP | Dundee West | 7 May 2015 | |
| 355 | Chris Stephens | SNP | Glasgow South West | 7 May 2015 | SNP Spokesperson for Justice and Immigration |
| 356 | The Rt Hon Victoria Prentis | Con | Banbury | 7 May 2015 | Attorney General for England and Wales |
| 357 | Colleen Fletcher | Lab | Coventry North East | 7 May 2015 | |
| 358 | Cat Smith | Lab | Lancaster and Fleetwood | 7 May 2015 | Former Shadow Secretary of State for Young People and Democracy |
| 359 | Deidre Brock | SNP | Edinburgh North and Leith | 7 May 2015 | SNP Spokesperson for House of Commons Business |
| 360 | Rebecca Long-Bailey | Lab | Salford and Eccles | 7 May 2015 | Former Shadow Secretary of State for Education |
| 361 | Maria Caulfield | Con | Lewes | 7 May 2015 | |
| 362 | Stuart McDonald | SNP | Cumbernauld, Kilsyth and Kirkintilloch East | 7 May 2015 | |
| 363 | Richard Burgon | Lab | Leeds East | 7 May 2015 | Former Shadow Secretary of State for Justice and Shadow Lord Chancellor |
| 364 | Imran Hussain | Lab | Bradford East | 7 May 2015 | |
| 365 | Alison Thewliss | SNP | Glasgow Central | 7 May 2015 | SNP Spokesperson for Home Affairs |
| 366 | Daniel Zeichner | Lab | Cambridge | 7 May 2015 | |
| 367 | Douglas Chapman | SNP | Dunfermline and West Fife | 7 May 2015 | |
| 368 | Tommy Sheppard | SNP | Edinburgh East | 7 May 2015 | SNP Spokesperson for Scotland |
| 369 | Rachael Maskell | Lab | York Central | 7 May 2015 | |
| 370 | Louise Haigh | Lab | Sheffield Heeley | 7 May 2015 | Shadow Secretary of State for Transport |
| 371 | Lucy Allan | Ind | Telford | 7 May 2015 | Whip removed 28 May 2024 |
| 372 | Jo Stevens | Lab | Cardiff Central | 7 May 2015 | Shadow Secretary of State for Wales |
| 373 | The Rt Hon Lucy Frazer | Con | South East Cambridgeshire | 7 May 2015 | Secretary of State for Culture, Media and Sport |
| 374 | The Rt Hon Victoria Atkins | Con | Louth and Horncastle | 7 May 2015 | Secretary of State for Health and Social Care |
| 375 | Karin Smyth | Lab | Bristol South | 7 May 2015 | |
| 376 | Paul Scully | Con | Sutton and Cheam | 7 May 2015 | |
| 377 | Clive Lewis | Lab | Norwich South | 7 May 2015 | |
| 378 | The Rt Hon Wendy Morton | Con | Aldridge-Brownhills | 7 May 2015 | Former Government Chief Whip |
| 379 | Gerald Jones | Lab | Merthyr Tydfil and Rhymney | 7 May 2015 | |
| 380 | The Rt Hon Kit Malthouse | Con | North West Hampshire | 7 May 2015 | Former Secretary of State for Education and Chancellor of the Duchy of Lancaster |
| 381 | Margaret Greenwood | Lab | Wirral West | 7 May 2015 | |
| 382 | Luke Hall | Con | Thornbury and Yate | 7 May 2015 | |
| 383 | Scott Mann | Con | North Cornwall | 7 May 2015 | |
| 384 | Julian Knight | Ind | Solihull | 7 May 2015 | Former Chair of the Digital, Culture, Media and Sport Select Committee. Conservative Party whip suspended in December 2022. |
| 385 | Craig Tracey | Con | North Warwickshire | 7 May 2015 | |
| 386 | The Rt Hon Dame Amanda Milling | Con | Cannock Chase | 7 May 2015 | |
| 387 | Dame Andrea Jenkyns | Con | Morley and Outwood | 7 May 2015 | |
| 388 | Chris Green | Con | Bolton West | 7 May 2015 | |
| 389 | Jo Churchill | Con | Bury St Edmunds | 7 May 2015 | |
| 390 | James Cartlidge | Con | South Suffolk | 7 May 2015 | |
| 391 | The Rt Hon Oliver Dowden | Con | Hertsmere | 7 May 2015 | Deputy Prime Minister, Secretary of State in the Cabinet Office and Chancellor of the Duchy of Lancaster. Former Chairman of the Conservative Party |
| 392 | Huw Merriman | Con | Bexhill and Battle | 7 May 2015 | Former chair of the Transport Select Committee |
| 393 | Helen Whately | Con | Faversham and Mid Kent | 7 May 2015 | |
| 394 | Tulip Siddiq | Lab | Hampstead and Kilburn | 7 May 2015 | |
| 395 | Jeff Smith | Lab | Manchester Withington | 7 May 2015 | |
| 396 | The Rt Hon Sir Keir Starmer | Lab | Holborn and St Pancras | 7 May 2015 | Leader of the Labour Party and Leader of the Opposition |
| 397 | The Rt Hon James Cleverly | Con | Braintree | 7 May 2015 | Home Secretary. Former Secretary of State for Foreign, Commonwealth and Development Affairs and Secretary of State for Education |
| 398 | Will Quince | Con | Colchester | 7 May 2015 | |
| 399 | Ruth Cadbury | Lab | Brentford and Isleworth | 7 May 2015 | |
| 400 | Carolyn Harris | Lab | Swansea East | 7 May 2015 | |
| 401 | Christina Rees | Lab | Neath | 7 May 2015 | Former Shadow Secretary of State for Wales. Labour Party whip suspended in October 2022 and restored in February 2024. |
| 402 | Mary Robinson | Con | Cheadle | 7 May 2015 | |
| 403 | The Rt Hon Alex Chalk | Con | Cheltenham | 7 May 2015 | Justice Secretary and Lord High Chancellor of Great Britain |
| 404 | Wes Streeting | Lab | Ilford North | 7 May 2015 | Shadow Secretary of State for Health and Social Care |
| 405 | Peter Kyle | Lab | Hove | 7 May 2015 | Shadow Secretary of State for Science, Innovation and Technology |
| 406 | The Rt Hon Rishi Sunak | Con | Richmond (Yorks) | 7 May 2015 | Leader of the Conservative Party and prime minister. Former chancellor of the exchequer |
| 407 | The Rt Hon Kelly Tolhurst | Con | Rochester and Strood | 7 May 2015 | |
| 408 | Craig Mackinlay | Con | South Thanet | 7 May 2015 | |
| 409 | The Hon Stephen Kinnock | Lab | Aberavon | 7 May 2015 | |
| 410 | Martin Docherty-Hughes | SNP | West Dunbartonshire | 7 May 2015 | SNP Spokesperson for Defence |
| 411 | The Rt Hon Sir Jeremy Quin | Con | Horsham | 7 May 2015 | Chair of the Defence Select Committee. Former Minister for the Cabinet Office and Paymaster General |
| 412 | Neil Coyle | Lab | Bermondsey and Old Southwark | 7 May 2015 | |
| 413 | William Wragg | Ind | Hazel Grove | 7 May 2015 | Former chair of the Public Administration and Constitutional Affairs Select Committee. Resigned the Conservative Party whip in April 2024. |
| 414 | Peter Grant | SNP | Glenrothes | 7 May 2015 | |
| 415 | The Rt Hon Michelle Donelan | Con | Chippenham | 7 May 2015 | Secretary of State for Science, Innovation and Technology. Former Secretary of State for Digital, Culture, Media and Sport and Secretary of State for Education |
| 416 | Gavin Newlands | SNP | Paisley and Renfrewshire North | 7 May 2015 | SNP Spokesperson for Transport |
| 417 | Derek Thomas | Con | St Ives | 7 May 2015 | |
| 418 | David Warburton | Ind | Somerton and Frome | 7 May 2015 | Conservative whip was suspended in April 2022. Resigned on 19 June 2023, triggering 2023 Somerton and Frome by-election |
| 419 | The Rt Hon Gavin Robinson | DUP | Belfast East | 7 May 2015 | Leader of the Democratic Unionist Party (DUP) |
| 420 | The Rt Hon Boris Johnson | Con | Uxbridge and South Ruislip | 7 May 2015 | Former Leader of the Conservative Party, Prime Minister, Mayor of London, and Secretary of State for Foreign and Commonwealth Affairs. Previously served 2001–2008. Resigned on 12 June 2023, triggering 2023 Uxbridge and South Ruislip by-election |
| 421 | Jim McMahon | Lab | Oldham West and Royton | 3 Dec 2015 | Elected at the 2015 Oldham West and Royton by-election. Chair of the Co-operative Party |
| 422 | Gill Furniss | Lab | Sheffield Brightside and Hillsborough | 5 May 2016 | Elected at the 2016 Sheffield Brightside and Hillsborough by-election. |
| 423 | Christopher Elmore | Lab | Ogmore | 5 May 2016 | Elected at the 2016 Ogmore by-election. |
| 424 | Rosena Allin-Khan | Lab | Tooting | 16 Jun 2016 | Elected at the 2016 Tooting by-election. |
| 425 | Tracy Brabin | Lab | Batley and Spen | 20 Oct 2016 | Elected at the 2016 Batley and Spen by-election. Resigned on 10 May 2021 following election as Mayor of West Yorkshire. |
| 426 | Robert Courts | Con | Witney | 20 Oct 2016 | Elected at the 2016 Witney by-election. |
| 427 | Caroline Johnson | Con | Sleaford and North Hykeham | 8 Dec 2016 | Elected at the 2016 Sleaford and North Hykeham by-election |
| 428 | Trudy Harrison | Con | Copeland | 23 Feb 2017 | Elected at the 2017 Copeland by-election. |
57th Parliament (elected: 8 June 2017, first met: 13 June 2017, dissolved: 6 November 2019)
| 429 | The Rt Hon Sir Ed Davey | LD | Kingston and Surbiton | 8 Jun 2017 | Leader of the Liberal Democrats. Former Secretary of State for Energy and Climate Change. Previously served 1997–2015. |
| 430 | Sir Tony Lloyd | Lab | Rochdale | 8 Jun 2017 | Former Shadow Secretary of State for Scotland and Shadow Secretary of State for Northern Ireland. Previously served 1983–2012. Died 17 January 2024. |
| 431 | The Rt Hon Esther McVey | Con | Tatton | 8 Jun 2017 | Minister of State without Portfolio. Former Secretary of State for Work and Pensions. Previously served 2010–15. |
| 432 | Tan Dhesi | Lab | Slough | 8 Jun 2017 | |
| 433 | Afzal Khan | Lab | Manchester Gorton | 8 Jun 2017 | |
| 434 | Luke Pollard | Lab | Plymouth Sutton and Devonport | 8 Jun 2017 | Former Shadow Secretary of State for Environment, Food and Rural Affairs |
| 435 | Alex Norris | Lab | Nottingham North | 8 Jun 2017 | |
| 436 | The Rt Hon Alister Jack | Con | Dumfries and Galloway | 8 Jun 2017 | Secretary of State for Scotland |
| 437 | Andrew Bowie | Con | West Aberdeenshire and Kincardine | 8 Jun 2017 | |
| 438 | Marsha de Cordova | Lab | Battersea | 8 Jun 2017 | Former Shadow Secretary of State for Women and Equalities |
| 439 | Matt Western | Lab | Warwick and Leamington | 8 Jun 2017 | |
| 440 | Wera Hobhouse | LD | Bath | 8 Jun 2017 | Liberal Democrat Spokesperson for Justice, Women and Equalities and Liberal Democrat Manager of Commons Business |
| 441 | Tonia Antoniazzi | Lab | Gower | 8 Jun 2017 | |
| 442 | Jamie Stone | LD | Caithness, Sutherland and Easter Ross | 8 Jun 2017 | Liberal Democrat Spokesperson for Defence |
| 443 | Mike Amesbury | Lab | Weaver Vale | 8 Jun 2017 | |
| 444 | Christine Jardine | LD | Edinburgh West | 8 Jun 2017 | Liberal Democrat Spokesperson for the Treasury, Europe and Exiting the European Union, and International Trade |
| 445 | David Linden | SNP | Glasgow East | 8 Jun 2017 | SNP Spokesperson for Social Justice |
| 446 | Ben Lake | PC | Ceredigion | 8 Jun 2017 | |
| 447 | Anneliese Dodds | Lab | Oxford East | 8 Jun 2017 | Chair of the Labour Party and Shadow Secretary of State for Women and Equalities. Former Shadow Chancellor of the Exchequer |
| 448 | Mohammad Yasin | Lab | Bedford | 8 Jun 2017 | |
| 449 | Alex Sobel | Lab | Leeds North West | 8 Jun 2017 | |
| 450 | Emma Hardy | Lab | Kingston upon Hull West and Hessle | 8 Jun 2017 | |
| 451 | Paul Girvan | DUP | South Antrim | 8 Jun 2017 | DUP Spokesperson on Education and Transportation |
| 452 | Darren Jones | Lab | Bristol North West | 8 Jun 2017 | Shadow Chief Secretary to the Treasury. Former Chair of the Business and Trade Select Committee |
| 453 | Mike Hill | Lab | Hartlepool | 8 Jun 2017 | Resigned on 16 March 2021, triggering 2021 Hartlepool by-election |
| 454 | John Lamont | Con | Berwickshire, Roxburgh and Selkirk | 8 Jun 2017 | |
| 455 | Douglas Ross | Con | Moray | 8 Jun 2017 | Leader of the Scottish Conservative Party |
| 456 | David Duguid | Con | Banff and Buchan | 8 Jun 2017 | |
| 457 | Bambos Charalambous | Lab | Enfield Southgate | 8 Jun 2017 | Labour Party whip suspended in June 2023. Whip restored in April 2024. |
| 458 | Dan Carden | Lab | Liverpool Walton | 8 Jun 2017 | |
| 459 | Ellie Reeves | Lab | Lewisham West and Penge | 8 Jun 2017 | Labour Party Deputy National Campaign Coordinator |
| 460 | Stephanie Peacock | Lab | Barnsley East | 8 Jun 2017 | |
| 461 | Liz Twist | Lab | Blaydon | 8 Jun 2017 | |
| 462 | Leo Docherty | Con | Aldershot | 8 Jun 2017 | |
| 463 | Bim Afolami | Con | Hitchin and Harpenden | 8 Jun 2017 | |
| 464 | Neil O'Brien | Con | Harborough | 8 Jun 2017 | |
| 465 | Alex Burghart | Con | Brentwood and Ongar | 8 Jun 2017 | |
| 466 | Jack Brereton | Con | Stoke-on-Trent South | 8 Jun 2017 | |
| 467 | Rachel Maclean | Con | Redditch | 8 Jun 2017 | |
| 468 | The Rt Hon Vicky Ford | Con | Chelmsford | 8 Jun 2017 | |
| 469 | Julia Lopez | Con | Hornchurch and Upminster | 8 Jun 2017 | |
| 470 | The Rt Hon Sir Simon Clarke | Con | Middlesbrough South and East Cleveland | 8 Jun 2017 | Former Secretary of State for Levelling Up, Housing and Communities |
| 471 | The Rt Hon Gillian Keegan | Con | Chichester | 8 Jun 2017 | Secretary of State for Education |
| 472 | Lee Rowley | Con | North East Derbyshire | 8 Jun 2017 | |
| 473 | Andrew Lewer | Con | Northampton South | 8 Jun 2017 | |
| 474 | Eddie Hughes | Con | Walsall North | 8 Jun 2017 | |
| 475 | Giles Watling | Con | Clacton | 8 Jun 2017 | |
| 476 | Damien Moore | Con | Southport | 8 Jun 2017 | |
| 477 | Bob Seely | Con | Isle of Wight | 8 Jun 2017 | |
| 478 | Stephen Morgan | Lab | Portsmouth South | 8 Jun 2017 | |
| 479 | Anna McMorrin | Lab | Cardiff North | 8 Jun 2017 | |
| 480 | Preet Gill | Lab | Birmingham Edgbaston | 8 Jun 2017 | Former Shadow Secretary of State for International Development |
| 481 | Ben Bradley | Con | Mansfield | 8 Jun 2017 | |
| 482 | Matt Rodda | Lab | Reading East | 8 Jun 2017 | |
| 483 | The Rt Hon Kemi Badenoch | Con | Saffron Walden | 8 Jun 2017 | Secretary of State for Business and Trade, President of the Board of Trade and Minister for Women and Equalities |
| 484 | Layla Moran | LD | Oxford West and Abingdon | 8 Jun 2017 | Liberal Democrat Spokesperson for Foreign, Commonwealth and Development Affairs |
| 485 | Sarah Jones | Lab | Croydon Central | 8 Jun 2017 | |
| 486 | Rosie Duffield | Lab | Canterbury | 8 Jun 2017 | |
| 487 | Lloyd Russell-Moyle | Ind | Brighton Kemptown | 8 Jun 2017 | Whip suspended May 2024 |
| 488 | Janet Daby | Lab | Lewisham East | 14 June 2018 | Elected at the 2018 Lewisham East by-election. |
| 489 | Ruth Jones | Lab | Newport West | 5 April 2019 | Elected at the 2019 Newport West by-election. |
58th Parliament (elected: 12 December 2019, first met: 17 December 2019, dissolved: 30 May 2024)
| 490 | Richard Fuller | Con | North East Bedfordshire | 12 Dec 2019 | Previously served 2010–2017. |
| 491 | Karl McCartney | Con | Lincoln | 12 Dec 2019 | Previously served 2010–2017. |
| 492 | Anthony Mangnall | Con | Totnes | 12 Dec 2019 | |
| 493 | Chris Loder | Con | West Dorset | 12 Dec 2019 | |
| 494 | Paul Bristow | Con | Peterborough | 12 Dec 2019 | |
| 495 | Greg Smith | Con | Buckingham | 12 Dec 2019 | |
| 496 | Jo Gideon | Con | Stoke-on-Trent Central | 12 Dec 2019 | |
| 497 | Marco Longhi | Con | Dudley North | 12 Dec 2019 | |
| 498 | Amanda Solloway | Con | Derby North | 12 Dec 2019 | Previously served 2015–2017. |
| 499 | Mark Jenkinson | Con | Workington | 12 Dec 2019 | |
| 500 | Kirsten Oswald | SNP | East Renfrewshire | 12 Dec 2019 | SNP Spokesperson for Women & Equalities. Former SNP Westminster Group Deputy Leader. Previously served 2015–2017. |
| 501 | Robin Millar | Con | Aberconwy | 12 Dec 2019 | |
| 502 | Tahir Ali | Lab | Birmingham Hall Green | 12 Dec 2019 | |
| 503 | Kieran Mullan | Con | Crewe and Nantwich | 12 Dec 2019 | |
| 504 | Tom Randall | Con | Gedling | 12 Dec 2019 | |
| 505 | James Grundy | Con | Leigh | 12 Dec 2019 | |
| 506 | Dean Russell | Con | Watford | 12 Dec 2019 | |
| 507 | Nick Fletcher | Con | Don Valley | 12 Dec 2019 | |
| 508 | Imran Ahmad Khan | Ind | Wakefield | 12 Dec 2019 | Conservative Party whip was suspended in October 2020. Expelled from the party in April 2022. Resigned on 3 May 2022, triggering the 2022 Wakefield by-election. |
| 509 | Margaret Ferrier | Ind | Rutherglen and Hamilton West | 12 Dec 2019 | Previously served 2015–2017. SNP whip was suspended in October 2020. Removed from Parliament on 1 August 2023 as a result of a recall petition, triggering the 2023 Rutherglen and Hamilton West by-election. |
| 510 | Robert Largan | Con | High Peak | 12 Dec 2019 | |
| 511 | Jacob Young | Con | Redcar | 12 Dec 2019 | |
| 512 | Jason McCartney | Con | Colne Valley | 12 Dec 2019 | Previously served 2010–2017. |
| 513 | The Rt Hon Owen Thompson | SNP | Midlothian | 12 Dec 2019 | SNP Westminster Chief Whip. Previously served 2015–2017. |
| 514 | Gareth Bacon | Con | Orpington | 12 Dec 2019 | |
| 515 | Ben Spencer | Con | Runnymede and Weybridge | 12 Dec 2019 | |
| 516 | Mark Fletcher | Con | Bolsover | 12 Dec 2019 | |
| 517 | Fay Jones | Con | Brecon and Radnorshire | 12 Dec 2019 | |
| 518 | Simon Baynes | Con | Clwyd South | 12 Dec 2019 | |
| 519 | Chris Clarkson | Con | Heywood and Middleton | 12 Dec 2019 | |
| 520 | Christian Wakeford | Lab | Bury South | 12 Dec 2019 | Elected as Conservative, defected to Labour in January 2022 |
| 521 | Paul Holmes | Con | Eastleigh | 12 Dec 2019 | |
| 522 | Jonathan Gullis | Con | Stoke-on-Trent North | 12 Dec 2019 | |
| 523 | Feryal Clark | Lab | Enfield North | 12 Dec 2019 | |
| 524 | Nicola Richards | Con | West Bromwich East | 12 Dec 2019 | |
| 525 | The Rt Hon Richard Holden | Con | North West Durham | 12 Dec 2019 | Chairman of the Conservative Party and Minister without portfolio |
| 526 | Peter Gibson | Con | Darlington | 12 Dec 2019 | |
| 527 | Jane Hunt | Con | Loughborough | 12 Dec 2019 | |
| 528 | Aaron Bell | Con | Newcastle-under-Lyme | 12 Dec 2019 | |
| 529 | Dehenna Davison | Con | Bishop Auckland | 12 Dec 2019 | |
| 530 | Paul Howell | Con | Sedgefield | 12 Dec 2019 | |
| 531 | Ben Everitt | Con | Milton Keynes North | 12 Dec 2019 | |
| 532 | Flick Drummond | Con | Meon Valley | 12 Dec 2019 | Previously served 2015–2017. |
| 533 | Danny Kruger | Con | Devizes | 12 Dec 2019 | |
| 534 | The Rt Hon Craig Williams | Con | Montgomeryshire | 12 Dec 2019 | Previously served 2015–2017. |
| 535 | Mark Logan | Con | Bolton North East | 12 Dec 2019 | |
| 536 | James Daly | Con | Bury North | 12 Dec 2019 | |
| 537 | Edward Timpson | Con | Eddisbury | 12 Dec 2019 | Previously served 2008–2017. |
| 538 | Natalie Elphicke | Lab | Dover | 12 Dec 2019 | Elected as Conservative, defected to Labour in May 2024 |
| 539 | Lee Anderson | Reform | Ashfield | 12 Dec 2019 | Conservative whip was suspended February 2024, joined Reform UK in March |
| 540 | Sarah Olney | LD | Richmond Park | 12 Dec 2019 | Liberal Democrat Spokesperson for Energy and Climate Change, Business and Industrial Strategy and Transport. Previously served 2016–2017. |
| 541 | Daisy Cooper | LD | St Albans | 12 Dec 2019 | Deputy Leader of the Liberal Democrats. Liberal Democrat Spokesperson on Education |
| 542 | Wendy Chamberlain | LD | North East Fife | 12 Dec 2019 | Chief Whip of the Liberal Democrats. Liberal Democrat Spokesperson for Work and Pensions, Scotland and Wales |
| 543 | Claire Hanna | SDLP | Belfast South | 12 Dec 2019 | |
| 544 | Nickie Aiken | Con | Cities of London and Westminster | 12 Dec 2019 | |
| 545 | Siobhan Baillie | Con | Stroud | 12 Dec 2019 | |
| 546 | Alicia Kearns | Con | Rutland and Melton | 12 Dec 2019 | Chair of the Foreign Affairs Select Committee |
| 547 | Ruth Edwards | Con | Rushcliffe | 12 Dec 2019 | |
| 548 | Joy Morrissey | Con | Beaconsfield | 12 Dec 2019 | |
| 549 | Luke Evans | Con | Bosworth | 12 Dec 2019 | |
| 550 | Julie Marson | Con | Hertford and Stortford | 12 Dec 2019 | |
| 551 | Jane Stevenson | Con | Wolverhampton North East | 12 Dec 2019 | |
| 552 | Zarah Sultana | Lab | Coventry South | 12 Dec 2019 | |
| 553 | Apsana Begum | Lab | Poplar and Limehouse | 12 Dec 2019 | |
| 554 | The Hon Jerome Mayhew | Con | Broadland | 12 Dec 2019 | |
| 555 | James Wild | Con | North West Norfolk | 12 Dec 2019 | |
| 556 | Gareth Davies | Con | Grantham and Stamford | 12 Dec 2019 | |
| 557 | Stuart Anderson | Con | Wolverhampton South West | 12 Dec 2019 | |
| 558 | Felicity Buchan | Con | Kensington | 12 Dec 2019 | |
| 559 | James Davies | Con | Vale of Clwyd | 12 Dec 2019 | Previously served 2015–2017. |
| 560 | Caroline Ansell | Con | Eastbourne | 12 Dec 2019 | Previously served 2015–2017. |
| 561 | Jamie Wallis | Con | Bridgend | 12 Dec 2019 | |
| 562 | Sarah Atherton | Con | Wrexham | 12 Dec 2019 | |
| 563 | Virginia Crosbie | Con | Ynys Môn | 12 Dec 2019 | |
| 564 | Miriam Cates | Con | Penistone and Stocksbridge | 12 Dec 2019 | |
| 565 | Duncan Baker | Con | North Norfolk | 12 Dec 2019 | |
| 566 | Brendan Clarke-Smith | Con | Bassetlaw | 12 Dec 2019 | |
| 567 | Kate Griffiths | Con | Burton | 12 Dec 2019 | |
| 568 | Suzanne Webb | Con | Stourbridge | 12 Dec 2019 | |
| 569 | Shaun Bailey | Con | West Bromwich West | 12 Dec 2019 | |
| 570 | Gary Sambrook | Con | Birmingham Northfield | 12 Dec 2019 | |
| 571 | Rob Roberts | Ind | Delyn | 12 Dec 2019 | Conservative Party whip was suspended in July 2021. |
| 572 | Munira Wilson | LD | Twickenham | 12 Dec 2019 | Liberal Democrat Spokesperson for Health and Social Care |
| 573 | Anthony Browne | Con | South Cambridgeshire | 12 Dec 2019 | |
| 574 | Cherilyn Mackrory | Con | Truro and Falmouth | 12 Dec 2019 | |
| 575 | Anne McLaughlin | SNP | Glasgow North East | 12 Dec 2019 | SNP Spokesperson for International Development. Previously served 2015–2017. |
| 576 | Laura Farris | Con | Newbury | 12 Dec 2019 | |
| 577 | Ian Levy | Con | Blyth Valley | 12 Dec 2019 | |
| 578 | Katherine Fletcher | Con | South Ribble | 12 Dec 2019 | |
| 579 | Sara Britcliffe | Con | Hyndburn | 12 Dec 2019 | |
| 580 | Antony Higginbotham | Con | Burnley | 12 Dec 2019 | |
| 581 | The Rt Hon Claire Coutinho | Con | East Surrey | 12 Dec 2019 | Secretary of State for Energy Security and Net Zero |
| 582 | Darren Henry | Con | Broxtowe | 12 Dec 2019 | |
| 583 | Rob Butler | Con | Aylesbury | 12 Dec 2019 | |
| 584 | David Simmonds | Con | Ruislip, Northwood and Pinner | 12 Dec 2019 | |
| 585 | Matt Vickers | Con | Stockton South | 12 Dec 2019 | |
| 586 | Robbie Moore | Con | Keighley | 12 Dec 2019 | |
| 587 | Holly Mumby-Croft | Con | Scunthorpe | 12 Dec 2019 | |
| 588 | Lia Nici | Con | Great Grimsby | 12 Dec 2019 | |
| 589 | Simon Jupp | Con | East Devon | 12 Dec 2019 | |
| 590 | Tom Hunt | Con | Ipswich | 12 Dec 2019 | |
| 591 | Abena Oppong-Asare | Lab | Erith and Thamesmead | 12 Dec 2019 | |
| 592 | James Murray | Lab | Ealing North | 12 Dec 2019 | |
| 593 | Selaine Saxby | Con | North Devon | 12 Dec 2019 | |
| 594 | Saqib Bhatti | Con | Meriden | 12 Dec 2019 | |
| 595 | Bell Ribeiro-Addy | Lab | Streatham | 12 Dec 2019 | |
| 596 | Mary Foy | Lab | City of Durham | 12 Dec 2019 | |
| 597 | Mick Whitley | Lab | Birkenhead | 12 Dec 2019 | |
| 598 | Paula Barker | Lab | Liverpool Wavertree | 12 Dec 2019 | |
| 599 | Kim Johnson | Lab | Liverpool Riverside | 12 Dec 2019 | |
| 600 | Navendu Mishra | Lab | Stockport | 12 Dec 2019 | |
| 601 | Carla Lockhart | DUP | Upper Bann | 12 Dec 2019 | |
| 602 | Ian Byrne | Lab | Liverpool West Derby | 12 Dec 2019 | |
| 603 | Beth Winter | Lab | Cynon Valley | 12 Dec 2019 | |
| 604 | Sarah Dines | Con | Derbyshire Dales | 12 Dec 2019 | |
| 605 | Steven Bonnar | SNP | Coatbridge, Chryston and Bellshill | 12 Dec 2019 | SNP Spokesperson for Environment, Food and Rural Affairs |
| 606 | Allan Dorans | SNP | Ayr, Carrick and Cumnock | 12 Dec 2019 | |
| 607 | Alyn Smith | SNP | Stirling | 12 Dec 2019 | SNP Spokesperson for Europe and EU Accession |
| 608 | Dave Doogan | SNP | Angus | 12 Dec 2019 | SNP Spokesperson for Energy Security and Net Zero |
| 609 | Kenny MacAskill | Alba | East Lothian | 12 Dec 2019 | Elected as SNP, defected to Alba in March 2021. |
| 610 | Richard Thomson | SNP | Gordon | 12 Dec 2019 | SNP Spokesperson for Business and Trade, Northern Ireland and Wales |
| 611 | Amy Callaghan | SNP | East Dunbartonshire | 12 Dec 2019 | SNP Spokesperson for Health |
| 612 | Alex Davies-Jones | Lab | Pontypridd | 12 Dec 2019 | |
| 613 | Rachel Hopkins | Lab | Luton South | 12 Dec 2019 | |
| 614 | Stephen Farry | APNI | North Down | 12 Dec 2019 | Deputy Leader of the Alliance Party of Northern Ireland |
| 615 | Scott Benton | Ind | Blackpool South | 12 Dec 2019 | Conservative Party whip was suspended in April 2023. Resigned 25 March 2024, triggering the 2024 Blackpool South by-election. |
| 616 | Kate Osborne | Lab | Jarrow | 12 Dec 2019 | |
| 617 | Gagan Mohindra | Con | South West Hertfordshire | 12 Dec 2019 | |
| 618 | Nadia Whittome | Lab | Nottingham East | 12 Dec 2019 | |
| 619 | Neale Hanvey | Alba | Kirkcaldy and Cowdenbeath | 12 Dec 2019 | Elected as SNP, defected to Alba in March 2021. |
| 620 | Taiwo Owatemi | Lab | Coventry North West | 12 Dec 2019 | |
| 621 | James Sunderland | Con | Bracknell | 12 Dec 2019 | |
| 622 | Fleur Anderson | Lab | Putney | 12 Dec 2019 | |
| 623 | Florence Eshalomi | Lab | Vauxhall | 12 Dec 2019 | |
| 624 | Sarah Owen | Lab | Luton North | 12 Dec 2019 | |
| 625 | Andrew Griffith | Con | Arundel and South Downs | 12 Dec 2019 | |
| 626 | Claudia Webbe | Ind | Leicester East | 12 Dec 2019 | Labour Party whip was suspended in September 2020. Expelled from the party in November 2021. |
| 627 | David Johnston | Con | Wantage | 12 Dec 2019 | |
| 628 | Sally-Ann Hart | Con | Hastings and Rye | 12 Dec 2019 | |
| 629 | Angela Richardson | Con | Guildford | 12 Dec 2019 | |
| 630 | The Hon Olivia Blake | Lab | Sheffield Hallam | 12 Dec 2019 | |
| 631 | Andy Carter | Con | Warrington South | 12 Dec 2019 | |
| 632 | Charlotte Nichols | Lab | Warrington North | 12 Dec 2019 | |
| 633 | Alexander Stafford | Con | Rother Valley | 12 Dec 2019 | |
| 634 | Simon Fell | Con | Barrow and Furness | 12 Dec 2019 | |
| 635 | The Rt Hon Laura Trott | Con | Sevenoaks | 12 Dec 2019 | Chief Secretary to the Treasury |
| 636 | Theo Clarke | Con | Stafford | 12 Dec 2019 | |
| 637 | Sam Tarry | Lab | Ilford South | 12 Dec 2019 | |
| 638 | Neil Hudson | Con | Penrith and The Border | 12 Dec 2019 | |
| 639 | Elliot Colburn | Con | Carshalton and Wallington | 12 Dec 2019 | |
| 640 | Mark Eastwood | Con | Dewsbury | 12 Dec 2019 | |
| 641 | John Nicolson | SNP | Ochil and South Perthshire | 12 Dec 2019 | SNP Spokesperson for Culture, Media and Sport. Previously served 2015–2017. |
| 642 | Colum Eastwood | SDLP | Foyle | 12 Dec 2019 | Leader of the SDLP |
| 643 | The Rt Hon Stephen Flynn | SNP | Aberdeen South | 12 Dec 2019 | SNP Westminster Group Leader |
| 644 | Jill Mortimer | Con | Hartlepool | 6 May 2021 | Elected at the 2021 Hartlepool by-election |
| 645 | Anum Qaisar | SNP | Airdrie and Shotts | 13 May 2021 | Elected at the 2021 Airdrie and Shotts by-election. SNP Spokesperson for Levelling Up, Housing and Communities |
| 646 | Sarah Green | LD | Chesham and Amersham | 17 Jun 2021 | Elected at the 2021 Chesham and Amersham by-election |
| 647 | Kim Leadbeater | Lab | Batley and Spen | 1 Jul 2021 | Elected at the 2021 Batley and Spen by-election |
| 648 | Louie French | Con | Old Bexley and Sidcup | 2 Dec 2021 | Elected at the 2021 Old Bexley and Sidcup by-election |
| 649 | Helen Morgan | LD | North Shropshire | 16 Dec 2021 | Elected at the 2021 North Shropshire by-election |
| 650 | Anna Firth | Con | Southend West | 3 Feb 2022 | Elected at the 2022 Southend West by-election |
| 651 | Paulette Hamilton | Lab | Birmingham Erdington | 3 Mar 2022 | Elected at the 2022 Birmingham Erdington by-election |
| 652 | Simon Lightwood | Lab | Wakefield | 24 June 2022 | Elected at the 2022 Wakefield by-election |
| 653 | Richard Foord | LD | Tiverton and Honiton | 24 June 2022 | Elected at the 2022 Tiverton and Honiton by-election |
| 654 | Samantha Dixon | Lab | City of Chester | 1 Dec 2022 | Elected at the 2022 City of Chester by-election |
| 655 | Andrew Western | Lab | Stretford and Urmston | 15 Dec 2022 | Elected at the 2022 Stretford and Urmston by-election |
| 656 | Ashley Dalton | Lab | West Lancashire | 9 Feb 2023 | Elected at the 2023 West Lancashire by-election |
| 657 | Keir Mather | Lab | Selby and Ainsty | 20 July 2023 | Baby of the House. Elected at the 2023 Selby and Ainsty by-election. |
| 658 | Steve Tuckwell | Con | Uxbridge and South Ruislip | 20 July 2023 | Elected at the 2023 Uxbridge and South Ruislip by-election |
| 659 | Sarah Dyke | LD | Somerton and Frome | 20 July 2023 | Elected at the 2023 Somerton and Frome by-election |
| 660 | Michael Shanks | Lab | Rutherglen and Hamilton West | 5 Oct 2023 | Elected at the 2023 Rutherglen and Hamilton West by-election |
| 661 | Sarah Edwards | Lab | Tamworth | 19 Oct 2023 | Elected at the 2023 Tamworth by-election |
| 662 | Alistair Strathern | Lab | Mid Bedfordshire | 19 Oct 2023 | Elected at the 2023 Mid Bedfordshire by-election |
| 663 | Gen Kitchen | Lab | Wellingborough | 15 Feb 2024 | Elected at the 2024 Wellingborough by-election |
| 664 | Damien Egan | Lab | Kingswood | 15 Feb 2024 | Elected at the 2024 Kingswood by-election |
| 665 | George Galloway | WPB | Rochdale | 29 Feb 2024 | Elected at the 2024 Rochdale by-election. Previously served 1987–2010 and 2012–2015. |
| 666 | Chris Webb | Lab | Blackpool South | 2 May 2024 | Elected at the 2024 Blackpool South by-election. |
Members who have never been sworn in
| – | Paul Maskey | SF | Belfast West | 9 Jun 2011 | Elected at the 2011 Belfast West by-election |
| – | Francie Molloy | SF | Mid Ulster | 7 Mar 2013 | Elected at the 2013 Mid Ulster by-election |
| – | Mickey Brady | SF | Newry and Armagh | 7 May 2015 | |
| – | Michelle Gildernew | SF | Fermanagh and South Tyrone | 8 Jun 2017 | Previously served 2001–2015 |
| – | Chris Hazzard | SF | South Down | 8 Jun 2017 | |
| – | Órfhlaith Begley | SF | West Tyrone | 3 May 2018 | Elected at the 2018 West Tyrone by-election. |
| – | John Finucane | SF | Belfast North | 12 Dec 2019 | |

== See also ==
- List of MPs elected in the 2019 United Kingdom general election
- List of United Kingdom by-elections (2010–present)
- List of United Kingdom MPs by seniority (2024–present)
