= Scottish National Party frontbench team =

Scottish National Party frontbench team may refer to:

- Frontbench Team of Angus Robertson
- Frontbench Team of Ian Blackford
- Frontbench Team of Stephen Flynn
