= Frontbench of Angus Robertson =

- 2015–2017
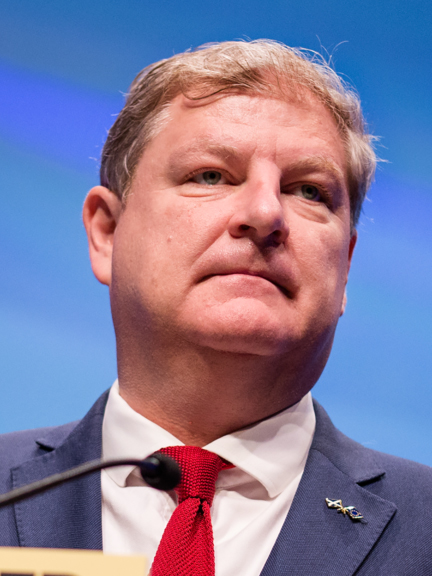
- Date formed: 20 May 2015
- Date dissolved: 3 May 2017

People and organisations
- Leader: Angus Robertson
- Deputy Leader: Stewart Hosie
- Member party: Scottish National Party
- Status in legislature: Third party 56 / 650 (9%)

History
- Election: 2015 general election
- Legislature terms: 56th UK Parliament; 58th UK Parliament
- Successor: Blackford Frontbench

The list that follows was an unofficial shadow cabinet of the SNP led by Angus Robertson from 2015 to June 2017, after the Scottish National Party (SNP) became the third-largest party in the UK Parliament after the 2015 general election, and up until the defeat of Angus Robertson and other key SNP politicians in the 2017 general election. The Frontbench Team consisted exclusively of Members of the House of Commons, since the SNP has a policy of not appointing peers to the House of Lords.

== Scottish National Party Frontbench Team ==
=== Westminster Group Leadership ===
Name	Portfolio
The Rt Hon Angus Robertson MP	Leader of the Scottish National Party Parliamentary Group; Depute Leader of the Scottish National Party
Stewart Hosie MP	Deputy Leader of the Scottish National Party Parliamentary Group; Spokesperson for the Economy
The Rt Hon Alex Salmond MP	Spokesperson for International Affairs and Europe
Brendan O'Hara MP	Spokesperson for Defence
Joanna Cherry QC MP	Spokesperson for Justice and Home Affairs
Hannah Bardell MP (Note: Hannah Bardell MP replaced Michelle Thomson after she resigned the SNP whip in 2015.)	Spokesperson for Business, Innovation and Skills
Tasmina Ahmed-Sheikh OBE WS NP MP	Spokesperson for Trade and Investment
Eilidh Whiteford MP	Spokesperson for Work and Pensions
Neil Gray MP (Note: Neil Gray MP replaced Hannah Bardell after she became the SNP's Business Spokesperson in 2015.)	Spokesperson for Fair Work and Employment
Carol Monaghan MP	Spokesperson for Education
Philippa Whitford MP	Spokesperson for Health
Callum McCaig MP	Spokesperson for Energy and Climate Change
Calum Kerr MP	Spokesperson for Environment and Rural Affairs
Drew Hendry MP	Spokesperson for Transport
Pete Wishart MP	Shadow Leader of the House of Commons
Mike Weir MP	Chief Whip of the House of Commons
Deidre Brock MP	Liaison to the Scottish Parliament and the Scottish Government

=== Other Spokespeople ===
Name	Portfolio
Scotland and Constitution
Tommy Sheppard MP	SNP Spokesperson on the Cabinet Office
Margaret Ferrier MP	SNP Spokesperson on the Scotland Office
Kirsty Blackman MP	SNP Spokesperson on the House of Lords
Economy
Roger Mullin MP	SNP Spokesperson on the Treasury
John Nicolson MP	SNP Spokesperson on Culture, Media and Sport
Alison Thewliss MP	SNP Spokesperson on Cities
Social Justice and Welfare
Natalie McGarry MP (Note: resigned the SNP whip 24 November 2015 and no longer spokesman for Disabilities.)	SNP Spokesperson on Disabilities
Ian Blackford MP	SNP Spokesperson on Pensions
Justice and Home Affairs
Stuart McDonald MP	SNP Spokesperson on Immigration, Asylum and Border Control
Angela Crawley MP	SNP Spokesperson on Equalities, Women and Children
Anne McLaughlin MP	SNP Spokesperson on Civil Liberties
International Affairs
Stephen Gethins MP	SNP Spokesperson on Europe
Patrick Grady MP	SNP Spokesperson on International Development
Lisa Cameron MP	SNP Spokesperson on Climate Justice
Defence
Kirsten Oswald MP	SNP Spokesperson on the Armed Forces and Veterans

=== Whips Office ===
Name	Portfolio
Mike Weir MP	SNP Westminster Chief Whip
Marion Fellows MP	SNP Whip
Owen Thompson MP	SNP Whip

== See also ==
- Cabinet of the United Kingdom
- Official Opposition Shadow Cabinet (UK)
