= John West (Scottish politician) =

Scottish politician

John West (born 1988) was Depute Provost of Aberdeen City Council from May 2007 until July 2009. He became the youngest person elected as a Local Authority councillor in Scotland on 3 May 2007 at the age of eighteen with the Scottish National Party. He was elected to Aberdeen City Council by the Hazlehead, Ashley and Queens Cross Ward.

His election to the position of Depute Provost drew both praise and criticism, due to his young age. His older sister, Kirsty Blackman (born 1986) is also a SNP politician, elected as councillor for the Hilton/Stockethill area in 2007 and as MP for Aberdeen North in 2015. West masterminded Kevin Stewart's election as Aberdeen Central MSP in May 2011.

He did not seek to be re-elected in the 2012 Scottish Local Elections.

== Sources ==
- "Teenager set for new civic post", BBC News.
- "Fresh-faced challenge", The Guardian.
