= Dundee Central =

UK Parliament constituency (since 2024)

- Borough constituency for the House of Commons
- Interactive map of boundaries from 2024
- Boundary of Dundee Central in Scotland
- Subdivisions of Scotland: Dundee
- Electorate: 75,298 (March 2020)
- Major settlements: Dundee

Current constituency
- Created: 2024
- Member of Parliament: Chris Law (SNP)
- Seats: One
- Created from: Dundee East & Dundee West

Dundee Central is a constituency of the House of Commons in the UK Parliament. It was first contested at the 2024 general election. It is currently represented by Chris Law of the Scottish National Party, who was MP for the predecessor seat of Dundee West from 2015 to 2024.

== Boundaries ==
The constituency comprises the following wards of the City of Dundee:

- Strathmartine, Lochee, West End, Coldside, Maryfield and East End (except the Douglas and Angus area).

It covers the whole of the abolished Dundee West constituency, except the small part in Angus Council, together with western parts of the former Dundee East constituency, which has largely been replaced by Arbroath and Broughty Ferry.

== Election results ==
=== Elections in the 2020s ===
General election 2024: Dundee Central
Party	Candidate	Votes	%	±%
SNP	Chris Law	15,544	40.0	−16.5
Labour	Richard McCready	14,869	38.3	+14.5
Liberal Democrats	Daniel Coleman	2,402	6.2	+0.7
Reform UK	Vicky McCann	2,363	6.1	+3.5
Conservative	Emma Farquhar	1,569	4.0	−7.1
Alba	Alan Ross	813	2.1	N/A
TUSC	Jim McFarlane	600	1.5	N/A
Scottish Family	Susan Ettle	357	0.9	N/A
Workers Party	Raymond Mennie	192	0.5	N/A
Independent	Niko Omilana	139	0.4	N/A
Majority		675	1.7	
Turnout		38,848	52.3	
SNP hold		Swing	−15.4	

=== Elections in the 2010s ===
2019 notional result (Note: Estimate of the 2019 general election result as if the revised boundaries recommended under the 2023 boundary review were in place)
Party	Vote	%
SNP	26,347	56.5
Labour	11,126	23.8
Conservative	5,161	11.1
Liberal Democrats	2,586	5.5
Brexit Party	1,191	2.6
Other	240	0.5
Majority	15,221	32.6
Turnout	46,651	62.0
Electorate	75,298	
