= Kirsty Blackman =

Scottish politician (born 1986)

Kirsty Blackman MP
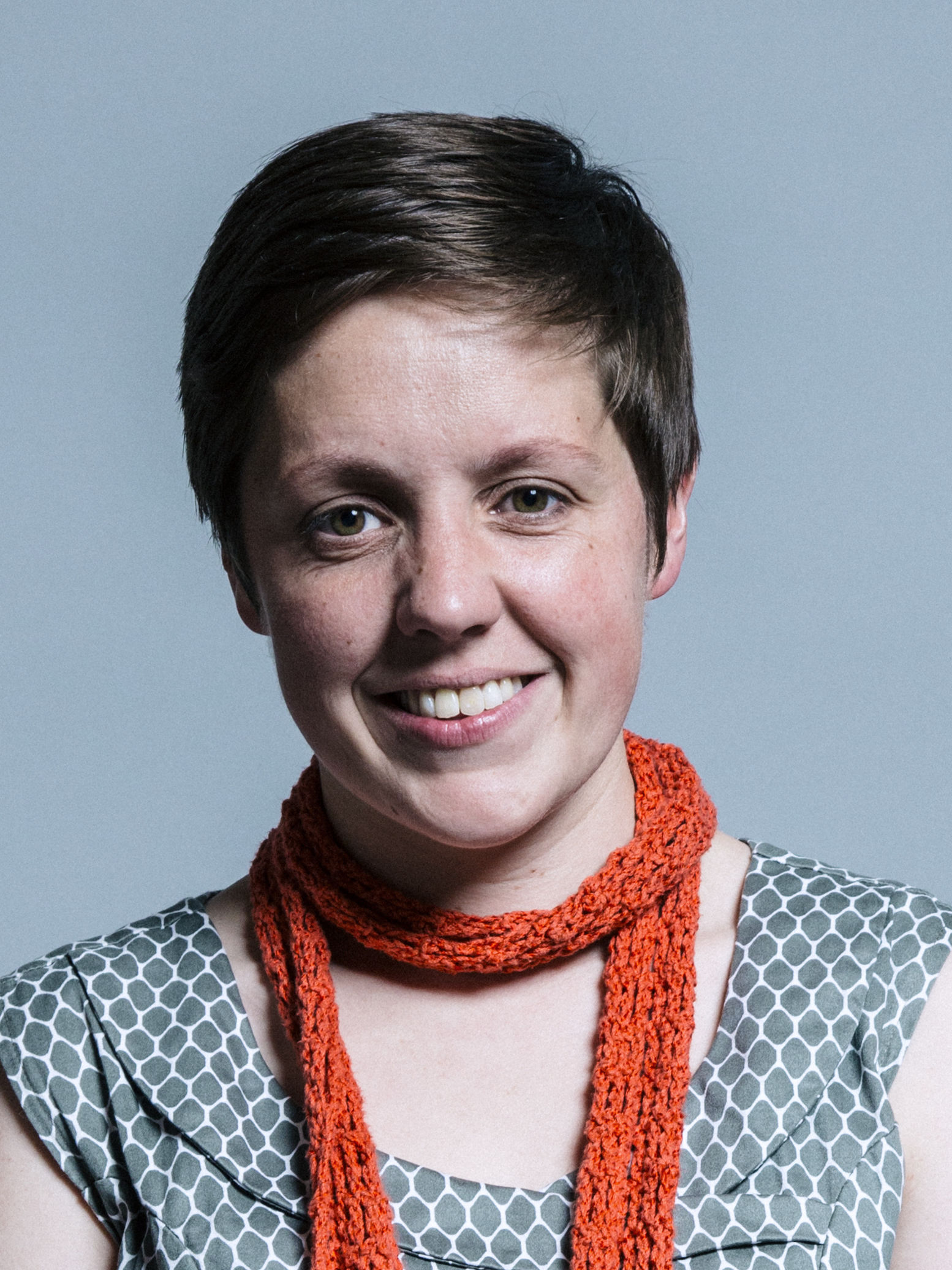
- Official portrait, 2017

Chief Whip of the Scottish National Party in the House of Commons
- Incumbent
- Assumed office 5 July 2024
- Leader: Stephen Flynn; Dave Doogan
- Preceded by: Owen Thompson

SNP Spokesperson for the Cabinet Office in the House of Commons
- In office 10 December 2022 – 4 July 2024
- Leader: Stephen Flynn
- Preceded by: Stewart Hosie
- Succeeded by: Brendan O'Hara

SNP Spokesperson for Work and Pensions in the House of Commons
- Incumbent
- Assumed office 10 July 2024
- Leader: Stephen Flynn; Dave Doogan
- In office 29 March 2022 – 10 December 2022
- Leader: Ian Blackford
- Preceded by: David Linden
- Succeeded by: David Linden

SNP Spokesperson for the Constitution in the House of Commons
- In office 7 January 2019 – 10 December 2022
- Leader: Ian Blackford
- Preceded by: Office established

Deputy Leader of the Scottish National Party in the House of Commons
- In office 14 June 2017 – 1 July 2020
- Leader: Ian Blackford
- Preceded by: Stewart Hosie
- Succeeded by: Kirsten Oswald

SNP Spokesperson for the Treasury in the House of Commons
- In office 20 June 2017 – 7 January 2019
- Leader: Ian Blackford
- Preceded by: Stewart Hosie
- Succeeded by: Alison Thewliss

SNP Spokesperson for the Equalities in the House of Commons
- Incumbent
- Assumed office 10 July 2024
- Leader: Stephen Flynn; Dave Doogan
- Preceded by: Kirsten Oswald

Member of Parliament for Aberdeen North
- Incumbent
- Assumed office 7 May 2015
- Preceded by: Frank Doran
- Majority: 1,779 (4.2%)

Personal details
- Born: Kirsty Ann West; 20 March 1986 (age 40) Aberdeen, Scotland
- Party: Scottish National Party
- Spouse: Luke Blackman
- Children: 2
- Website: Commons website

Kirsty Blackman (née West; born 20 March 1986) is a Scottish politician. A member of the Scottish National Party (SNP), she has been the Member of Parliament (MP) for Aberdeen North since 2015.

Blackman was re-elected in 2017, 2019 and 2024, and currently serves as the SNP Chief Whip, previously serving as Spokesperson for the Cabinet Office, Spokesperson for the Treasury from 2017 to 2019, the SNP Deputy Westminster Leader from 2017 to 2020, and the SNP Spokesperson for Work and Pensions from March to December 2022.

== Early life ==
Blackman was educated at Robert Gordon's College after winning a scholarship. She matriculated at the University of Aberdeen to study medicine, but later dropped out.

She first entered politics when she was elected to Aberdeen City Council as an SNP councillor in the Hilton/Stockethill ward, in the Aberdeen North constituency in the 2007 Aberdeen City Council election topping the poll in her ward with 1,761 first preferences. Her brother, John West, was also elected for the Hazlehead/Ashley/Queens Cross ward in the same election. She was re-elected in 2012 Aberdeen City Council election with 823 first preferences taking the second seat in the ward. She then became the convener of the SNP group in Aberdeen City Council.

== Parliamentary career ==
At the 2015 general election, she became the Member of Parliament for Aberdeen North. She succeeded Frank Doran, of the Labour Party, who had announced in October 2013 that he would stand down at the next general election. She won the seat with 24,793 votes, 13,396 more than the Labour Party candidate Richard Baker, and became SNP Spokesperson on the House of Lords. In April 2016, she drew attention to the plight of unaccompanied refugee children during a Commons debate. She was elected to the Scottish Affairs Committee in 2015. In July 2016, she spoke out on the importance of making Parliament more family-friendly after being censured by clerks for holding her sleeping two-year-old daughter in a committee hearing.

She retained her seat at the 2017 general election. Following the election, she became Deputy Leader of the SNP Westminster Group and SNP Westminster Spokesperson on the Economy. This made her the first woman to lead on the economy for a major party in the House of Commons.

Blackman held the seat at the 2019 general election with a majority of 33.9%, the largest percentage majority in Scotland. In January 2019, she became the SNP Spokesperson for the Constitution at Westminster, a strategic role leading on the constitution in preparation for an independence referendum.

In July 2020 Blackman announced that she would be stepping down as the deputy leader of the SNP Westminster Group, saying "Like many others, I've struggled with the impact that lockdown has had on my mental health. In order to prioritise my constituency and my family, I have made the difficult personal decision to step down from my Leadership role. I strongly believe that people must be able to talk openly about mental health issues, which affect so many of us". On 7 July it was announced that Kirsten Oswald was to be her successor. On 24 September 2020 she spoke more about suffering with depression.

In January 2021, Blackman publicly criticised former party leader Alex Salmond, labelling him an "awful human".

In February 2021, Blackman clashed on Twitter with fellow MP Joanna Cherry about transgender rights.

In November 2021, Blackman wrote a tweet on benefit sanctions that was thought to make a political point while referencing the suicide of the wife of the Conservative MP Owen Paterson. Rose Paterson committed suicide by hanging in June 2020. She later tweeted "After some reflection, I have deleted a tweet I made earlier. I offer my unreserved apologies for tweeting it, particularly to anyone who may have been upset or offended. I'm sorry".

In March 2022, she returned to the SNP frontbench on the Department for Work and Pensions portfolio. In September 2022, she spoke out against cuts to Universal credit as a result of Liz Truss's controversial budget warning the UK Government was "threatening to cut their family budgets further, with a new regime of benefit sanctions".

In May 2022, Chancellor Rishi Sunak introduced a windfall tax on the soaring profits of energy companies to pay for a series of measures that would help people with the cost of living crisis. Blackman complained to the BBC that, "It feels very unfair that Scotland is having to pay for the entirety of the UK" as most of the tax revenue came from oil and gas "income made in Scotland". The remarks led to some debate about the nature of pooling and sharing of resources and Alistair Carmichael opined in The Scotsman that, "There is nothing progressive about saying that families in England, Wales and Northern Ireland must go cold and hungry because nationalism says that we should keep oil money here in Scotland."

In December 2022, under the new leadership of Stephen Flynn she became the SNP lead on the Cabinet Office, as well as deputy whip. In January 2023, she called for an independent inquiry into claims of BBC chair Richard Sharp providing Boris Johnson with a loan to fund his lifestyle while prime minister.

In April 2023, she ran for chair of the Energy Security and Net Zero Select Committee, a chair which had been allocated to an SNP politicians, against Stewart Malcolm McDonald and Angus MacNeil. She came second, in the election, open to all MPs to vote in, by 14 votes.

In the 2024 general election, she was re-elected with a much reduced majority against the Labour swing. She is now the only female SNP MP.

== Personal life ==
Blackman is married to Luke Blackman, with whom she has two children. In 2023, she tweeted that she was "not straight".

Parliament of the United Kingdom
Preceded by Frank Doran	Member of Parliament for Aberdeen North; 2015–present	Incumbent
Party political offices
Preceded by Stewart Hosie	Deputy Leader of the Scottish National Party in the House of Commons; 2017–2020	Succeeded by Kirsten Oswald
