= Chris Law =

Scottish politician

Chris Law MP
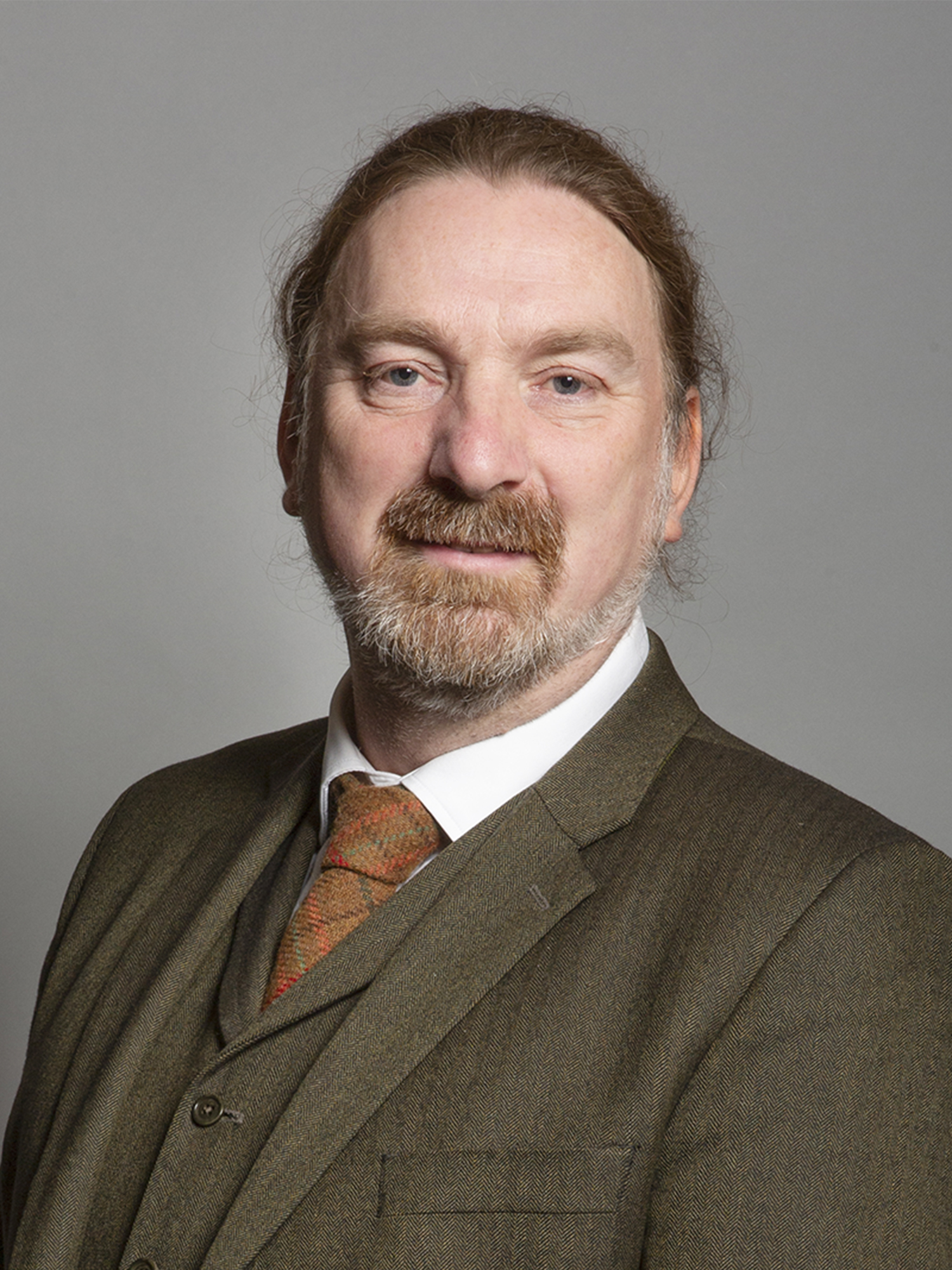
- Official portrait, 2019

SNP Spokesperson for International Development in the House of Commons
- Incumbent
- Assumed office 10 May 2024
- Leader: Stephen Flynn; Dave Doogan
- Preceded by: Anne McLaughlin
- In office 20 June 2017 – 8 December 2022
- Leader: Ian Blackford
- Preceded by: Alex Salmond
- Succeeded by: Brendan O'Hara

SNP Spokesperson for Businnes and Trade in the House of Commons
- Incumbent
- Assumed office 10 July 2024
- Leader: Stephen Flynn; Dave Doogan
- Preceded by: Richard Thomson

Member of Parliament for Dundee Central Dundee West (2015–2024)
- Incumbent
- Assumed office 7 May 2015
- Preceded by: Jim McGovern
- Majority: 675 (1.7%)

Personal details
- Born: Christopher Murray Alexander Law; 21 October 1969 (age 56) Edinburgh, Scotland
- Party: Scottish National Party
- Education: University of St Andrews
- Website: Official website

Christopher Murray Alexander Law (born 21 October 1969) is a Scottish National Party (SNP) politician serving as the Member of Parliament (MP) for Dundee Central, formerly Dundee West, since 2015. He was first elected at the 2015 general election, winning a seat that had been held by Labour for the previous 65 years. He served as SNP Spokesperson for International Development from 2017 to 2022, resigning from his position after the election of Stephen Flynn. Following his re-election in 2024, he returned to the SNP's frontbench as SNP Spokesperson for Business, Trade and Development.

== Early life and education ==
Law was born in Edinburgh in 1969 and grew up in Fife, where he attended Glenwood High in Glenrothes then later Madras College in St Andrews. Law later trained as a French chef, then went to the University of St Andrews where he received a degree in Social Anthropology. He developed a love of India while at university and for ten years operated a business providing tours of the Himalayas on 1950s motorcycles. For a decade after returning to Scotland he operated a business as a financial adviser in Dundee. Law initially joined the SNP in 1999, and rejoined after returning to the UK in 2010.

In March 2018, Law said that he had spent time in social care in his teenage years in St Andrews. In January 2019, he wrote about caring for his mother who had multiple sclerosis and supported a campaign by the i newspaper to raise money for MS Society. Citing his time in respite care, he has been a prominent supporter of the campaign to amend the Equality Act 2010 to make care experience a protected characteristic and helped set-up a cross-party group in Parliament for care-experienced young people.

== Spirit of Independence ==
Law was a prominent Yes Scotland campaigner during the 2014 Scottish independence referendum and was the founder of the Spirit of Independence road tour of communities that toured Scotland in a refurbished Green Goddess fire engine. The tour was launched by the actor Brian Cox in Dundee in August 2014.

Prominent members of Scottish society interviewed by Law during the tour included Yes Scotland chief executive Blair Jenkins and politicians Humza Yousaf, Annabelle Ewing and Richard Lochhead.

== Political career ==
Law was selected to contest the Dundee West constituency at the 2015 general election and received 27,684 votes – 61.9% – as he took the seat from Labour with a majority of 17,092 votes. From 2015 to 2017 he served on the Scottish Affairs Committee. At the 2017 general election, he retained his seat, receiving 18,045 votes (46.7%), down 15.3% compared to the 2015 general election two years previously. His majority was reduced to 5,262 votes - 13.6%. Following his re-election, Law was appointed SNP Westminster Spokesperson for International Development and Climate Justice, and sat as the only non-Labour or Conservative member on the International Development Committee from 2017 until 2024.

At the 2019 general election, he held his seat, receiving 22,355 votes (53.8%), up 7.1% compared to the 2017 election. His majority was increased to 12,259 - 29.5%. Following his re-election, Law was appointed SNP Shadow Secretary of State for International Development, and continued to serve on the International Development Committee.

At the 2024 general election, following the implementation of boundary changes, he contested the new seat of Dundee Central, which retained most of his previous Dundee West seat and added parts of the former Dundee East constituency. He held the seat, receiving 15,544 votes (40.0%), down 16.5% on the notional 2019 election result. His majority was reduced to 675 - 1.7%.

During his first term (2015–17) as the Member of Parliament for Dundee West, Law fought against job losses at HMRC facilities in his constituency. In his second term, he criticised the UK Government over HMRC's decision to close their Sidlaw House facility in Dundee in 2022 and move jobs to a new facility in Edinburgh.

In September 2017, Law signed a joint letter denouncing the Spanish Government's efforts to block the 2017 Catalan independence referendum.

Law was a notable critic of Aung San Suu Kyi following the Myanmar Rohingya refugee crisis, and repeatedly called for her Freedom of the City of Dundee to be stripped. In March 2018, just days before a visit to the country with the International Development Committee to investigate allegations of human rights abuses, the visas issued to members of the Committee including Law were denied.

On 25 April 2018, Law secured a debate in Westminster Hall on 'Protecting Children in Conflict'. In his speech, he called on the UK Government to do more to protect and prevent violence against children in conflict zones, such as Yemen and South Sudan.

Law served as the co-chair of the All-party parliamentary group on Video Games. In October 2018, Law backed The Independent Game Developers' Association's calls for a Video Games Investment Fund in the Chancellor's Autumn Budget.

In 2020, Law joined the All Party Parliamentary Group on Whistleblowing which has been subject to criticism by some campaigners on whistleblowing law reform.

In a debate with the UK Parliament House of Commons in March 2024, Law recognized the expulsion of Armenians from Nagorno-Karabakh as ethnic cleansing, noted the erasure and destruction of Armenian churches and crosses, criticized the UK Government for encouraging British business leaders to conduct commercial business in the region, and strongly urged the House to provide more assistance to the Armenian refugees.

In 2025, Law posted then hastily deleted a tweet criticising a state visit by Donald Trump to the UK. Law tweeted, "Sitting at tonight's banquet dinner with President Donald Trump, is conceding that it's acceptable to support genocide in Gaza after yesterday's publication of UN's report on Gaza." SNP leader and First Minister of Scotland John Swinney also attended the state dinner held at Windsor Castle as part of Donald Trump's visit. Scottish Conservatives MSP Jamie Halcro Johnston said, "There will be red faces all round in the SNP after this now deleted tweet from Chris Law. Clearly, he was in such a rush to post a childish tweet that he forgot all about John Swinney being someone attending this dinner."

== Political views ==
Law is a member of the Campaign for Nuclear Disarmament.

He is a supporter of the right of self-determination for Tibet. In Autumn 2018, he addressed the Central Tibetan Administration on a visit to Dharamshala. As co-chair of the All-Party Parliamentary Group for Tibet, Law and fellow co-chair Tim Loughton called for the EU to adopt an equivalent to the US Reciprocal Access to Tibet Act. In 2025, he was elected as Chair of the All-Party Parliamentary Group for Tibet.

He has been a supporter of drug reform laws. Following his re-election in 2019, he backed the decriminalisation of drugs and the establishment of drug consumption rooms in Dundee.

Parliament of the United Kingdom
Preceded by Jim McGovern	Member of Parliament for Dundee West; 2015–present	Incumbent
