= Drew Hendry =

Scottish National Party politician (born 1964)

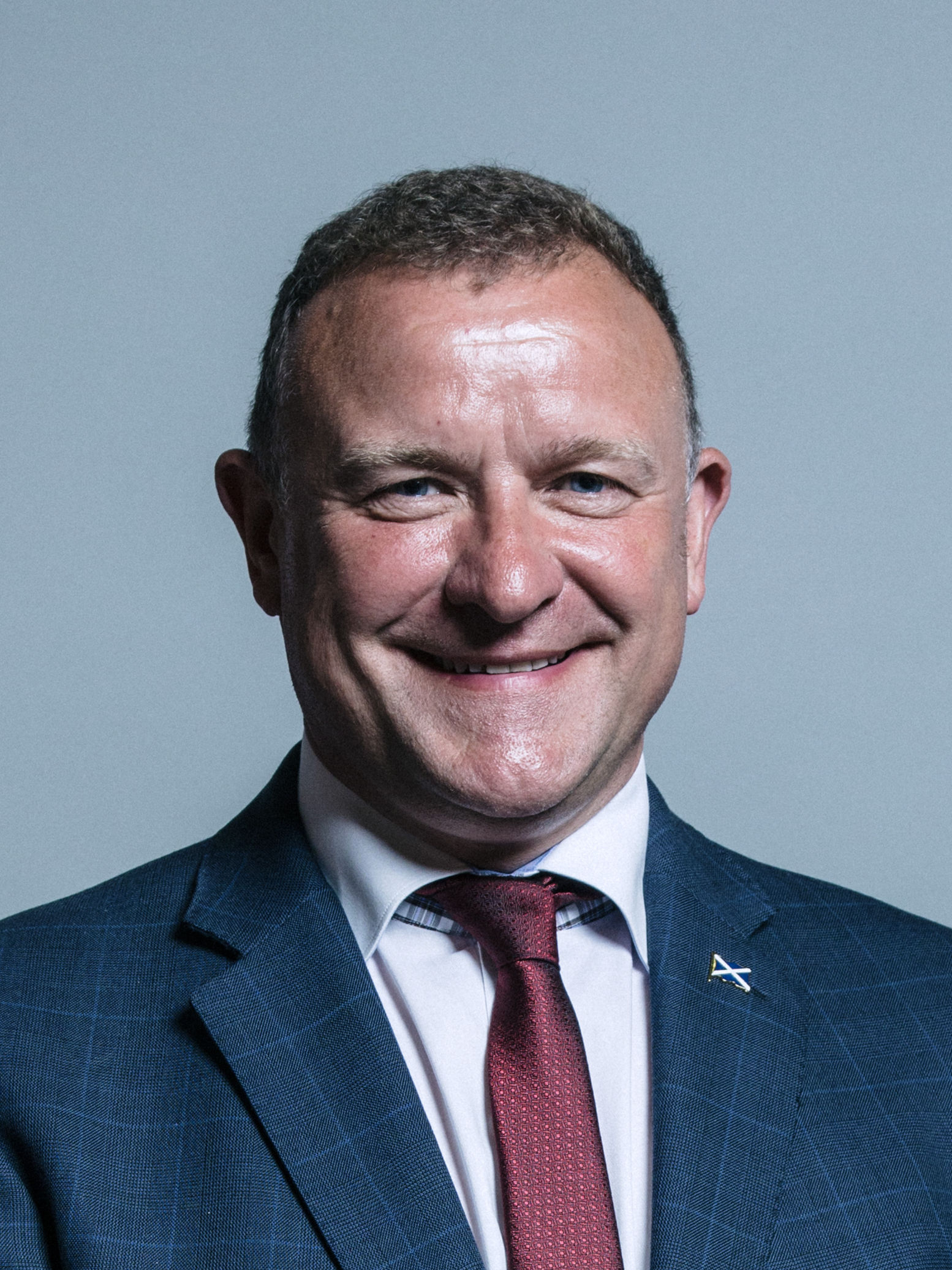
- Official portrait, 2017

SNP Treasury Spokesperson in the House of Commons
- In office 4 September 2023 – 30 May 2024
- Leader: Stephen Flynn
- Preceded by: Stewart Hosie
- Succeeded by: Office abolished

SNP Foreign Affairs Spokesperson in the House of Commons
- In office 10 December 2022 – 4 September 2023
- Leader: Stephen Flynn
- Preceded by: Alyn Smith
- Succeeded by: Brendan O'Hara

SNP Spokesperson for International Trade in the House of Commons
- In office 1 February 2021 – 10 December 2022
- Leader: Ian Blackford
- Preceded by: Stewart Hosie
- Succeeded by: Richard Thomson

SNP Spokesperson for Business, Energy and Industrial Strategy in the House of Commons
- In office 20 June 2017 – 1 February 2021
- Leader: Ian Blackford
- Preceded by: Office established
- Succeeded by: Stephen Flynn

Member of Parliament for Inverness, Nairn, Badenoch and Strathspey
- In office 7 May 2015 – 30 May 2024
- Preceded by: Danny Alexander
- Succeeded by: Constituency abolished

Personal details
- Born: Andrew Egan Henderson Hendry; 31 May 1964 (age 62) Edinburgh, Scotland
- Party: Scottish National Party
- Website: www.drewhendrymp.scot

Andrew Egan Henderson Hendry (born 31 May 1964), known as Drew Hendry, is a Scottish National Party (SNP) politician who served as Member of Parliament (MP) for Inverness, Nairn, Badenoch and Strathspey from 2015 until 2024, when the seat was abolished. Hendry served as the SNP's Economy Spokesperson in the House of Commons from September 2023 to May 2024.

He was a councillor in Highland from 2007 to 2015 and was Council Leader from 2012 to 2015.

== Early life ==
He grew up in Edinburgh. Although as a teenager he was too young to vote in the Scottish referendum of 1979 he feels this sparked his interest in politics and representation. He worked for Electrolux. He lived and worked in Edinburgh until 1999 when he and his wife moved to Tore in the Black Isle. In 1999 he founded a company, teclan ltd, in Inverness, which delivers digital marketing services for online retailers and ecommerce merchants.

He is the uncle of the wrestler Joe Hendry.

== Political career ==
=== Highland Council ===
Hendry was first elected in the 2007 Local Elections for the Aird and Loch Ness ward with 892 first preferences taking the third seat out of four. He was appointed leader of the SNP Highland Council group in 2011, replacing John Finnie who had become a list MSP for the Highlands and Islands. In September 2007, he was appointed to the board of the Cairngorms National Park Authority.

He was selected to stand as one of the SNP's candidates for the six Scotland seats in the 2009 European Parliament election, although he was fourth on their list and the outcome of the voting was the SNP returned two MEPs.

In the 2012 local elections he took the second seat in the ward, being elected with 840 first preferences and on the first count. Following the 2012 Scottish local elections the SNP, the Scottish Liberal Democrats and the Scottish Labour Party formed a coalition to run the council with Hendry as council leader. The coalition held a 44–36 majority. This was the first time that the Independents have not been involved in the administration of the Highland Council.

Prior to the formation of the administration, he was leader of the SNP group in the council. He is credited with bringing in the real living wage for council employees, along with the creation of the Science Skills Academy and, also for committing the Highland Council to achieving Carbon neutral status for Inverness by 2025 – as part of the wider 'Carbon Clever' initiative.

Having been elected as an MP, Hendry immediately resigned from his position as leader of Highland Council. Two months later, he announced that he was also resigning from his position of councillor for Aird and Loch Ness, in order to focus on his duties as an MP.

=== House of Commons ===
In November 2014 he put his name forward as a prospective candidate for the Westminster election. In January 2015 it was announced that he had been selected to contest the Inverness, Nairn, Badenoch and Strathspey constituency in the 2015 general election. The incumbent Danny Alexander had held the seat for the past 10 years and had been a key architect of the Liberal Democrats coalition deal with the Conservatives in 2010. Hendry spent less than half the amount on his campaign for this election that Alexander did. Alexander's campaign spend of £50,000 was the highest in Scotland, with 80 per cent of this money coming from wealthy individuals. Hendry won the election, beating Alexander by more than 10,000 votes.

On 20 May 2015, he was announced as one of the SNP's leadership team at Westminster and as the party's spokesperson on Transport. In 2017, he was appointed as SNP Leader for Business, Energy and Industrial Strategy.

Hendry chaired the All-Party Parliamentary Group (APPG) for the Terminally Ill.

At the 2017 election, Hendry's majority was reduced from 10,809 to 4,924.

At the 2019 election, his majority increased from 4,924 to 10,440.

In June 2020, Hendry supported the declaration of additional financial support by the Scottish Government during the summer months for students experiencing financial distress. The Scottish Government approved early exposure to £11.4 million in surplus funding to assist graduates in higher education.

In December 2020, during a debate on the Internal Market Bill, Hendry was named by Deputy Speaker Dame Rosie Winterton after he removed the mace and attempted to leave the chamber with it. He was suspended from the House of Commons for the remainder of that day's sitting.

In September 2023 Hendry was made the SNP's Economy Spokesperson, in preparation for the impending general election, in which the SNP leadership wanted to focus on the cost-of-living crisis, energy and economic growth.

In the 2024 general election, he lost his seat to Liberal Democrat Angus MacDonald.

== Post-parliamentary career ==
Following his defeat at the 2024 UK General Election, Hendry founded and was appointed Chairman of marketing company teclan Limited.

Parliament of the United Kingdom
Preceded by Danny Alexander	Member of Parliament for Inverness, Nairn, Badenoch and Strathspey; 2015–2024	Constituency abolished
