= Brendan O'Hara =

Scottish politician (born 1963)

Brendan O'Hara MP
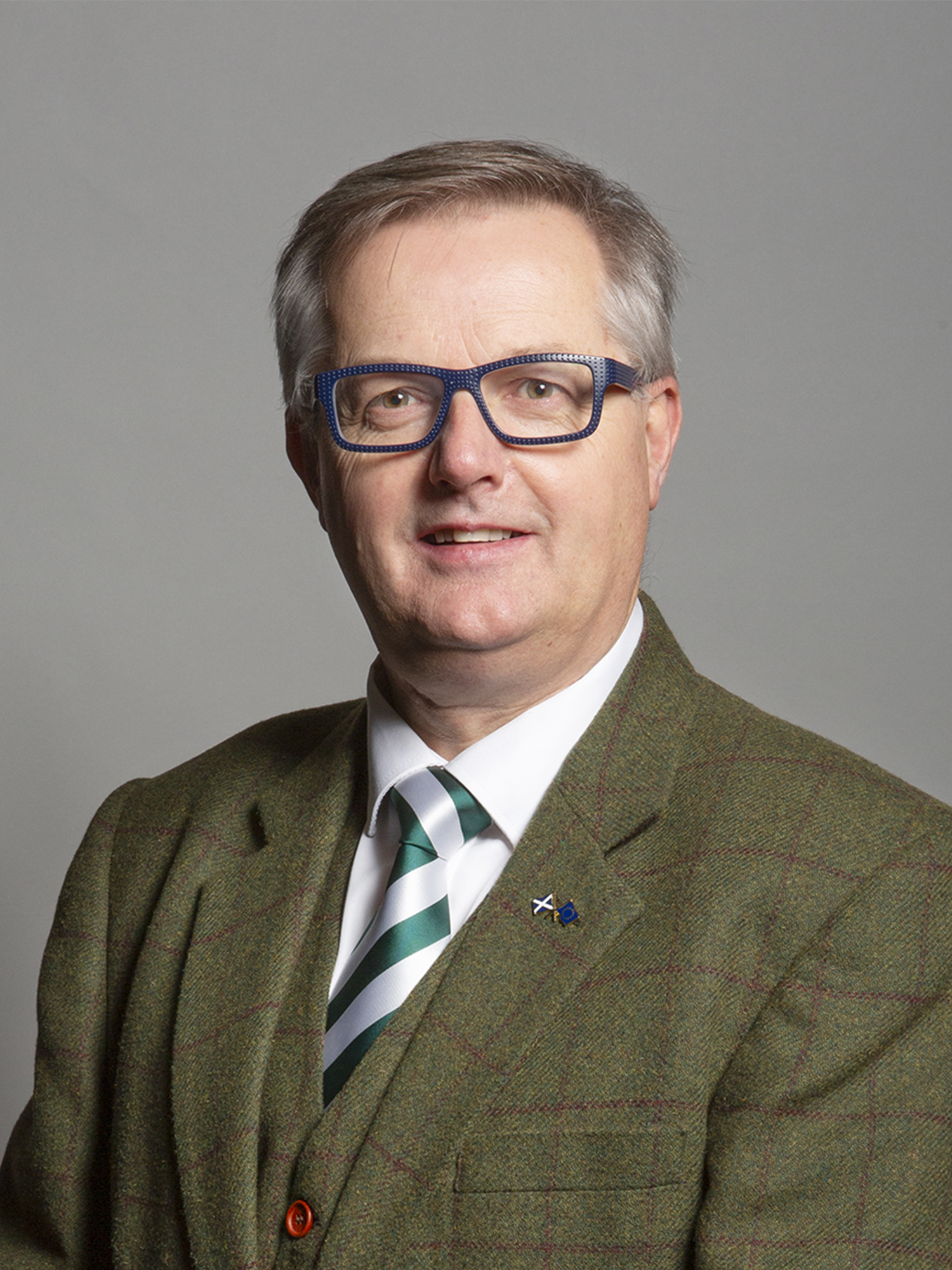
- Official portrait, 2019

SNP Foreign Affairs Spokesperson in the House of Commons
- In office 4 September 2023 – 5 July 2024
- Leader: Stephen Flynn
- Preceded by: Drew Hendry
- Succeeded by: Position abolished

Chief Whip of the Scottish National Party in the House of Commons
- In office 17 January 2023 – 4 September 2023
- Leader: Stephen Flynn
- Preceded by: Martin Docherty-Hughes
- Succeeded by: Owen Thompson

SNP Spokesperson for International Development in the House of Commons
- In office 10 December 2022 – 17 January 2023
- Leader: Stephen Flynn
- Preceded by: Chris Law
- Succeeded by: Anum Qaisar

SNP Spokesperson for Digital, Culture, Media and Sport in the House of Commons
- In office 20 June 2017 – 17 May 2018
- Leader: Ian Blackford
- Preceded by: John Nicolson
- Succeeded by: Hannah Bardell

SNP Spokesperson for Defence in the House of Commons
- In office 20 May 2015 – 20 June 2017
- Leader: Angus Robertson
- Preceded by: Angus Robertson
- Succeeded by: Stewart MacDonald

Member of Parliament for Argyll, Bute and South Lochaber Argyll and Bute (2015–2024)
- Incumbent
- Assumed office 7 May 2015
- Preceded by: Alan Reid
- Majority: 6,232 (13.9%)

Personal details
- Born: 27 April 1963 (age 63) Glasgow, Scotland
- Party: Scottish National Party
- Education: University of Strathclyde

Brendan O'Hara (born 27 April 1963) is a Scottish National Party (SNP) politician and former TV producer. He serves as Member of Parliament (MP) for the constituency of Argyll, Bute and South Lochaber since the 2024 election, having previously represented the Argyll and Bute constituency from 2015 to 2024.

He was the SNP spokesperson for Foreign Affairs from 2023 to 2024. He served as the SNP Digital, Culture, Media and Sport spokesperson from 2017 to 2018, the SNP Defence spokesperson from 2015 to 2017, SNP International Development spokesperson from 2022 to 2023, and SNP Chief Whip in 2023.

== Early life and education ==
Born in Glasgow, O'Hara was educated at St Andrew's Secondary in Carntyne and attended Strathclyde University, from where he graduated with a 2:1 in economic history and modern history.

== Director and producer ==
He has had a successful career as a TV producer. He wrote, produced and directed the Road To Referendum documentary series, which was broadcast on STV in 2013 and was subsequently nominated for a BAFTA Scotland award in the Current Affairs category. He has worked for STV, Sky Sports and the BBC. His credits include Comedy Connections and Movie Connections (BBC1), The Football Years (STV), and Scotland's Greatest Album (STV). O'Hara also worked on David Hayman's second series, following in the footsteps of Tom Weir.

== Political career ==
O'Hara was an unsuccessful SNP candidate on two occasions. He contested Glasgow Springburn at the 1987 UK general election, receiving 3,554 votes (a 10.2% share). He also stood in Glasgow Central at the 1992 UK general election and gained 6,322 votes (a 20.8% share).

In 2015, he received 22,959 votes (44.3% share) in Argyll & Bute, and unseated the sitting Liberal Democrat MP Alan Reid by 8,473 votes. On 20 May 2015, he was appointed the party's spokesman for defence. He was the first of the 2015 intake to make his maiden speech.

At the 2017 snap general election he successfully retained his seat; however, with a reduced majority of 1,328 votes to the Conservative party. At the 2019 general election he retained his seat with a majority of 4,110.

He was elected to the new seat in 2024.

Parliament of the United Kingdom
| Preceded by Alan Reid | Member of Parliament for Argyll and Bute; 2015–2024 | Constituency abolished |
| New constituency | Member of Parliament for Argyll, Bute and South Lochaber; 2024–present | Incumbent |
