= Frontbench of Ian Blackford =

Political party spokesperson group

- 2017–2022
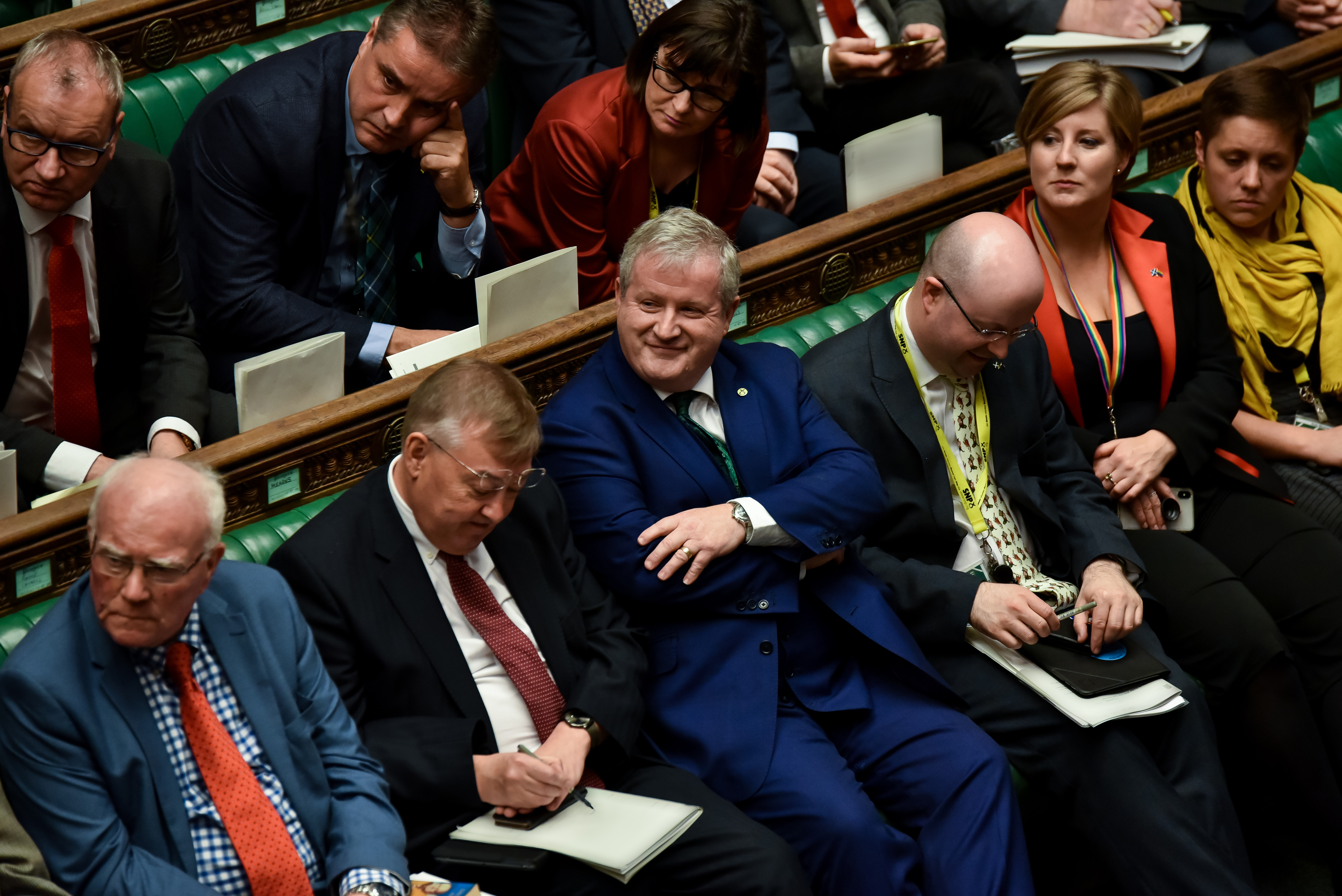
- Ian Blackford and his Frontbench team in 2019
- Date formed: 14 June 2017
- Date dissolved: 6 December 2022

People and organisations
- Leader: Ian Blackford
- Leader's history: 2017–2022
- Deputy Leader: Kirsty Blackman (2017–2020); Kirsten Oswald (2020–2022)
- Member party: Scottish National Party
- Status in legislature: Third party 44 / 650 (7%) (As of 2022)

History
- Elections: 2017 general election 2019 general election
- Legislature terms: 57th UK Parliament; 58th UK Parliament
- Predecessor: Robertson Frontbench
- Successor: Flynn Frontbench

The Frontbench Team of Ian Blackford was the team of Scottish National Party Spokespersons in the House of Commons from 2017 to 2022.

Ian Blackford, who was elected Leader of the Scottish National Party's parliamentary group in the House of Commons on 14 June 2017 following Angus Robertson's defeat in the general election, announced his frontbench team on 20 June. Blackford announced his revised frontbench team on 7 January 2020 following the 2019 general election. On 1 February 2021, a reshuffle of the SNP frontbench team at Westminster was announced.

== Blackford Westminster Group Frontbench Leadership ==
=== Frontbench ===
Name	Portfolio
The Rt Hon Ian Blackford MP	Leader of the Scottish National Party Parliamentary Group
Kirsten Oswald MP	Deputy Leader of the Scottish National Party Parliamentary Group; SNP Shadow Minister for Women and Equalities
Alison Thewliss MP	SNP Shadow Chancellor of the Exchequer
Alyn Smith MP	SNP Shadow Secretary of State for Foreign and Commonwealth Affairs
Stuart McDonald MP	SNP Shadow Secretary of State for the Home Department
Anne McLaughlin MP	SNP Shadow Secretary of State for Justice and Immigration
Philippa Whitford MP	SNP Shadow Secretary of State for Health and Social Care; SNP Shadow Minister for Europe
John Nicolson MP	SNP Shadow Secretary of State for Digital, Culture, Media and Sport
Mhairi Black MP	SNP Shadow Secretary of State for Scotland
Richard Thomson MP	SNP Shadow Secretary of State for Northern Ireland; SNP Shadow Secretary of State for Wales
Patricia Gibson MP	SNP Shadow Secretary of State for Housing, Communities and Local Government
Drew Hendry MP	SNP Shadow Secretary of State for International Trade
Stephen Flynn MP	SNP Shadow Secretary of State for Business, Energy and Industrial Strategy
Kirsty Blackman MP	SNP Shadow Secretary of State for Work and Pensions
Stewart McDonald MP	SNP Shadow Secretary of State for Defence
Angela Crawley MP	SNP Shadow Attorney General
Gavin Newlands MP	SNP Shadow Secretary of State for Transport
Carol Monaghan MP	SNP Shadow Secretary of State for Education; SNP Shadow Minister for Military Personnel and Veterans
Chris Law MP	SNP Shadow Secretary of State for International Development
Deidre Brock MP	SNP Shadow Secretary of State for Environment, Food and Rural Affairs
The Rt Hon Stewart Hosie MP	SNP Shadow Chancellor of the Duchy of Lancaster; SNP Shadow Minister for the Cabinet Office
Owen Thompson MP	SNP Shadow Leader of the House of Commons
Alan Brown MP	SNP Shadow Minister for Energy and Climate Change

=== Other Portfolio ===
Name	Portfolio
Scotland in the World
Martin Docherty-Hughes MP	Assistant Spokesperson for Defence and International Affairs
Hannah Bardell MP	Assistant Spokesperson for International Development and International Affairs
Allan Dorans MP	Assistant Spokesperson for International Affairs
Angus MacNeil MP	Assistant Spokesperson for International Trade
Finance and Economy
Peter Grant MP	Assistant Spokesperson for the Treasury
Stephen Flynn MP	Assistant Spokesperson for the Treasury
Ronnie Cowan MP	Spokesperson for Infrastructure and Manufacturing
Douglas Chapman MP	Spokesperson for Small Business and Innovation
Patricia Gibson MP	Spokesperson for Consumer Affairs
Martin Docherty-Hughes MP	Spokesperson for Future Industries and Blockchain
Richard Thomson MP	Shadow Financial Secretary
Inclusion and Wellbeing
Kirsten Oswald MP	Spokesperson for Work, Pensions and Inclusion
Amy Callaghan MP	Spokesperson for Pensions and Inter-Generational Affairs
Chris Stephens MP	Spokesperson for Fair Work and Employment
Brendan O'Hara MP	Spokesperson for an Inclusive Society
Marion Fellows MP	Spokesperson for Disabilities
Lisa Cameron MP	Spokesperson for Mental Health
Martyn Day MP	Spokesperson for Public Health and Primary Care
Constitution and Human Rights
Tommy Sheppard MP	Spokesperson for Constitutional Affairs
John McNally MP	Spokesperson for the Environment
Dave Doogan MP	Spokesperson for Agriculture and Rural Affairs
Steven Bonnar MP	Assistant Spokesperson for the Environment, Food and Rural Affairs
Leadership
Martin Docherty-Hughes MP	Parliamentary Private Secretary to Ian Blackford

=== Whips Office ===
Name	Portfolio
Owen Thompson MP	SNP Westminster Chief Whip
Marion Fellows MP	SNP Whip

=== Former members ===
Neale Hanvey, Shadow Minister for COVID Vaccine Deployment

== See also ==
- Cabinet of the United Kingdom
- Official Opposition Shadow Cabinet (United Kingdom)
- Liberal Democrat frontbench team
