= Frontbench of Stephen Flynn =

Political party spokesperson group

Frontbench Team of Stephen Flynn
- Fourth Party of the House of Commons
- 2022–2026
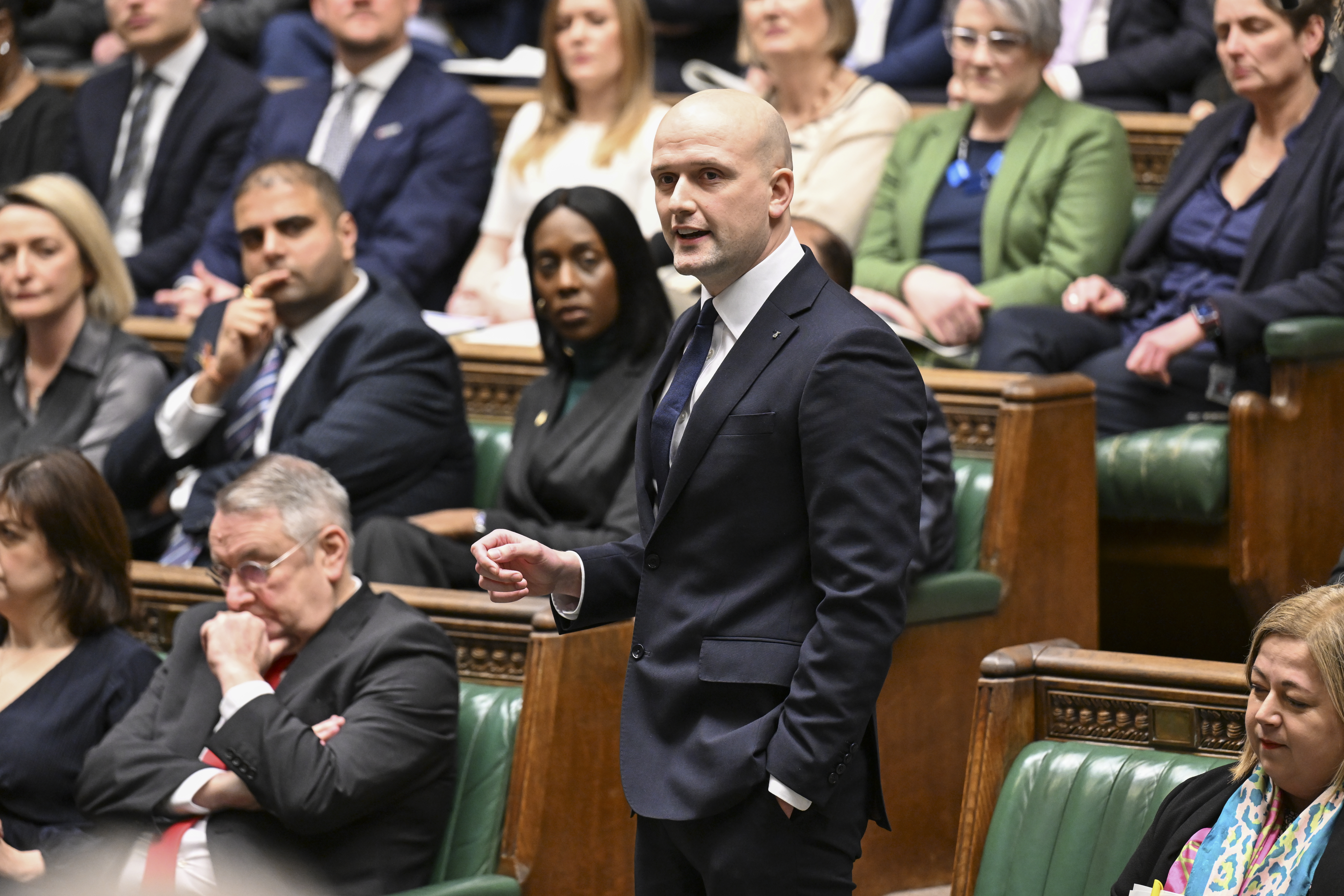
- Date formed: 10 December 2022
- Date dissolved: 10 May 2026

People and organisations
- Group Leader: Stephen Flynn
- Member party: SNP
- Status in legislature: Fourth party (from 2024) 9 / 650 (1%) Third party (2022–2024) 43 / 650 (7%)

History
- Outgoing election: 2019 general election 2024 general election
- Legislature terms: 2019 UK Parliament; 2024 UK Parliament
- Predecessor: Blackford Frontbench
- Successor: Doogan Frontbench

The Frontbench Team of Stephen Flynn was the team of Scottish National Party Spokespersons in the House of Commons from 2022 to 2026. The frontbench was first appointed on 10 December 2022.

Flynn was elected leader of the SNP Westminster Group on 6 December 2022, alongside Mhairi Black as deputy leader, following the resignation of Ian Blackford. Flynn's leadership came at a time of a cost of living crisis and when the United Kingdom's Supreme Court set out that the Scottish Parliament does not have the devolved competence to hold an independence referendum without the consent of the British Government. First Minister Nicola Sturgeon had set out plans for the next election to the House of Commons to be a proxy referendum on independence, putting the Frontbench Team at the centre of a constitutional campaign within Scotland.

In the 2024 general election, the SNP suffered huge losses losing the vast majority of their seats. As a result, Stephen Flynn unveiled a new much slimmed down frontbench including himself, Pete Wishart as his deputy and Kirsty Blackman as chief whip.

== Formation ==
Following Flynn's victory in the leadership election, Pete Wishart, Chris Law and Stewart McDonald resigned from the frontbench.

== Members ==
=== Frontbench July 2024 – May 2026 ===
Following the 2024 general election, the frontbench was reshuffled.

Portfolio	Spokesperson
Group Leader	Stephen Flynn MP
Deputy Leader; Constitution; Home Affairs	Pete Wishart MP
Chief Whip; Work and Pensions	Kirsty Blackman MP
Business and Trade; International Development	Chris Law MP
Cabinet Office; Culture, Media and Sport; Middle East	Brendan O'Hara MP
Defence; Economy	Dave Doogan MP
Environment, Food and Rural Affairs; Health and Social Care	Graham Leadbitter MP
International Affairs; Scotland	Stephen Gethins MP

=== Frontbench 2023 – 2024 ===
On 4 September 2023, Flynn reshuffled the frontbench.

Portfolio	Spokesperson
Group Leader	Stephen Flynn MP
Deputy Leader	Mhairi Black MP
Chief Whip	Owen Thompson MP
House of Commons Business	Deidre Brock MP
Economy	Drew Hendry MP
Levelling Up	Anum Qaisar MP
Social Justice	David Linden MP
Home Affairs	Alison Thewliss MP
Justice and Immigration	Chris Stephens MP
Attorney General	Patricia Gibson MP
Europe and EU Accession	Alyn Smith MP
Science, Innovation, Technology and Education	Carol Monaghan MP
Scotland	Tommy Sheppard MP
International Development	Anne McLaughlin MP
Foreign Affairs	Brendan O'Hara MP
Women and Equalities	Kirsten Oswald MP
Environment, Farming, Agriculture and Rural Affairs	Steven Bonnar MP
Cabinet Office	Kirsty Blackman MP
Business and Trade, Northern Ireland and Wales	Richard Thomson MP
Health	Amy Callaghan MP
Transport	Gavin Newlands MP
Energy Security and Net Zero	Dave Doogan MP
Digital, Culture, Media and Sport	John Nicolson MP
Defence	Martin Docherty-Hughes MP

=== Frontbench 2022 – 2023 ===
Portfolio	Spokesperson
Group Leader	Stephen Flynn MP
Deputy Leader	Mhairi Black MP
Chief Whip	Martin Docherty-Hughes MP
Economy	Stewart Hosie MP
Social Justice	David Linden MP
Home Affairs	Alison Thewliss MP
Justice and Immigration	Stuart McDonald MP
Scotland	Philippa Whitford MP
Europe and EU Accession	Alyn Smith MP
Foreign Affairs	Drew Hendry MP
Environment, Food and Rural Affairs	Patricia Gibson MP
Women and Equalities	Kirsten Oswald MP
International Trade, Northern Ireland and Wales	Richard Thomson MP
Energy and Industrial Strategy	Alan Brown MP
Digital, Culture, Media and Sport	John Nicolson MP
Defence	Dave Doogan MP
House of Commons Business	Deidre Brock MP
Levelling Up	Chris Stephens MP
Cabinet Office	Kirsty Blackman MP
Transport	Gavin Newlands MP
Health	Martyn Day MP
International Development	Brendan O'Hara MP
Education	Carol Monaghan MP
