= Rachel Gilmour =

British Liberal Democrat politician

Rachel Gilmour MP
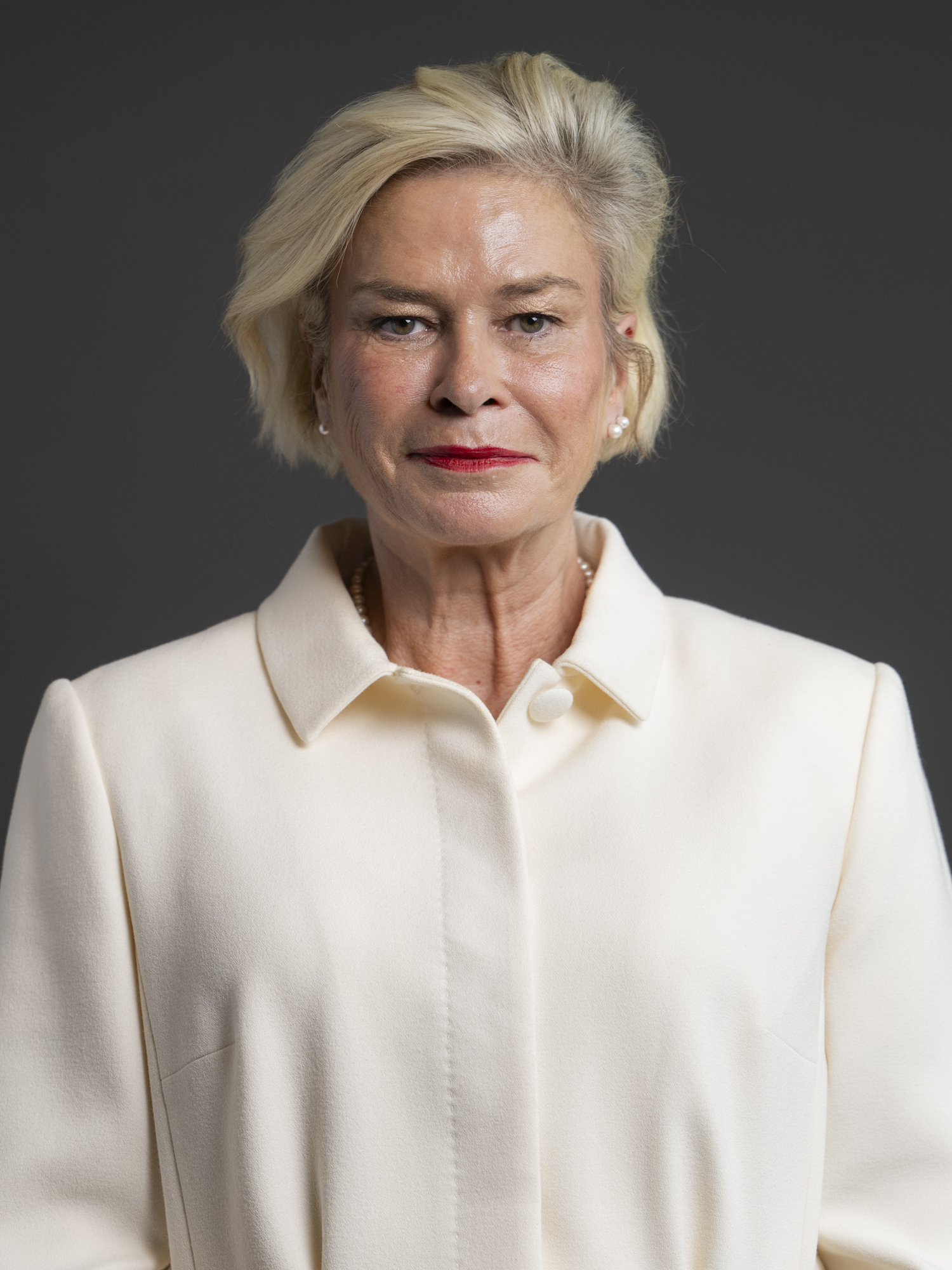
- Official portrait, 2024

Member of Parliament for Tiverton and Minehead
- Incumbent
- Assumed office 4 July 2024
- Preceded by: Constituency established
- Majority: 3,507 (7.4%)

Personal details
- Born: 13 October 1964 (age 62)
- Party: Liberal Democrats
- Parent: David Wrench (father)
- Education: SOAS University of London; King's College London
- Website: rachelgilmour.org.uk

Rachel Clare Gilmour (formerly Oliver; born 13 October 1964) is a British Liberal Democrat politician who has been the Member of Parliament for Tiverton and Minehead since 2024.

== Early life ==
Gilmour is the daughter of the former England international rugby player David Wrench. Wrench later became leader of Wellington Town Council and was a member of the Conservative Party. Gilmour grew up on the Somerset–Devon border and attended local schools including St John's Primary School in Wellington. She was then privately educated at Cheltenham Ladies' College, where she joined the Liberal Party aged 17.

She studied law at SOAS University of London and English literature at King's College London.

== Early career ==
After a stint as an English lecturer at Somerset College of Arts & Technology in Taunton, Gilmour began her career in corporate communications and public affairs. Having worked for national and international NGOs, she was appointed director of communications at the National Farmers' Union; becoming the first woman to join their board in 100 years. She went on to be head of strategy at the Environment Agency.

Most recently she was employed as director of communications for Pangea 21, a group of health tech start-ups.

== Political career ==
Gilmour contested Nottingham North as the Liberal Democrat parliamentary candidate in the 1997 general election, coming third. She contested Totnes in 2001, coming second behind Conservative incumbent Anthony Steen. The UKIP candidate in this election was Craig Mackinlay, later the Conservative MP for South Thanet. She fought both of these elections under her previous name of Rachel Oliver.

In 2015, she stood in Taunton Deane to succeed fellow Liberal Democrat Jeremy Browne, but was defeated by Conservative candidate Rebecca Pow in an election which saw the Liberal Democrats reduced to just eight parliamentary seats nationally.

She represented the Clare & Shuttern ward on Mid Devon District Council.

At the 2024 general election, Gilmour stood in the newly created seat of Tiverton and Minehead. Her Conservative opponent, Ian Liddell-Grainger, was the incumbent MP for the constituency of Bridgwater and West Somerset, which was abolished at this election and partially replaced by Tiverton and Minehead. On 4 July, Gilmour won the seat with a majority of 3,507 votes (7.4% of the vote) over Liddell-Grainger. This was in keeping with the national election results, which were the best for the Liberal Democrats and the worst for the Conservatives in modern history.

On 14 January 2025, Gilmour referred herself to the Parliamentary Commissioner for Standards after it had emerged that she had made her son one of her staff team albeit in a voluntary capacity.

In January 2025, she said that Butlin's was 'partly' to blame for the low social mobility in her constituency by offering employment that does not require qualifications.

On 18 March 2025, the BBC reported that during Gilmour's visit to Hinkley Point Nuclear Power Station in her constituency, she was abusive to a security guard after he had pointed out that her driving licence was expired and that he had informed the police. Witnesses stated that she described a film presented by site workers with further abusive language. She denied the allegations.

On 18 July 2025, the Daily Telegraph reported that Gilmour had submitted an expenses claim for £11.81 in December 2024 for a pub meal, which included chips, a halloumi wrap, a hot drink, and a half-pint of cider. The claim was subsequently rejected.

In August 2026, Gilmour posted a video on Facebook warning against the use of disposable barbecues during the ongoing dry conditions. She referred to the Stourbridge wildfires and stated that someone there had used a disposable barbecue. At the time, West Midlands Fire Service had not publicly established that a disposable barbecue was responsible for the Stourbridge fire; specialist investigators were still investigating the origin of the fire.

=== Elections contested ===
Election	Constituency	Party	Votes	% votes	Position	Ref.
1997 general election	Nottingham North	Liberal Democrats	3,301	8.0	3rd of 5	
2001 general election	Totnes	Liberal Democrats	18,317	37.2	2nd of 4	
2015 general election	Taunton Deane	Liberal Democrats	12,358	21.3	2nd of 8	
2023 Mid Devon District Council election	Clare & Shuttern ward (two seats)	Liberal Democrats	732	54.4	2nd of 4 (elected)	
2024 general election	Tiverton and Minehead	Liberal Democrats	18,326	38.6	1st of 5 (elected)	

== Personal life ==
Gilmour lives in Bampton with her husband, Patrick, a corporate lawyer. They have a son and a daughter. She also has two sons from her first marriage. She and Patrick share their home and garden with two dogs, three cats, and twenty-two rescue chickens.
