= List of parliamentary gains and losses in the 2015 United Kingdom general election =

This is a list of parliamentary constituencies that changed political allegiance in the United Kingdom general election on 7 May 2015. This includes those seats that changed parties in by-elections but were regained on 7 May. It does not include those where a new member has been elected from the same party as the previous incumbent.

== Constituencies ==
Constituency	Region	Party of incumbent before election	Party of incumbent after election	Notes
Aberdeen South	Scotland	Labour	Scottish National Party	
Airdrie and Shotts	Scotland	Labour	Scottish National Party	
Ayr, Carrick and Cumnock	Scotland	Labour	Scottish National Party	
Bath	South West	Liberal Democrats	Conservative Party	
Belfast East	Northern Ireland	Alliance	Democratic Unionist Party	
Bermondsey and Old Southwark	London	Liberal Democrats	Labour Party	
Berwick-upon-Tweed	North East	Liberal Democrats	Conservative Party	
Berwickshire, Roxburgh and Selkirk	Scotland	Liberal Democrats	Scottish National Party	
Birmingham, Yardley	West Midlands	Liberal Democrats	Labour Party	
Bolton West	North West	Labour	Conservative Party	
Bradford East	Yorkshire and the Humber	Liberal Democrats	Labour Party	
Bradford West	Yorkshire and the Humber	Respect	Labour Party	
Brecon and Radnorshire	Wales	Liberal Democrats	Conservative Party	
Brent Central	London	Liberal Democrats	Labour Party	
Brentford and Isleworth	London	Conservative	Labour Party	
Bristol West	South West	Liberal Democrats	Labour Party	
Burnley	North West	Liberal Democrats	Labour Party	
Caithness, Sutherland and Easter Ross	Scotland	Liberal Democrats	Scottish National Party	
Cambridge	Eastern	Liberal Democrats	Labour Party	
Cardiff Central	Wales	Liberal Democrats	Labour Party	
Central Ayrshire	Scotland	Labour	Scottish National Party	
Cheadle	North West	Liberal Democrats	Conservative Party	
Cheltenham	South West	Liberal Democrats	Conservative Party	
Chippenham	South West	Liberal Democrats	Conservative Party	
City of Chester	North West	Conservative	Labour Party	
Coatbridge, Chryston and Bellshill	Scotland	Labour	Scottish National Party	
Colchester	Eastern	Liberal Democrats	Conservative Party	
Corby	East Midlands	Labour Co-operative	Conservative Party	
Cumbernauld, Kilsyth and Kirkintilloch East	Scotland	Labour	Scottish National Party	
Derby North	East Midlands	Labour	Conservative Party	
Dewsbury	Yorkshire and the Humber	Conservative	Labour Party	
Dumfries and Galloway	Scotland	Labour	Scottish National Party	
Dundee West	Scotland	Labour	Scottish National Party	
Dunfermline and West Fife	Scotland	Labour	Scottish National Party	
Ealing Central and Acton	London	Conservative	Labour Party	
East Dunbartonshire	Scotland	Liberal Democrats	Scottish National Party	
East Kilbride, Strathaven and Lesmahagow	Scotland	Labour	Scottish National Party	
East Lothian	Scotland	Labour	Scottish National Party	
East Renfrewshire	Scotland	Labour	Scottish National Party	
Eastbourne	South East	Liberal Democrats	Conservative Party	
Eastleigh	South East	Liberal Democrats	Conservative Party	
Edinburgh East	Scotland	Labour	Scottish National Party	
Edinburgh North and Leith	Scotland	Labour Co-operative	Scottish National Party	
Edinburgh South West	Scotland	Labour	Scottish National Party	
Edinburgh West	Scotland	Liberal Democrats	Scottish National Party	
Enfield North	London	Conservative	Labour Party	
Falkirk	Scotland	Labour	Scottish National Party	
Fermanagh and South Tyrone	Northern Ireland	Sinn Féin	Ulster Unionist Party	
Glasgow Central	Scotland	Labour	Scottish National Party	
Glasgow East	Scotland	Labour	Scottish National Party	
Glasgow North	Scotland	Labour	Scottish National Party	
Glasgow North East	Scotland	Labour	Scottish National Party	
Glasgow North West	Scotland	Labour	Scottish National Party	
Glasgow South	Scotland	Labour	Scottish National Party	
Glasgow South West	Scotland	Labour Co-operative	Scottish National Party	
Glenrothes	Scotland	Labour	Scottish National Party	
Gordon	Scotland	Liberal Democrats	Scottish National Party	
Gower	Wales	Labour	Conservative Party	
Hazel Grove	North West	Liberal Democrats	Conservative Party	
Hornsey and Wood Green	London	Liberal Democrats	Labour Party	
Hove	South East	Conservative	Labour Party	
Ilford North	London	Conservative	Labour Party	
Inverclyde	Scotland	Labour	Scottish National Party	
Inverness, Nairn, Badenoch and Strathspey	Scotland	Liberal Democrats	Scottish National Party	
Kilmarnock and Loudoun	Scotland	Labour Co-operative	Scottish National Party	
Kingston and Surbiton	London	Liberal Democrats	Conservative Party	
Kirkcaldy and Cowdenbeath	Scotland	Labour	Scottish National Party	
Lanark and Hamilton East	Scotland	Labour	Scottish National Party	
Lancaster and Fleetwood	North West	Conservative	Labour Party	
Lewes	South East	Liberal Democrats	Conservative Party	
Linlithgow and East Falkirk	Scotland	Labour	Scottish National Party	
Livingston	Scotland	Labour	Scottish National Party	
Mid Dorset and North Poole	South West	Liberal Democrats	Conservative Party	
Midlothian	Scotland	Labour	Scottish National Party	
Morley and Outwood	Yorkshire and the Humber	Labour Co-operative	Conservative Party	
Motherwell and Wishaw	Scotland	Labour	Scottish National Party	
North Ayrshire and Arran	Scotland	Labour	Scottish National Party	
North Cornwall	South West	Liberal Democrats	Conservative Party	
North Devon	South West	Liberal Democrats	Conservative Party	
North East Fife	Scotland	Liberal Democrats	Scottish National Party	
Norwich South	Eastern	Liberal Democrats	Labour Party	
Paisley and Renfrewshire North	Scotland	Labour	Scottish National Party	
Paisley and Renfrewshire South	Scotland	Labour	Scottish National Party	
Plymouth, Moor View	South West	Labour	Conservative Party	
Portsmouth South	South East	Liberal Democrats	Conservative Party	
Redcar	North East	Liberal Democrats	Labour Co-operative	
Rochester and Strood	South East	UKIP	Conservative Party	
Ross, Skye and Lochaber	Scotland	Liberal Democrats	Scottish National Party	
Rutherglen and Hamilton West	Scotland	Labour Co-operative	Scottish National Party	
Solihull	West Midlands	Liberal Democrats	Conservative Party	
Somerton and Frome	South West	Liberal Democrats	Conservative Party	
South Antrim	Northern Ireland	DUP	Ulster Unionist Party	
Southampton Itchen	South East	Labour	Conservative Party	
St Austell and Newquay	South West	Liberal Democrats	Conservative Party	
St Ives	South West	Liberal Democrats	Conservative Party	
Stirling	Scotland	Labour	Scottish National Party	
Sutton and Cheam	London	Liberal Democrats	Conservative Party	
Taunton Deane	South West	Liberal Democrats	Conservative Party	
Telford	West Midlands	Labour	Conservative Party	
Thornbury and Yate	South West	Liberal Democrats	Conservative Party	
Torbay	South West	Liberal Democrats	Conservative Party	
Twickenham	London	Liberal Democrats	Conservative Party	
Vale of Clwyd	Wales	Labour	Conservative Party	
Wells	South West	Liberal Democrats	Conservative Party	
West Aberdeenshire and Kincardine	Scotland	Liberal Democrats	Scottish National Party	
West Dunbartonshire	Scotland	Labour Co-operative	Scottish National Party	
Wirral West	North West	Conservative	Labour Party	
Wolverhampton South West	West Midlands	Conservative	Labour Party	
Yeovil	South West	Liberal Democrats	Conservative Party	

== See also ==
- 2015 United Kingdom general election
