= Stockleigh Pomeroy =

Village in Devon, England

Coordinates: 50.822941°N 3.59123°W

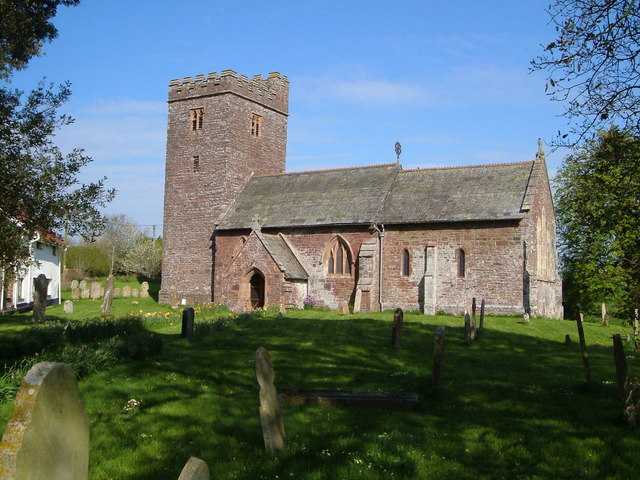
- St Mary's church, Stockleigh Pomeroy

- Location within Devon
- Population: 117 (2011 UK Census)
- District: Mid Devon
- Shire county: Devon
- Region: South West
- Country: England
- Sovereign state: United Kingdom
- Post town: Crediton
- Postcode district: EX17
- Police: Devon and Cornwall
- Fire: Devon and Somerset
- Ambulance: South Western
- UK Parliament: Central Devon

Stockleigh Pomeroy is a village and civil parish in Devon, England at the foot of the Raddon Hills. The parish church which is dedicated to St Mary the Virgin has a Norman doorway.

In 2016, a new village hall was opened to replace the Nissen hut used formerly which was opened in 1950. The new hall was built using grants from various bodies as well as contributions from the local community of both time and money.
