= Taunton and Wellington =

UK Parliament constituency (since 2024)

- County constituency for the House of Commons
- Boundary of Taunton and Wellington in South West England
- County: Somerset
- Electorate: 76,049 (2023)
- Major settlements: Norton Fitzwarren, Taunton, Wellington, Wiveliscombe

Current constituency
- Created: 2024
- Member of Parliament: Gideon Amos (Liberal Democrat)
- Seats: One
- Created from: Taunton Deane

Taunton and Wellington is a constituency of the House of Commons in the UK Parliament. Further to the completion of the 2023 review of Westminster constituencies, it was first contested at the 2024 UK general election, with Gideon Amos of the Liberal Democrats taking the seat with a majority of 11,939. The predecessor seat, Taunton Deane, had been held by Rebecca Pow of the Conservative Party since 2015.

== Constituency profile ==
Taunton

Taunton and Wellington is a constituency in Somerset in South West England. Its largest town is Taunton, which has a population of around 64,000. Other settlements include the town of Wellington and the villages of Rockwell Green, Norton Fitzwarren and West Monkton.

Taunton is a historic market town with a tradition of rural industries like wool production and silk weaving. Wellington is a smaller market town with a history of cloth making. Both towns were important stopping and trading points on the road between Bristol and Exeter. Most of the constituency has average levels of wealth; there is some deprivation in central Taunton but the town's south-western suburbs are affluent. House prices are generally lower than the regional and UK averages.

Taunton and Wellington has a large retired population and a below-average proportion of young adults. Residents have average levels of income, homeownership and education. Rates of child poverty and unemployment are low, and a high proportion of residents work in the health, agriculture and public sectors. White people made up 94% of the population at the 2021 census.

At the local council, most of this constituency is represented by Liberal Democrats with some Conservatives elected in the rural villages. An estimated 53% of voters in Taunton and Wellington supported leaving the European Union in the 2016 referendum, similar to the UK-wide figure of 52%.

== Boundaries ==
Map of boundaries from 2024

Under the 2023 Periodic Review of Westminster constituencies, the constituency was defined as being composed of the following as they existed on 1 December 2020:

- The District of Somerset West and Taunton wards of: Blackbrook & Holway; Comeytrowe & Bishop’s Hull; Creech St. Michael; Halcon & Lane; Hatch & Blackdown; Manor & Tangier; Monument; North Curry & Ruishton; North Town; Norton Fitzwarren & Staplegrove; Priorswood; Rockwell Green; Trull, Pitminster and Corfe; Victoria; Vivary; Wellington East; Wellington North; Wellington South; Wellsprings & Rowbarton; West Monkton & Cheddon Fitzpaine; Wilton & Sherford.

With effect from 1 April 2023, the District of Somerset West and Taunton was abolished and absorbed into the new unitary authority of Somerset. Consequently, the constituency now comprises the following electoral divisions of Somerset from the 2024 general election:

- Bishop's Hull and Taunton West; Blackdown and Neroche; Comeytrowe and Trull; Lydeard (part); Monkton and North Curry; Rowbarton and Staplegrove; Taunton East; Taunton North; Taunton South; Upper Tone (small part); Wellington.

The seat comprises the majority of the former Taunton Deane constituency, with Wiveliscombe and surrounding rural areas being included in the newly created constituency of Tiverton and Minehead.

== Members of Parliament ==
=== 2024–present ===
Election	Member	Party
2024	Gideon Amos	Liberal Democrats

== Elections ==
=== Elections in the 2020s ===
General election 2024: Taunton and Wellington
Party	Candidate	Votes	%	±%
Liberal Democrats	Gideon Amos	24,331	48.4	+12.1
Conservative	Rebecca Pow	12,392	24.6	−27.4
Reform	Charles Hansard	8,053	16.0	N/A
Labour	Brenda Weston	3,552	7.1	−0.8
Green	Ryan Trower	1,832	3.6	N/A
Communist	Rochelle Russell	134	0.3	N/A
Majority		11,939	23.8	
Turnout		50,294	64.4	−7.2
Registered electors		78,116		
Liberal Democrats gain from Conservative		Swing	+19.8	

2019 notional result
Party	Vote	%
Conservative	28,298	52.0
Liberal Democrats	19,762	36.3
Labour	4,299	7.9
Independent	2,081	3.8
Turnout	54,440	71.6
Electorate	76,049	
