= Jenny Riddell-Carpenter =

British politician

Jenny Riddell-Carpenter MP
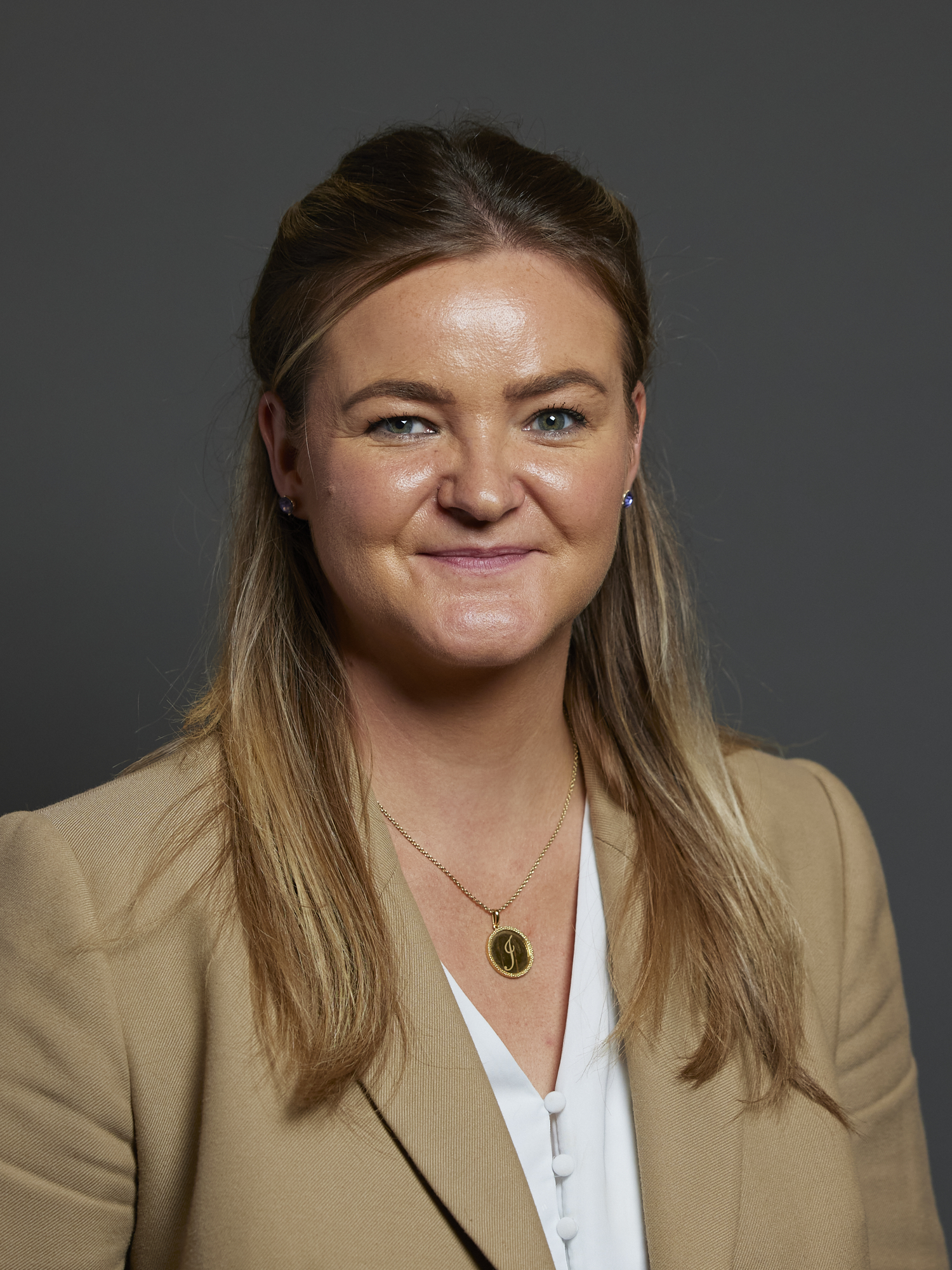
- Official portrait, 2024

Parliamentary Under-Secretary of State for Nature, Coasts and Rural Affairs
- Incumbent
- Assumed office 21 July 2026
- Prime Minister: Andy Burnham
- Preceded by: Mary Creagh (Nature); Stephen Morgan (Rural Affairs)

Member of Parliament for Suffolk Coastal
- Incumbent
- Assumed office 4 July 2024
- Preceded by: Thérèse Coffey
- Majority: 1,070 (2.2%)

Personal details
- Born: Jennifer Barbara Riddell; 11 August 1986 (age 40)
- Party: Labour
- Spouse: Matthew Riddell-Carpenter
- Education: SOAS University of London (BA, MA); University of Reading (MBA)
- Website: jennyforsuffolkcoastal.org

Jennifer Barbara Riddell-Carpenter (née Riddell; born 1986) is a British politician who has been the Member of Parliament for Suffolk Coastal since 2024. She has served as Parliamentary Under-Secretary of State for Nature, Coasts and Rural Affairs since 2026.

== Early life ==
After spending her early childhood abroad for her parents' work, the family moved to Martlesham Heath when Riddell-Carpenter was seven. She was privately educated at Woodbridge School, before going to Welbeck Defence Sixth Form College. She graduated with a Bachelor of Arts (BA) in history and politics in 2008 and a Master of Arts (MA) in Islamic history in 2009, both from SOAS University of London. She later claims to have completed a Master of Business Administration (MBA) at Henley Business School in 2017, although this has not been verified by the Business School.

She was managing director of Cratus Group, a PR agency, director of the Built Environment Communications Group, a manager at housing developer L&Q, and at other PR agencies like Four Communications and Bellenden, according to her LinkedIn page.

Riddell-Carpenter was an Army Reservist.

== Political career ==
As an MP, Riddell-Carpenter criticised proposed plans to build energy infrastructure to connect offshore wind power to the UK.

On 20 July 2026, Riddell-Carpenter was appointed Parliamentary Under-Secretary of State in the Department for Environment, Food and Rural Affairs under Andy Burnham.

In September 2026, during a fringe event at the 2026 Labour Party Conference, Riddell-Carpenter stated that, if the party did not set out its vision for rural Britain, the various debates surrounding the British countryside would be shaped by the far-right on the basis of a nostalgic vision "that never really existed. It'll be that warm ale, a black labrador by your feet in a pub that doesn't exist, and with symbolism of fox hunting all around them, it'll be a very far-Right nostalgic vision of Britain that we don't want to have, [and] never really existed." This invited considerable backlash, including commentators pointing out that Riddell-Carpenter had, in earlier years, posted pictures of her own black labrador on social media. Riddell-Carpenter later said that she did not think country pubs and black labradors were far-right indicators and that she was merely "talking about how rural life isn't always rosy".

== Personal life ==
Riddell-Carpenter is married to Matthew Riddell-Carpenter, who works in London social housing.
