= 2023 Mid Devon District Council election =

2023 English local election

- 4 May 2023

All 42 seats to Mid Devon District Council 22 seats needed for a majority

	First party	Second party
Leader	Luke Taylor	Clive Eginton
Party	Liberal Democrats	Conservative
Last election	12 seats, 29.6%	18 seats, 34.1%
Seats before	11	17
Seats after	33	5
Seat change	▲21	▼13
Popular vote	19,521	13,811
Percentage	46.9%	33.2%
Swing	▲17.3%	▼0.9%
	Third party	Fourth party
Leader	Elizabeth Lloyd
Party	Green	Independent
Last election	2 seats, 8.6%	10 seats, 13.9%
Seats before	2	12 (Note: Of the independent councillors prior to the election, eight formed the "Non-aligned group" led by Barry Warren.)
Seats after	3	1
Seat change	▲1	▼9
Popular vote	2,793	3,286
Percentage	6.7%	7.9%
Swing	▼1.9%	▼6.0%
- Winner of each seat at the 2023 Mid Devon District Council election
Leader before election
Barry Warren
Independent
No overall control
Leader after election
Luke Taylor
Liberal Democrats

The 2023 Mid Devon District Council election took place on 4 May 2023 to elect members of Mid Devon District Council in Devon, England. It was held on the same day as other local elections in the United Kingdom.

The Liberal Democrats took control of the council for the first time since 1999.

== Overview ==
Prior to the election the council was under no overall control, being run by a minority administration of some of the independent councillors, with independent Barry Warren serving as leader of the council.

New ward boundaries took effect for this election, following a review by the Local Government Boundary Commission for England. The number of seats stayed the same at 42, but the configuration of wards was changed to comprise five 3-member wards, ten 2-member wards and seven single member wards.

The election saw the Liberal Democrats win a majority of the seats on the council. The independents and Conservatives both lost significant numbers of seats: leader of the council Barry Warren lost his seat, as did the Conservative group leader Clive Eginton. Liberal Democrat group leader Luke Taylor was appointed leader of the council at the subsequent annual council meeting on 24 May 2023.

== Results summary ==
2023 Mid Devon District Council election
Party	Candidates	Seats	Gains	Losses	Net gain/loss	Seats %	Votes %	Votes	+/−
Liberal Democrats	36	33	21	0	▲21	78.6	46.9	19,521	+17.3
Conservative	40	5	0	13	▼13	11.9	33.2	13,811	–0.9
Green	8	3	1	0	▲1	7.1	6.7	2,793	–1.9
Independent	12	1	0	9	▼9	2.4	7.9	3,286	–6.0
Labour	12	0	0	0	Steady	0.0	5.3	2,213 (Note: Including 307 votes for a Labour Co-op candidate.)	–1.8
Reform	1	0	0	0	Steady	0.0	<0.1	19	N/A

== Ward results ==
Mid Devon District Council election results.

=== Bradninch ===
Bradninch
Party	Candidate	Votes	%	±%
Liberal Democrats	Luke Taylor*	650	82.2	N/A
Labour	Piers Kotting	92	11.6	N/A
Conservative	James Ruttledge	49	6.2	N/A
Majority		558	70.5	N/A
Turnout		793	48.5	N/A
Rejected ballots		2	0.3	
Registered electors		1,636		
Liberal Democrats win (new seat)				

=== Cadbury ===
Cadbury
Party	Candidate	Votes	%	±%
Conservative	Rhys Roberts	277	41.5	N/A
Liberal Democrats	Georgina Stone	163	24.4	N/A
Independent	Bob Deed*	137	20.5	N/A
Labour	Linda Luckhaus	71	10.6	N/A
Reform	Jennifer Riddle	19	2.8	N/A
Majority		114	17.1	N/A
Turnout		669	45.1	N/A
Rejected ballots		2	0.3	
Registered electors		1,485		
Conservative win (new seat)				

=== Canonsleigh ===
Canonsleigh (2 seats)
Party	Candidate	Votes	%	±%
Liberal Democrats	Jane Lock	786	67.9	N/A
Green	Gill Westcott	521	45.0	N/A
Conservative	Christine Collis*	375	32.4	N/A
Conservative	Paul Osman	333	28.8	N/A
Majority		146	12.6	N/A
Turnout		1,166	40.3	N/A
Rejected ballots		8	0.7	
Registered electors		2,893		
Liberal Democrats win (new seat)				
Green win (new seat)				

=== Clare & Shuttern ===
Clare & Shuttern (2 seats)
Party	Candidate	Votes	%	±%
Liberal Democrats	Chris Adcock	787	58.5	N/A
Liberal Democrats	Rachel Gilmour	732	54.4	N/A
Conservative	Isobel Grant	549	40.8	N/A
Conservative	Isla Farrington	493	36.7	N/A
Majority		183	13.6	N/A
Turnout		1,367	44.9	N/A
Rejected ballots		22	1.6	
Registered electors		3,046		
Liberal Democrats win (new seat)				
Liberal Democrats win (new seat)				

=== Crediton Boniface ===
Crediton Boniface (2 seats)
Party	Candidate	Votes	%	±%
Liberal Democrats	Jim Cairney*	497	57.4	N/A
Liberal Democrats	John Downes*	494	57.0	N/A
Independent	Steve Huxtable	215	24.8	N/A
Conservative	Gina Ford	194	22.4	N/A
Labour	John Humphreys	138	15.9	N/A
Majority		279	32.2	N/A
Turnout		870	27.5	N/A
Rejected ballots		4	0.5	
Registered electors		3,162		
Liberal Democrats win (new seat)				
Liberal Democrats win (new seat)				

=== Crediton Lawrence ===
Crediton Lawrence (2 seats)
Party	Candidate	Votes	%	±%
Liberal Democrats	Frank Letch*	611	58.9	N/A
Liberal Democrats	Guy Cochran	556	53.6	N/A
Labour Co-op	Laurie Laybourn	307	29.6	N/A
Conservative	Sam Scougall-Knight	254	24.5	N/A
Majority		249	24.0	N/A
Turnout		1,058	34.3	N/A
Rejected ballots		21	2.0	
Registered electors		3,088		
Liberal Democrats win (new seat)				
Liberal Democrats win (new seat)				

=== Cullompton Padbrook ===
Cullompton Padbrook (2 seats)
Party	Candidate	Votes	%	±%
Liberal Democrats	Lloyd Knight	457	55.4	N/A
Liberal Democrats	Sue Robinson	370	44.8	N/A
Conservative	John Berry*	345	41.8	N/A
Conservative	Susan Lane-Smith	263	31.9	N/A
Green	Anthony Humble-Smith	123	14.9	N/A
Majority		25	3.0	N/A
Turnout		828	27.6	N/A
Rejected ballots		3	0.4	
Registered electors		3,001		
Liberal Democrats win (new seat)				
Liberal Democrats win (new seat)				

=== Cullompton St Andrews ===
Cullompton St Andrews (3 seats)
Party	Candidate	Votes	%	±%
Liberal Democrats	Emma Buczkowski	636	59.7	N/A
Liberal Democrats	James Buczkowski*	634	59.5	N/A
Independent	Nikki Woollatt*	479	45.0	N/A
Conservative	Jane Attwood	322	30.2	N/A
Labour	Edward Southerden	226	21.2	N/A
Conservative	Martin Whatley	217	20.4	N/A
Conservative	Melvyn Hanks	205	19.2	N/A
Majority		157	14.7	N/A
Turnout		1,070	27.0	N/A
Rejected ballots		5	0.5	
Registered electors		3,959		
Liberal Democrats win (new seat)				
Liberal Democrats win (new seat)				
Independent win (new seat)				

=== Cullompton Vale ===
Cullompton Vale
Party	Candidate	Votes	%	±%
Liberal Democrats	Matt Fletcher	166	65.6	N/A
Conservative	Rosemary Berry	87	34.4	N/A
Majority		79	31.2	N/A
Turnout		253	31.8	N/A
Rejected ballots		0	0.0	
Registered electors		796		
Liberal Democrats win (new seat)				

=== Halberton ===
Halberton
Party	Candidate	Votes	%	±%
Liberal Democrats	Gwen DuChesne	360	60.3	N/A
Conservative	Raymond Radford*	236	39.5	N/A
Majority		124	20.8	N/A
Turnout		599	38.1	N/A
Rejected ballots		2	0.3	
Registered electors		1,574		
Liberal Democrats win (new seat)				

=== Lower Culm ===
Lower Culm (3 seats)
Party	Candidate	Votes	%	±%
Liberal Democrats	Andrea Glover	814	45.3	N/A
Liberal Democrats	Cathy Connor	722	40.2	N/A
Liberal Democrats	John Poynton	673	37.5	N/A
Conservative	Richard Chesterton*	649	36.1	N/A
Conservative	Brian Lane-Smith	461	25.7	N/A
Independent	Bob Evans*	434	24.2	N/A
Conservative	Lewis Worrow	419	23.3	N/A
Independent	Barry Warren*	403	22.4	N/A
Labour	John Bell	236	13.1	N/A
Majority		24	1.3	N/A
Turnout		1,799	33.3	N/A
Rejected ballots		3	0.2	
Registered electors		5,397		
Liberal Democrats win (new seat)				
Liberal Democrats win (new seat)				
Liberal Democrats win (new seat)				

=== Sandford & Creedy ===
Sandford & Creedy (2 seats)
Party	Candidate	Votes	%	±%
Green	Helen Tuffin	632	51.6	N/A
Green	Mark Jenkins	576	47.1	N/A
Conservative	Margaret Squires*	575	47.0	N/A
Conservative	Alex Monro	517	42.2	N/A
Majority		1	0.1	N/A
Turnout		1,238	43.6	N/A
Rejected ballots		14	1.1	
Registered electors		2,840		
Green win (new seat)				
Green win (new seat)				

=== Silverton ===
Silverton
Party	Candidate	Votes	%	±%
Liberal Democrats	Josh Wright*	500	85.8	N/A
Conservative	Jerry Brook	86	14.8	N/A
Majority		414	71.0	N/A
Turnout		585	37.9	N/A
Rejected ballots		2	0.3	
Registered electors		1,551		
Liberal Democrats win (new seat)				

=== Taw Vale ===
Taw Vale
Party	Candidate	Votes	%	±%
Liberal Democrats	Steve Keable	444	53.7	N/A
Conservative	Clive Eginton*	383	46.3	N/A
Majority		61	7.4	N/A
Turnout		835	48.5	N/A
Rejected ballots		8	1.0	
Registered electors		1,720		
Liberal Democrats win (new seat)				

=== Tiverton Castle ===
Tiverton Castle (2 seats)
Party	Candidate	Votes	%	±%
Liberal Democrats	Ben Holdman	553	55.6	N/A
Liberal Democrats	David Wulff	532	53.5	N/A
Conservative	Elizabeth Slade*	273	27.4	N/A
Conservative	Luis Gordon	265	26.6	N/A
Independent	Chris Berry	198	19.9	N/A
Majority		259	26.0	N/A
Turnout		1,009	30.1	N/A
Rejected ballots		14	1.4	
Registered electors		3,347		
Liberal Democrats win (new seat)				
Liberal Democrats win (new seat)				

=== Tiverton Cranmore ===
Tiverton Cranmore (3 seats)
Party	Candidate	Votes	%	±%
Liberal Democrats	Les Cruwys*	606	54.5	N/A
Liberal Democrats	Beckett Fish	463	41.6	N/A
Liberal Democrats	Lance Kennedy	445	40.0	N/A
Conservative	Sue Griggs*	346	31.1	N/A
Conservative	Guy Edwards	271	24.4	N/A
Independent	Chris Daw*	262	23.6	N/A
Independent	Steve Bush	229	20.6	N/A
Conservative	Nina Lindsay	202	18.2	N/A
Labour	Tom Ewings	109	9.8	N/A
Majority		99	8.9	N/A
Turnout		1,121	28.8	N/A
Rejected ballots		9	0.8	
Registered electors		3,571		
Liberal Democrats win (new seat)				
Liberal Democrats win (new seat)				
Liberal Democrats win (new seat)				

=== Tiverton Lowman ===
Tiverton Lowman (3 seats)
Party	Candidate	Votes	%	±%
Liberal Democrats	Andy Cuddy	574	50.9	N/A
Liberal Democrats	Gordon Czapiewski	455	40.4	N/A
Liberal Democrats	Matt Farrell	405	35.9	N/A
Conservative	Rebecca Clarke	360	31.9	N/A
Conservative	Neal Davey*	355	31.5	N/A
Conservative	Colin Slade*	313	27.8	N/A
Independent	Tim Bridger	250	22.2	N/A
Labour	Jason Chamberlain	245	21.7	N/A
Majority		45	4.0	N/A
Turnout		1,132	23.0	N/A
Rejected ballots		5	0.4	
Registered electors		4,912		
Liberal Democrats win (new seat)				
Liberal Democrats win (new seat)				
Liberal Democrats win (new seat)				

=== Tiverton Westexe ===
Tiverton Westexe (3 seats)
Party	Candidate	Votes	%	±%
Liberal Democrats	Dave Broom	494	40.7	N/A
Liberal Democrats	Jamie Frost	444	36.6	N/A
Conservative	Claudette Harrower	334	27.5	N/A
Conservative	Stephen Pugh*	287	23.7	N/A
Conservative	Richard Watson	277	22.8	N/A
Independent	Wally Burke*	273	22.5	N/A
Independent	Jason Lejeune	236	19.5	N/A
Labour	Alex Bingham	221	18.2	N/A
Green	Martin Atkinson	208	17.1	N/A
Independent	Steve Flaws	170	14.0	N/A
Green	Chris Musgrave	156	12.9	N/A
Majority		47	3.9	N/A
Turnout		1,225	25.3	N/A
Rejected ballots		12	1.0	
Registered electors		4,849		
Liberal Democrats win (new seat)				
Liberal Democrats win (new seat)				
Conservative win (new seat)				

=== Upper Culm ===
Upper Culm (2 seats)
Party	Candidate	Votes	%	±%
Liberal Democrats	Simon Clist*	814	60.8	N/A
Liberal Democrats	Natasha Bradshaw	807	60.3	N/A
Conservative	James Bartlett*	428	32.0	N/A
Conservative	Michael Cooper	366	27.3	N/A
Labour	Terence Edwards	127	9.5	N/A
Majority		379	28.3	N/A
Turnout		1,346	39.6	N/A
Rejected ballots		7	0.5	
Registered electors		3,397		
Liberal Democrats win (new seat)				
Liberal Democrats win (new seat)				

=== Upper Yeo & Taw ===
Upper Yeo & Taw (2 seats)
Party	Candidate	Votes	%	±%
Conservative	Stuart Penny*	591	47.8	N/A
Liberal Democrats	Natalia Letch	561	45.4	N/A
Conservative	Peter Heal*	524	42.4	N/A
Liberal Democrats	Andi Wyer*	382	30.9	N/A
Labour	Hayden Sharp	208	16.8	N/A
Majority		37	3.0	N/A
Turnout		1,246	38.3	N/A
Rejected ballots		9	0.7	
Registered electors		3,250		
Conservative win (new seat)				
Liberal Democrats win (new seat)				

=== Way ===
Way
Party	Candidate	Votes	%	±%
Conservative	Polly Colthorpe*	351	50.5	N/A
Green	Rosie Wibberley	344	49.5	N/A
Majority		7	1.0	N/A
Turnout		703	40.6	N/A
Rejected ballots		8	1.1	
Registered electors		1,730		
Conservative win (new seat)				

=== Yeo ===
Yeo (2 seats)
Party	Candidate	Votes	%	±%
Liberal Democrats	Sandy Chenore	553	43.3	N/A
Conservative	Martin Binks	490	38.4	N/A
Conservative	Angus Howie	489	38.3	N/A
Liberal Democrats	Paul Perriman	381	29.8	N/A
Labour	John Dean	233	18.2	N/A
Green	Danuta Karpinska	233	18.2	N/A
Majority		1	0.1	N/A
Turnout		1,281	43.4	N/A
Rejected ballots		4	0.3	
Registered electors		2,954		
Liberal Democrats win (new seat)				
Conservative win (new seat)				

== Changes 2023–2027 ==
- August 2023: Stuart Penny, elected as a Conservative for Upper Yeo & Taw, left the party to sit as an independent.
- By March 2024: Jamie Frost, elected as a Liberal Democrat for Tiverton Westexe, left the party to sit as an independent.
- April 2024: Claudette Harrower, elected as a Conservative for Tiverton Westexe, joined the Liberal Democrats.
- May 2026: Luke Taylor stood down as leader of the council and was succeeded by his deputy, Liberal Democrat David Wulff.
- June 2026: John Poynton, elected as a Liberal Democrat for Lower Culm, left the party to sit as an ungrouped councillor.

=== By-elections ===
==== Upper Yeo & Taw ====
The by-election was triggered by the resignation, for personal reasons, of Stuart Penny, who had been elected as a Conservative but was by then sitting as an independent.

Upper Yeo & Taw by-election, 7 March 2024
Party	Candidate	Votes	%	±%
Liberal Democrats	Alex White	405	52.2	+6.8
Conservative	Peter Heal	226	29.1	−18.7
Labour	Hayden Sharp	91	11.7	−5.1
Green	Mark Scotland	54	7.0	N/A
Majority		179	23.1	N/A
Turnout		781	24.2	−14.1
Rejected ballots		5	0.6	
Registered electors		3,229		
Liberal Democrats gain from Independent		Swing		

==== Tiverton Westexe ====
Independent councillor Jamie Frost, elected as a Liberal Democrat in 2023, was disqualified after failing to attend a council meeting for six consecutive months, causing this by-election.

Tiverton Westexe by-election, 20 June 2024
Party	Candidate	Votes	%	±%
Liberal Democrats	Adam Stirling	431	45.4	+4.7
Conservative	Paul Osman	248	26.1	−1.4
Independent	Jason Lejeune	182	19.2	−0.3
Green	Laura Buchanan	88	9.3	−7.8
Majority		183	19.3	N/A
Turnout		954	19.39	−5.9
Rejected ballots		5	0.5	
Registered electors		4,919		
Liberal Democrats gain from Independent		Swing		

==== Clare & Shuttern ====
Liberal Democrat councillor Rachel Gilmour, who had been elected as the Member of Parliament for Tiverton and Minehead in July 2024, stood down from the council, prompting this by-election.

Clare & Shuttern by-election, 1 May 2025
Party	Candidate	Votes	%	±%
Liberal Democrats	Martyn Stratton	664	50.0	−8.5
Conservative	Toby Gray	615	46.3	+5.5
Labour	Terence Edwards	48	3.6	N/A
Majority		49	3.7	N/A
Turnout		1,373	44.5	−0.4
Rejected ballots		45	3.3	
Registered electors		3,083		
Liberal Democrats hold		Swing		

==== Crediton Lawrence ====
The by-election was called following the death of Liberal Democrat councillor Frank Letch, the council's chairman, on 8 April 2025.

Crediton Lawrence by-election, 26 June 2025
Party	Candidate	Votes	%	±%
Liberal Democrats	Tim Stanford	540	64.9	+6.0
Reform	Andy Hankins	226	27.2	N/A
Labour	Terence Edwards	66	7.9	−21.7
Majority		314	37.7	N/A
Turnout		843	27.1	−7.2
Rejected ballots		11	1.3	
Registered electors		3,110		
Liberal Democrats hold		Swing		

==== Bradninch ====
Liberal Democrat councillor Luke Taylor, the former leader of the council, resigned in August 2026 after accepting a job transfer to the United States, triggering this by-election.

Bradninch by-election, 15 October 2026
Party	Candidate	Votes	%	±%
Liberal Democrats	Mary Ryan	476	72.6	−9.6
Reform	Liam O'Brien	91	13.9	N/A
Conservative	Dirk McFarlane-Aitken	37	5.6	−0.6
Labour	Piers Kotting	31	4.7	−6.9
Green	Kirsty MacKenzie	21	3.2	N/A
Majority		385	58.7	−11.8
Turnout		656	40.1	−8.4
Liberal Democrats hold		Swing		
