= Suffolk Coastal (constituency) =

UK Parliament constituency (since 1983)

Coordinates: 52.15°N 1.50°E

- County constituency for the House of Commons
- Interactive map of boundaries since 2024
- Location within the East of England
- County: Suffolk
- Electorate: 72,663 (March 2020)
- Major settlements: Felixstowe, Woodbridge, Saxmundham, Southwold and Aldeburgh

Current constituency
- Created: 1983
- Member of Parliament: Jenny Riddell-Carpenter (Labour)
- Seats: One
- Created from: Sudbury & Woodbridge, and Eye

Suffolk Coastal (sometimes known as Coastal Suffolk) is a parliamentary constituency in the county of Suffolk, England, (Note: A county constituency (for the purposes of election expenses and type of returning officer)) which has been represented in the House of Commons of the UK Parliament since 2024 by Jenny Riddell-Carpenter, a Labour Party Member of Parliament (MP).

== Constituency profile ==
Southwold

Suffolk Coastal is a constituency in Suffolk in the East of England. Its largest town is Felixstowe, which has a population of around 25,000. Other settlements include the towns of Woodbridge, Aldeburgh, Saxmundham, Leiston and Southwold and the villages of Trimley St Mary, Martlesham and Rendlesham.

This is a large, rural constituency along Suffolk's North Sea coast with many small market towns and villages. Felixstowe is a port town that was traditionally a small settlement until the opening of the Port of Felixstowe in 1875. This is the UK's largest container port and handles nearly half of the country's containerised trade. Woodbridge is also traditionally a port town with a history of boatbuilding and ropemaking. Aldeburgh and Southwold are small coastal towns, popular with tourists. The Sizewell nuclear power stations are located close to Leiston and are significant local employers. Woodbridge and its nearby villages are mostly affluent whilst Felixstowe and the rest of the constituency have average levels of wealth. House prices across the constituency are generally similar to the rest of the East of England and higher than the UK average.

Suffolk Coastal has low proportions of young and middle-aged adults and a large retired population; in 2024, 31% of residents were over the age of 65. Residents have average levels of income, child poverty and education and the homeownership rate is high. A high proportion of residents work in the transport, tourism and agriculture sectors, and the percentage claiming unemployment benefits is low. White people made up 96% of the population at the 2021 census.

At the local district council, the centre of Felixstowe is represented by the Labour Party, the town's suburbs, nearby villages and the Southwold area by Liberal Democrats, and Leiston and Aldeburgh by Green Party councillors. At the county council, which held elections more recently (in 2026), most seats in the constituency were won by Reform UK. An estimated 54% of voters in Suffolk Coastal supported leaving the European Union in the 2016 referendum, marginally higher than the UK-wide figure of 52%.

== History ==
This East Anglian constituency was created for the 1983 general election from eastern parts of the abolished county constituencies of Eye, and Sudbury and Woodbridge, including the towns of Felixstowe and Woodbridge. Its initial boundaries were coterminous with the recently created District of Suffolk Coastal.

The current constituency area includes three former borough constituencies which sent their own MPs to Parliament until abolished as 'rotten boroughs' by the Reform Act 1832 – Aldeburgh, Dunwich and Orford.

The seat was held from its creation until the 2010 election by the Conservative John Gummer who had previously represented the former seat of Eye from 1979. He was the Secretary of State for the Environment for four years during the second Major ministry and before that was for four years the Minister of State for Agriculture, Fisheries and Food. He stood down in 2010 and was elevated to the House of Lords as Lord Deben.

The MP between 2010 and 2024 was Conservative Thérèse Coffey, who served in the Sunak ministry as the Secretary of State for Environment, Food and Rural Affairs. She also previously served as Secretary of State for Work and Pensions between 2019 and 2022, and as the Deputy Prime Minister and Secretary of State for Health and Social Care during the short-lived Truss ministry from September to October 2022.

However, the Conservatives would lose the seat in the 2024 general election, with Labour's Jenny Riddell-Carpenter being voted in as the MP, with a majority of just over 1,000.

== Boundaries and boundary changes ==
=== Historic ===
==== 1983–1997 ====
- The District of Suffolk Coastal.

==== 1997–2010 ====
- The District of Suffolk Coastal wards of Aldeburgh, Alderton and Sutton, Bramfield and Cratfield, Buxlow, Felixstowe Central, Felixstowe East, Felixstowe North, Felixstowe South, Felixstowe South East, Felixstowe West, Hollesley, Kelsale, Kirton, Leiston, Martlesham, Melton, Nacton, Orford, Saxmundham, Snape, Trimleys, Tunstall, Ufford, Walberswick, Westleton, Woodbridge Centre, Woodbridge Farlingaye, Woodbridge Kyson, Woodbridge Riverside, Woodbridge Seckford, and Yoxford; and
- The District of Waveney wards of Blything, Halesworth, and Southwold.

Westernmost areas included in the new constituency of Central Suffolk and North Ipswich. Extended northwards to include three wards from the District of Waveney, transferred from the constituency of Waveney.

Map of boundaries 2010–2024

==== 2010–2024 ====
- The District of Suffolk Coastal wards of Aldeburgh, Farlingaye, Felixstowe East, Felixstowe North, Felixstowe South, Felixstowe South East, Felixstowe West, Hollesley with Eyke, Kyson, Leiston, Martlesham, Melton and Ufford, Nacton, Orford and Tunstall, Peasenhall, Rendlesham, Riverside, Saxmundham, Seckford, Snape, Sutton, Trimleys with Kirton, Walberswick and Wenhaston, and Yoxford; and
- The District of Waveney wards of Blything, Halesworth, Southwold and Reydon, and Wrentham.

Marginal changes due to revision of local authority wards.

NB on 1 April 2019, the District of Suffolk Coastal was abolished and absorbed into the newly established District of East Suffolk.

=== Current ===
Further to the 2023 review of Westminster constituencies, which came into effect for the 2024 general election, the composition of the constituency is as follows (as they existed on 1 December 2020):

- The District of East Suffolk wards of: Aldeburgh & Leiston; Deben; Eastern Felixstowe; Kelsale & Yoxford; Martlesham & Purdis Farm; Melton; Orwell & Villages; Rendlesham & Orford; Saxmundham; Southwold; Western Felixstowe; Woodbridge; Wrentham, Wangford & Westleton.

Largely unchanged, except the transfer of Halesworth to the newly created constituency of Waveney Valley.

== Members of Parliament ==
Sudbury & Woodbridge and Eye prior to 1983

| Election | Member | Party |
|---|---|---|
| 1983 | John Gummer | Conservative |
| 2010 | Thérèse Coffey | Conservative |
| 2024 | Jenny Riddell-Carpenter | Labour |

== Elections ==
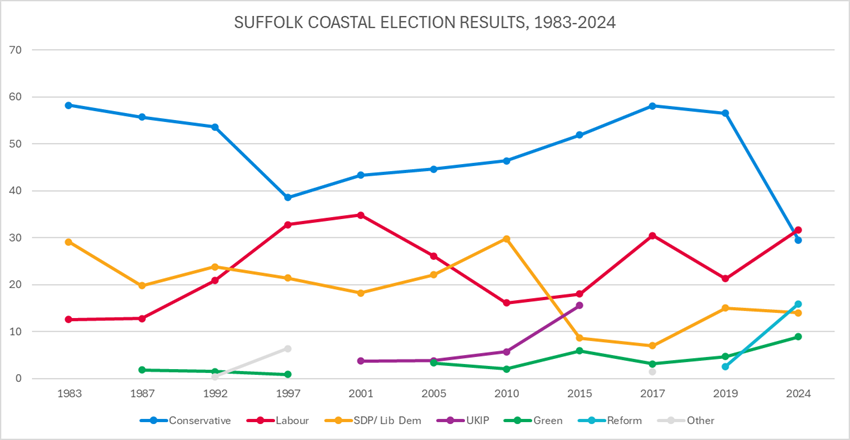
Election results 1983–2024

=== Elections in the 2020s ===
General election 2024: Suffolk Coastal
| Party | Candidate | Votes | % | ±% |
|---|---|---|---|---|
| Labour | Jenny Riddell-Carpenter | 15,672 | 31.7 | +10.3 |
| Conservative | Thérèse Coffey | 14,602 | 29.5 | −26.9 |
| Reform | Matthew Jackson | 7,850 | 15.9 | New |
| Liberal Democrats | Julia Ewart | 6,947 | 14.0 | −1.1 |
| Green | Julian Cusack | 4,380 | 8.9 | +4.5 |
| Majority | | 1,070 | 2.2 | N/A |
| Turnout | | 49,451 | 66.4 | −5.7 |
| Registered electors | | 74,522 | | |
| Labour gain from Conservative | | Swing | +18.7 | |

=== Elections in the 2010s ===
2019 notional result
| Party | Vote | % |
|---|---|---|
| Conservative | 29,558 | 56.4 |
| Labour | 11,203 | 21.4 |
| Liberal Democrats | 7,921 | 15.1 |
| Green | 2,308 | 4.4 |
| Others | 1,375 | 2.6 |
| Turnout | 53,365 | 72.1 |
| Electorate | 72,663 | |

General election 2019: Suffolk Coastal
| Party | Candidate | Votes | % | ±% |
|---|---|---|---|---|
| Conservative | Thérèse Coffey | 32,958 | 56.5 | −1.6 |
| Labour | Cameron Matthews | 12,425 | 21.3 | −9.2 |
| Liberal Democrats | Julia Ewart | 8,719 | 15.0 | +8.0 |
| Green | Rachel Smith-Lyte | 2,713 | 4.7 | +1.6 |
| Independent | Tony Love | 1,493 | 2.6 | New |
| Majority | | 20,533 | 35.2 | +7.6 |
| Turnout | | 58,308 | 71.2 | −2.0 |
| Conservative hold | | Swing | +3.9 | |

Tony Love was originally standing as the Brexit Party candidate for this constituency.

General election 2017: Suffolk Coastal
| Party | Candidate | Votes | % | ±% |
|---|---|---|---|---|
| Conservative | Thérèse Coffey | 33,713 | 58.1 | +6.2 |
| Labour | Cameron Matthews | 17,701 | 30.5 | +12.5 |
| Liberal Democrats | James Sandbach | 4,048 | 7.0 | −1.6 |
| Green | Eamonn O'Nolan | 1,802 | 3.1 | −2.8 |
| Independent | Philip Young | 810 | 1.4 | New |
| Majority | | 16,012 | 27.6 | −6.3 |
| Turnout | | 58,074 | 73.2 | +2.6 |
| Conservative hold | | Swing | -3.2 | |

General election 2015: Suffolk Coastal
| Party | Candidate | Votes | % | ±% |
|---|---|---|---|---|
| Conservative | Thérèse Coffey | 28,855 | 51.9 | +5.5 |
| Labour | Russell Whiting | 10,013 | 18.0 | +1.9 |
| UKIP | Daryll Pitcher | 8,655 | 15.6 | +9.9 |
| Liberal Democrats | James Sandbach | 4,777 | 8.6 | −21.2 |
| Green | Rachel Smith-Lyte | 3,294 | 5.9 | +3.9 |
| Majority | | 18,842 | 33.9 | +17.3 |
| Turnout | | 55,594 | 70.6 | −0.6 |
| Conservative hold | | Swing | +1.8 | |

General election 2010: Suffolk Coastal
| Party | Candidate | Votes | % | ±% |
|---|---|---|---|---|
| Conservative | Thérèse Coffey | 25,475 | 46.4 | +1.8 |
| Liberal Democrats | Daisy Cooper | 16,347 | 29.8 | +7.7 |
| Labour | Adam Leeder | 8,812 | 16.1 | −10.1 |
| UKIP | Stephen Bush | 3,156 | 5.7 | +1.9 |
| Green | Rachel Fulcher | 1,103 | 2.0 | −1.3 |
| Majority | | 9,128 | 16.6 | −1.8 |
| Turnout | | 54,893 | 71.2 | +3.9 |
| Conservative hold | | Swing | −2.9 | |

=== Elections in the 2000s ===
General election 2005: Suffolk Coastal
| Party | Candidate | Votes | % | ±% |
|---|---|---|---|---|
| Conservative | John Gummer | 23,415 | 44.6 | +1.3 |
| Labour | David Rowe | 13,730 | 26.1 | −8.7 |
| Liberal Democrats | David Young | 11,637 | 22.1 | +3.9 |
| UKIP | Richard Curtis | 2,020 | 3.8 | +0.1 |
| Green | Paul Whitlow | 1,755 | 3.3 | New |
| Majority | | 9,685 | 18.5 | +10.0 |
| Turnout | | 52,557 | 67.9 | +2.3 |
| Conservative hold | | Swing | +5.0 | |

General election 2001: Suffolk Coastal
| Party | Candidate | Votes | % | ±% |
|---|---|---|---|---|
| Conservative | John Gummer | 21,847 | 43.3 | +4.7 |
| Labour | Nigel Gardner | 17,521 | 34.8 | +2.0 |
| Liberal Democrats | Tony Schur | 9,192 | 18.2 | −3.2 |
| UKIP | Michael Burn | 1,847 | 3.7 | New |
| Majority | | 4,326 | 8.5 | +2.7 |
| Turnout | | 50,407 | 65.6 | −10.2 |
| Conservative hold | | Swing | +1.4 | |

=== Elections in the 1990s ===
General election 1997: Suffolk Coastal
| Party | Candidate | Votes | % | ±% |
|---|---|---|---|---|
| Conservative | John Gummer | 21,696 | 38.6 | −15.0 |
| Labour | Mark Campbell | 18,442 | 32.8 | +9.0 |
| Liberal Democrats | Alexandra Jones | 12,036 | 21.4 | −2.4 |
| Referendum | Stephen Caulfield | 3,416 | 6.1 | New |
| Green | Anthony Slade | 514 | 0.9 | −0.6 |
| Natural Law | Felicity Kaplan | 152 | 0.3 | −0.1 |
| Majority | | 3,254 | 5.8 | −24.0 |
| Turnout | | 56,256 | 75.8 | −5.8 |
| Conservative hold | | Swing | −12.0 | |

General election 1992: Suffolk Coastal
| Party | Candidate | Votes | % | ±% |
|---|---|---|---|---|
| Conservative | John Gummer | 34,680 | 53.6 | −2.1 |
| Liberal Democrats | Peter Monk | 15,395 | 23.8 | −6.0 |
| Labour | Terence Hodgson | 13,508 | 20.9 | +8.1 |
| Green | Anthony Slade | 943 | 1.5 | −0.3 |
| Natural Law | Felicity Kaplan | 232 | 0.4 | New |
| Majority | | 19,285 | 29.8 | +3.9 |
| Turnout | | 64,758 | 81.6 | +3.7 |
| Conservative hold | | Swing | +1.9 | |

=== Elections in the 1980s ===
General election 1987: Suffolk Coastal
| Party | Candidate | Votes | % | ±% |
|---|---|---|---|---|
| Conservative | John Gummer | 32,834 | 55.7 | −2.5 |
| SDP | Joan Miller | 17,554 | 29.8 | +0.7 |
| Labour | Susan Reeves | 7,534 | 12.8 | +0.2 |
| Green | James Holloway | 1,049 | 1.8 | New |
| Majority | | 15,280 | 25.9 | −3.2 |
| Turnout | | 58,971 | 77.9 | +2.9 |
| Conservative hold | | Swing | | |

General election 1983: Suffolk Coastal
| Party | Candidate | Votes | % | ±% |
|---|---|---|---|---|
| Conservative | John Gummer | 31,240 | 58.2 | |
| SDP | David Houseley | 15,618 | 29.1 | |
| Labour | Denis Ballantyne | 6,780 | 12.6 | |
| Majority | | 15,622 | 29.1 | |
| Turnout | | 53,638 | 75.0 | |
| Conservative win (new seat) | | | | |

== See also ==
- List of parliamentary constituencies in Suffolk
- List of parliamentary constituencies in the East of England (region)
