= David Wrench (rugby union) =

British rugby union player and politician (1936-2018)

- Born: Frederick David Bryan Wrench; 27 November 1936 Winsford, Cheshire, England
- Died: 18 June 2018 (aged 81) Durston, Somerset, England
- Notable relative: Rachel Wrench (daughter)

Rugby union career
Senior career
Years	Team	Apps	(Points)
–	Harlequins		
International career
Years	Team	Apps	(Points)
1964	England		

Frederick David Bryan Wrench (27 November 1936–18 June 2018) was a British rugby union player and politician.

== Early life and education ==
Wrench was born in Winsford, Cheshire on 27 November 1936, the youngest of three brothers. He won a scholarship to attend Sandbach School. He went on to study chemistry at the University of Leeds before taking an MA in education at the University of Cambridge.

== Rugby union ==
Having excelled in sport at his time at Sandbach, by the time Wrench was 17 he was playing for Wilmslow. His preferred position was tighthead prop. He won a rugby blue at Cambridge and went on to play for Harlequins, where he captained the team for a season, and Northampton. In 1964, Wrench made the first of two appearances for the England national rugby union team, and also represented the Barbarians.

== Career ==
Wrench worked at Procter & Gamble and was a teacher at Haberdashers' Aske's School before moving to teach at Taunton School in 1970, and finally the King's School Worcester in 1990.

Wrench was a councillor until 1992, sitting on Somerset County Council and Taunton Deane Borough Council. He was chairman of Wellington Town Council, twinning the town with Immenstadt in Germany.

He then retired with his wife to Durston in Somerset, where he was an active member of the Conservative Party. He was chairman of North Curry until he stood down due to ill health.

== Personal life ==
Wrench was married and had four children. His daughter Rachel Gilmour was elected Liberal Democrat Member of Parliament (MP) for Tiverton and Minehead in the 2024 United Kingdom general election.

Wrench died in June 2018.

== See also ==
- List of England national rugby union players
