= Thérèse Coffey =

Deputy Prime Minister of the United Kingdom in 2022

The Right Honourable The Baroness Coffey DBE PC
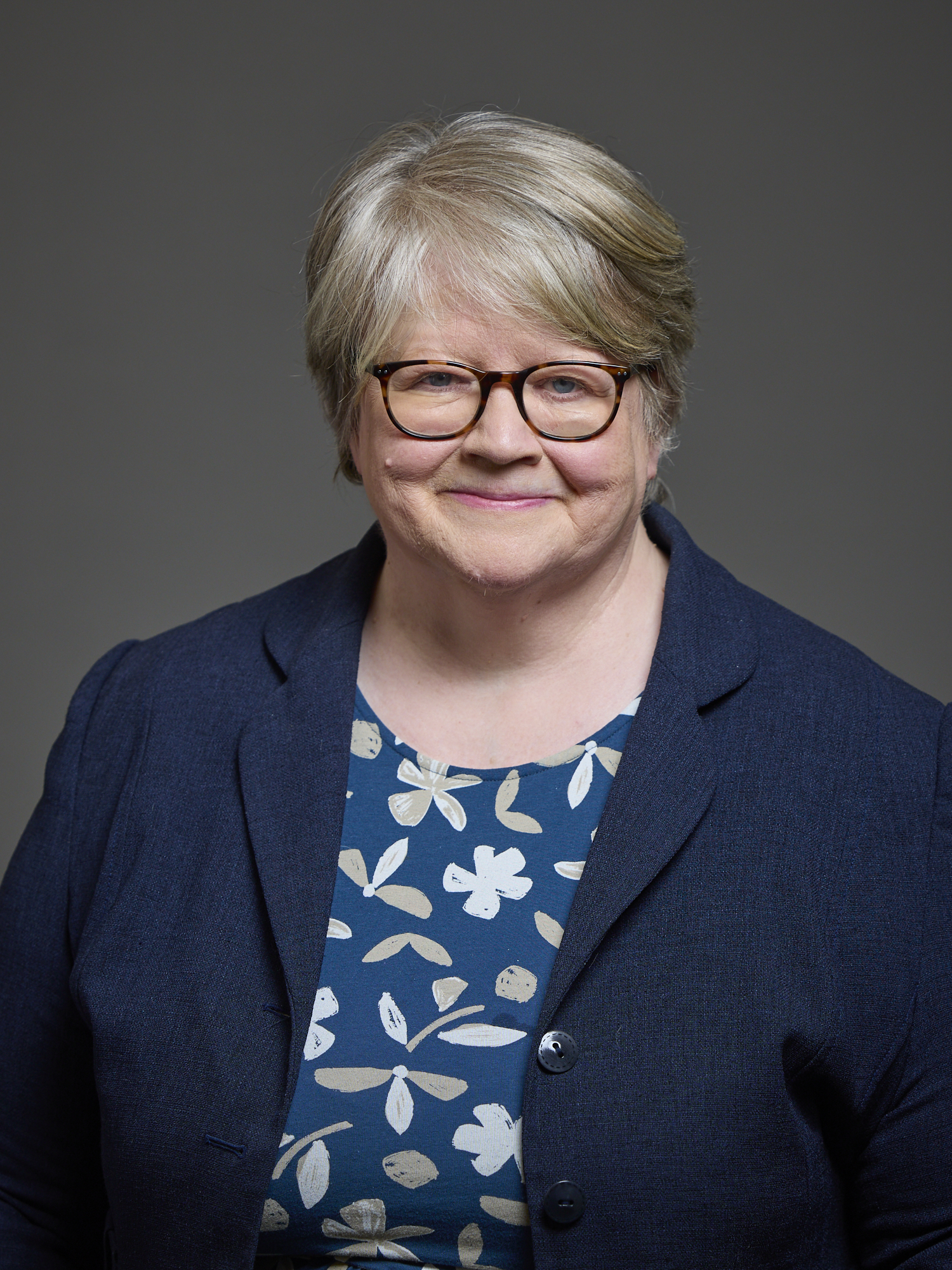
- Official portrait, 2026

Deputy Prime Minister of the United Kingdom
- In office 6 September 2022 – 25 October 2022
- Monarchs: Elizabeth II; Charles III
- Prime Minister: Liz Truss
- Preceded by: Dominic Raab
- Succeeded by: Dominic Raab
Cabinet offices 2019–2023
Secretary of State for Environment, Food and Rural Affairs
In office 25 October 2022 – 13 November 2023
Prime Minister	Rishi Sunak
Preceded by	Ranil Jayawardena
Succeeded by	Steve Barclay
Secretary of State for Health and Social Care
In office 6 September 2022 – 25 October 2022
Prime Minister	Liz Truss
Preceded by	Steve Barclay
Succeeded by	Steve Barclay
Secretary of State for Work and Pensions
In office 8 September 2019 – 6 September 2022
Prime Minister	Boris Johnson
Preceded by	Amber Rudd
Succeeded by	Chloe Smith
Junior ministerial offices 2014–2019
Minister of State for Environment and Rural Opportunity (Note: As Parliamentary Under-Secretary of State from 2016 to July 2019.)
In office 17 July 2016 – 8 September 2019
Prime Minister	Theresa May; Boris Johnson
Preceded by	Rory Stewart
Succeeded by	Rebecca Pow
Deputy Leader of the House of Commons
In office 11 May 2015 – 17 July 2016
Prime Minister	David Cameron; Theresa May
Preceded by	Tom Brake
Succeeded by	Michael Ellis
Assistant Government Whip
In office 15 July 2014 – 8 May 2015
Prime Minister	David Cameron
Preceded by	Amber Rudd
Succeeded by	Simon Kirby

Member of the House of Lords
- Lord Temporal
- Life peerage 17 January 2025

Member of Parliament for Suffolk Coastal
- In office 6 May 2010 – 30 May 2024
- Preceded by: John Gummer
- Succeeded by: Jenny Riddell-Carpenter

Personal details
- Born: Thérèse Anne Coffey (Note: The two diacritics in "Thérèse" do not appear in the self-written Who's Who, but they are used on Coffey's personal website and Hansard also uses them.); 18 November 1971 (age 54) Wigan, Lancashire, England
- Party: Conservative
- Education: Somerville College, Oxford (did not graduate); University College London (BSc, PhD)
- Website: theresecoffey.co.uk
- Scientific career
- Fields: Inorganic chemistry; organometallic chemistry
- Thesis: Structural and Reactivity Studies of Bis(imido) Complexes of Molybdenum (1998)
- Doctoral advisor: Graeme Hogarth

Thérèse Anne Coffey, Baroness Coffey (born 18 November 1971) is a British politician who served as Deputy Prime Minister of the United Kingdom from September to October 2022 under Liz Truss.

A member of the Conservative Party, she was the first female deputy prime minister in British history. Coffey served as Environment Secretary, Health Secretary, and Work and Pensions Secretary while serving as the member of Parliament (MP) for Suffolk Coastal from 2010 to 2024. Since 2025, she has been a Member of the House of Lords as a life peer.

Coffey served under Prime Minister Theresa May as a parliamentary under-secretary of state at the Department for Environment, Food and Rural Affairs from 2016 to 2019, before serving under Prime Minister Boris Johnson as a minister of state at the same department from July to September 2019. In September 2019, after Amber Rudd resigned from Johnson's cabinet, Coffey was appointed as secretary of state for work and pensions.

After Johnson resigned in 2022, Coffey supported Liz Truss's bid to become Conservative leader. Following Truss's appointment as prime minister in September 2022, Coffey was appointed deputy prime minister and secretary of state for health and social care. After Truss resigned in October 2022, Coffey was appointed by Rishi Sunak as secretary of state for environment, food and rural affairs. After resigning in November 2023, Coffey lost her seat in Parliament at the 2024 general election but was appointed to the House of Lords later that year.

== Education and early life ==
Thérèse Coffey was born on 18 November 1971 in Billinge Hospital in Wigan, Lancashire, to Tom Coffey and Alice George and grew up in Liverpool. She went to St Mary's College, Crosby, and St Edward's College, Liverpool. Coffey then briefly attended the University of Oxford as an undergraduate student of Somerville College, Oxford in 1989 to study chemistry. However, in 1991 she was asked to withdraw having obtained poor college examination results twice allegedly due to spending too much time on extracurricular activities including rowing and politics.

Coffey then attended University College London, where she obtained a Bachelor of Science degree (with upper second class honours) in chemistry in 1993 and later a PhD in chemistry in 1998.

== Career ==
After graduating Coffey worked in a number of roles for Mars Incorporated, including as finance director for Mars Drinks UK. She then worked for the BBC as a property finance manager.

=== Political career ===
In the European Parliament elections in June 2004, Coffey stood for election to the European Parliament for South East England. The Conservative Party won 35.2% of the vote, giving it four seats, but Coffey was seventh on the list in this proportional representation system, and was not elected.

Coffey stood as the Conservative Party candidate for Wrexham at the 2005 general election, coming third with 20% of the vote.

At the 2009 European Parliament elections, Coffey missed out by one place on being elected to the European Parliament for South East England. The Conservative Party won 34.79% of the vote, giving it four seats, and placing her fifth on the party list.

== Parliamentary career ==
At the 2010 general election, Coffey was elected as MP for Suffolk Coastal with 46.4% of the vote and a majority of 9,128. She is a supporter of the Free Enterprise Group.

On 6 July 2011, Coffey defended Rebekah Brooks over the News of the World's involvement in the news media phone hacking scandal. She said a "witch hunt" was developing against Brooks, and that simply to say Brooks was editor of the newspaper at the time was not enough evidence against her. Coffey became a member of the Culture, Media and Sport Select Committee inquiry into the hacking scandal in 2012. In that committee, she declined to support any motions critical of Rupert and James Murdoch. However, she later joined the majority of her party in voting for exemplary damages to be a default consequence to deter press misbehaviour.

=== Early frontbench career ===
After serving as a member of the Culture, Media and Sport Committee from July 2010 to October 2012, Coffey was appointed Parliamentary Private Secretary to Michael Fallon, Minister for Business and Energy.

Coffey faced criticism in 2011 from some Suffolk residents over her support for the government's proposal to sell off forestry and woodland in public ownership. Protesters argued that "experience shows us that when private landowners come in they close car parks and make access as difficult as possible". The government later dropped the proposal in January 2013.

Coffey's decision to write a paper for the Free Enterprise Group recommending pensioners should pay National Insurance contributions on earnings provoked criticism among some older constituents, who claimed that in an already tough economic environment, it was wrong to tax pensioners further. Coffey said that she had "no regrets writing about National Insurance" and that it was "a policy proposal – it is by no means, at this stage, anymore than that".

In February 2013, Coffey voted against the legalisation of same-sex marriage, stating: "I shall be voting against the Bill because my perspective on what marriage is really about is different from that of some other Members... for me it is fundamentally still about family, the bedrock of society." She again voted against same-sex marriage in 2019 when Parliament considered the same question for Northern Ireland.

In July 2014, she was appointed an assistant government whip.

At the 2015 general election, Coffey was re-elected as MP for Suffolk Coastal with an increased vote share of 51.9% and an increased majority of 18,842. After the election, she was appointed Deputy Leader of the House of Commons on 11 May 2015.

In October 2016, Coffey was criticised by the then Liberal Democrat leader Tim Farron for accepting hospitality worth £890 from Ladbrokes after supporting the gambling industry in parliament as part of the Culture, Media and Sport Committee; she denied that she had been "influenced in her considerations on matters of related policy by any hospitality received".

Coffey voted in favour of a UK referendum on EU membership and consistently voted to proceed with the Brexit process, although she backed the Remain campaign during the referendum.

At the snap 2017 general election, Coffey was again re-elected, with an increased vote share of 58.1% and a decreased majority of 16,012.

In the House of Commons she sat on the Environmental Audit Committee from September 2017 to November 2019, ex-officio due to her ministerial role.

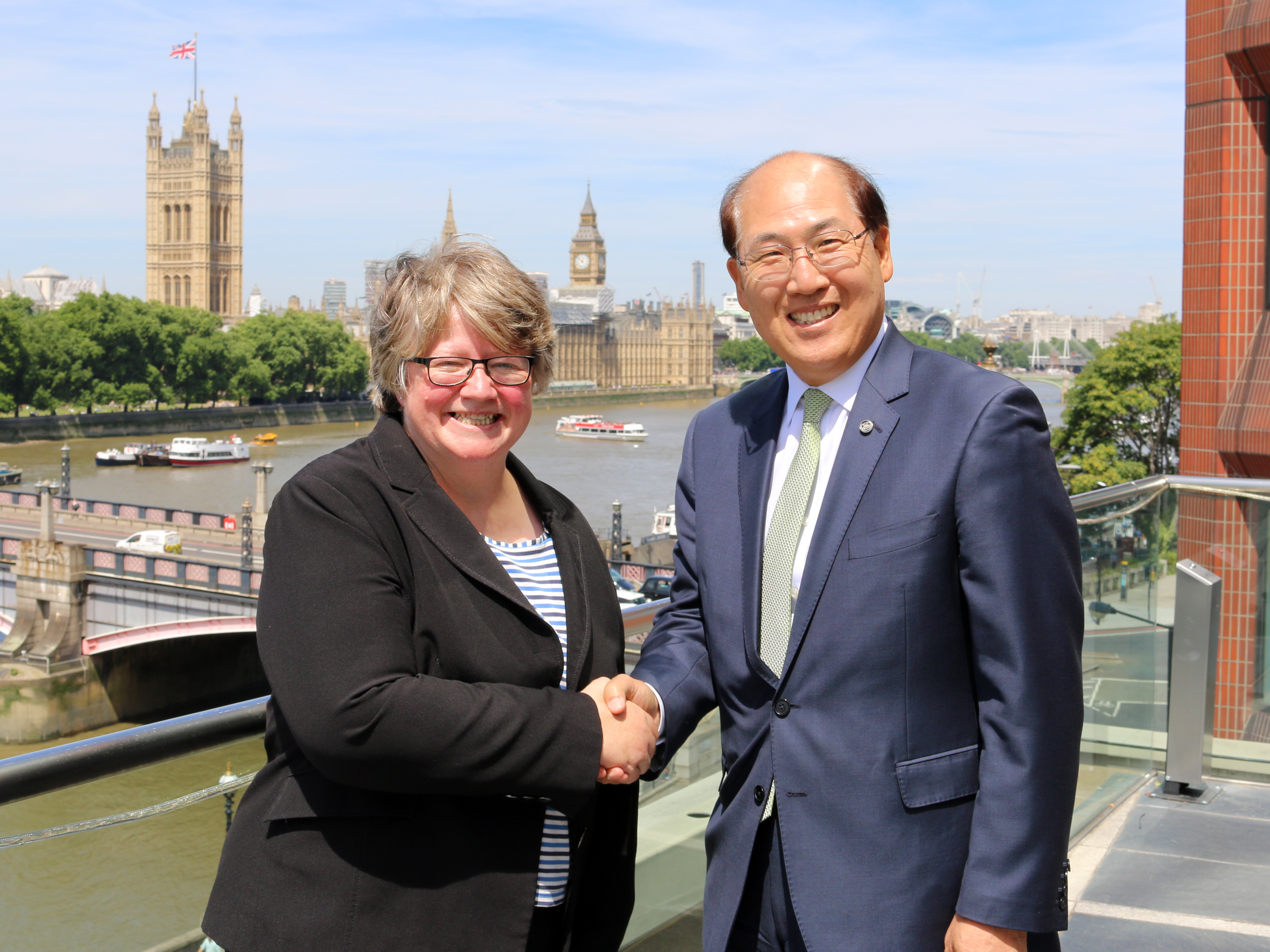
Coffey with Kitack Lim in 2017

=== Secretary of State for Work and Pensions ===
Following the resignation of Amber Rudd in September 2019, Coffey joined the Cabinet as Secretary of State for Work and Pensions. She retained her position in Prime Minister Boris Johnson's February 2020 cabinet reshuffle.

Coffey was again re-elected at the 2019 general election, with a decreased vote share of 56.5% and an increased majority of 20,533.

In June 2020, Coffey responded to Marcus Rashford's campaign for free school meals for children during the COVID-19 pandemic, which included a tweet from Rashford urging the government to remember Britain's poorest families. One of his tweets read, in part: "When you wake up this morning and run your shower, take a second to think about parents who have had their water turned off during lockdown." Coffey's response to his campaign was, "Water cannot be disconnected though", which he considered dismissive.

In September 2021, Coffey was accused by opponents of miscalculating the amount of work a Universal Credit claimant would need to do in order to make up for the proposed end of the £20-a-week increase in benefits, brought in to assist people during the COVID-19 pandemic. Speaking to BBC Breakfast, Coffey said: "We're conscious that £20 a week is about two hours' extra work every week – we will be seeing what we can do to help people perhaps secure those extra hours, but ideally also to make sure they're also in a place to get better paid jobs, as well." However, given Universal Credit's "taper rate" of 63%, a Universal Credit claimant sees their credit reduced by 63p for every pound they generate from work.

In January 2022, Coffey tweeted support for Boris Johnson in regard to Partygate allegations, stating that she considered his apology to be sincere.

In June 2022, Coffey said that, as a practising Catholic, she opposed abortion but did not condemn those who have an abortion. She had previously tabled a motion in 2010 calling for mental health assessments for those seeking abortion, and she also voted against extending abortion rights to people in Northern Ireland. Her views on abortion were criticised by Clare Murphy, CEO of the British Pregnancy Advisory Service.

Coffey continued to defend Johnson in July 2022 when he was accused of overlooking MP Chris Pincher's alleged sexual misconduct when he was appointed Deputy Chief Whip. Coffey went on record to say that Johnson was "not aware" of "specific" allegations relating to Pincher. She went on to say in several interviews that she felt Johnson had dealt with the issue decisively.

Coffey was campaign manager for Liz Truss in the parliamentary stages of the July–September 2022 Conservative Party leadership election, and she remained in a campaign role in the members' vote stage of the election.

=== Deputy prime minister and health secretary ===
Truss appointed Coffey as deputy prime minister and health and social care secretary in her new government on 6 September 2022. Her appointment made her the first woman to serve as deputy prime minister. In September 2022, Coffey identified four priorities for the Department of Health "A, B, C, D" – ambulances, backlog, care, and doctors and dentists.

Asked about nurses leaving to go abroad, Coffey said: "It is their choice of course if they want to do that, but then we also have an open route for people to come into this country who are professional staff". These comments came following a minimum estimated 38,000 nurse shortage; the number of nurses leaving the NHS in London had risen by 24% the past year and more than two-thirds of NHS trusts were reporting a "significant or severe impact" from staff leaving for better paid jobs in retail and hospitality.

On 15 October 2022, it was reported Coffey was planning to allow people to obtain antibiotics from pharmacists without a prescription from a general practitioner, which led to criticism by medical experts due to it increasing the risk of antimicrobial resistance (AMR). At the same time, she received criticism for admitting to giving her own supply of antibiotics to others, which also increases the risk of AMR. This act – of sharing an antibiotics prescription with others – was also described as being illegal.

On 18 October 2022, Dan Poulter – a psychiatrist and former Conservative health minister – criticised Coffey's failure to tackle smoking and obesity, saying it leads to worse health and strains the NHS. After entering the House of Commons in 2010 Coffey repeatedly voted against measures to restrict smoking, including the ban on smoking in enclosed public spaces and the requirement that cigarettes be sold in plain packaging. In May 2011, Coffey had accepted £1,100 in hospitality and gifts from Gallaher Group tobacco firm.

=== Secretary of State for Environment, Food and Rural Affairs ===
Following Rishi Sunak's appointment as prime minister, Coffey was retained in Sunak's cabinet and appointed secretary of state for environment, food and rural affairs on 25 October 2022, but lost her position as deputy prime minister. She had previously held the positions of parliamentary under-secretary of state and minister of state for environment and rural opportunity within the Department for Environment, Food and Rural Affairs.

On 23 February 2023, Coffey was criticised for suggesting people struggling to afford food could work for more hours to buy food, as well as suggesting that people eat turnips instead of tomatoes during a shortage of salad vegetables in the UK. Labour MP Rachael Maskell said, "It's very shocking that the Environment Secretary shifted blame for food poverty onto people because they are on low wages and are poor." Coffey acknowledged that inflation was "really tough at the moment" and that support schemes were in place.

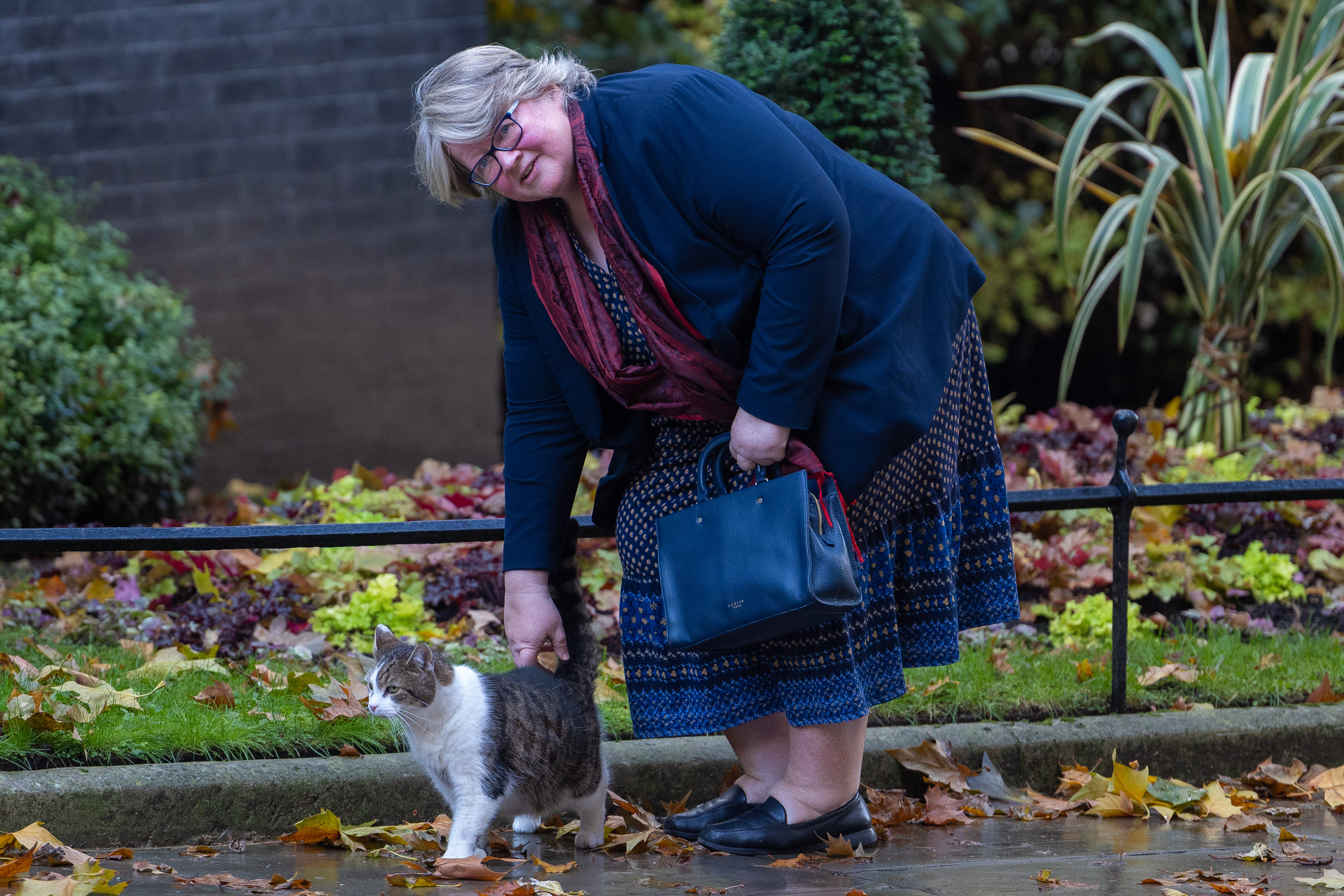
Coffey in Downing Street, with Larry the cat, on her way to submit her resignation on 13 November 2023

She resigned from the role on 13 November 2023 during a cabinet reshuffle, stating "I consider it is now the right time to step back from government". In a BBC Radio interview on 15 November, Coffey cited work-related stress as a reason for her resignation, stating that she had "nearly died" after becoming ill because of the stress of being a minister five years previously.

At the general election on 4 July 2024, Coffey lost her seat in parliament.

=== House of Lords ===
Coffey was nominated for a life peerage by Conservative leader Kemi Badenoch in late 2024. She was created Baroness Coffey, of Saxmundham in the County of Suffolk and of Grassendale in the City of Liverpool, on 17 January 2025, and was introduced to the House of Lords on 21 January.

In September 2026, in the House of Lords, Coffey said that the "pension triple lock" should be reviewed and that it should "probably" be scrapped and changed into a "double lock" or different system.

== Personal life ==
Coffey is single and is described as a private person. Coffey employed her sister Clare as a secretary in her parliamentary office starting in 2015.

Coffey is an avid football fan, supporting Liverpool Football Club. She signed an early day motion in 2011, set down by Labour Liverpool Walton MP Steve Rotheram, requesting a knighthood for Kenny Dalglish. She enjoys gardening, karaoke, and music.

In an interview with The Sunday Times, Coffey said she spent a month in hospital in 2018 after the stress of being a government minister led to a brain abscess.

== Honours ==
On 4 July 2024, Coffey was appointed Dame Commander of the Order of the British Empire (DBE) in the 2024 Dissolution Honours for political and public service.

== Notes ==
Parliament of the United Kingdom
Preceded by John Gummer	Member of Parliament for Suffolk Coastal; 2010–2024	Succeeded by Jenny Riddell-Carpenter
Political offices
Preceded by Amber Rudd	Assistant Government Whip; 2014–2015	Succeeded by Simon Kirby
Preceded by Tom Brake	Deputy Leader of the House of Commons; 2015–2016	Succeeded by Michael Ellis
Preceded by Rory Stewart	Parliamentary Under-Secretary of State for Environment and Rural Opportunity; 2016–2019	Succeeded by Herself as Minister of State for Environment and Rural Opportunity
Preceded by Herself as Parliamentary Under-Secretary of State for Environment and Rural Opportunity	Minister of State for Environment and Rural Opportunity; 2019	Succeeded by Rebecca Pow
Preceded by Amber Rudd	Secretary of State for Work and Pensions; 2019–2022	Succeeded by Chloe Smith
Preceded by Dominic Raab	Deputy Prime Minister of the United Kingdom; 2022	Succeeded by Dominic Raab
Preceded by Steve Barclay	Secretary of State for Health and Social Care; 2022	Succeeded by Steve Barclay
Preceded by Ranil Jayawardena	Secretary of State for Environment, Food and Rural Affairs; 2022–2023	Succeeded by Steve Barclay
