= Parliamentary Under-Secretary of State for Nature, Coasts and Rural Affairs =

United Kingdom government ministerial position in the Environment Department

United Kingdom Parliamentary Under-Secretary of State for Nature, Coasts and Rural Affairs
- Royal Arms of His Majesty's Government

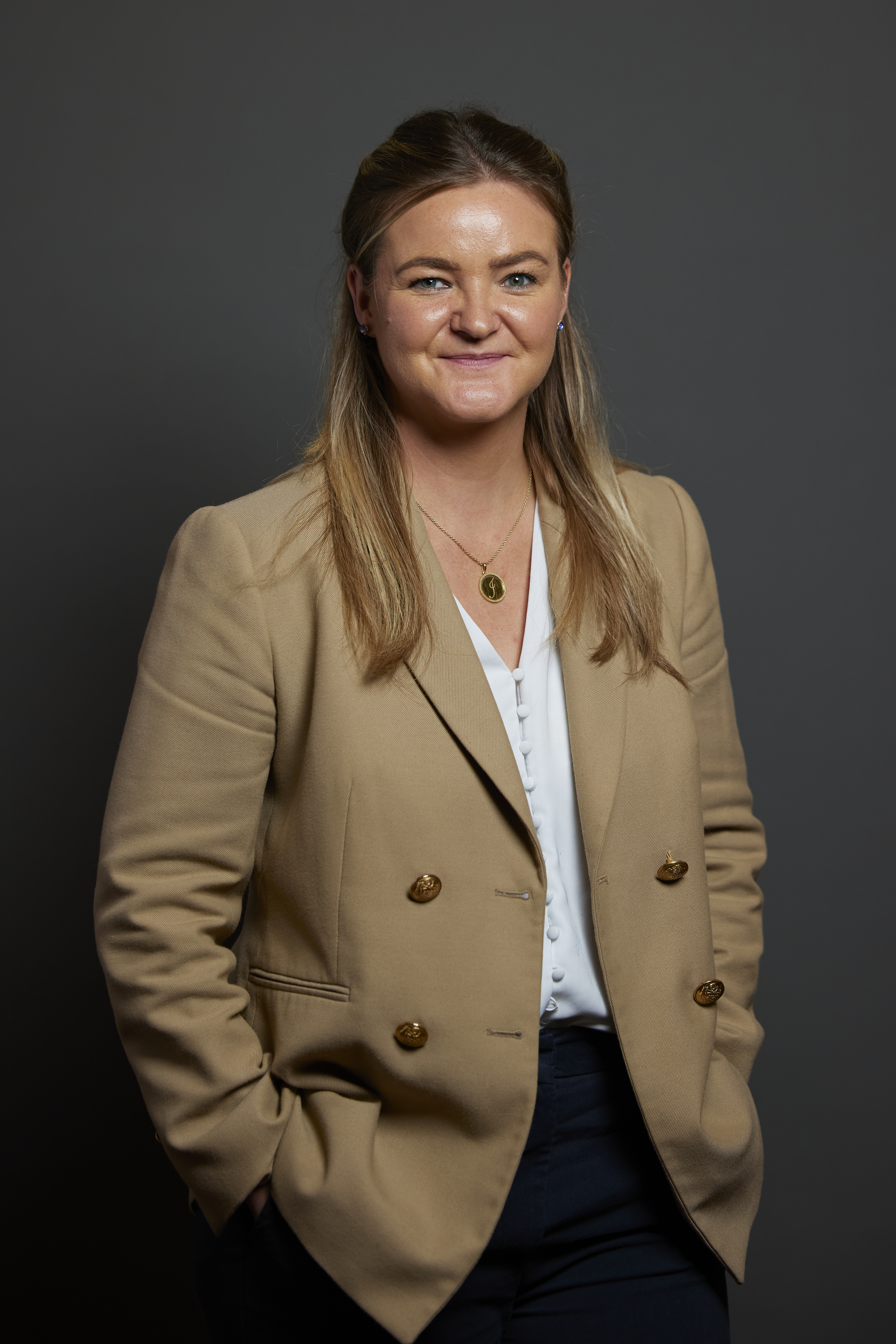
- Incumbent; Jenny Riddell-Carpenter since 21 July 2026
- Department for Environment, Food and Rural Affairs
- Reports to: Secretary of State for Environment, Food and Rural Affairs
- Nominator: Secretary of State
- Appointer: The King (on the advice of the Prime Minister)
- Term length: At His Majesty's pleasure
- Formation: 2018
- First holder: David Rutley
- Website: https://www.gov.uk/government/ministers/parliamentary-under-secretary-of-state--328

The Parliamentary Under-Secretary of State for Nature, Coasts and Rural Affairs, formerly the Parliamentary Under-Secretary of State for Nature Recovery and the Domestic Environment, the Parliamentary Under-Secretary of State for Natural Environment and Land Use and the Parliamentary Under-Secretary of State for Nature, is a junior ministerial position in the Department for Environment, Food and Rural Affairs. The incumbent holder is Member of Parliament (MP) Jenny Riddell-Carpenter.

== History ==
=== Nature Recovery and the Domestic Environment ===
Conservative MP David Rutley was the first holder of the position, being appointed Parliamentary Under-Secretary of State for Nature Recovery and the Domestic Environment on 22 May 2018 in the second May ministry. He briefly served in the position until 19 July 2018, and then the position was vacant for the rest of May's premiership.

Following the resignation of Amber Rudd as Work and Pensions Secretary, Thérèse Coffey was appointed to succeed her. Rebecca Pow was appointed to succeed Coffey under Prime Minister Boris Johnson on 10 September 2019, but with the portfolio for Nature Recovery and the Domestic Environment and thus the position was held once more.

Pow served in the position in both the first Johnson ministry and second Johnson ministry before she resigned during the July 2022 government crisis. Steve Double was appointed as her successor on 8 July 2022, serving until the formation of the Truss ministry.

=== Natural Environment and Land Use ===
Trudy Harrison was appointed the Parliamentary Under-Secretary of State for Natural Environment and Land Use on 28 October 2022 in the Sunak ministry, having previously held the position of Parliamentary Under-Secretary of State for the Environment under Liz Truss. She resigned from the position in the November 2023 British cabinet reshuffle.

=== Nature ===
Pow returned to the position in the November 2023 British cabinet reshuffle as Parliamentary Under-Secretary of State for Nature under Rishi Sunak, serving until the 2024 general election.

After the defeat of the Conservative party in the 2024 general election, Labour MP Mary Creagh was appointed to the position under Prime Minister Keir Starmer. In July 2026, new prime minister Andy Burnham replaced Creagh with Jenny Riddell-Carpenter.

== Responsibilities ==
=== Current ===
- Planning and Land Use
- Protected landscapes
- Rural communities
- Climate adaptation
- International biodiversity
- Access to nature
- Tree planting and forestry
- Green finance
- Domestic biodiversity
- Sponsorship of Natural England, Forestry Commission, Royal Botanic Gardens, Kew and the Joint Nature Conservation Committee (JNCC)

== List of ministers ==
Name	Portrait	Term of office		Political party	P.M.	E.Sec.
Minister of State for Environment
Rodney Elton, 2nd Baron Elton		27 March 1985	10 September 1986	Conservative	Thatcher	Jenkin; Baker
Rodney Elton, 2nd Baron Elton		27 March 1985	10 September 1986	Conservative	Thatcher	Ridley
William Waldegrave		10 September 1986	13 June 1987	Conservative	Thatcher	Ridley
John Ganzoni		13 June 1987	10 January 1988	Conservative	Thatcher	Ridley
Malcolm Sinclair, 20th Earl of Caithness		10 January 1988	25 July 1988	Conservative	Thatcher	Ridley
Michael Howard		25 July 1988	24 July 1989	Conservative	Thatcher	Ridley
Minister of State for Environment and Countryside
David Trippier		24 July 1989	13 April 1992	Conservative	Thatcher	Patten
David Trippier		24 July 1989	13 April 1992	Conservative	Major	Heseltine
David Maclean		14 April 1992	27 May 1993	Conservative	Major	Howard
Tim Yeo		27 May 1993	6 January 1994	Conservative	Major	Gummer
Robert Atkins		7 January 1994	5 July 1995	Conservative	Major	Gummer
Robert Shirley, 13th Earl Ferrers		6 July 1995	2 May 1997	Conservative	Major	Gummer
Minister of State for Environment
Michael Meacher		2 May 1997	13 June 2003	Labour	Blair	Prescott
Michael Meacher		2 May 1997	13 June 2003	Labour	Blair	Beckett
Elliot Morley		13 June 2003	May 2005	Labour	Blair	Beckett
Minister of State for Climate Change and the Environment
Elliot Morley		May 2005	8 May 2006	Labour	Blair	Beckett
Ian Pearson		8 May 2006	28 June 2007	Labour	Blair	Miliband
Minister of State for the Environment
Phil Woolas		28 June 2007	4 October 2008	Labour	Brown	Benn
Philip Hunt, Baron Hunt of Kings Heath		5 October 2008	11 May 2010	Labour Co-op	Brown	Benn
Parliamentary Under-Secretary of State for Resource Management, the Local Environment and Environmental Science
Oliver Eden, 8th Baron Henley		11 May 2010	16 September 2011	Conservative	Cameron	Spelman
John Taylor, Baron Taylor of Holbeach		16 September 2011	4 September 2012	Conservative	Cameron	Spelman
Parliamentary Under-Secretary of State for Natural Environment and Science
Rupert Ponsonby, 7th Baron de Mauley		6 September 2012	7 May 2015	Conservative	Cameron	Paterson; Truss
Parliamentary Under-Secretary of State for the Environment and Rural Life Opportunities
Thérèse Coffey		17 July 2016	22 May 2018	Conservative	May	Leadsom
Thérèse Coffey		17 July 2016	22 May 2018	Conservative	May	Gove
David Rutley		22 May 2018	19 July 2018	Conservative	May	Gove
Thérèse Coffey		19 July 2018	25 July 2019	Conservative	May	Gove
Parliamentary Under-Secretary of State for Nature Recovery and the Domestic Environment
Rebecca Pow		10 September 2019	7 July 2022	Conservative	Johnson	Villiers
Rebecca Pow		10 September 2019	7 July 2022	Conservative	Johnson	Eustice
Steve Double		8 July 2022	8 September 2022	Conservative	Johnson	Eustice
Parliamentary Under-Secretary of State for Natural Environment and Land Use
Trudy Harrison		8 September 2022	13 November 2023	Conservative	Truss; Sunak	Jayawardena; Coffey
Parliamentary Under-Secretary of State for Nature
Rebecca Pow		14 November 2023	5 July 2024	Conservative	Sunak	Barclay
Mary Creagh		18 July 2024	22 July 2026	Labour	Starmer	Reed; Reynolds
Parliamentary Under-Secretary of State for Nature, Coasts and Rural Affairs
Jenny Riddell-Carpenter		21 July 2026	Incumbent	Labour	Burnham	Eagle

== See also ==
- Minister of State for Food Security and Rural Affairs
- Parliamentary Under-Secretary of State for Water and Rural Growth
