= Gideon Amos =

British politician and architect

Gideon Amos OBE MP
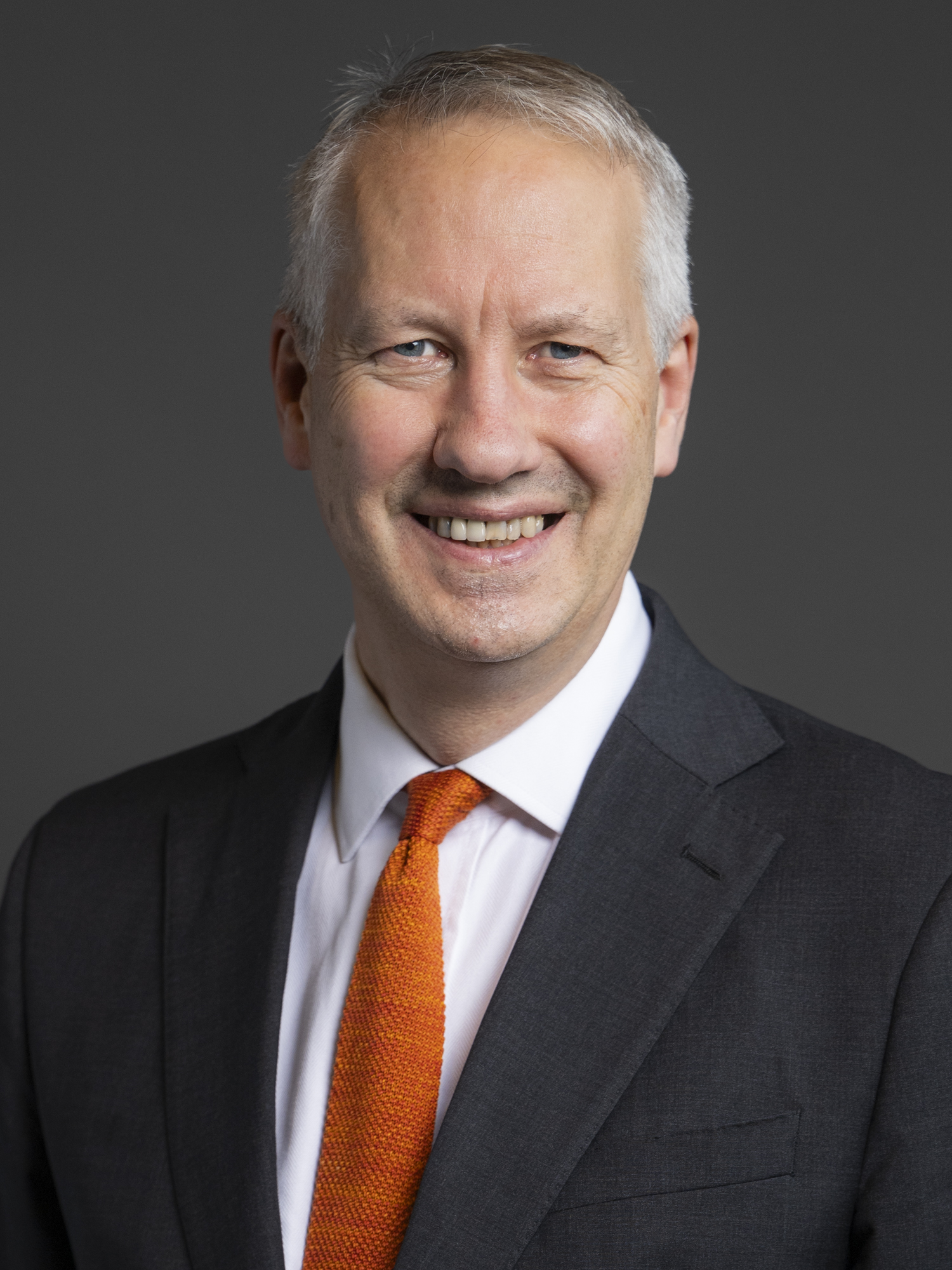
- Official portrait, 2024

Member of Parliament for Taunton and Wellington
- Incumbent
- Assumed office 4 July 2024
- Preceded by: Constituency established
- Majority: 11,939 (23.7%)

Liberal Democrat portfolios
- 2024–2025: Housing and Planning
- 2025–present: Housing and Communities

Personal details
- Born: Gideon John Amos
- Party: Liberal Democrats
- Children: 4
- Education: Oxford Brookes University
- Profession: Chartered architect; urban designer
- Website: www.gideonamos.org.uk

Gideon John Amos OBE is a British politician, architect, and urban designer. He has been Member of Parliament (MP) for Taunton and Wellington since 2024. A member of the Liberal Democrats, he defeated Rebecca Pow of the Conservative Party with a majority of 11,939 in the 2024 United Kingdom general election.

== Early life and education ==
Amos grew up in Somerset. He was privately educated at Wells Cathedral School and studied architecture at Oxford Polytechnic (later Oxford Brookes University). Amos served as a member of the Territorial Army and has been an inspector and helper with the Army Cadet Force.

== Career ==
After qualifying as an urban designer and a chartered architect, Amos designed and managed housing and listed-building developments in the private sector. He was appointed a development designer at Atkins in 1994. He became a director of Planning Aid for London in 1997 and was appointed the chief executive of the Town and Country Planning Association (TCPA) in 2000. Amos sat on advisory groups for planning and eco-development at the Department for Communities and Local Government. He left the TCPA in 2010 to become a commissioner at the new Infrastructure Planning Commission.

Amos worked on infrastructure planning as a civil servant at the Planning Inspectorate for five years, and co-founded Amos Ellis Consulting, a planning consultancy, in 2015. He has served as a council member at the National Infrastructure Planning Association.

In the 2009 New Year Honours, Amos was appointed Officer of the Order of the British Empire (OBE) for services to sustainable development.

=== Political career ===
Amos was a Liberal Democrat member of Oxford City Council for the ward of Central from 1992 to 1996, serving on a planning committee.

In the 2017 and 2019 general elections, Amos stood for election to Parliament in Taunton Deane, finishing in second place to Rebecca Pow of the Conservative Party on both occasions. He defeated Pow in the new constituency of Taunton and Wellington at the 2024 general election, achieving 48.4 per cent of the vote and a majority of 11,939.

== Personal life ==
Amos lives in Taunton with his wife Caroline and their four children.

Parliament of the United Kingdom
New constituency	Member of Parliament for Taunton and Wellington; 2024–present	Incumbent
