= Jeremy Browne =

British Liberal Democrat politician

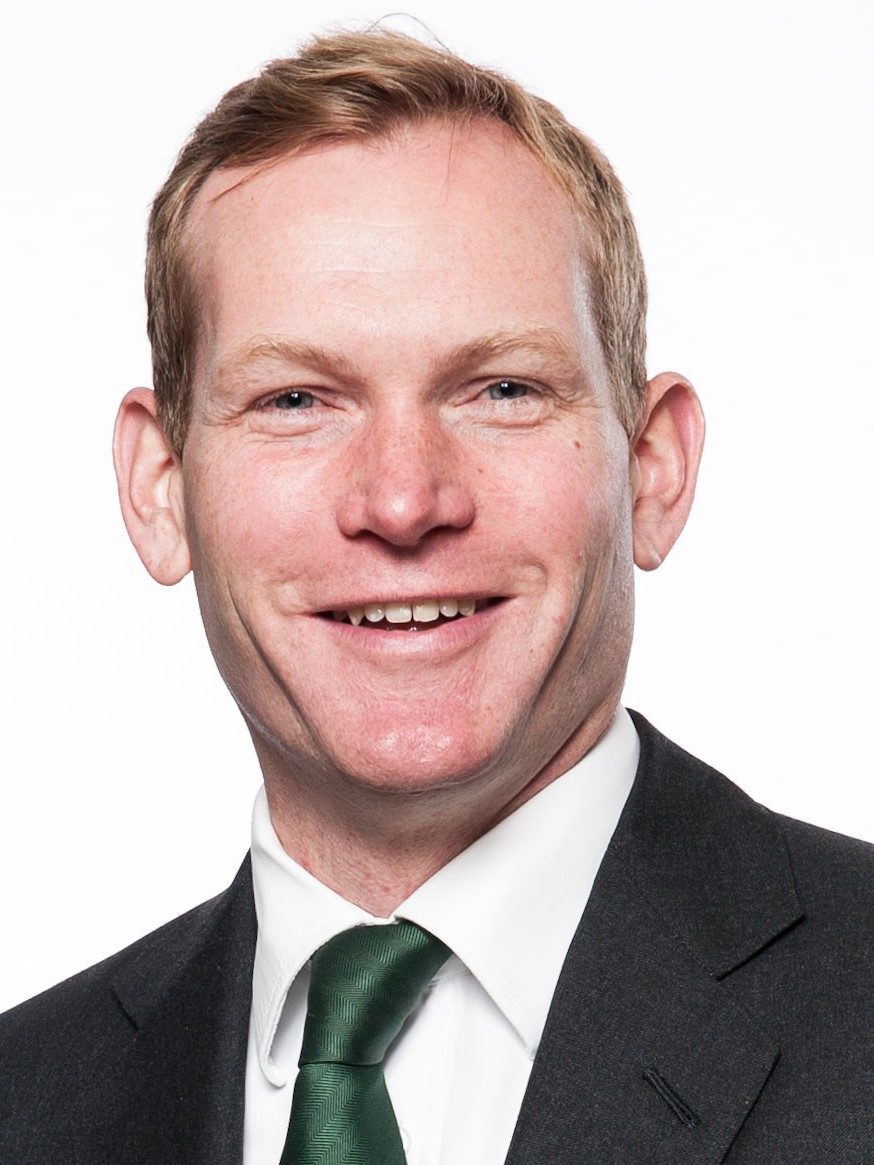
- Official portrait, 2012

Minister of State for Crime Prevention
- In office 4 September 2012 – 7 October 2013
- Prime Minister: David Cameron
- Preceded by: The Lord Henley
- Succeeded by: Norman Baker

Minister of State for Europe and the Americas
- In office 13 May 2010 – 4 September 2012
- Prime Minister: David Cameron
- Preceded by: Office established
- Succeeded by: Hugo Swire

Member of Parliament for Taunton Deane Taunton (2005–2010)
- In office 5 May 2005 – 30 March 2015
- Preceded by: Adrian Flook
- Succeeded by: Rebecca Pow

Liberal Democrat portfolios
- 2007–2010: Deputy HM Treasury

Personal details
- Born: 17 May 1970 (age 56) Islington, London, England
- Party: Liberal Democrats
- Education: University of Nottingham

Jeremy Richard Browne (born 17 May 1970) is a British Liberal Democrat politician who was the Member of Parliament (MP) for Taunton Deane from 2005 to 2015. He served as both Minister of State for Europe and the Americas and Minister of State for Crime Prevention.

In September 2015 Browne was appointed as a "Special Representative for the City of London Corporation" in the European Union, as part of the city's efforts to boost its presence in Brussels. Browne left this role in August 2018.

In July 2022 Browne became Chief Executive of Canning House.

== Early life and education ==
Born in Islington, Browne is the son of British diplomat Sir Nicholas Browne, and, as a child, lived in many different countries, including Iran, Zimbabwe, and Belgium.

Browne was educated at Bedales School, and the University of Nottingham where he studied politics. He became Editor of the University Newspaper and was elected President of the Students' Union in 1992.

== Political career ==
=== Early career ===
Browne became a researcher for the Liberal Democrat MP Alan Beith in 1993. He worked for financial-consultancy Dewe Rogerson and has also worked for public relations firms Edelman and Reputationinc. He worked for the Liberal Democrats nationally and rose to be their Director of Press and Broadcasting under the leadership of Paddy Ashdown and Charles Kennedy.

=== 1997 candidature ===
Browne was chosen by his Enfield local party branch to contest Enfield Southgate parliamentary constituency at the 1997 general election and followed the previous result for the party in achieving third position, behind Labour's Stephen Twigg who on that date ousted the Secretary of State for Defence, Michael Portillo in one of the most surprising landslide results.

=== Becoming an MP ===
Shortly after the 2001 general election Browne was chosen to contest the more winnable marginal seat of Taunton which had been gained by the Conservative Adrian Flook from the Liberal Democrat Jackie Ballard by just 235 votes. The 2005 general election was again close in Taunton; however Browne beat the incumbent by 573 votes, against the national swing.

=== Opposition MP ===
Following his election in 2005, Browne was appointed a spokesman on Foreign Affairs and as Member of the Home Affairs Select Committee.

During the 2006 leadership election, Browne was campaign press secretary to Menzies Campbell. He was later promoted to the Liberal Democrat frontbench team to become the Liberal Democrat spokesman for Home Affairs.

During the 2007 leadership election, he was a supporter of Nick Clegg and a member of his campaign team. In 2008, Browne became Lib Dem Shadow Chief Secretary to the Treasury.

Browne presented a private member's bill entitled the Organ Donation (Presumed Consent) Bill 2008–09. The Bill aimed to address the problem of a lack of organs available for transplant in the UK. Over 1000 people a year die whilst on waiting lists for organs.

During the 2009 expenses scandal, Browne was initially asked to pay back £17,894 in mortgage payments by the Legg Report, after re-mortgaging his London home to provide a deposit for a constituency home. He appealed this decision, making him the first MP to do so, and argued that he was being penalised for using his own money instead of claiming a greater amount from the taxpayer. His appeal was successful, with Sir Paul Kennedy accepting that the arrangement cost the taxpayer less than the alternative options and saying that Browne had acted "openly and honestly, and for the very purpose for which ACA was established". In the final report, Browne was not required to repay anything.

In 2010 following some boundary changes, Browne defended his renamed seat, Taunton Deane, with an increased majority of 3,993.

=== Coalition government ===
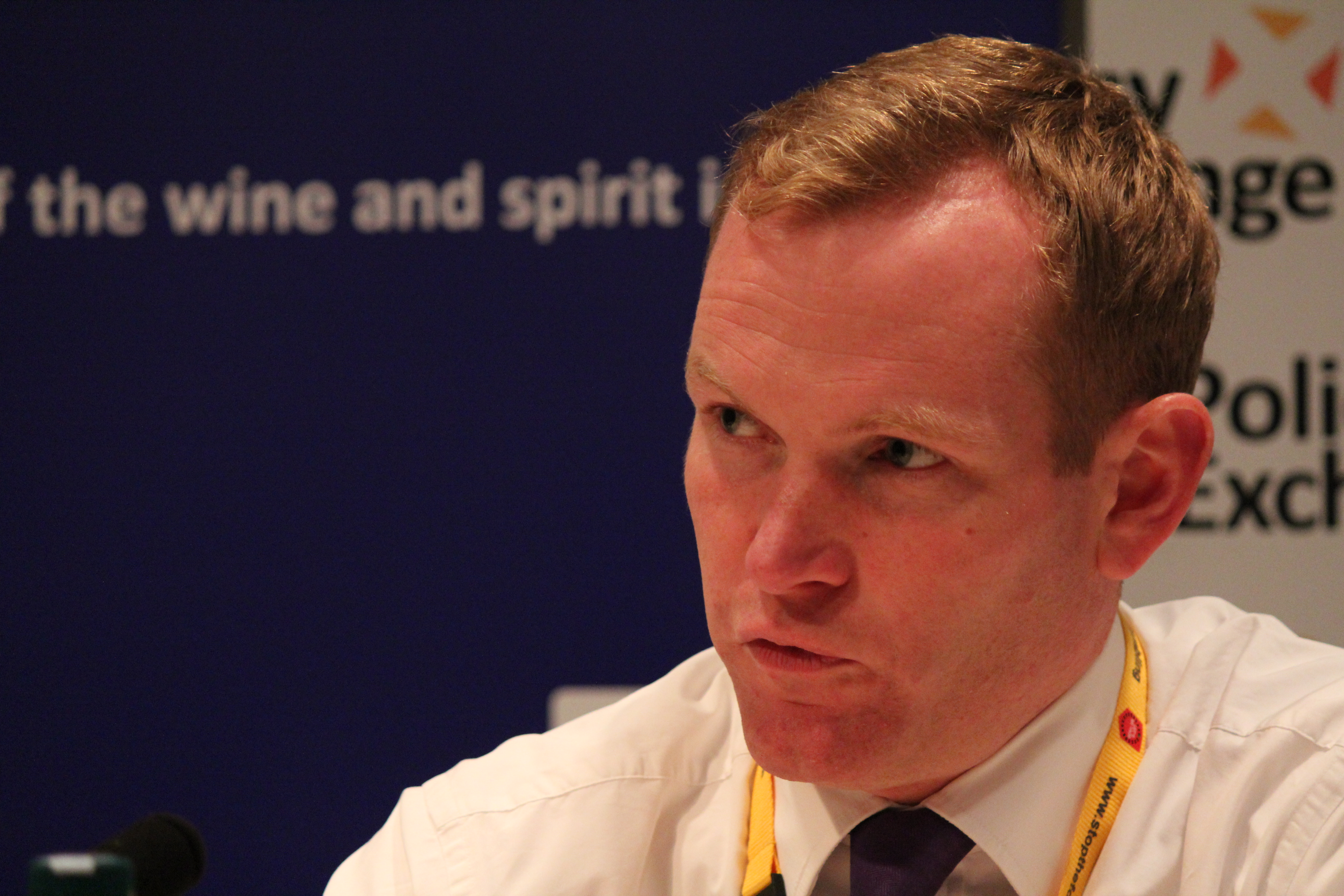
Browne speaking in 2013

Following the 2010 general election as part of the new coalition government Browne was appointed Minister of State with the responsibility for South East Asia & Far East, Caribbean, Central & South America, Australasia & Pacific, human rights, consular, migration, drugs and international crime, public diplomacy and the Olympics at the Foreign Office. In the government reshuffle of September 2012 he was appointed Minister of State for crime prevention and drug policy in the Home Office. In the reshuffle of October 2013 he was returned to the back benches. Browne confirmed that he had been approached by senior Tories, such as Grant Shapps, in the hope he might be persuaded to defect to the Conservative Party. Interviewed about those who said he was in the wrong party, Browne said: "I'd turn that on its head. I'd say my ambition for the Lib Dems is to attract the small 'l' liberals in the Conservative and Labour parties.

Browne was the UK Government representative at the 30th anniversary of the Falklands War.

On 15 October 2014, Browne announced that he would stand down at the next general election.

=== Other interests ===
Browne became a vice president of the charity Parkinson's UK in 2007. Browne is a supporter of Queens Park Rangers Football Club.

=== Political views ===
Browne is strongly associated with the Orange Book wing of the Liberal Democrats. He is a classical liberal: a believer in free-market economics, free trade, low taxation, small government and individual empowerment. At the same time he is both culturally and socially liberal.

In 2014, following his years in the Foreign Office, he wrote a book called Race Plan: An authentic liberal plan to get Britain fit for "The Global Race". It details a warning to British political classes of the urgent necessity to get fit for the global race against the new powerhouses of Asia and Latin America. It has been described as a tightly argued plea for a more ambitious liberalism. Browne writes: "Britain must work with, rather than against, the forces of globalisation. We must champion our economic liberalism if we are to keep our markets open for business. In addition we need to rediscover the true meaning of social liberalism. The task today is to push power, money, information and choice down to the individual citizen, so that everyone can enjoy the opportunities that a fortunate few take for granted." Several of his proposed policy ideas received broad media attention, including calls for the top rate of tax to be returned to 40%, the introduction of portable school vouchers allowing parents to choose their child's school, allowing free schools to function for profit, reduction of the state to 35–38% of GDP, the removal of ring-fencing of public spending in areas including health, more patient choice and the creation of new sources of revenue including insurance payments, abolition of the Department for Energy and Climate Change, big increases in infrastructure spending on new housing, roads, high-speed rail and a new hub airport in the Thames Estuary, and reform of the House of Lords.

=== Polls and awards ===
Jeremy Browne was nominated for the Stonewall Politician of the Year Award in 2011 for his work to support equality for lesbian, gay and bisexual people. He was given a score of 79% in favour of lesbian, gay and bisexual equality by Stonewall. On 5 February 2013 he voted in favour in the House of Commons Second Reading vote on marriage equality in Britain.

Parliament of the United Kingdom
Preceded by Adrian Flook	Member of Parliament for Taunton; 2005 – 2010	Constituency abolished
New constituency	Member of Parliament for Taunton Deane; 2010–2015	Succeeded by Rebecca Pow
