= Raddon Top =

Summit in England

Coordinates: 50.809°N 3.549°W

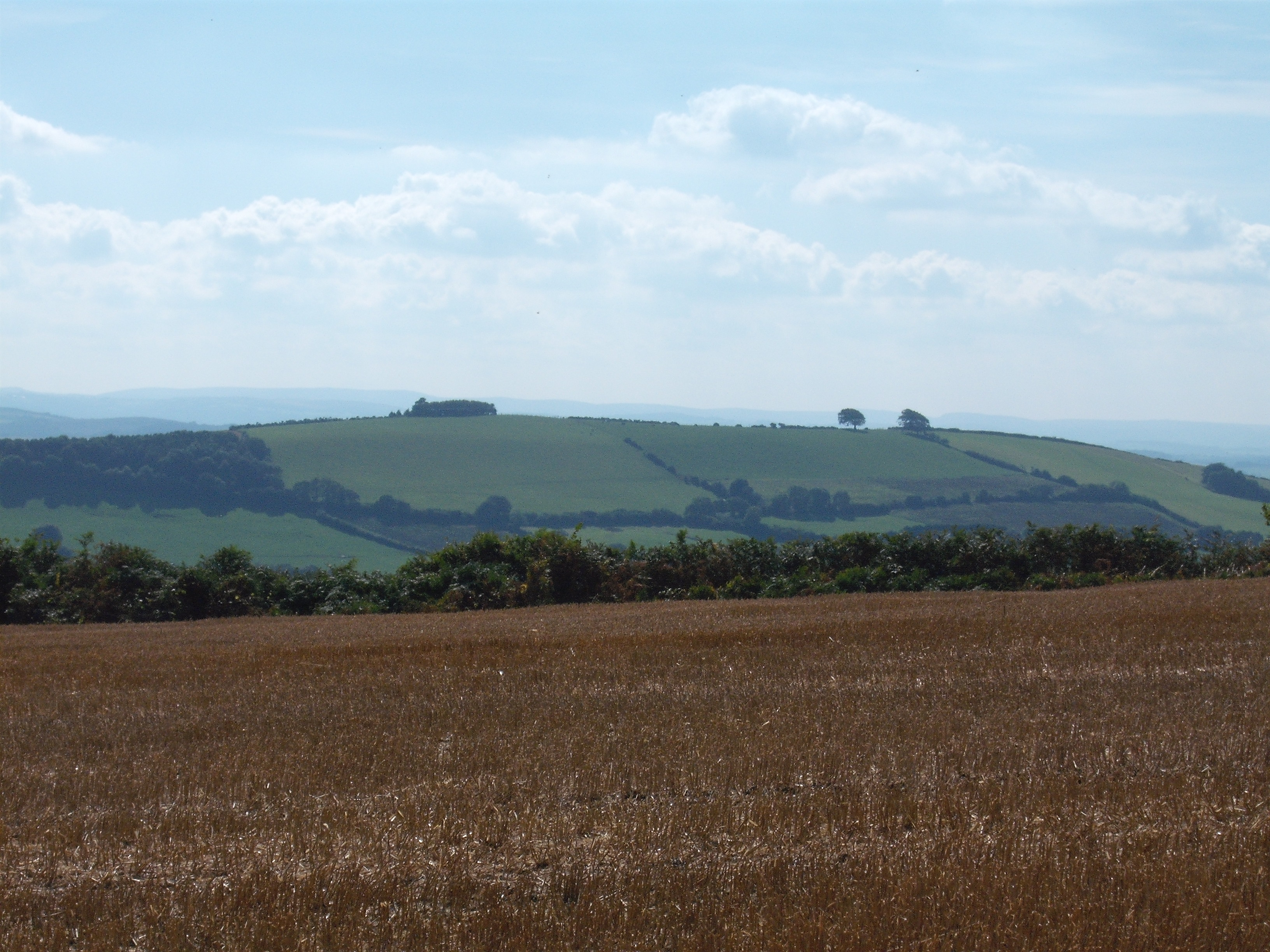
View of Raddon Top from Cadbury Castle

Raddon Top is the highest point of the Raddon Hills, a small ridge of hills in the Shobrooke area of Mid Devon, England. The summit is at some 235 metres (770 ft) above sea level, making it a significant feature in the surrounding countryside.

There is an unclassified road that traverses the hill which is the main route from the village of Cheriton Fitzpaine to Exeter.

== Archaeological site ==
There were once earthworks on the summit, but by the 16th century these had almost been ploughed away. Archaeological excavations in 1994 revealed remains of an Early Iron Age palisaded enclosure and an Iron Age hillfort with timber ramparts. The same excavations also uncovered a much earlier Neolithic causewayed enclosure.
