= Rebecca Pow =

British Conservative politician

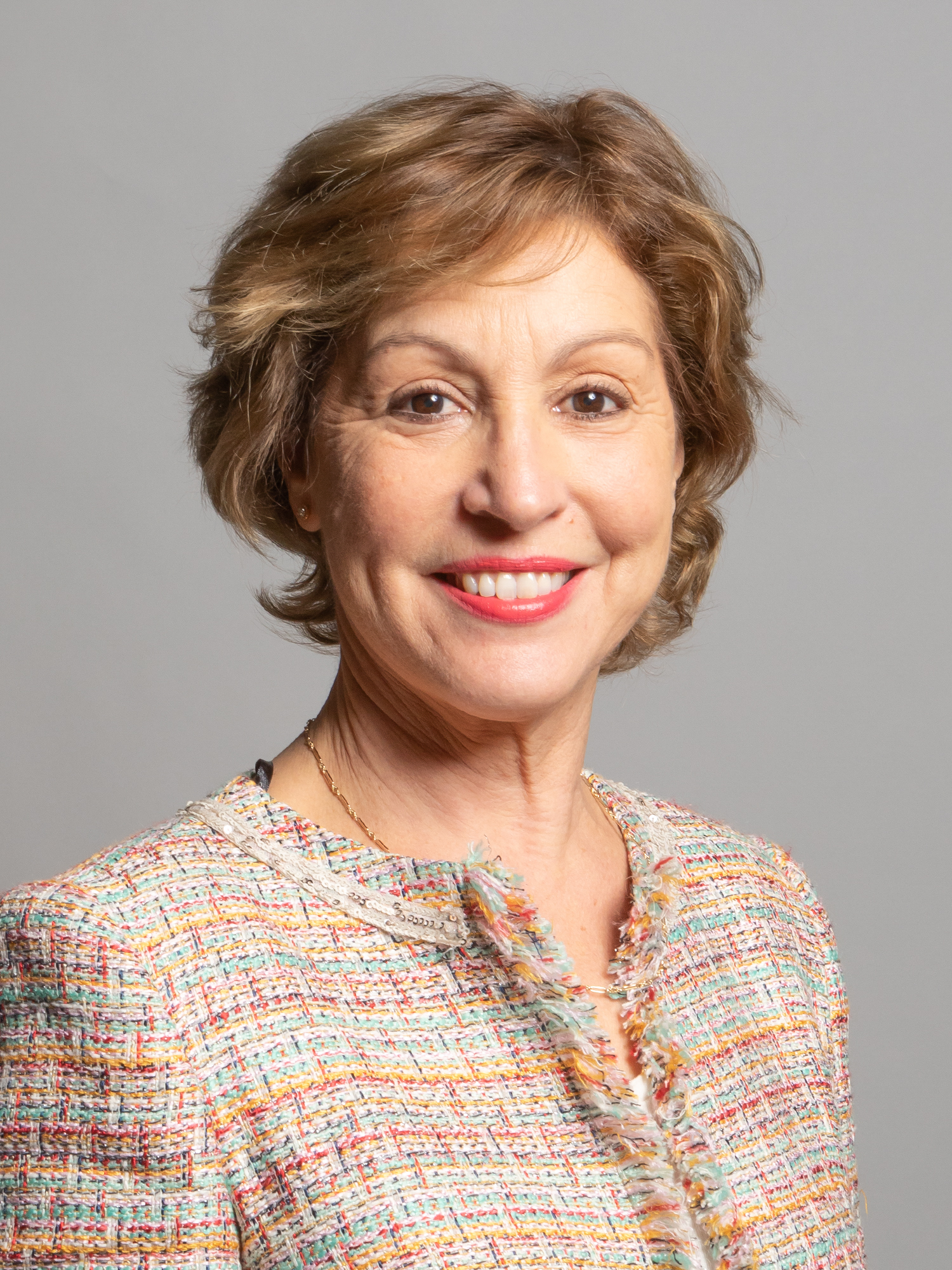
- Official portrait, 2020

Parliamentary Under-Secretary of State for Nature (Note: Parliamentary Under-Secretary of State for Nature Recovery and the Domestic Environment from 10 September 2019 to 7 July 2022)
- In office 14 November 2023 – 4 July 2024
- Prime Minister: Rishi Sunak
- Preceded by: Trudy Harrison
- Succeeded by: Mary Creagh
- In office 10 September 2019 – 7 July 2022
- Prime Minister: Boris Johnson
- Preceded by: Thérèse Coffey
- Succeeded by: Steve Double

Parliamentary Under-Secretary of State for Environmental Quality and Resilience
- In office 28 October 2022 – 14 November 2023
- Prime Minister: Rishi Sunak
- Preceded by: Steve Double
- Succeeded by: Robbie Moore

Parliamentary Under-Secretary of State for Arts, Heritage and Tourism
- In office 23 May 2019 – 10 September 2019
- Prime Minister: Theresa May; Boris Johnson
- Preceded by: Michael Ellis
- Succeeded by: Helen Whately

Member of Parliament for Taunton Deane
- In office 7 May 2015 – 30 May 2024
- Preceded by: Jeremy Browne
- Succeeded by: Constituency abolished

Personal details
- Born: 10 October 1960 (age 65) Somerset, England
- Party: Conservative
- Spouse: Charles Clark (m. 1992; died 2019)
- Children: 3
- Website: Official website

Rebecca Pow (born 10 October 1960), is a British Conservative politician who served as the Member of Parliament (MP) for Taunton Deane from 2015 to 2024. She also served as Parliamentary Under-Secretary of State for Nature from November 2023 to 4 July 2024. Pow lost her bid to be elected as the Member of Parliament (MP) for the revised Taunton and Wellington seat to Gideon Amos of the Liberal Democrats in the 2024 United Kingdom General Election. Pow previously served as Parliamentary Under-Secretary of State at the Department for Environment, Food and Rural Affairs from 2019 to 2022.

== Early life and career ==
Rebecca Pow was born on 10 October 1960 in Inglesbatch, the daughter of Michael Pow, a farmer. She was brought up on the family farm, working there as a teenager and was an active member of both Bath and Taunton Young Farmers Clubs.

After attending Priston village school, Pow continued her education at La Sainte Union Convent in Bath. Pow studied Rural Environment Studies at Wye College, University of London, graduating in 1982.

She had a 20-year career in radio and television, specialising in the environment, farming and gardening, including working for HTV in Bristol and BBC Radio 4. Around 2005 she set up her own public relations consultancy, Pow Productions, as well as continuing to write on gardening and country living.

Pow was previously a parish councillor for Stoke St Mary and trustee of the Somerset Wildlife Trust. After working for the National Farmers Union, she became a journalist specialising in environment, farming and gardening and has reported for BBC, ITV and Channel 4. She stepped down as vice-president of Somerset Wildlife Trust in June 2018, following an online petition criticising her support for badger culling.

== Parliamentary career ==
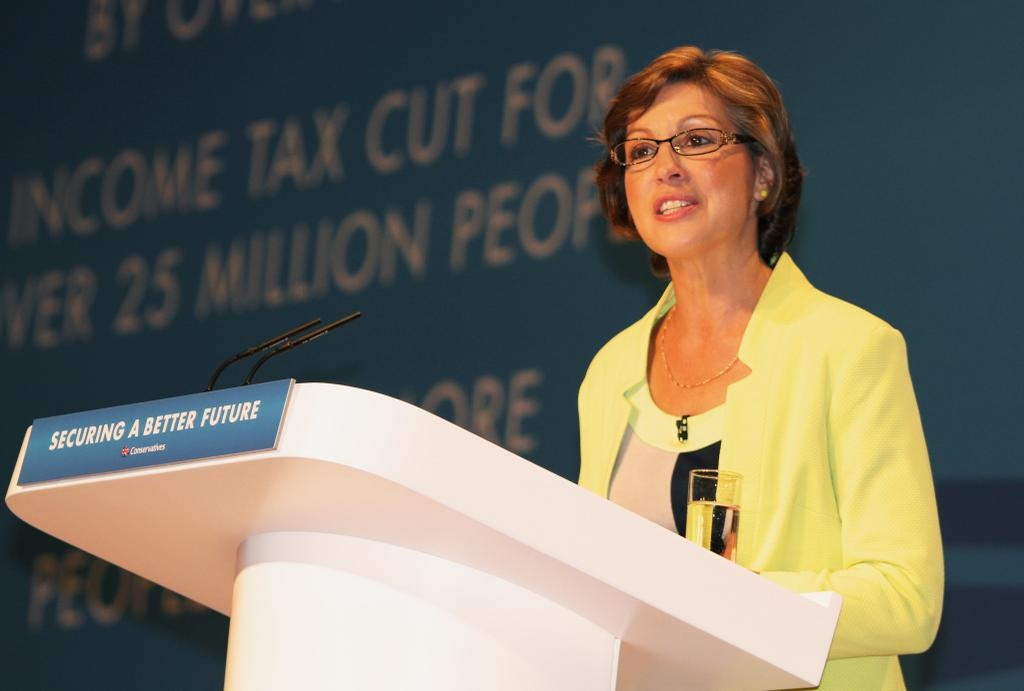
Pow speaking at the 2014 Conservative Party Conference

At the 2015 general election, Pow was elected to Parliament as MP for Taunton Deane with 48.1% of the vote and a majority of 15,491.

She declared that she would vote Remain in the 2016 Brexit referendum.

During the 2015–17 Parliament, Pow sat on the Environmental Audit Select Committee and Environment, Food and Rural Affairs Select Committee.

Pow was re-elected as MP for Taunton Deane at the snap 2017 general election with an increased vote share of 52.9% and an increased majority of 15,887.

Pow received local and national criticism for stating during the 2017 Budget debate that people in Taunton have "thousands of extra pounds in their pockets".

In April 2018, Pow was awarded a Green Heart Hero Award by The Climate Coalition, a coalition of over 100 charities and community groups across the UK, for being the "Greenest New MP" for her environmental work. A constituent recognising the award nevertheless criticised Pow's record on low carbon measures.

Pow was appointed in September 2018 as a Parliamentary Private Secretary (PPS) to the Department for Environment, Food and Rural Affairs Ministerial team, before serving as PPS to Secretary of State for Work and Pensions Esther McVey until her Ministerial appointment in May 2019.

In May 2019, it was alleged that Pow was one of a number of MPs who had legally claimed parliamentary expenses for an 'accommodation uplift' contrary to the measure's original purpose.

On 10 September 2019, during the first Johnson ministry, Pow was appointed Parliamentary Under-Secretary of State at the Department for Environment, Food and Rural Affairs. Her ministerial portfolio included the domestic natural environment, climate change adaptation, land use and floods and water. She resigned from this position on 7 July 2022, as part of the July 2022 United Kingdom government crisis.

At the 2019 general election, Pow was again re-elected, with an increased vote share of 53.6% and a decreased majority of 11,700.

Prior to the 2024 general election, Pow's constituency of Taunton Deane was abolished, and replaced with Taunton and Wellington. In March 2024, Pow was selected as the Conservative candidate for Taunton and Wellington at the 2024 general election. Pow was ultimately defeated in the polls, coming second to the Liberal Democrat candidate Gideon Amos by 24,331 votes to 12,392.

== Post-parliamentary career ==
In June 2025, it was announced that the Environmental Industries Association (EIA) had appointed Pow as Co-Chair of the EIA Climate Change Working Group.

== Personal life ==
Pow met her late husband, Charles Clark, at a Young Farmers Club event. They were married for 27 years, until his death in 2019, and had three children together.

== Notes ==
Parliament of the United Kingdom
Preceded by Jeremy Browne	Member of Parliament for Taunton Deane; 2015–2024	Succeeded by Constituency abolished
Political offices
Preceded by Michael Ellis	Parliamentary Under-Secretary of State for Arts, Heritage and Tourism; 2019	Succeeded by Helen Whately
Preceded by Thérèse Coffey	Parliamentary Under-Secretary of State for Rural Affairs and Biosecurity; 2019–2022	Succeeded by Steve Double
