= Taunton Deane (constituency) =

UK Parliament constituency (2010–2024)

Coordinates: 51.0000°N 3.1700°W

- Former county constituency for the House of Commons
- Boundary of Taunton Deane in Somerset

- Location of Somerset within England
- County: Somerset
- Electorate: 82,882 (December 2010)
- Major settlements: Taunton, Wellington

2010–2024
- Seats: One
- Created from: Taunton
- Replaced by: Taunton and Wellington & Tiverton and Minehead

Taunton Deane was a constituency (Note: A county constituency (for the purposes of election expenses and type of returning officer)) in Somerset represented in the House of Commons of the UK Parliament. (Note: As with all constituencies, the constituency elects one Member of Parliament (MP) by the first past the post system of election at least every five years.) Further to the completion of the 2023 Periodic Review of Westminster constituencies, the seat was abolished. Subject to moderate boundary changes, it was reformed as Taunton and Wellington, which was first contested at the 2024 UK general election.

== History ==
Parliament accepted the Boundary Commission's Fifth Periodic Review of Westminster constituencies which created this constituency for the 2010 UK general election as a reduced form of the Taunton seat. The western wards, transferred to the new seat of Bridgwater and West Somerset for 2010, were all close to or in Exmoor, which were five in number:

- Aville Vale, Brompton Ralph and Haddon, Dulverton and Brushford, Exmoor and, Qualme.

Political history

The predecessor seat, while approximately 7% larger in electorate (and thus due to population and settlements' growth, oversized), had been held by a Liberal Democrat, Jeremy Browne, since 2005, who won Taunton Deane as its main successor with a relatively marginal majority. In the two previous elections, the seat had seen alternation between Conservative and a Liberal Democrat control. The Taunton Deane seat was won by the Conservatives in the 2015 general election with a large majority. The last general election in which either party polled less than 38% of the vote, thus allowing a larger majority, was in 1987, taking into account only one of their notionally equivalent predecessors, the Social Democratic Party – their candidate participated in the SDP–Liberal Alliance.

Prominent members

Between 2010 and 2015, the seat was represented by Jeremy Browne, who served in the Cameron–Clegg coalition government as a Minister of State in the Foreign and Commonwealth Office and the Home Office.

== Boundaries ==
Map of boundaries 2010–2024

The seat had electoral wards:

- Bishop's Hull, Bishops Lydeard, Blackdown, Bradford on Tone, Comeytrowe, Milverton and North Deane, Monument, Neroche, North Curry, Norton Fitzwarren, Ruishton and Creech, Staplegrove, Stoke St Gregory, Taunton: Blackbrook and Holway, Eastgate, Fairwater, Halcon, Killams and Mountfield, Lyngford, Manor and Wilton, Pyrland and Rowbarton wards, Trull, Wellington: East, North, Rockwell Green and West wards, West Monkton, Wiveliscombe and West Deane forming the Borough of Taunton Deane

This constituency centred on the town of Taunton while extending to include Wellington within an approximate rhombus-shaped swathe of land forming the south-western portion of Somerset. The constituency covered a large part of the Devon—Somerset border.

== History ==
In the 2005 UK general election, the victorious Liberal Democrats' candidate in Taunton required the smallest percentage swing from the Conservative Party MP for them to take the seat. In the 2010 UK general election, the seat was identified as a target for the Conservative Party, ranking 29th on their target list. The incumbent, Jeremy Browne had a notional 3.3% lead from the 2005 election. Browne held the seat in 2010, increasing his majority to 6.9%, a 1.8% swing from the Conservatives to the Liberal Democrats.

== Constituency profile ==
The seat was a mixture of partially agricultural commuter villages and a spacious urban town, which has business parks in a similar way to Wells, connected by road and rail to the major conurbations, north and south, Bristol and Exeter. The majority of the eastern half of the ridge-like Blackdown Hills is in the Blackdown electoral ward. Workless claimants, registered jobseekers, were in November 2012 lower than the national average of 3.8%, at 2.6% of the population based on a statistical compilation by The Guardian.

== Members of Parliament ==
=== 2010–2024 ===
Election	Member	Party	Notes
2010	Jeremy Browne	Liberal Democrats	Previously MP for Taunton from 2005. Stood down in 2015.
2015	Rebecca Pow	Conservative	Parliamentary Under-Secretary of State for Arts, Heritage and Tourism (2019); Parliamentary Under-Secretary of State for Nature Recovery and the Domestic Environment (2019–2022)
2024	constituency abolished: see Taunton and Wellington and Tiverton and Minehead		

== Elections ==
=== Elections in the 2010s ===
General election 2019: Taunton Deane
Party	Candidate	Votes	%	±%
Conservative	Rebecca Pow	34,164	53.6	+0.7
Liberal Democrats	Gideon Amos	22,464	35.2	+7.5
Labour	Liam Canham	4,715	7.4	−8.0
Independent	John Hunt	2,390	3.8	New
Majority		11,700	18.4	−6.8
Turnout		63,733	71.9	−1.9
Conservative hold		Swing	-3.5	

General election 2017: Taunton Deane
Party	Candidate	Votes	%	±%
Conservative	Rebecca Pow	33,334	52.9	+4.8
Liberal Democrats	Gideon Amos	17,446	27.7	+6.4
Labour	Martin Jevon	9,689	15.4	+6.2
UKIP	Alan Dimmick	1,434	2.3	−9.7
Green	Clive Martin	1,151	1.8	−2.7
Majority		15,887	25.2	−1.6
Turnout		63,053	73.8	+3.1
Conservative hold		Swing	-0.7	

General election 2015: Taunton Deane
Party	Candidate	Votes	%	±%
Conservative	Rebecca Pow	27,849	48.1	+5.9
Liberal Democrats	Rachel Gilmour	12,358	21.3	−27.8
UKIP	Laura Bailhache	6,921	12.0	+8.4
Labour	Neil Guild	5,347	9.2	+4.1
Green	Clive Martin	2,630	4.5	New
Independent	Mike Rigby	2,568	4.4	New
TUSC	Stephen German	118	0.2	New
Independent	Bruce Gauld	96	0.2	New
Majority		15,491	26.8	NA
Turnout		57,887	70.7	+0.2
Conservative gain from Liberal Democrats		Swing	+16.8	

General election 2010: Taunton Deane
Party	Candidate	Votes	%	±%
Liberal Democrats	Jeremy Browne	28,531	49.1	+4.7
Conservative	Mark Formosa	24,538	42.2	+0.8
Labour	Martin Jevon	2,967	5.1	−6.8
UKIP	Tony McIntyre	2,114	3.6	+1.2
Majority		3,993	6.9	+3.9
Turnout		58,150	70.5	+1.2
Liberal Democrats hold		Swing	+1.8	

== See also ==
- List of parliamentary constituencies in Somerset

== Sources ==
- UK Constituency Maps
- BBC Vote 2001
- BBC Election 2005
