= List of United Kingdom Liberal Democrat MPs (2024–present) =

Seventy-two Liberal Democrat members of Parliament (MPs) were elected to the House of Commons of the United Kingdom at the 2024 general election.

== The List ==
| Constituency | Name | Majority (vote) | Majority (%) | In 2024 election |
|---|---|---|---|---|
| Bath | Wera Hobhouse | 11,218 | 23.3 | Seat held |
| Bicester and Woodstock | Calum Miller | 4,958 | 9.9 | Won new seat |
| Brecon, Radnor and Cwm Tawe | David Chadwick | 1,472 | 3.2 | Defeated incumbent, Fay Jones (Conservative) |
| Caithness, Sutherland and Easter Ross | Jamie Stone | 10,489 | 22.8 | Seat held (Notional gain) |
| Carshalton and Wallington | Bobby Dean | 7,905 | 16.9 | Defeated incumbent, Elliot Colburn (Conservative) |
| Cheadle | Tom Morrison | 12,235 | 24.1 | Defeated incumbent, Mary Robinson (Conservative) |
| Chelmsford | Marie Goldman | 4,753 | 9.4 | Defeated incumbent, Vicky Ford (Conservative) |
| Cheltenham | Max Wilkinson | 7,210 | 14.6 | Defeated incumbent, Alex Chalk (Conservative) |
| Chesham and Amersham | Sarah Green | 5,451 | 10.0 | Held by-election gain |
| Chichester | Jess Brown-Fuller | 12,172 | 23.4 | Defeated incumbent, Gillian Keegan (Conservative) |
| Chippenham | Sarah Gibson | 8,138 | 16.4 | Previous incumbent, Michelle Donelan (Conservative) contested Melksham and Devizes |
| Didcot and Wantage | Olly Glover | 6,233 | 11.4 | Defeated incumbent, David Johnston (Conservative) |
| Dorking and Horley | Chris Coghlan | 5,391 | 10.8 | Won new seat |
| Eastbourne | Josh Babarinde | 12,204 | 26.8 | Defeated incumbent, Caroline Ansell (Conservative) |
| Eastleigh | Liz Jarvis | 1,546 | 3.3 | Previous incumbent, Paul Holmes (Conservative) stood in Hamble Valley |
| Edinburgh West | Christine Jardine | 16,470 | 31.4 | Seat held |
| Ely and East Cambridgeshire | Charlotte Cane | 495 | 0.9 | Defeated incumbent, Lucy Frazer (Conservative) |
| Epsom and Ewell | Helen Maguire | 9,957 | 19.4 | Previous incumbent, Chris Grayling (Conservative), did not stand |
| Esher and Walton | Monica Harding | 12,003 | 22.3 | Previous incumbent, Dominic Raab (Conservative), did not stand |
| Frome and East Somerset | Anna Sabine | 5,415 | 11.6 | Won new seat |
| Glastonbury and Somerton | Sarah Dyke | 6,611 | 13.9 | Held by-election gain |
| Guildford | Zöe Franklin | 8,429 | 17.5 | Defeated incumbent, Angela Richardson (Conservative) |
| Harpenden and Berkhamsted | Victoria Collins | 10,708 | 19.7 | Won new seat |
| Harrogate and Knaresborough | Tom Gordon | 8,238 | 15.8 | Defeated incumbent, Andrew Jones (Conservative) |
| Hazel Grove | Lisa Smart | 6,500 | 14.1 | Previous incumbent, William Wragg (Independent, previously Conservative) did not stand |
| Henley and Thame | Freddie van Mierlo | 6,267 | 11.8 | Previous incumbent John Howell (Conservative), did not stand |
| Honiton and Sidmouth | Richard Foord | 6,700 | 13.2 | Defeated incumbent, Simon Jupp (Conservative), held by-election gain. |
| Horsham | John Milne | 2,517 | 4.5 | Defeated incumbent, Jeremy Quin (Conservative) |
| Inverness, Skye and West Ross-shire | Angus MacDonald | 2,160 | 4.5 | Defeated incumbent, Drew Hendry (Scottish National Party) |
| Kingston and Surbiton | Ed Davey | 17,235 | 34.0 | Seat held |
| Lewes | James MacCleary | 12,624 | 23.7 | Defeated incumbent, Maria Caulfield (Conservative) |
| Maidenhead | Joshua Reynolds | 2,963 | 5.9 | Previous incumbent, Theresa May (Conservative), did not stand |
| Melksham and Devizes | Brian Mathew | 2,401 | 4.7 | Won new seat |
| Mid Dorset and North Poole | Vikki Slade | 1,352 | 2.7 | Defeated incumbent, Michael Tomlinson (Conservative) |
| Mid Dunbartonshire | Susan Murray | 9,673 | 18.3 | Defeated incumbent, Amy Callaghan (Scottish National Party) |
| Mid Sussex | Alison Bennett | 6,662 | 12.5 | Previous incumbent, Mims Davies (Conservative), stood in East Grinstead and Uckfield |
| Newbury | Lee Dillon | 2,377 | 4.9 | Defeated incumbent, Laura Farris (Conservative) |
| Newton Abbot | Martin Wrigley | 2,246 | 4.7 | Defeated incumbent, Anne Marie Morris (Conservative) |
| North Cornwall | Ben Maguire | 9,957 | 19.4 | Defeated incumbent, Scott Mann (Conservative) |
| North Devon | Ian Roome | 6,744 | 13.1 | Defeated incumbent, Selaine Saxby (Conservative) |
| North East Fife | Wendy Chamberlain | 13,479 | 31.5 | Seat held (Notional gain) |
| North East Hampshire | Alex Brewer | 634 | 1.1 | Defeated incumbent, Ranil Jayawardena (Conservative) |
| North Norfolk | Steffan Aquarone | 2,585 | 5.5 | Defeated incumbent, Duncan Baker (Conservative) |
| North Shropshire | Helen Morgan | 15,311 | 30.9 | Held by-election gain |
| Orkney and Shetland | Alistair Carmichael | 7,807 | 37.7 | Seat held |
| Oxford West and Abingdon | Layla Moran | 14,894 | 32.4 | Seat held |
| Richmond Park | Sarah Olney | 17,155 | 32.9 | Seat held |
| South Cambridgeshire | Pippa Heylings | 10,641 | 19.4 | Previous incumbent, Anthony Browne (Conservative), did not stand |
| South Cotswolds | Roz Savage | 4,973 | 9.5 | Defeated incumbent, James Gray (Conservative) |
| South Devon | Caroline Voaden | 7,127 | 14.5 | Defeated incumbent, Anthony Mangnall (Conservative) |
| St Albans | Daisy Cooper | 19,834 | 38.4 | Seat held |
| St Ives | Andrew George | 13,786 | 28.7 | Defeated incumbent, Derek Thomas (Conservative) |
| St Neots and Mid Cambridgeshire | Ian Sollom | 4,621 | 8.7 | Won new seat |
| Stratford-on-Avon | Manuela Perteghella | 7,122 | 13.4 | Previous incumbent, Nadhim Zahawi (Conservative), did not stand |
| Surrey Heath | Al Pinkerton | 5,640 | 11.8 | Previous incumbent, Michael Gove (Conservative), did not stand |
| Sutton and Cheam | Luke Taylor | 3,801 | 8.0 | Previous incumbent, Paul Scully (Conservative), did not stand |
| Taunton and Wellington | Gideon Amos | 11,939 | 23.7 | Defeated incumbent, Rebecca Pow (Conservative) |
| Tewkesbury | Cameron Thomas | 6,262 | 12.9 | Defeated incumbent, Laurence Robertson (Conservative) |
| Thornbury and Yate | Claire Young | 3,014 | 5.6 | Defeated incumbent, Luke Hall (Conservative) |
| Tiverton and Minehead | Rachel Gilmour | 3,507 | 7.4 | Won new seat |
| Torbay | Steve Darling | 5,349 | 11.6 | Defeated incumbent, Kevin Foster (Conservative) |
| Tunbridge Wells | Mike Martin | 8,687 | 16.0 | Previous incumbent, Greg Clark (Conservative), did not stand |
| Twickenham | Munira Wilson | 21,457 | 40.0 | Seat held |
| Wells and Mendip Hills | Tessa Munt | 11,121 | 22.1 | Won new seat |
| West Dorset | Edward Morello | 7,789 | 14.8 | Defeated incumbent, Chris Loder (Conservative) |
| Westmorland and Lonsdale | Tim Farron | 21,472 | 43.3 | Seat held |
| Wimbledon | Paul Kohler | 12,610 | 22.9 | Previous incumbent, Stephen Hammond (Conservative), did not stand |
| Winchester | Danny Chambers | 13,821 | 24.2 | Previous incumbent, Steve Brine (Conservative), did not stand |
| Witney | Charlie Maynard | 4,339 | 8.6 | Defeated incumbent, Robert Courts (Conservative) |
| Woking | Will Forster | 11,246 | 23.4 | Defeated incumbent, Jonathan Lord (Conservative) |
| Wokingham | Clive Jones | 8,345 | 15.5 | Previous incumbent, John Redwood (Conservative), did not stand |
| Yeovil | Adam Dance | 12,268 | 25.1 | Defeated incumbent, Marcus Fysh (Conservative) |
