= Council on Geostrategy =

British think tank

The Council on Geostrategy is a non-profit think tank based in Westminster, London, England, focusing on shaping HM Government's foreign and defence policy in an "international environment characterised by geopolitical competition and environmental crisis". The organisation has research projects spanning the Euro-Atlantic, Indo-Pacific and Polar regions and has a particular focus on naval power.

== History ==
The council was founded in March 2021 by James Rogers, the director of research, and Viktorija Starych-Samuolienė, the director of strategy.

On 16 September 2021, UK National Security Adviser Stephen Lovegrove gave an inaugural speech for the Council on Geostrategy, largely addressing the consequences of the recent western withdrawal from Afghanistan. On 14 October 2021, an inaugural residential conference was held at Wilton Park, the Foreign Office conference centre, titled "Extending ‘Global Britain’ through naval diplomacy" with keynote speaker the First Sea Lord Admiral Sir Tony Radakin. The new First Sea Lord Admiral Sir Ben Key gave a speech at a meeting of the council the following year titled "Geopolitical realignment in a maritime century", held at The Naval and Military Club in London.

== Purpose and Aims ==
The organisation produces research to shape policy and public debate. CoG experts focus on strategic defence, sea power, and the connectivities between the Euro-Atlantic and the Indo-Pacific:

- Specialised research: Running targeted projects, including Strategic Defence Unit, UK-US Strategic Forum, China Observatory and the AUKUS APPG Secretariat. As well as research with a UK-German strategic focus.
- Shaping the discourse: Publishing the online magazine Britain’s World, hosting the podcast ‘Defence Talks: Securing the UK Advantage’, and maintains a presence across major media platforms.
- Advising policymakers: CoG experts are regularly called upon to provide oral and written evidence to the UK Parliament and consult with the relevant ministries in Whitehall, directly informing national strategy.

== Research ==
The Council conducts and publishes research on British defence, foreign affairs, and maritime strategy, focusing on the connectivities between the Euro-Atlantic and the Indo-Pacific regions.

The Strategic Defence Unit publishes research on the UK's competitive position, including reports on transatlantic relations, space policy, hypersonic weaponry and sub-strategic nuclear posture.

The Indo-Pacific Project focuses on the UK’s interests in the Indo-Pacific. It has published work on the future of British defence posture in the Indo-Pacific and Chinese economic coercion in the region.

The Sea Power Laboratory conducts research into British maritime strategy and national interests. It convenes allied naval leaders through the Sea Power Series events programme, including some of the notable names:

- Adm. Pierre Vandier, Supreme Allied Commander Transformation, NATO.
- V. Adm. Angus Topshee CMM MSM CD, Commander of the Royal Canadian Navy
- V. Adm. Mark Hammond, Chief of Navy in the Royal Australian Navy.

The China Observatory focuses on UK-Chinese relations and the actions of the Chinese Communist Party. It publishes analysis on China’s use of science and technology to advance its geopolitical aims, and how Britain can balance its trade relationship with China against security concerns.

Caudwell Strong Britain, Sponsored by John Caudwell, this project has published analysis on the UK's science and technology sector, including infrastructure, skills, and education. It has published reports featuring forewords by figures such as Sir Tony Blair.

The Council also conducts work into the UK-Europe relationship, including collaboration with Konrad Adenauer Stiftung on the UK-German strategic relationship.

The Council established a trilateral commission in February 2023, publishing on the British-Polish-Ukrainian relationship. In 2024, Secretary of State's Office of Net Assessment and Challenge commissioned a Point Paper with the Council on Geostrategy "calling on the British government to collaborate with allies in providing Ukraine with long-range and advanced weapons"[1] for the use against the Russian invasion of Ukraine.

== Events ==
The organisation hosts events bringing together key stakeholders – including politicians, government officials, military officers, diplomats, business leaders, and academic experts:

- Flagship events: CoG has hosted the Royal Navy’s flagship event, the International Sea Power Conference, for the past three years.
- Senior forums: The Council runs regular closed-door discussions on geopolitical issues through Geostrategy Forum, Whitehall Briefings, and Sea Power Series. The organisation also hosted the launch of the National Security Strategy for the Cabinet Office.
- Public engagement: The Council regularly hosts public events to present research, engage with the media, and foster debate with the wider interested public.

Notable speakers have included:

- Prof. John Bew CMG, Professor in History and Foreign Policy at King's College London
- Lord Coaker, Minister of State for Defence
- Major General Paul Tedman CBE, commander of United Kingdom Space Command

The Council on Geostrategy hosts events to facilitate the debate on key geostrategy issues. The Geostrategy Forum and Whitehall Briefing series are round-table discussions that feature presentations by a Whitehall official, senior parliamentarians, and naval officers, followed by a question-and-answer session.

== Conferences ==
The Council on Geostrategy organises the International Sea Power Conference on behalf of the Royal Navy. In 2025, the Sea Power Conference took place at BT Headquarters and featured keynote address and panel discussions from notable figures including:

- General Sir Gwyn Jenkins, First Sea Lord and Chief of the Naval Staff
- Luke Pollard MP, Minister of State for Defence Readiness and Industry
- James Murray MP, Chief Secretary to the Treasury

In June 2025, the Council hosted a half-day conference at the US Embassy on the future of the transatlantic relationship, with speeches individuals including Luke Pollard MP, Minister for Defence Readiness and Industry; Matthew Palmer, Deputy Chief of Mission, Embassy of the United States of America; Dame Karen Pierce DCMG, British Ambassador to the United States (2020 - 2025).

== Policy ==
The Council gives written and oral evidence to parliament on a range of defence topics including recently on disinformation diplomacy by Russia and China, and UK engagement with space. Additionally, the Council acts as the Secretariat for the All-Party Parliamentary Group on AUKUS, which convenes MPs and Peers to raise awareness and understanding of the Australia, the United Kingdom, and the United States security pact.

== Publications ==
The Council on Geostrategy publishes three online magazines, using the Substack platform. Britain's World is a weekly geopolitical affairs summary with open briefings from defence and foreign affairs experts and recommendations to the Government.Observing China analyses British-Chinese relations and the People's Republic of China's international posture. The Broadside analyses world naval affairs.

In December 2025, the Council on Geostrategy published ‘Britain’s World: The strategy of security in 12 geopolitical maps’ with a foreword by General Sir Gwyn Jenkins, First Sea Lord and Chief of the Naval Staff.

== Podcast ==
The organisation produces a podcast, Defence Talks, in collaboration with BAE Systems and ADS Group, discussing geopolitics and defence. Which has featured guests including Prof. Peter Frankopan, British historian; Alex Baker MP, Member of the Defence Committee; and Gen. (rtd.) Philippe Lavigne, Supreme Allied Commander Transformation HQ (2021 - 2024).

== Other ==
The Council on Geostrategy published a Defence Pledge in April 2024 calling on all political parties to pledge 2.5% spending on defence in their manifesto. The Pledge received 30 signatures from senior Parliamentarians, Committee Chairs, former Defence Secretaries, and former leaders of the British Armed Forces.

== Advisory Board ==
The Council is guided by an Advisory Board, who provide their advice on a voluntary basis and their role may not always indicate agreement with every position taken by the organisation.

Political members include:

- Andrew Bowie MP, Member of Parliament for West Aberdeenshire and Kincardine.
- Emma Lewell MP, Member of Parliament for South Shields and member of the Defence Select Committee
- Richard Foord MP, Member of Parliament for Honiton and Sidmouth

== UK and International Partners ==
The council has a number of both UK and International Partners, including ADS Group, London Defence Conference, London International Shipping Week, Make UK, and the Pacific Future Forum.

== Funding ==
The Council receives funding from the UK Government through the Foreign, Commonwealth and Development Office, UK Ministry of Defence and Royal Navy; defence companies including Lockheed Martin UK and BAE Systems and others. As well as this, the Council receives funding through its membership programme.

Others include Capita Shared Services Ltd, Konrad-Adenauer-Stiftung UK & Ireland, and Helsing Ltd.

=== Membership ===
Membership categories include individual, executive individual, institutional, corporate/SME and bespoke packages. Members include individuals, a range of businesses, embassies and Whitehall departments.

== See also ==
- National Security Council (United Kingdom)
