= Simon Jupp =

British Conservative politician

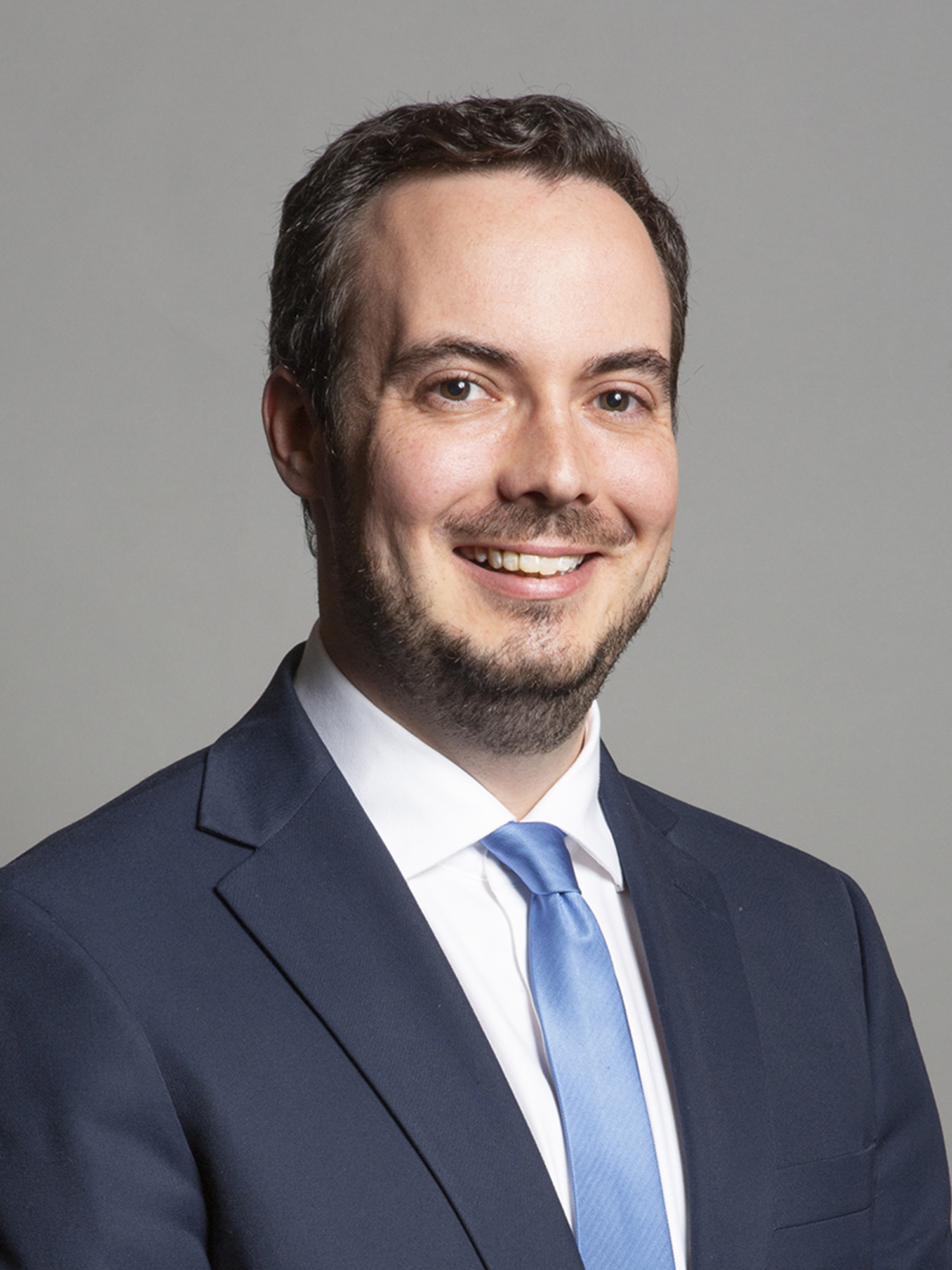

Member of Parliament for East Devon
- In office 12 December 2019 – 30 May 2024
- Preceded by: Sir Hugo Swire
- Succeeded by: Constituency abolished

Personal details
- Born: 8 September 1985 (age 41) Plymouth, Devon, England
- Party: Conservative
- Occupation: Politician
- Website: www.simonjupp.org.uk

Simon James Jupp (born 8 September 1985) is a British Conservative Party politician who was Member of Parliament (MP) for East Devon from the 2019 general election until the constituency was abolished in 2024.

== Early life and career ==
Simon Jupp was born on 8 September 1985 in Plymouth. As a teenager, he volunteered at a local radio station on weekends.

After college, he worked as a presenter for commercial radio stations in Devon, later becoming a journalist and manager for the BBC and ITV, before entering politics.

== Political career ==
Jupp joined the Conservative Campaign Headquarters press office as the head of broadcast in 2017. He was appointed as special adviser to Tim Bowles, the Mayor of the West of England in 2018. In 2019, he joined the Foreign and Commonwealth Office as a special adviser to the First Secretary of State and Foreign Secretary Dominic Raab.

At the 2019 general election, Jupp was elected to Parliament as MP for East Devon with 50.8% of the vote and a majority of 6,708 over independent candidate Claire Wright.

Jupp was elected by MPs to be a member of the Transport Select Committee in February 2020 and the Digital, Culture, Media and Sport Committee in September 2021. He previously served as a Parliamentary Private Secretary in the Department for Transport and Department for Levelling Up, Housing and Communities.

In November 2023, Jupp voted against a motion that would have called for an immediate ceasefire in the Gaza–Israel conflict.

Due to boundary changes and the abolition of East Devon at the 2024 general election, Jupp announced in early 2023 that he would be standing as a candidate in the new Honiton and Sidmouth constituency at the next general election. Honiton and Sidmouth also includes territory from Tiverton and Honiton.

In August 2023, Jupp was criticised for sending out a promotional political campaign leaflet designed to look like a fictional local newspaper called the East Devon Echo. Whilst appearing to be a local newspaper, complete with advertising, it instead contained a selection of articles showcasing Jupp’s activities and campaigns in East Devon, along with various items based on the Conservative party’s policies, whilst lacking any clear party branding. Information regarding the sender was limited to very small print at the bottom of the front page, indicating that it is being promoted by the EDCA (an abbreviation for the East Devon Conservative Association). The leaflet was posted to addresses in the new Sidmouth and Honiton constituency. Local newspapers, including the Midweek Herald and the Exmouth Journal, quoted Jupp as having talked about the importance of local news and ‘proper journalism’, while criticising ‘pseudo websites masquerading as legitimate sources of news’.

In April 2024, Jupp was accused of deceiving potential voters and members of the public after the registration of a number of different websites using the name of Richard Foord, Jupp's Liberal Democrat opponent and the outgoing MP for Tiverton and Honiton. Internet users typing in RichardFoord.uk, RichardFoord.co.uk or RichardFoord.com, or accidentally finding these websites via search wishing to reach Foord's genuine website, were instead redirected to Jupp's campaign website. On 7 April, when asked, Jupp told the BBC he was "not responsible for the web domains". The following day, the websites were found to have been disconnected. Jupp later admitted on 18 April, that one of his campaign staffers had registered the websites in his opponent's name. In response, Foord said that "links that look genuine but simply redirect to Conservative websites only serve to arouse suspicion and undermine trust. People deserve better from their MP."

In July 2024, Jupp lost his re-election bid in the Honiton and Sidmouth constituency to Richard Foord.

== Post-parliamentary career ==
In April 2025, it was reported that Jupp had joined utility company Pennon Group. Following his departure from Parliament, Jupp deleted critical statements regarding South West Water from his X account. Richard Foord, MP for Honiton & Sidmouth, stated: "The revolving door between water companies, regulators and government has to come to an end".

Parliament of the United Kingdom
Preceded by Hugo Swire	Member of Parliament for Devon East; 2019–2024	Succeeded by Constituency abolished
