= Environment, Food and Rural Affairs Select Committee =

UK House of Commons select committee

The Environment, Food and Rural Affairs Select Committee (EFRA) is a select committee of the House of Commons in the Parliament of the United Kingdom. The remit of the committee is to examine the expenditure, administration and policy of the Department for Environment, Food and Rural Affairs and its associated public bodies.

== Chairs ==
Committee chairs include those listed below.

Name	Start	End	Party	Constituency
Andrew Bennett	14 July 1997	1 June 2001	Labour	Denton and Reddish
David Curry	16 July 2001	12 November 2003	Conservative	Skipton and Ripon
Michael Jack	12 November 2003	6 May 2010	Conservative	Fylde
Anne McIntosh	10 June 2010	30 March 2015	Conservative	Thirsk and Malton
Neil Parish	18 June 2015	4 May 2022	Conservative	Tiverton and Honiton
Geraint Davies; Acting	4 May 2022	25 May 2022	Labour Co-op	Swansea West
Robert Goodwill	25 May 2022	30 May 2024	Conservative	Scarborough and Whitby
Alistair Carmichael	9 September 2024	present	Liberal Democrats	Orkney and Shetland

=== Chair election results ===
9 September 2024
Candidate	1st round	
Candidate	Votes	%
Alistair Carmichael	Unopposed	
Not redistributed		
Valid votes		

25 May 2022
Candidate	1st round		2nd round		3rd round		4th round	
Candidate	Votes	%	Votes	%	Votes	%	Votes	%
Sir Robert Goodwill	123	25.9	134	28.5	162	35.5	243	57.9
Dr Neil Hudson	126	26.6	130	27.6	164	36.0	177	42.1
Sir Geoffrey Clifton-Brown	101	21.3	108	22.9	130	28.5	Eliminated	
Anthony Mangnall	92	19.4	99	21.0	Eliminated			
Derek Thomas	32	6.8	Eliminated					
Not redistributed			3		18		54	
Valid votes	474		471		456		420	

28 January 2020
Candidate	1st round	
Candidate	Votes	%
Neil Parish	Unopposed	
Not redistributed		
Valid votes		

12 July 2017
Candidate	1st round	
Candidate	Votes	%
Neil Parish	324	57.0
Bill Wiggin	137	24.1
Zac Goldsmith	107	18.8
Not redistributed		
Valid votes	568	

17 June 2015
Candidate	1st round	
Candidate	Votes	%
Neil Parish	Unopposed	
Not redistributed		
Valid votes		

9 June 2010
Candidate	1st round		2nd round		3rd round	
Candidate	Votes	%	Votes	%	Votes	%
Anne McIntosh	215	38.7	239	44.8	266	53.2
Stewart Jackson	168	30.2	195	36.5	234	46.8
Neil Parish	87	15.6	100	18.7	Eliminated	
James Gray	86	15.5	Eliminated			
Not redistributed			22		34	
Valid votes	556		534		500	

== Current membership ==
Membership of the committee is as follows:

Member	Party	Constituency
Alistair Carmichael MP (Chair)	Liberal Democrats	Orkney and Shetland
Sarah Bool MP	Conservative	South Northamptonshire
Charlie Dewhirst MP	Conservative	Bridlington and The Wolds
Helena Dollimore MP	Labour	Hastings and Rye
Sarah Dyke MP	Liberal Democrats	Glastonbury and Somerton
Ben Goldsborough MP	Labour	South Norfolk
Terry Jermy MP	Labour	South West Norfolk
Jayne Kirkham MP	Labour	Truro and Falmouth
Josh Newbury MP	Labour	Cannock Chase
Henry Tufnell MP	Labour	Mid and South Pembrokeshire

=== Changes since 2024 ===
Date	Outgoing Member & Party	Constituency	→	New Member & Party	Constituency	Source
27 October 2025	Andrew Pakes MP (Labour)	Peterborough	→	Terry Jermy MP (Labour)	South West Norfolk	Hansard
17 November 2025	Helena Dollimore MP (Labour)	Hastings and Rye	→	Juliet Campbell MP (Labour)	Broxtowe	Hansard
22 June 2026	Tim Roca MP (Labour)	Macclesfield	→	Ben Goldsborough MP (Labour)	South Norfolk	Hansard
7 September 2026	Jenny Riddell-Carpenter MP (Labour)	Suffolk Coastal	→	Vacant		Hansard
26 October 2026	Juliet Campbell MP (Labour)	Broxtowe	→	Helena Dollimore MP (Labour)	Hastings and Rye	Hansard

== 2019-2024 Parliament ==
The chair was elected on 27 January 2020, with the members of the committee being announced on 2 March 2020.

Parish's resignation from the House of Commons became effective on 4 May 2022. Geraint Davies served as interim Chair until the election of Robert Goodwill as new committee Chairman.

Member	Party	Constituency
Neil Parish MP (Chair)	Conservative	Tiverton and Honiton
Geraint Davies MP	Labour Co-op	Swansea West
Dave Doogan MP	SNP	Angus
Rosie Duffield MP	Labour	Canterbury
Mary Glindon MP	Labour	North Tyneside
Neil Hudson MP	Conservative	Penrith and The Border
Robbie Moore MP	Conservative	Keighley
Sheryll Murray MP	Conservative	South East Cornwall
Toby Perkins MP	Labour	Chesterfield
Julian Sturdy MP	Conservative	York Outer
Derek Thomas MP	Conservative	St Ives

=== Changes 2019-2024 ===
Date	Outgoing Member & Party	Constituency	→	New Member & Party	Constituency	Source
11 May 2020	Toby Perkins MP (Labour)	Chesterfield	→	Ian Byrne MP (Labour)	Liverpool West Derby	Hansard
8 June 2020	Mary Glindon MP (Labour)	North Tyneside	→	Barry Gardiner MP (Labour)	Brent North	Hansard
5 January 2022	Dave Doogan MP (SNP)	Angus	→	Kirsty Blackman MP (SNP)	Aberdeen North	Hansard
4 May 2022	Neil Parish MP (Chair, Independent)	Tiverton and Honiton	→	Vacant		Resignation of member from Parliament
25 May 2022	Vacant		→	Robert Goodwill MP (Chair, Conservative)	Scarborough and Whitby	Hansard
8 November 2022	Kirsty Blackman MP (SNP)	Aberdeen North	→	Steven Bonnar MP (SNP)	Coatbridge, Chryston and Bellshill	Hansard
19 June 2023	Geraint Davies MP (Independent)	Swansea West	→	Cat Smith MP (Labour)	Lancaster and Fleetwood	Hansard
22 January 2024	Robbie Moore MP (Conservative)	Keighley	→	Selaine Saxby MP (Conservative)	North Devon	Hansard

== 2017-2019 Parliament ==
The chair was elected on 12 July 2017, with the members of the committee being announced on 11 September 2017.

Member	Party	Constituency
Neil Parish MP (Chair)	Conservative	Tiverton and Honiton
Alan Brown MP	SNP	Kilmarnock and Loudoun
John Grogan MP	Labour	Keighley
Paul Flynn MP	Labour	Newport West
Dr Caroline Johnson MP	Conservative	Sleaford and North Hykeham
Sandy Martin MP	Labour	Ipswich
Sheryll Murray MP	Conservative	South East Cornwall
David Simpson MP	DUP	Upper Bann
Angela Smith MP	Liberal Democrats	Penistone and Stocksbridge
Julian Sturdy MP	Conservative	York Outer

=== Changes 2017-2019 ===
Date	Outgoing Member & Party	Constituency	→	New Member & Party	Constituency	Source
4 December 2017	New seat		→	Jo Platt MP (Labour and Co-op)	Leigh	Hansard
11 December 2017	Jo Platt MP (Labour and Co-op)	Leigh	→	Kerry McCarthy MP (Labour)	Bristol East	Hansard
17 February 2019	Paul Flynn MP (Labour)	Newport West	→	Vacant		Death of member

== 2015-2017 Parliament ==
The chair was elected on 18 June 2015, with members being announced on 8 July 2015.

Member	Party	Constituency
Neil Parish MP (Chair)	Conservative	Tiverton and Honiton
Sarah Champion MP	Labour	Rotherham
Chris Davies MP	Conservative	Brecon and Radnorshire
Jim Fitzpatrick MP	Labour	Poplar and Limehouse
Harry Harpham MP	Labour	Sheffield Brightside and Hillsborough
Simon Hart MP	Conservative	Carmarthen West and South Pembrokeshire
Dr Paul Monaghan MP	SNP	Caithness, Sutherland and Easter Ross
Rebecca Pow MP	Conservative	Taunton Deane
Margaret Ritchie MP	SDLP	South Down
David Simpson MP	DUP	Upper Bann
Rishi Sunak MP	Conservative	Richmond (Yorks)

=== Changes 2015-2017 ===
Date	Outgoing Member & Party	Constituency	→	New Member & Party	Constituency	Source
26 October 2015	Sarah Champion MP (Labour)	Rotherham	→	Angela Smith MP (Labour)	Penistone and Stocksbridge	Hansard
4 February 2016	Harry Harpham MP (Labour)	Sheffield Brightside and Hillsborough	→	Vacant		Death of member
7 March 2016	Vacant		→	Valerie Vaz MP (Labour)	Walsall South	Hansard
31 October 2016	Valerie Vaz MP (Labour)	Walsall South	→	Kerry McCarthy MP (Labour)	Bristol East	Hansard

== 2010-2015 Parliament ==
The chair was elected on 10 June 2010, with members being announced on 12 July 2010.

Member	Party	Constituency
Anne McIntosh MP (Chair)	Conservative	Thirsk and Malton
Nigel Adams MP	Conservative	Selby and Ainsty
David Anderson MP	Labour	Blaydon
Tom Blenkinsop MP	Labour	Middlesbrough South and East Cleveland
Thomas Docherty MP	Labour	Dunfermline and West Fife
Bill Esterson MP	Labour	Sefton Central
George Eustice MP	Conservative	Camborne and Redruth
Mary Glindon MP	Labour	North Tyneside
Neil Parish MP	Conservative	Tiverton and Honiton
Dan Rogerson MP	Liberal Democrats	North Cornwall
Amber Rudd MP	Conservative	Hastings and Rye

=== Changes 2010-2015 ===
Date	Outgoing Member & Party	Constituency	→	New Member & Party	Constituency	Source
2 November 2010	Nigel Adams MP (Conservative)	Selby and Ainsty	→	Richard Drax MP (Conservative)	South Dorset	Hansard
22 December 2010	David Anderson MP (Labour)	Blaydon	→	Barry Gardiner MP (Labour)	Brent North	Hansard
27 June 2011	Bill Esterson MP (Labour)	Sefton Central	→	Cathy Jamieson MP (Labour Co-op)	Kilmarnock and Loudoun	Hansard
23 January 2012	Tom Blenkinsop MP (Labour)	Middlesbrough South and East Cleveland	→	Iain McKenzie MP (Labour)	Inverclyde	Hansard
23 January 2012	Cathy Jamieson MP (Labour Co-op)	Kilmarnock and Loudoun	→	Margaret Ritchie MP (SDLP)	South Down	Hansard
5 November 2012	Amber Rudd MP (Conservative)	Hastings and Rye	→	Sheryll Murray MP (Conservative)	South East Cornwall	Hansard
10 June 2013	Thomas Docherty MP (Labour)	Dunfermline and West Fife	→	Emma Lewell-Buck MP (Labour)	South Shields	Hansard
4 November 2013	Barry Gardiner MP (Labour)	Brent North	→	Jim Fitzpatrick MP (Labour)	Poplar and Limehouse	Hansard
4 November 2013	George Eustice MP (Conservative)	Camborne and Redruth	→	Mark Spencer MP (Conservative)	Sherwood	Hansard
25 November 2013	Dan Rogerson MP (Liberal Democrats)	North Cornwall	→	Roger Williams MP (Liberal Democrats)	Brecon and Radnorshire	Hansard

== See also ==
- Parliamentary committees of the United Kingdom
- Department for Environment, Food and Rural Affairs
