= Neil Parish =

British politician (born 1956)

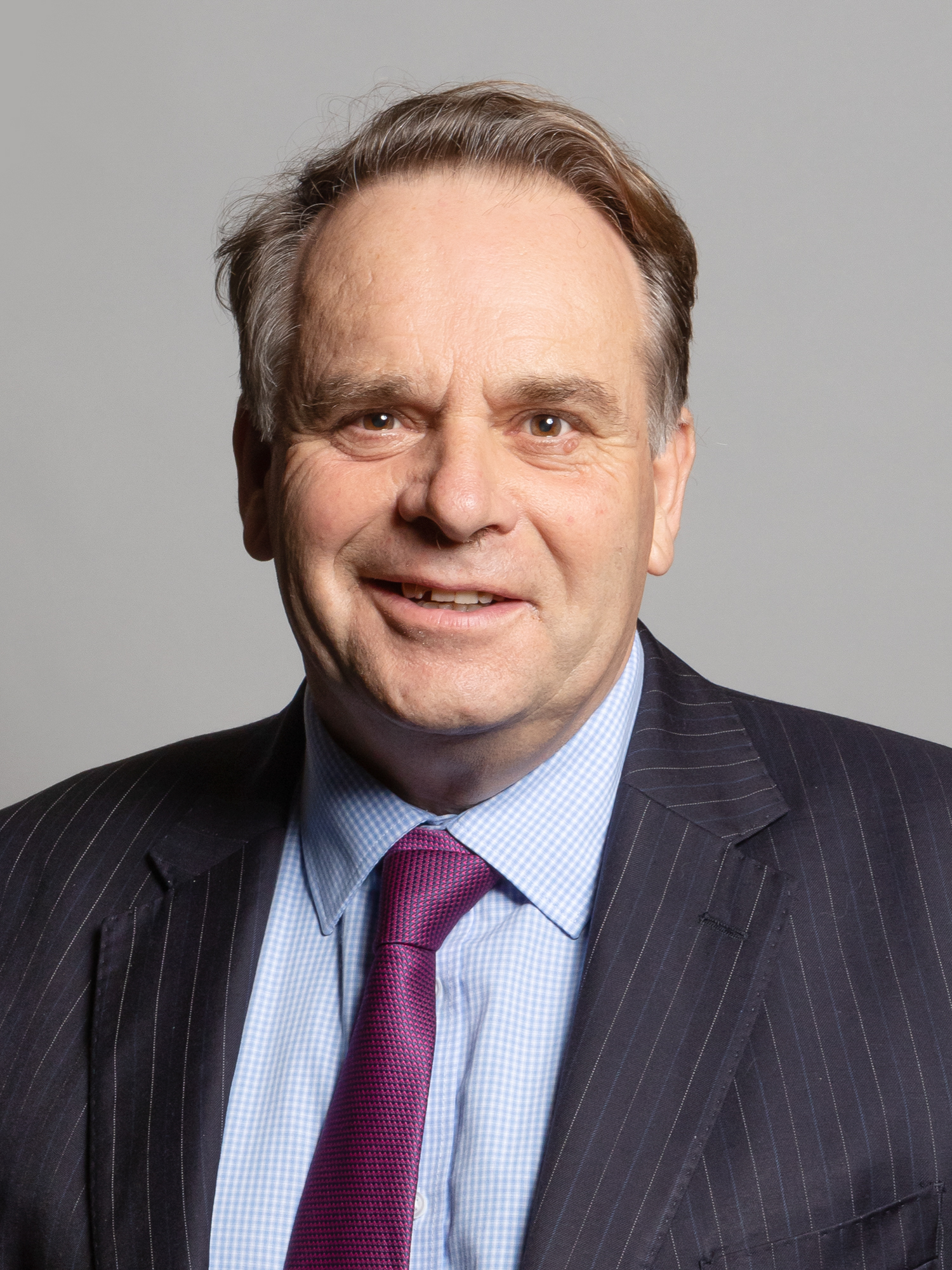
- Official portrait, 2020

Chair of the Environment, Food and Rural Affairs Select Committee
- In office 18 June 2015 – 4 May 2022
- Preceded by: Anne McIntosh
- Succeeded by: Geraint Davies (interim)

Member of Parliament for Tiverton and Honiton
- In office 6 May 2010 – 4 May 2022
- Preceded by: Angela Browning
- Succeeded by: Richard Foord

Member of the European Parliament for South West England
- In office 20 July 1999 – 14 July 2009
- Preceded by: Position established
- Succeeded by: Julie Girling

Personal details
- Born: Neil Quentin Gordon Parish; 26 May 1956 (age 70) Bridgwater, Somerset, England
- Party: Conservative
- Spouse: Susan Gail (m. 1981)
- Children: 2

Neil Quentin Gordon Parish (born 26 May 1956) is a British farmer and former politician who served as Member of Parliament (MP) for Tiverton and Honiton from 2010 until his resignation in 2022. A member of the Conservative Party, he was previously a member of the European Parliament (MEP) for South West England from 1999 to 2009. Parish chaired the Environment, Food and Rural Affairs Select Committee from 2015 until his resignation from the House of Commons.

In April 2022, Parish had the Conservative party whip suspended pending an investigation into allegations that he had watched pornography in the Commons chamber during a debate. After admitting to the allegations, he resigned as an MP. His departure triggered a by-election held on 23 June, which was won by the Liberal Democrat candidate, Richard Foord.

== Early life and career ==
Neil Quentin Gordon Parish was born in Bridgwater, Somerset, on 26 May 1956. Parish attended Brymore School, a local authority-run agricultural boarding school at Cannington near Bridgwater. In 1972, he left school at 16 to manage the family farm.

Parish began his career in politics in local government, serving from 1983 to 1995 as Councillor, Sedgemoor District Council; 1989–95 as Deputy leader, Sedgemoor District Council; 1989–93 as Councillor, Somerset County Council. In the 1997 general election, he contested Torfaen, a safe Labour seat in South Wales. Incumbent MP Paul Murphy defeated him by 24,536 votes.

== European Parliament ==
Parish was elected to the European Parliament for the South West England region in the 1999 election. He was re-elected in 2004 on the top of the Conservatives' party list.

Parish acted as an election monitor during the 2000 Zimbabwean parliamentary election and criticised the conduct of Robert Mugabe's government. During the 2008 Presidential election, Neil Parish called on the British Government to reject the legitimacy of ZANU-PF and to recognise Morgan Tsvangirai's Movement for Democratic Change – Tsvangirai party as the democratically elected Government of Zimbabwe. Parish was banned from re-entering Zimbabwe after voicing his criticism.

For his entire career in the European Parliament, he was a member of the Committee on Agriculture and Rural Development. From January 2007 to July 2009 he was chairman of that committee. In December 2001, he was appointed Conservative spokesman on agriculture and he was also the delegation's deputy chief whip. He was instrumental in setting up the year-long European Parliament's public inquiry into the 2007 United Kingdom foot-and-mouth outbreak, and he was also a member of the European Parliament's inquiry into the collapse of Equitable Life. He also served as a substitute member of the Committee on Fisheries.

During his time as chairman of the Committee on Agriculture and Rural Development, it was reported that David Miliband, at the time the Secretary of State for Environment, Food and Rural Affairs, had described Neil Parish as a "Rottweiler" for his dogged persistence.

In early 2007, Parish was selected as the Conservative prospective parliamentary candidate for Tiverton and Honiton. The seat's Conservative MP, Angela Browning, had announced in November 2006 she would not stand again. Parish did not stand for re-election in the 2009 European Parliament election.

== Member of Parliament ==
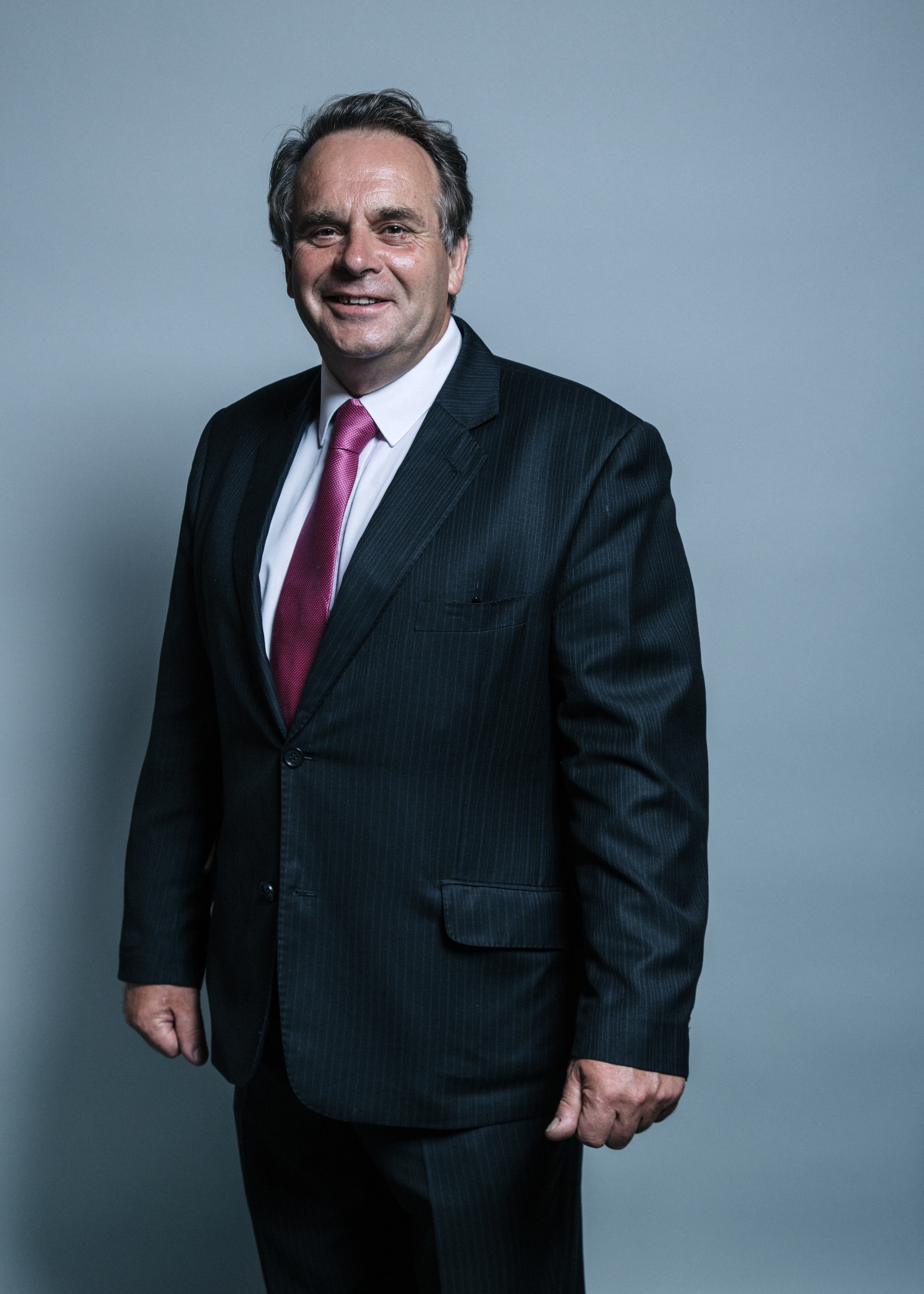
Official portrait, 2017

Parish was elected as Member of Parliament (MP) for Tiverton and Honiton on 6 May 2010. The Conservative vote increased by 3.6 per cent, with Parish attracting 27,614 votes – 50.3 per cent of the overall votes cast. He had a majority of 9,320 votes.

In June 2010, Parish was elected to the Environment, Food and Rural Affairs Select Committee. The committee is elected by the House of Commons to examine the expenditure, administration and policy of the Department for Environment, Food and Rural Affairs (Defra) and its associated public bodies including the Environment Agency and Natural England.

Parish was elected by Conservative backbenchers as chairman of the 1922 Committee environment policy committee in July 2010. The committee plays a role in policy formation and as a channel of communication between backbenchers and ministers. From 2010 to 2015, Parish was chairman of the Associate Parliamentary Group for Animal Welfare. Parish was one of 79 Conservative MPs who, on 24 October 2011, rebelled against a three-line whip by voting for a referendum on the UK's relationship with the European Union.

In July 2012, Parish relaunched and was elected the chairman of both the All-Party Parliamentary Group on Beef and Lamb and the All-Party Parliamentary Group on Pig and Poultry, which ensure that parliamentarians are briefed by industry experts on the latest developments in the industry, including supply chains, exports, sustainability, health and nutrition.

On 22 July 2014, Parish was appointed the parliamentary private secretary to John Hayes, Minister of State for Transport, who also acted as a senior advisor to the Prime Minister.

Parish opposes, and voted against the implementation of same-sex marriage, stating that he felt the issue was "for the Church and Christians to decide [upon], not for parliament to legislate." In 2014, Parish voted against enabling the courts to deal with proceedings for the divorce of a same-sex couple and against making same-sex marriage available to armed forces personnel outside the UK.

After the 2015 general election, he was returned unopposed as the chairman of the Environment, Food and Rural Affairs Select Committee. Parish was opposed to Brexit prior to the 2016 referendum. In 2016 also, he received the annual Dairy UK Award together with Heather Wheeler MP for their support of dairy farmers and the industry. While an MP, Parish continued to live on his family farm in Somerset and declared a financial interest in it.

=== Pornography investigation ===
On 25 April 2022, a group of female Conservative MPs met with the Government Chief Whip Chris Heaton-Harris to complain about sexism in parliament. In the course of the discussion one female MP spoke out alleging that an unnamed male colleague had been watching pornography next to her in the House of Commons. Initial media reporting likewise did not name the MP. Before he had been publicly identified as the accused MP, Parish was interviewed on GB News and said that the MP should be "dealt with and dealt with seriously".

On 29 April Parish had the Conservative whip withdrawn after being accused of watching pornography on a personal mobile phone in the Commons chamber. Parish referred himself to the Commons Select Committee on Standards following the removal of the whip. The allegation was made by a female Conservative minister, and later corroborated by another unnamed MP.

Initially, Parish said that he might have viewed the pornography by mistake. He subsequently told the BBC that he had watched pornography in the Palace of Westminster on two occasions, first accidentally and then deliberately. He said that he had been initially looking at a website about tractors; allies of Parish suggested he may have been looking at Claas Dominator tractors, a brand of combine harvesters. According to Parish, he then reached "another website with a very similar name" and "watched for a bit". He said: "My crime – biggest crime – is that on another occasion I went in a second time ... that was [while] sitting waiting to vote."

On 30 April 2022, Parish announced his intention to resign as an MP, which triggered the 2022 Tiverton and Honiton by-election. Angela Rayner, the deputy leader of the Labour Party, tweeted: "He was looking for tractors but ended up with porn actors? Neil Parish must think you were all born yesterday." On 4 May, he was appointed Crown Steward and Bailiff of the Manor of Northstead, disqualifying him as an MP and vacating his seat. At the by-election, on 23 June, the Liberal Democrats won the seat for the first time in the area since 1923.

In an interview with LBC in June 2022, Parish said that he had experienced suicidal thoughts after the incident and that the police had "very kindly and rightly" confiscated his guns to prevent him from killing himself. He also said that he had experienced death threats over the incident. Parish additionally commented that he "was wrong to be watching [pornography]" and that what he did was "very immoral" but not illegal. When asked if he had been "done in" by some of his colleagues, he replied: "I think probably I was."

=== Post-parliamentary career ===
In January 2024, Parish launched the We Can Do Both podcast, focusing on the balance between food production and environmental protection, drawing on his experience as a farmer.

Parish has also been an outspoken critic of the inheritance tax reforms proposed in 2024, particularly regarding their impact on farms. He participated in farmers’ protests and appeared on GB News to voice his opposition to the changes.

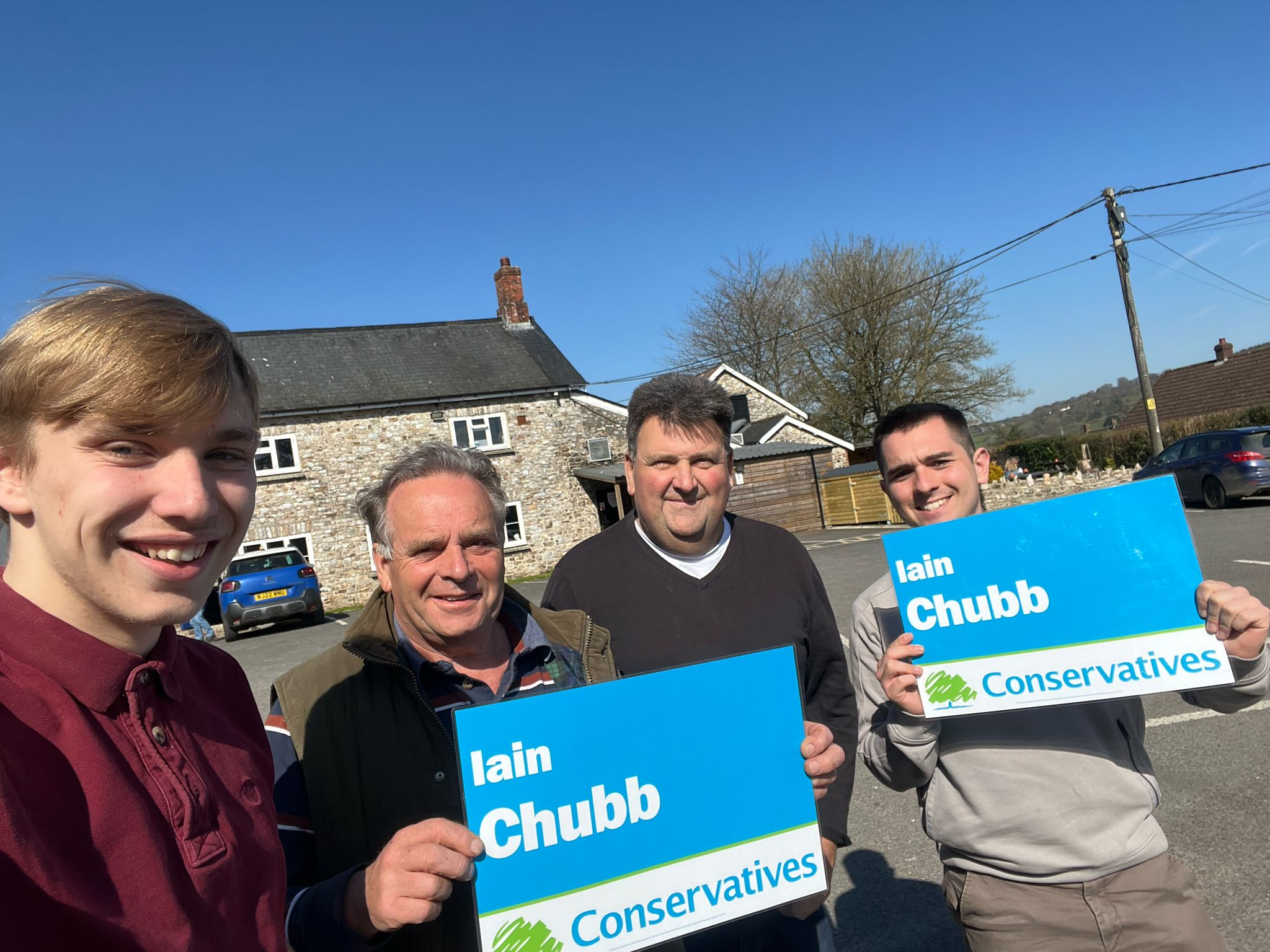
Parish campaigning with local Conservatives in support of Iain Chubb, candidate for Whimple and Blackdown, ahead of the 2025 Devon County Council elections (April 2025).

Although he stepped back from frontline politics following his resignation in 2022, Parish has remained active within the Conservative Party. In 2025, he attended an event with the Honiton and Sidmouth Conservatives to discuss concerns about the inheritance tax’s effect on Devon farmers. He also took part in campaign activities with local Conservative candidates ahead of the 2025 Devon County Council elections, supporting campaigns in Mid and East Devon. On 16 May 2026, he became Honorary President of the Honiton and Sidmouth Conservatives, succeeding Simon Card.

== Personal life ==
In 1981 Parish married Susan Gail, whom he employed as a junior secretary while serving as an MP, later, a teacher. The couple have a son and a daughter, and two grandchildren.

== See also ==
- Karnataka video clip controversy, a similar scandal in India

Parliament of the United Kingdom
Preceded by Angela Browning	Member of Parliament for Tiverton and Honiton; 2010–2022	Succeeded by Richard Foord
