= Simon Lightwood =

British politician (born 1980)

Simon Lightwood MP
- Official portrait, 2026

Parliamentary Under-Secretary of State for Local Transport and Sustainability
- Incumbent
- Assumed office 22 July 2026
- Prime Minister: Andy Burnham
- Preceded by: Lilian Greenwood
- In office 9 July 2024 – 7 September 2025
- Prime Minister: Keir Starmer
- Preceded by: Guy Opperman
- Succeeded by: Lilian Greenwood

Parliamentary Under-Secretary of State for Equalities
- Incumbent
- Assumed office 22 July 2026
- Prime Minister: Andy Burnham
- Preceded by: Olivia Bailey

Parliamentary Under-Secretary of State for Roads and Buses
- In office 7 September 2025 – 22 July 2026
- Prime Minister: Keir Starmer
- Preceded by: Lilian Greenwood
- Succeeded by: Justin Madders

Shadow Minister for Local Transport (Note: Shadow Minister for Buses and Taxis (2022–23))
- In office 27 September 2022 – 5 July 2024
- Leader: Keir Starmer
- Preceded by: Sam Tarry
- Succeeded by: Kieran Mullan

Member of Parliament for Wakefield and Rothwell Wakefield (2022–2024)
- Incumbent
- Assumed office 23 June 2022
- Preceded by: Imran Ahmad Khan
- Majority: 9,346 (23.1%)

Personal details
- Born: Simon Robert Lightwood; 15 December 1980 (age 45) South Shields, Tyne and Wear, England
- Party: Labour Co-op
- Children: 2
- Education: Bretton Hall College (BA)
- Website: www.simonlightwood.org.uk

Simon Robert Lightwood (born 15 December 1980) is a British Labour and Co-operative Party politician serving as Member of Parliament (MP) for Wakefield and Rothwell since 2024. From a 2022 by-election until 2024, he represented Wakefield. He has served as Parliamentary Under-Secretary of State for Transport since July 2024, having previously been Shadow Minister for Local Transport from 2022 until 2024.

== Early life and education ==
Lightwood was born in 1980 and grew up in South Shields. After his family home was repossessed when he was aged 13, the family was forced to live with his grandmother. Lightwood has a degree in theatre acting from Bretton Hall College and bought his first house in Wakefield.

== Early career ==
Lightwood was a case worker for the former Wakefield MP Mary Creagh, between 2005 and 2009. He later worked for the National Health Service, and has served on the Labour Party's National Policy Forum as a Yorkshire representative. At the time of running for parliament, he was Head of Communications for Calderdale and Huddersfield NHS Foundation Trust.

== Parliamentary career ==
On 3 May 2022, Imran Ahmad Khan resigned as MP for Wakefield after being convicted of sexually assaulting a teenage boy, thus forcing a by-election. At the by-election held on 23 June 2022, Lightwood was elected as MP with a 4,925 majority, after being imposed on the local Labour Party against their wishes. The entire executive of the local Labour Party resigned in protest.

At the 2022 Labour Party Conference, Lightwood was appointed Shadow Minister for Local Transport.

In the 2024 general election, Lightwood was re-elected as the MP for the new parliamentary constituency of Wakefield and Rothwell with a majority of 9,346.

Following the Labour Party victory in the 2024 general election, he was appointed Parliamentary Under-Secretary of State for Transport (Local Transport Minister).

== Personal life ==
Lightwood is openly gay. Lightwood lives in Ossett, with his husband and two children, having pledged to move from his previous home in Calderdale to the Wakefield district following his election.

== Notes ==
Parliament of the United Kingdom
Preceded by Imran Ahmad Khan	Member of Parliament for Wakefield; 2022–2024	Constituency abolished
New constituency	Member of Parliament for Wakefield and Rothwell; 2024–present	Incumbent
