= Neil Hudson (politician) =

British Conservative politician

Neil Hudson MP FRCVS
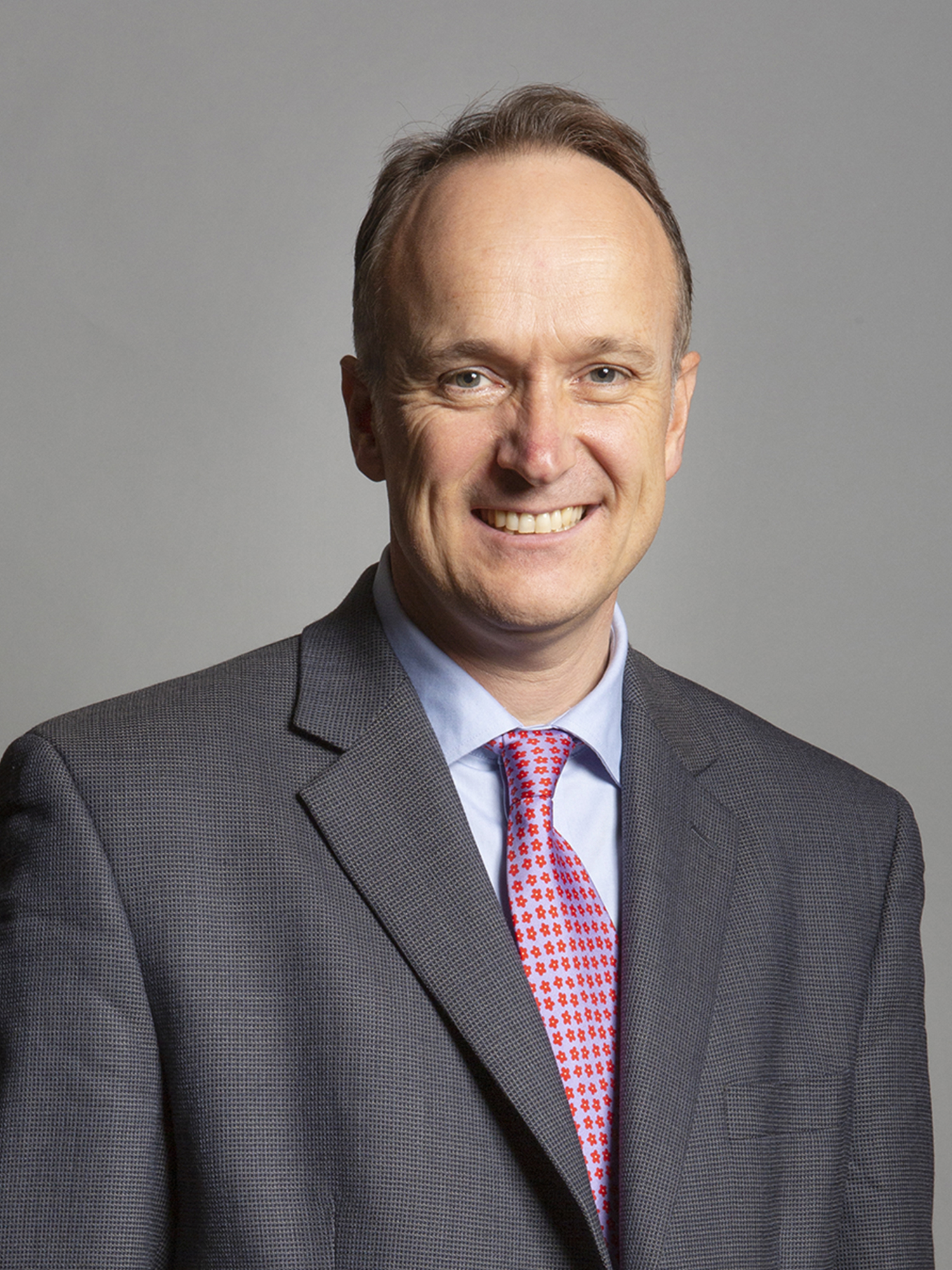
- Official portrait, 2019

Shadow Minister for Environment, Food and Rural Affairs
- Incumbent
- Assumed office 8 November 2024
- Leader: Kemi Badenoch
- Preceded by: Office established

Member of Parliament
- Incumbent
- Assumed office 12 December 2019
- Preceded by: Rory Stewart
- Constituency: Penrith and The Border (2019–2024); Epping Forest (2024–present)
- Majority: 5,682 (13.6%)

Personal details
- Born: Neil Peter Hammerton Hudson; 1969 (age 56–57) Islington, London, England
- Party: Conservative
- Children: 2
- Education: Queens' College, Cambridge (BA); University of Edinburgh (PhD)
- Occupation: Politician; Academic; Veterinary Surgeon
- Website: www.neilhudson.org.uk

Neil Peter Hammerton Hudson FRCVS (born 1969) is a British Conservative Party politician, academic, and veterinary surgeon who has served as the Member of Parliament (MP) for Epping Forest since 2024, and previously for Penrith and The Border from 2019 to 2024.

He served on the Environment, Food and Rural Affairs Committee for four years, beginning in 2020, and was appointed Shadow Minister for Environment, Food and Rural Affairs in November 2024. He is the first vet elected to the House of Commons since 1884.

== Early life and career ==
Neil Hudson was born in 1969 in Islington, north London, and grew up in the Epping Forest area of Essex, where his family had longstanding roots.

He is the son of obstetrics and gynaecology professor Christopher Hudson and nurse Caryl Shaw. Hudson has a sister Jayne who works as a physiotherapist and brother Grahame who is an associate head at De Montfort University.

Hudson's father, Professor Christopher Hudson, was a consultant obstetrician and gynaecologist at Barts Hospital, with a distinguished career in clinical practice and medical research. Beyond his medical career, Professor Hudson served as a parish councillor for North Weald Bassett, representing the Thornwood ward, and was a member of the Board of Governors at Epping St John's School.

Hudson's paternal grandfather served as a Royal Air Force pilot and was stationed at North Weald Airfield from 1928.

Hudson studied at Chigwell School and Queens' College, Cambridge, which was the alma mater of his father, qualifying from the veterinary school in 1994. While there he was in the Footlights theatrical group and was in charge of auditions. He later performed four times at the Edinburgh Festival Fringe.

Hudson completed an internship at the University of Sydney, gaining a diploma in 1995, and later a PhD in Grass Sickness and Equine Gastroenterology at the University of Edinburgh. Hudson is a senior lecturer at the Royal (Dick) School of Veterinary Studies but, after becoming an MP, he has been on sabbatical leave since January 2020. He became a Fellow of the Royal College of Veterinary Surgeons in 2018.

== Parliamentary career ==
Hudson reports that he first became interested in becoming a politician following the 2001 United Kingdom foot-and-mouth outbreak.

At the 2005 general election, Hudson stood as the Conservative candidate in Newcastle upon Tyne North, coming third with 15.7% of the vote behind the incumbent Labour MP Doug Henderson and the Liberal Democrat candidate.

Hudson stood in Edinburgh South at the 2010 general election, coming third with 21.6% of the vote behind the Labour candidate Ian Murray and the Liberal Democrat candidate. In the 2010 election, his brother Grahame also stood as a candidate but for the Liberal Democrats in Rutland and Melton.

Hudson was elected to Parliament as MP for Penrith and The Border at the 2019 general election with 60.4% of the vote and a majority of 18,519.

Upon his election to Parliament, Hudson became a member of the Environment, Food and Rural Affairs Select Committee.

Hudson announced in September 2021 that he no longer supported the building of the Woodhouse Colliery, a proposed coal mine in Cumbria. The project was approved by the government in December 2022.

As part of the 2023 review of Westminster constituencies, Penrith and The Border was abolished and he lost selection for the new seat of Penrith and Solway in February 2023 to fellow Conservative MP Mark Jenkinson. Hudson also lost out on the selection for the West Suffolk seat in July 2023 to former political adviser Nick Timothy. West Suffolk MP Matt Hancock had previously announced that he would stand down at the 2024 general election in December 2022.

At the 2024 general election, Hudson was elected to Parliament as MP for Epping Forest with 43.2% of the vote and a majority of 5,682.

== Personal life ==
Hudson is married to Nicola Chedgey. They have two children. His late father Professor Chris Hudson was a councillor in North Weald, Essex.

Parliament of the United Kingdom
Preceded by Rory Stewart	Member of Parliament for Penrith and The Border; 2019–2024	Constituency abolished
Preceded by Eleanor Laing	Member of Parliament for Epping Forest; 2024–present	Incumbent
