= Angela Browning =

British Conservative politician (born 1946)

The Right Honourable The Baroness Browning
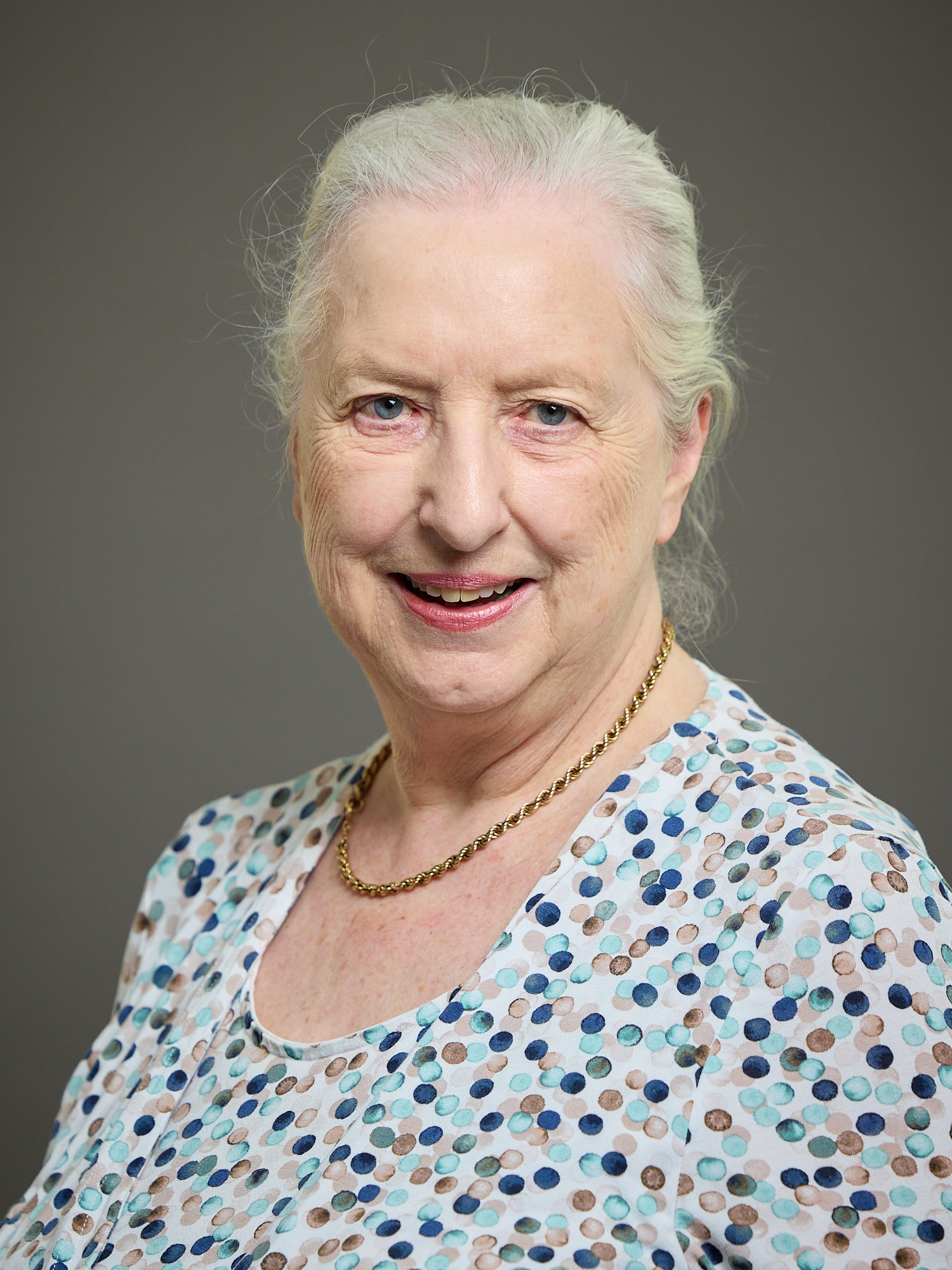
- Official portrait, 2025

Minister of State for Crime Prevention and Antisocial Behaviour Reduction
- In office 1 May 2011 – 16 September 2011
- Prime Minister: David Cameron
- Preceded by: James Brokenshire
- Succeeded by: The Lord Henley

Member of the House of Lords
- Lord Temporal
- Life peerage 9 July 2010

Member of Parliament for Tiverton and Honiton Tiverton (1992–1997)
- In office 9 April 1992 – 12 April 2010
- Preceded by: Robin Maxwell-Hyslop
- Succeeded by: Neil Parish

Shadow cabinet posts
- 1997–1998: Shadow Minister for Schools, Disabled People and Women
- 1999–2000: Shadow Secretary of State for Trade and Industry
- 2000–2001: Constitutional Affairs spokesperson
- 2000–2001: Shadow Leader of the House of Commons
- 2000–2001: Shadow Chancellor of the Duchy of Lancaster

Personal details
- Born: Angela Pearson; 4 December 1946 (age 79) Reading, Berkshire, England
- Party: Conservative
- Spouse: David Browning
- Education: University of West London; Bournemouth University

Angela Frances Browning, Baroness Browning (née Pearson; born 4 December 1946) is a British Conservative Party politician. She was the Member of Parliament (MP) for Tiverton and Honiton from 1997 to 2010, having previously been MP for Tiverton from 1992 to 1997.

== Early life ==
Angela Frances Pearson was born in Reading, Berkshire. Her father was a lab technician at the University of Reading. She was educated at the Westwood Grammar School for Girls (a Grammar School, now called King's Academy Prospect) on Honey End Lane in Reading, University of West London, and the Bournemouth College of Technology.

She worked in adult education as a Home Economics tutor from 1968 until 1974. She was an auxiliary nurse for a year in 1976, and was appointed as a sales and training manager with GEC Hotpoint in 1977. In 1985, she became a self-employed management consultant, and also became Director of the Small Business Bureau until 1994. From 1988 to 1992, she was the chairman of Women into Business.

== Political career ==
Browning contested Crewe and Nantwich at the 1987 general election, but was narrowly defeated by the veteran Labour MP Gwyneth Dunwoody by just 1,092 votes. She was selected for the safe Conservative seat of Tiverton following the retirement of Robin Maxwell-Hyslop, who had represented the seat for 32 years. She held the seat comfortably at the 1992 general election with a majority of 11,089. She made her maiden speech on 12 June 1992.

Following her election, Browning became a Member of the Agriculture Select committee in 1992. She was appointed the Parliamentary Private Secretary to the Minister of State at the Department for Education and Employment Michael Forsyth in 1993. Also in 1993, she became the President of the National Autistic Society. She entered John Major's government in 1994 when she became a Parliamentary Under-Secretary of State at the Ministry for Agriculture, Fisheries and Food, where she remained until the Major government fell. She became a vice president of the National Alzheimer's Disease Society in 1997.

Her Tiverton seat was abolished, but she won the nomination for the newly drawn Tiverton and Honiton seat which she contested at the 1997 general election. She won the new seat with a sharply reduced majority of 1,653.

After John Major resigned from the Leadership of the Conservative Party she ran the John Redwood campaign team. She was appointed as an opposition spokeswoman on Education and Employment under William Hague, but she stepped down in 1998 to look after her autistic adult son, Robin. However, Hague brought her back in 1999 when she entered the Shadow cabinet as the Shadow Trade and Industry Secretary, and, in 2000, was the Shadow Leader of the House of Commons. Following the 2001 general election, she was briefly an opposition spokesperson on Constitutional Affairs, before becoming the Vice Chairman of the Conservative Party 2000–04.

In the 2005 general election, Browning increased her majority to 11,051; almost the majority of the original Tiverton seat she took in 1992.

She was a Member of both the Public Accounts and Standards and Privileges Select Committees.

On 17 November 2006, Browning announced her intention not to stand as a candidate at the 2010 general election.

=== House of Lords ===
On 9 July 2010, she was created a life peer as Baroness Browning, of Whimple in the County of Devon, and was introduced in the House of Lords on 13 July 2010, where she sits as a Conservative.

On 11 May 2011, it was announced that Lady Browning would replace James Brokenshire as the Minister for Crime Prevention and Anti-Social Behaviour Reduction in the coalition government following the resignation of Lady Neville-Jones as Security Minister. Lady Browning also became the Home Office Minister of State in the House of Lords, making her the lead for all Home Office business in the Upper House.

She resigned from government on health grounds on 16 September 2011, remaining a member of the House of Lords, and was replaced in the Home Office by Lord Henley.

She was interviewed in 2015 as part of The History of Parliament's oral history project.

== Personal life ==
She married David Browning on 6 January 1968 in Bournemouth. They have two sons.

Parliament of the United Kingdom
Preceded by Robin Maxwell-Hyslop	Member of Parliament for Tiverton; 1992–1997	Constituency abolished
New constituency	Member of Parliament for Tiverton and Honiton; 1997–2010	Succeeded by Neil Parish
Political offices
Preceded by Tom Clarke	Shadow Minister for Schools, Disabled People and Women; 1997–1998	Succeeded by Theresa May
Preceded by John Redwood	Shadow Secretary of State for Trade and Industry; 1999–2000	Succeeded by David Heathcoat-Amory
Preceded by George Young	Shadow Leader of the House of Commons; 2000–2001	Succeeded by Eric Forth
Preceded by George Young	Shadow Chancellor of the Duchy of Lancaster; 2000–2001	Succeeded by Eric Forth
Preceded by James Brokenshire	Minister of State for Crime Prevention and Antisocial Behaviour Reduction; 2011	Succeeded by The Lord Henley
