= 2022 Wakefield by-election =

UK parliamentary by-election

- 23 June 2022

Wakefield constituency
- Registered: 69,601
- Turnout: 39.1% (▼25.0 pp)
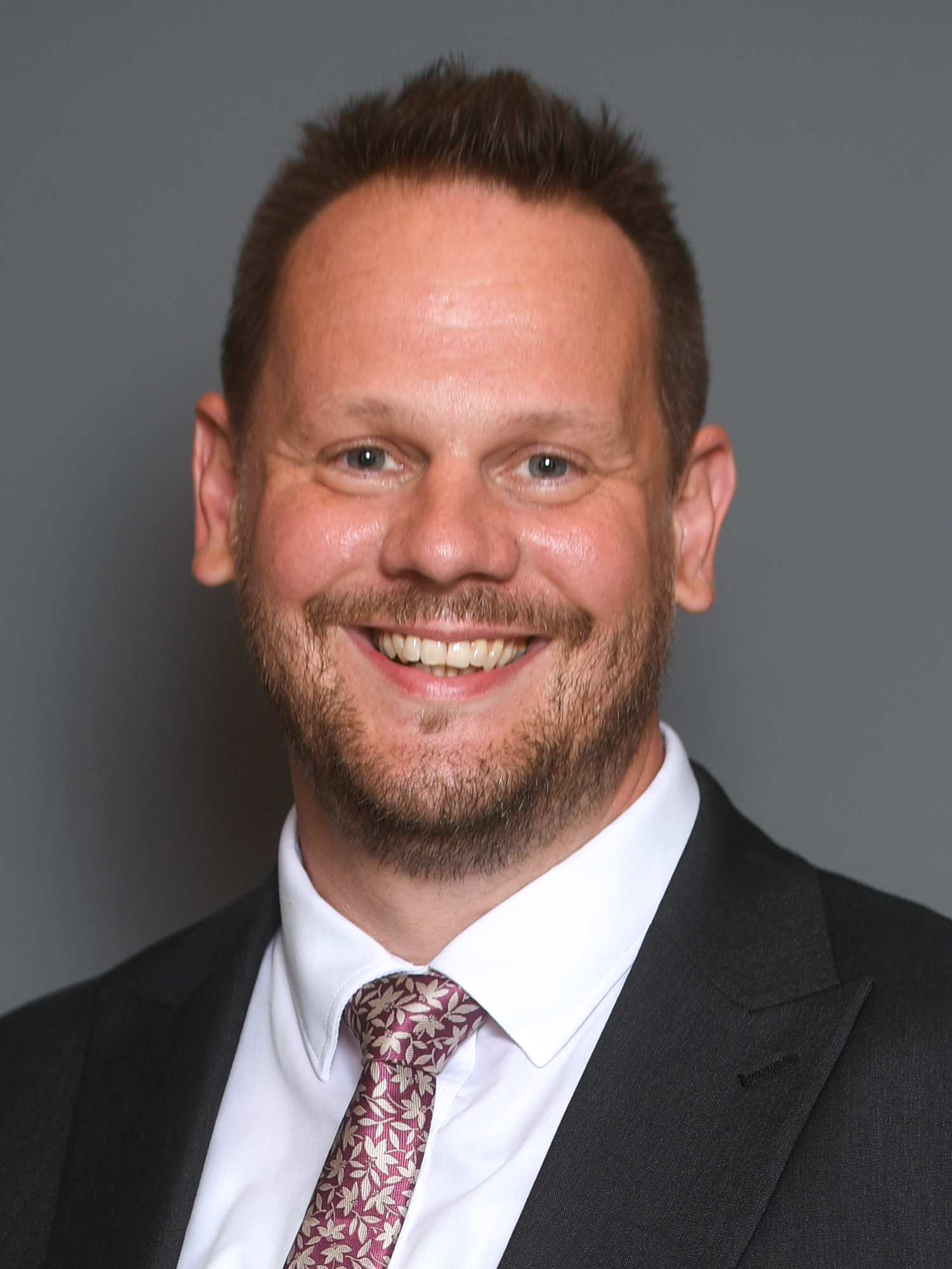
	First party	Second party	Third party
Candidate	Simon Lightwood	Nadeem Ahmed	Akef Akbar
Party	Labour-Co-op	Conservative	Independent
Popular vote	13,166	8,241	2,090
Percentage	47.9%	30.0%	7.7%
Swing	▲8.6 pp	▼17.0 pp	New
MP before election
Imran Ahmad Khan
Conservative
Elected MP
Simon Lightwood
Labour

A by-election for the United Kingdom parliamentary constituency of Wakefield was held on 23 June 2022, triggered by the resignation of incumbent Member of Parliament (MP) Imran Ahmad Khan following a criminal conviction for child sexual assault. It was won by Simon Lightwood of the Labour Party, and was the first by-election gain made by Labour since 2012.

Khan was elected as a Conservative Party candidate at the 2019 general election. He lost the whip in June 2021 after being charged with sexually assaulting a 15-year-old boy in 2008, and sat as an independent thereafter. He was convicted in April 2022, and resigned his seat. Khan was subsequently jailed for 18 months.

It was held on the same day as the 2022 Tiverton and Honiton by-election, which the Conservatives lost to the Liberal Democrats. This marked the first time since the 1991 Kincardine and Deeside and Langbaurgh by-elections that the UK government had lost two seats at two by-elections held on the same day.

== Background ==
Boundary of Wakefield constituency in West Yorkshire

=== Constituency ===
Wakefield lies in the county of West Yorkshire. The seat covers most of Wakefield itself (besides the Wakefield South ward), the small towns of Ossett and Horbury, and the more rural parishes of Crigglestone, Sitlington, West Bretton and Woolley. In the 2016 EU referendum, 63% of the voters who turned out voted to leave the European Union.

The by-election was expected to be the ninth or tenth of the 2019 Parliament. Before Ahmad Khan won the seat for the Conservatives at the 2019 general election, it had been held by the Labour Party since the 1932 Wakefield by-election, when Labour gained the seat from the Conservatives. The seat is regarded as part of the so-called "red wall", and Labour hoped to regain it.

=== Trigger ===
Ahmad Khan was first elected as the Conservative MP for Wakefield in the 2019 general election. He lost the whip in June 2021 after being charged with sexually assaulting a 15-year-old boy in 2008. He sat as an independent for the remaining months of his tenure as MP. He was convicted of the assault on 11 April 2022 and expelled from the party, announcing his intention to resign as an MP on 14 April 2022. On 25 April, Khan submitted his resignation, effective from 30 April, enabling him to claim his full pay as MP for the month. On 3 May Khan was appointed as Steward and Bailiff of the Three Hundreds of Chiltern, officially ceasing to be an MP. On 23 May Khan was sentenced to 18 months in prison.

On 17 May the writ of election was moved by the Chief Whip, Chris Heaton-Harris, formally triggering the by-election. It was scheduled to be held on 23 June 2022, the same day as the Tiverton and Honiton by-election.

== Candidates ==
=== Conservative Party ===
The Daily Telegraph reported that Lord Frost was being urged by his allies to stand in the seat. In its Steerpike opinion piece, The Spectator discussed the prospect of Frost being the Conservative candidate, noting the Telegraph's support for the idea.

On 20 May 2022, the Conservatives published a shortlist of three candidates: Nadeem Ahmed, a Conservative councillor for Wakefield South ward and Leader of the Wakefield Conservative group from 2014 to 2021; Laura Weldon, council candidate for Wakefield West in the 2022 election and former Deputy Leader of the Yorkshire Party; and Tanya Graham, previously the Conservative candidate for Bradford South in both the 2015 and 2017 elections. Ahmed was chosen as the candidate on 22 May.

=== Labour Party ===
Mary Creagh, Labour MP for the constituency until the 2019 general election, confirmed in a statement on Twitter that she would not be seeking to be the party's candidate for the by-election. Sources within the Labour Party initially suggested that Ed Balls, former minister and MP for neighbouring Morley and Outwood, could be a potential candidate in the by-election with the backing of former Prime Minister Gordon Brown, as reported by Politico and The Times. Balls responded on social media that he would not be putting his name forward as the Labour candidate.

In March 2022, LabourList wrote that Jack Hemingway, deputy leader of Wakefield Council, was considered the frontrunner, but his name ultimately did not appear on the longlist, nor did three other local candidates who had put their names forward. This was criticised by the local party for contradicting one of Keir Starmer's ten pledges during the 2020 Labour leadership election: "The selections for Labour candidates needs to be more democratic and we should end NEC impositions of candidates. Local Party members should select their candidates for every election."

The party announced four candidates for the longlist: Community Union employee Kate Dearden; Sam Howarth, an employee of Barnsley Central MP Dan Jarvis who previously worked for Jenny Chapman; NHS worker Simon Lightwood, who formerly worked as a staffer for Creagh; and Rachael Kenningham.

Wakefield Constituency Labour Party (CLP) selected Dearden and Lightwood for the shortlist, but the following day, the entire CLP executive committee (barring one externally appointed individual) resigned in protest at the absence of any candidates on the list who lived in Wakefield. In a statement, they said: "We asked for local candidates, but there are none. Three prominent council and local Labour candidates, including the deputy council leader didn't even make it onto the 'long list'. A short list of four was requested by our representative on the panel to give members some choice but the NEC members insisted on just two."

Lightwood was selected on 15 May on a turnout of 23% of local party members. The local Labour committee walked out of the room, but The Guardian reported that "several officers appeared to be uneasy about the walkout".

=== Other parties ===
The Yorkshire Party selected the Crigglestone-based former Conservative councillor David Herdson as their candidate. Herdson and independent candidate, Akef Akbar, are both former Conservative Party councillors.

The Liberal Democrats selected Jamie Needle as their candidate. Needle previously contested the constituency in 2019.

In May 2022, George Galloway, who ran in the 2021 Batley and Spen by-election, suggested he might stand in this by-election for the Workers Party, but ultimately he did not declare.

The Green Party selected Ashley Routh as their candidate. Reform UK selected Chris Walsh as their candidate. Britain First selected Ashlea Simon as their candidate.

== Opinion polls ==
Pollster	Client	Date(s) conducted	Sample size	Con	Lab	Reform	Lib Dem	Green	Others	Lead
2022 by-election		23 Jun 2022	–	30.0%	47.9%	1.9%	1.8%	2.1%	16.3%	17.9%
Survation	38 Degrees	24 May – 1 Jun 2022	519	33%	56%	3%	2%	2%	5% (Note: 3% Independent, 1% Yorkshire Party, 1% Britain First)	23%
JL Partners	The Times	13–22 May 2022	501	28%	48%	3%	7%	8%	6%	20%
2019 general election		12 Dec 2019	–	47.3%	39.8%	6.1%	3.9%	–	2.9%	7.5%

== Result ==
Bar chart of the election result

The by-election was won by Labour with a majority of 4,925 votes, or 17.9 percentage points, with a swing of 12.7% from the Conservatives towards Labour.

2022 Wakefield by-election
Party	Candidate	Votes	%	±%
Labour Co-op	Simon Lightwood	13,166	47.9	+8.1
Conservative	Nadeem Ahmed	8,241	30.0	–17.3
Independent	Akef Akbar	2,090	7.6	N/A
Yorkshire	David Herdson	1,182	4.3	+2.4
Green	Ashley Routh	587	2.1	New
Reform	Chris Walsh	513	1.9	–4.2
Liberal Democrats	Jamie Needle	508	1.8	–2.1
Britain First	Ashlea Simon	311	1.1	New
Freedom Alliance	Mick Dodgson	187	0.7	New
Monster Raving Loony	Sir Archibald Stanton Earl 'Eaton	171	0.6	New
CPA	Paul Bickerdike	144	0.5	New
English Democrat	Thérèse Hirst	135	0.5	New
UKIP	Jordan Gaskell	124	0.5	New
NIP	Christopher Jones	84	0.3	New
Independent	Jayda Fransen	23	0.1	N/A
Majority		4,925	17.9	N/A
Turnout		27,466	39.5	–24.6
Registered electors		69,601		
Labour gain from Conservative		Swing	+12.7	

== Previous result ==
General election 2019: Wakefield
Party	Candidate	Votes	%	±%
Conservative	Imran Ahmad Khan	21,283	47.3	+2.3
Labour	Mary Creagh	17,925	39.8	–9.9
Brexit Party	Peter Wiltshire	2,725	6.1	New
Liberal Democrats	Jamie Needle	1,772	3.9	+1.9
Yorkshire	Ryan Kett	868	1.9	–0.6
Independent	Stephen Whyte	454	1.0	N/A
Majority		3,358	7.5	N/A
Turnout		45,027	64.1	–1.7
Conservative gain from Labour		Swing	+6.1	

== Reactions ==
Labour leader Keir Starmer said the election was a judgment on the Tories and Boris Johnson, and "if they had any decency they would get out of the way for the sake of the country". He said the result put Labour on track to form a government. He also said the people of Wakefield had exercised a judgment of no confidence in the Conservative government.

Political scientist Sir John Curtice noted that of five consecutive by-elections defended by the Tories, they had only successfully defended one of them. He stated that the average drop in support in those five by-elections, of 20%, was the worst by-election record by a governing party since John Major's government. However, Curtice also wrote that it was unclear whether enthusiasm for Labour had materialised as in Tony Blair's 1997 victory, and that Labour's victory was more due to tactical voting against the Conservatives. He pointed to Labour's smaller vote share than their 2017 performance in the constituency as well as some "disaffected" Tories voting for independent Akef Akbar instead.

Simon Lightwood, the new MP, pledged in his victory speech to "restore trust" in politics, saying the result showed that Wakefield voters had tired of the "deceit and dishonesty of this [Conservative] government".

In the wake of Conservative losses in both Wakefield and Tiverton and Honiton, Oliver Dowden resigned from his roles as Conservative Party Co-Chairman and Minister without Portfolio, stating: "We cannot carry on with business as usual. Someone must take responsibility".
