= Tiverton and Honiton =

UK Parliament constituency (1997–2024)

Coordinates: 50.827°N 3.349°W

- Former county constituency for the House of Commons
- Boundary of Tiverton and Honiton in Devon

- Location of Devon within England
- County: Devon
- Electorate: 75,839 (December 2010)
- Major settlements: Tiverton, Honiton, Axminster, Seaton and Cullompton

1997–2024
- Seats: One
- Created from: Tiverton, Honiton
- Replaced by: Honiton and Sidmouth, Tiverton and Minehead

Tiverton and Honiton was a constituency in Devon, England. From its creation in 1997 until a 2022 by-election, the seat was represented by members of the Conservative Party. It was then held by Richard Foord of the Liberal Democrats until its abolition.

Following the 2023 Periodic Review of Westminster constituencies, the seat was abolished, with the majority, including the towns of Axminster, Cullompton, Honiton and Seaton, being included in the new constituency of Honiton and Sidmouth, which was first contested at the 2024 general election. The town of Tiverton and surrounding rural areas were transferred to the new cross-county boundary seat of Tiverton and Minehead.

== Constituency profile ==
This was a mostly rural constituency, covering a broad sweep between Exmoor to the north and Lyme Bay to the south, including the towns of Tiverton and Honiton and their surrounding villages (which include extensive farmland, rivers popular with kayakers and part of the Blackdown Hills). Some residents commute to Exeter. Residents' wealth is around average for the UK.

== Boundaries ==
Map of boundaries 2010-2024

1997–2010: The District of Mid Devon except the wards of Taw, Taw Vale, and West Creedy, and the District of East Devon wards of Broadclyst, Clystbeare, Clyst Valley, Exe Valley, Honiton St Michael's, Honiton St Paul's, Otterhead, Ottery St Mary Rural, Ottery St Mary Town, Patteson, and Tale Vale.

2010–2024: The District of Mid Devon wards of Canonsleigh, Castle, Clare and Shuttern, Cranmore, Cullompton North, Cullompton Outer, Cullompton South, Halberton, Lower Culm, Lowman, Upper Culm, and Westexe, and the District of East Devon wards of Axminster Rural, Axminster Town, Beer and Branscombe, Coly Valley, Dunkeswell, Feniton and Buckerell, Honiton St Michael's, Honiton St Paul's, Newbridges, Otterhead, Seaton, Tale Vale, Trinity, and Yarty.

=== Boundary changes for 2010 ===
Parliament accepted the Boundary Commission's Fifth Periodic Review of Westminster constituencies which slightly altered this constituency for the 2010 general election, and gave Devon 12 seats instead of 11. Some wards of Mid Devon District in this seat were transferred to the new Central Devon constituency; however, parts of the East Devon constituency, including the towns of Axminster and Seaton, were gained in return.

== History ==
The seat came about when the town of Honiton from the Honiton constituency was added to the Tiverton constituency in 1997. Both were long-established seats, with the former having existed from 1640 and the latter from 1615. Both elected two Members of Parliament until the 1884 Reform Act reduced the number for both to one and their area was widened to cover two divisions of the county under the Redistribution of Seats Act 1885.

Prominent holders of the seats in the 19th century included Whig politician Joseph Locke, a railway pioneer, who was MP for Honiton, and Lord Palmerston, who, while MP for Tiverton, served as the first Prime Minister from the newly formed Liberal Party (1855–1858 and 1859–1865).

The area served by the constituency had not been represented by a party other than the Conservative Party in Westminster since 1923. Following the 2022 Tiverton and Honiton by-election, the Liberal Democrats gained the seat from the Conservatives. The by-election was held following the resignation of Neil Parish after he was caught watching pornography in the House of Commons chamber (Parish himself admitted to doing so on two separate occasions).

== Members of Parliament ==
Election	Member	Party
1997	Angela Browning	Conservative
2010	Neil Parish	Conservative
2022	Neil Parish	Independent
2022 by-election	Richard Foord	Liberal Democrats

== Elections ==
Results over time by percentage
Results over time by number of votes

=== Elections in the 2020s ===
A by-election for the United Kingdom parliamentary constituency of Tiverton and Honiton was held on 23 June 2022. It was caused by the resignation of incumbent Conservative Party Member of Parliament (MP) Neil Parish following his admission that he viewed pornography on his mobile phone in the House of Commons chamber. The by-election was won by Richard Foord of the Liberal Democrats. The Conservative majority of 24,239 in the 2019 general election is thought to have been the largest majority ever overturned in a by-election.

It was the Liberal Democrats' third gain from the Conservatives since 2019, following their victory at Chesham and Amersham in June 2021, and in North Shropshire in December 2021.

The election was held on the same day as the 2022 Wakefield by-election, which the Conservatives lost to the Labour Party. This was the first time since the 1991 Kincardine and Deeside and Langbaurgh by-elections that a British government has lost two seats in by-elections on the same day.

=== Elections in the 2010s ===
General election 2019: Tiverton and Honiton
Party	Candidate	Votes	%	±%
Conservative	Neil Parish	35,893	60.2	―1.2
Labour	Liz Pole	11,654	19.5	―7.6
Liberal Democrats	John Timperley	8,807	14.8	+6.8
Green	Colin Reed	2,291	3.8	+0.3
UKIP	Margaret Dennis	968	1.6	New
Majority		24,239	40.7	+6.4
Turnout		59,613	71.9	+0.4
Conservative hold		Swing	+3.3	

General election 2017: Tiverton and Honiton
Party	Candidate	Votes	%	±%
Conservative	Neil Parish	35,471	61.4	+7.4
Labour	Caroline Kolek	15,670	27.1	+14.4
Liberal Democrats	Matthew Wilson	4,639	8.0	―2.5
Green	Gill Westcott	2,035	3.5	―2.9
Majority		19,801	34.3	―3.2
Turnout		57,815	71.5	+1.0
Conservative hold		Swing	―3.5	

General election 2015: Tiverton and Honiton
Party	Candidate	Votes	%	±%
Conservative	Neil Parish	29,030	54.0	+3.7
UKIP	Graham Smith	8,857	16.5	+10.5
Labour	Caroline Kolek	6,835	12.7	+3.8
Liberal Democrats	Stephen Kearney	5,626	10.5	―22.8
Green	Paul Edwards	3,415	6.4	+4.9
Majority		20,173	37.5	+20.5
Turnout		53,763	70.5	―1.0
Conservative hold		Swing	―3.4	

General election 2010: Tiverton and Honiton
Party	Candidate	Votes	%	±%
Conservative	Neil Parish	27,614	50.3	+3.6
Liberal Democrats	Jon Underwood	18,294	33.3	+4.2
Labour	Vernon Whitlock	4,907	8.9	―4.4
UKIP	Daryl Stanbury	3,277	6.0	+1.2
Green	Cathy Connor	802	1.5	―1.3
Majority		9,320	17.0	+0.6
Turnout		54,894	71.5	+1.0
Conservative hold		Swing	―0.3	

=== Elections prior to the 2010s ===
General election 2005: Tiverton and Honiton
Party	Candidate	Votes	%	±%
Conservative	Angela Browning	27,838	47.9	+0.8
Liberal Democrats	David Nation	16,787	28.9	―6.9
Labour	Fiona Bentley	7,944	13.7	+1.8
UKIP	Bob Edwards	2,499	4.3	+2.0
Liberal	Roy Collins	1,701	2.9	+1.8
Green	Colin Matthews	1,399	2.4	+0.6
Majority		11,051	19.0	+7.7
Turnout		58,168	69.8	+0.6
Conservative hold		Swing	+3.8	

General election 2001: Tiverton and Honiton
Party	Candidate	Votes	%	±%
Conservative	Angela Browning	26,258	47.1	+5.8
Liberal Democrats	James Barnard	19,974	35.8	―2.7
Labour	Isabel Owen	6,647	11.9	―0.9
UKIP	Alan Langmaid	1,281	2.3	New
Green	Matthew Burgess	1,030	1.8	+1.0
Liberal	Jennifer Roach	594	1.1	0.0
Majority		6,284	11.3	+8.5
Turnout		55,784	69.2	―8.4
Conservative hold		Swing	+4.2	

General election 1997: Tiverton and Honiton
Party	Candidate	Votes	%	±%
Conservative	Angela Browning	24,438	41.3	−9.9
Liberal Democrats	James Barnard	22,785	38.5	+6.8
Labour	John King	7,598	12.8	+1.9
Referendum	Stephen Lowings	2,952	5.0	
Liberal	Jennifer Roach	635	1.1	
Green	Emily McIvor	485	0.8	
National Democrats	Del Charles	236	0.4	
Majority		1,653	2.8	
Turnout		59,129	77.6	
Conservative win (new seat)				

== See also ==
- List of parliamentary constituencies in Devon

== Sources ==
- David Boothroyd. "Constituencies in the unreformed House". Constituency enfranchisement dates.
