= Richard Foord =

British politician (born 1978)

Major Richard Foord MP
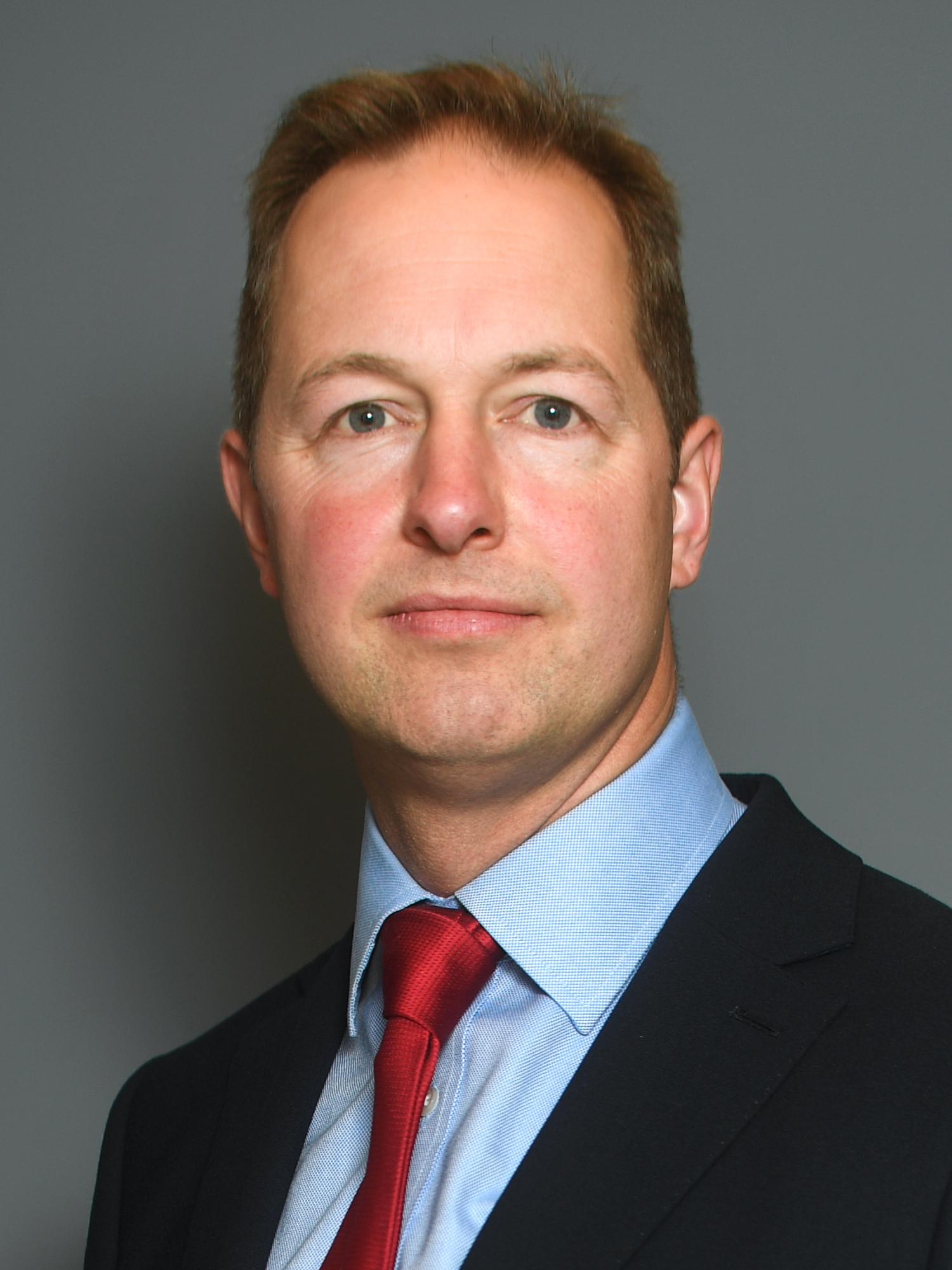
- Official portrait, 2022

Member of Parliament for Honiton and Sidmouth Tiverton and Honiton (2022–2024)
- Incumbent
- Assumed office 23 June 2022
- Preceded by: Neil Parish
- Majority: 6,700 (13.2%)

Liberal Democrat portfolios
- 2022–2024: Defence

Personal details
- Born: Richard John Foord; 13 February 1978 (age 48) Weston-super-Mare, Somerset, England
- Party: Liberal Democrats
- Children: 3
- Education: Royal Military Academy Sandhurst; Royal Holloway, University of London; Cranfield University; Open University
- Website: www.richardfoord.org.uk

Military service
- Allegiance: United Kingdom
- Branch/service: British Army
- Years of service: 2001–2010
- Rank: Major
- Unit: Adjutant General's Corps
- Battles/wars: Iraq War

Richard John Foord (/fɔːrd/; born 13 February 1978) is a British Liberal Democrat politician and former British Army officer who has served as Member of Parliament (MP) for Honiton and Sidmouth, previously Tiverton and Honiton, since 2022.

== Early life and education ==
Richard John Foord was born on 13 February 1978 in Weston-super-Mare, Somerset, and grew up in North Somerset, living in the village of Yatton for nineteen years and going to Backwell School. He has a BA in history from Royal Holloway, University of London, an MSc in global security from Cranfield University and an MBA from the Open University.

== Career ==
After training at the Royal Military Academy Sandhurst, Foord was commissioned into the Educational and Training Services Branch of the Adjutant General's Corps of the British Army on 13 April 2001. He was promoted to captain on 13 October 2003. After attending Staff College, he was promoted to major on 31 July 2009. He served in both the Balkans and Iraq, receiving three campaign medals.

Before his election to Parliament, Foord was International Collaboration and Export Control Manager at the University of Oxford, having previously worked at the University of Exeter from 2010, most recently as acting head of global partnerships.

== Parliamentary career ==
Foord stood as the Liberal Democrat candidate for North Somerset at the snap 2017 general election, coming third with 9.6% of the vote behind the incumbent Conservative MP Liam Fox and the Labour Party candidate.

Following the resignation of Conservative MP Neil Parish from Parliament, Foord was elected as the MP for Tiverton and Honiton at a 2022 by-election with 52.9% of the vote and a majority of 6,144.

In January 2023, Foord tabled his first bill in Parliament to legalise wild camping on Dartmoor. This came in the wake of a High Court ruling which saw the assumed right to wild camp at Dartmoor, established by the Dartmoor Commons Act 1985, overturned and replaced by an agreement between the Park Authority and local landowners.

In July 2023, Foord launched a campaign to keep Seaton hospital open, after it emerged a whole wing of the hospital was at risk of being sold off. He chairs the "Save Seaton Hospital" steering committee, which campaigns against the sale. He has raised this issue several times in Parliament, presenting a petition calling for the government to intervene and block plans to sell part of it off in February 2024, and organising a large public meeting in Colyford to allow the community to express their concerns.

Due to the 2023 review of Westminster constituencies, Foord's constituency of Tiverton and Honiton was abolished, and replaced with Honiton and Sidmouth. At the 2024 general election, Foord was elected to Parliament as MP for Honiton and Sidmouth with 45.4% of the vote and a majority of 6,700. He is an Advisory Board member of the Council on Geostrategy.

== Personal life ==
Foord is married and lives in Uffculme with his wife and three children. He is a member of Sustrans and a qualified mountain leader. He previously ran the London Marathon, raising thousands to support the Royal British Legion.

Parliament of the United Kingdom
Preceded by Neil Parish	Member of Parliament for Tiverton and Honiton; 2022–2024	Constituency abolished
New constituency	Member of Parliament for Honiton and Sidmouth; 2024–present	Incumbent
