= 2022 Tiverton and Honiton by-election =

UK parliamentary by-election

- 23 June 2022

Tiverton and Honiton constituency
- Turnout: 52.3% (▼19.6 pp)
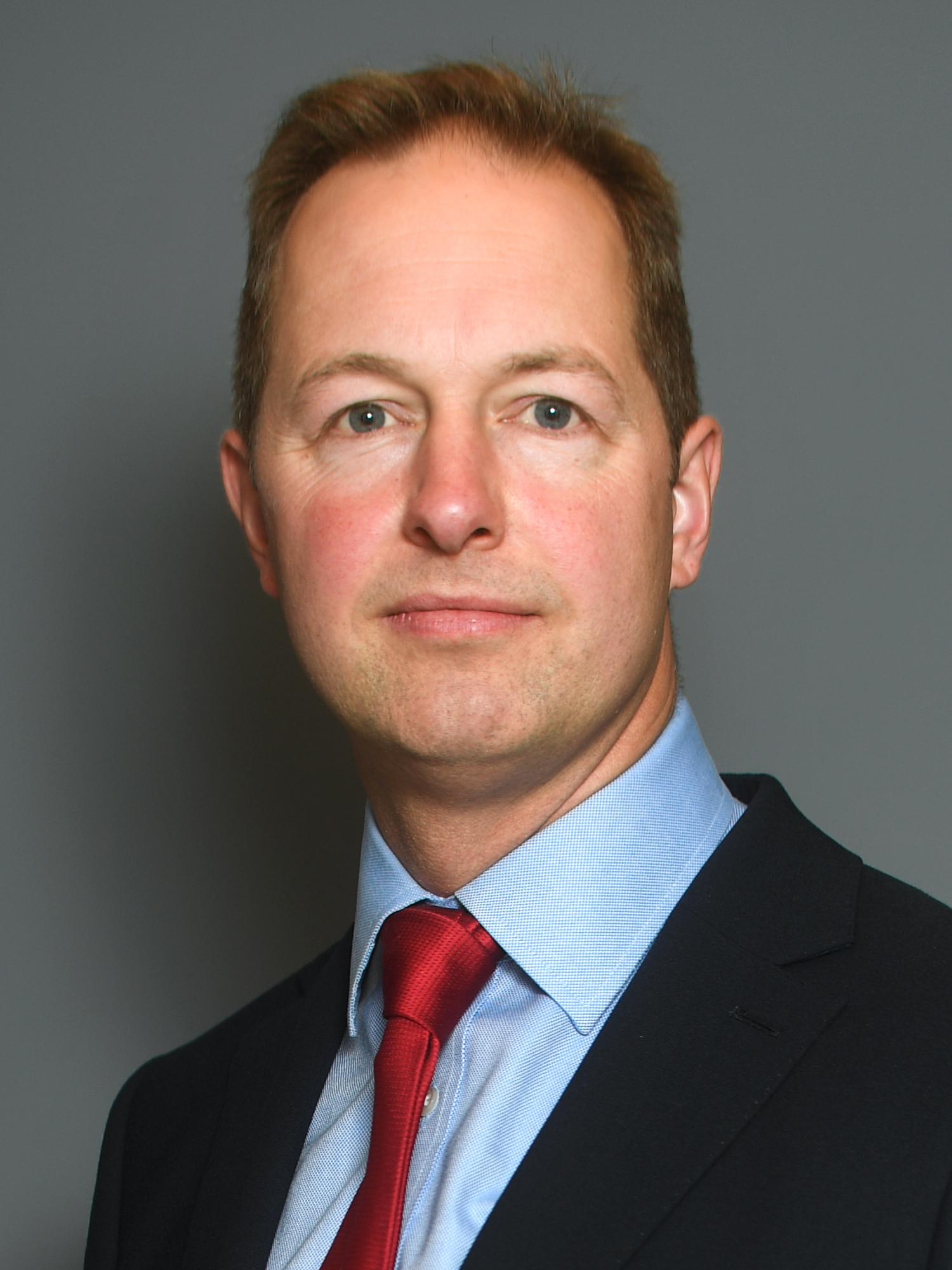
	First party	Second party
		Con
Candidate	Richard Foord	Helen Hurford
Party	Liberal Democrats	Conservative
Popular vote	22,537	16,393
Percentage	52.9%	38.5%
Swing	▲38.0 pp	▼21.7pp
MP before election
Neil Parish
Conservative
Elected MP
Richard Foord
Liberal Democrats

A by-election for the United Kingdom parliamentary constituency of Tiverton and Honiton was held on 23 June 2022. It was caused by the resignation of incumbent Conservative Party Member of Parliament (MP) Neil Parish following his admission that he viewed pornography on his mobile phone in the House of Commons chamber. The by-election was won by Richard Foord of the Liberal Democrats. The Conservative majority of 24,239 in the 2019 general election is thought to have been the largest majority ever overturned in a by-election.

It was the Liberal Democrats' third gain from the Conservatives since 2019, following their victory at Chesham and Amersham in June 2021, and in North Shropshire in December 2021.

The election was held on the same day as the 2022 Wakefield by-election, which the Conservatives lost to the Labour Party. This was the first time since the 1991 Kincardine and Deeside and Langbaurgh by-elections that a British government has lost two seats in by-elections on the same day.

== Background ==
=== Constituency ===
Tiverton and Honiton lies in Devon and the constituency is primarily rural, with major settlements being the towns of Tiverton and Honiton. Other towns include Axminster, Seaton and Cullompton. In the 2016 EU referendum, 57.8% of the voters who turned out voted to leave the European Union.

The by-election was the ninth of the 2019 Parliament. The seat was said by The Guardian to be, on paper at least, one of the safest in the country for the Conservatives, with the party having held the constituency since its creation in 1997 by increasing margins, with its inaugural election in 1997 representing the closest result in the seat, with just 1,653 votes or three percentage points separating the winning Conservative candidate and the Liberal Democrat opponent.

=== Trigger ===
Popular incumbent Parish was first elected as a Conservative MP in the 2010 general election. A female Conservative MP complained on 25 April 2022 to the party's Chief Whip about a male colleague having watched pornography on his mobile phone in the Commons chamber, without identifying the individual. This was later identified to be Parish. He was alleged to have watched pornography on two occasions in the House of Commons. Parish said the first occasion was accidental, as he discovered a pornographic website during a search related to tractors, but admitted that the second occasion had been intentional, and announced his intention to resign as an MP on 30 April 2022.

On 4 May, Parish was appointed to the position of Steward and Bailiff of the Manor of Northstead, disqualifying him from being an MP, which is a mechanism by which an MP's resignation is put into effect.

On 17 May, the writ was moved by the Chief Whip, Chris Heaton-Harris, formally triggering the by-election.

On 19 May, the acting returning officer published the notice of the election confirming the timetable with the poll taking place on Thursday 23 June 2022, the same day as the Wakefield by-election.

== Campaign ==
Labour frontbench sources confirmed that senior Labour figures had told them the party would be "soft-pedalling" the campaign in the by-election in order to allow the Liberal Democrats an easier shot at winning. A Labour spokesperson did not deny this, but confirmed they would be standing a candidate.

The Times reported a focus group for Times Radio had found that voters in the constituency who supported the Tories in the last election were swinging towards the Liberal Democrats as they lost faith in Conservative Prime Minister Boris Johnson.

Cllr Paul Arnott, the leader of East Devon District Council, and of the East Devon Alliance Independents group on the council, announced he had joined the national Liberal Democrats party and supported them in the by-election.

On 15 June, The Guardian reported on internal polling carried out by the Liberal Democrats based on 'tens of thousands of voter contacts', which found that the Conservatives had 46% support and the Lib Dems were marginally behind at 44%. The Lib Dems said they had a 4% deficit at the same time before the North Shropshire by-election, which they won. Further internal polling by the Liberal Democrats, reported on by the i newspaper on 20 June, put the Liberal Democrats and the Conservatives neck-and-neck, with both garnering 45% of the vote. According to Daily Mirror journalist Rachel Wearmouth, internal data – not disclosed until after the polls had closed – showed the Liberal Democrats 5% ahead of the Conservatives over the weekend prior to the by-election.

The poor condition of Tiverton High School was reportedly an important issue in the campaign.

== Candidates ==
Parish said that he might run in the by-election as an independent, stating that he had been pledged financial support. However, he ultimately did not appear on the list of candidates.

On 20 May, the Liberal Democrats announced that their candidate would be university worker Richard Foord, a retired Army major.

The Conservative Party produced an all-female shortlist for the seat, and selected Helen Hurford, the Deputy Mayor of Honiton, as their candidate on 22 May.

The Labour Party selected Liz Pole, a businesswoman and chair of the Constituency Labour Party, on 22 May. Pole previously stood for Labour in the same seat at the 2019 general election, coming second.

Initially, there were some suggestions that Claire Wright, an independent former County Councillor who came second in the neighbouring constituency of East Devon in the last three elections, would stand. However, she clarified on a statement on Twitter that she would not put her name forward, instead endorsing the Liberal Democrats.

== Result ==
Bar chart of the election result.

This result was the sixth-largest swing against the governing party since 1945; in addition, the Conservative Party's 24,239-vote majority from the 2019 general election is the largest ever overturned in a by-election.

2022 Tiverton and Honiton by-election
Party	Candidate	Votes	%	±%
Liberal Democrats	Richard Foord	22,537	52.9	+38.1
Conservative	Helen Hurford	16,393	38.5	−21.7
Labour	Liz Pole	1,562	3.7	−15.8
Green	Gill Westcott	1,064	2.5	−1.3
Reform	Andy Foan	481	1.1	New
UKIP	Ben Walker	241	0.6	−1.0
Heritage	Jordan Donoghue-Morgan	167	0.4	New
For Britain	Frankie Rufolo	146	0.3	New
Majority		6,144	14.4	N/A
Turnout		42,593	52.3	−19.6
Liberal Democrats gain from Conservative		Swing	+29.9	

== Previous result ==
General election 2019: Tiverton and Honiton
Party	Candidate	Votes	%	±%
Conservative	Neil Parish	35,893	60.2	−1.2
Labour	Liz Pole	11,654	19.5	−7.6
Liberal Democrats	John Timperley	8,807	14.8	+6.8
Green	Colin Reed	2,291	3.8	+0.3
UKIP	Margaret Dennis	968	1.6	New
Majority		24,239	40.7	+6.4
Turnout		59,613	71.9	+0.4
Conservative hold		Swing	+3.3	

== Reactions ==
Liberal Democrat leader Sir Ed Davey said that the key factor in Foord's victory was "not just Partygate and the constant lies and law-breaking. It's the general sense of neglect and being taken for granted by [Boris] Johnson's Conservatives."

Political scientist Sir John Curtice partly attributed the large swing to the Liberal Democrats to tactical voting by Labour voters wishing to avoid a Conservative MP. Secretary of State for Education Nadhim Zahawi said that the new schools programme was an important reason in the by-election.

Conservative candidate Helen Hurford was ridiculed in the press for locking herself in a storage room upon her arrival at the counting venue, and refusing to speak to journalists.

== See also ==
- Largest swings in United Kingdom by-elections
