= Honiton and Sidmouth =

UK Parliament constituency (since 2024)

- County constituency for the House of Commons
- Interactive map of boundaries from 2024
- Location within South West England
- County: Devon
- Electorate: 74,365 (2023)
- Major settlements: Axminster, Honiton, Seaton, Ottery St Mary, Sidmouth, Cullompton

Current constituency
- Created: 2024
- Member of Parliament: Richard Foord (Liberal Democrats)
- Seats: One
- Created from: Tiverton and Honiton & East Devon

Honiton and Sidmouth is a constituency of the House of Commons in the UK Parliament. It was first contested at the 2024 general election. The current MP is Richard Foord, a Liberal Democrat who was first elected for the now abolished seat of Tiverton and Honiton at a by-election in 2022. He defeated Simon Jupp, who had been the Conservative MP for the now-abolished seat East Devon from 2019 to 2024.

The constituency name refers to the Devon towns of Honiton and Sidmouth. It is considered by BBC News to be a battleground between the Conservatives and Liberal Democrats.

== Constituency profile ==
Honiton and Sidmouth is a rural constituency located in Devon. It is named after its two largest towns, the inland Honiton and the coastal Sidmouth, which each have populations of around 13,000. The other towns in the constituency are Seaton, Colyton, Axminster, Ottery St Mary and Cullompton. Sidmouth and Seaton are popular with tourists and lie along the Jurassic Coast, a UNESCO World Heritage Site. The constituency has average levels of wealth, with the coastal areas generally being more affluent than the inland parts. House prices across the constituency are above the national average.

On average, residents of the constituency are considerably older than the rest of the country. Levels of education and income are similar to national averages, and a high proportion of residents work in agriculture, retail and tourism. White people made up 97% of the population at the 2021 census. At the local council level, the constituency's political representation is a mixture of Liberal Democrats, Conservatives and independents, with the Liberal Democrats being more popular in the inland areas. An estimated 55% of voters in the constituency supported leaving the European Union in the 2016 referendum, marginally higher than the nationwide figure of 52%.

== Boundaries ==
The constituency was established by the 2023 review of Westminster constituencies and is composed of the following electoral wards:

- The District of East Devon wards of Axminster, Beer & Branscombe, Coly Valley, Dunkeswell & Otterhead, Feniton, Honiton St Michael's, Honiton St Paul's, Newbridges, Newton Poppleford & Harpford, Ottery St Mary, Seaton, Sidmouth Rural, Sidmouth Sidford, Sidmouth Town, Tale Vale, Trinity, West Hill & Aylesbeare, and Yarty.
- The District of Mid Devon wards of Cullompton Padbrook, Cullompton St Andrews, Cullompton Vale, Lower Culm (part); and very small parts of Bradninch and Halberton wards.

It comprises the following areas:

- The towns of Axminster, Honiton and Seaton and the surrounding rural areas of East Devon District, transferred from the abolished constituency of Tiverton and Honiton
- The towns of Ottery St Mary and Sidmouth in East Devon District transferred from the abolished constituency of East Devon
- The town of Cullompton in Mid Devon District, also transferred from Tiverton and Honiton

== Members of Parliament ==
=== 2024–present ===
Election	Member	Party	Notes
2024	Richard Foord	Liberal Democrats	Previously MP for Tiverton and Honiton from 2022.

== Election results ==
=== Elections in the 2020s ===
General election 2024: Honiton and Sidmouth
Party	Candidate	Votes	%	±%
Liberal Democrats	Richard Foord	23,007	45.4	+35.8
Conservative	Simon Jupp	16,307	32.2	−28.2
Reform UK	Paul Quickenden	6,289	12.4	N/A
Labour	Jake Bonetta	2,947	5.8	−8.4
Green	Henry Gent	1,394	2.8	+0.7
Independent	Vanessa Coxon	467	0.9	N/A
Party of Women	Hazel Exon	244	0.5	N/A
Majority		6,700	13.2	N/A
Turnout		50,655	67.1	–9.3
Registered electors		75,537		
Liberal Democrats gain from Conservative		Swing	+32.1	

=== Elections in the 2010s ===
2019 notional result
Party	Vote	%
Conservative	34,307	60.4
Labour	8,078	14.2
Independent	6,850	12.1
Liberal Democrats	5,432	9.6
Green	1,174	2.1
UKIP	968	1.7
Turnout	56,809	76.4
Electorate	74,365	
