= 2017 Copeland by-election =

- 23 February 2017

Copeland constituency
- Turnout: 51.3%
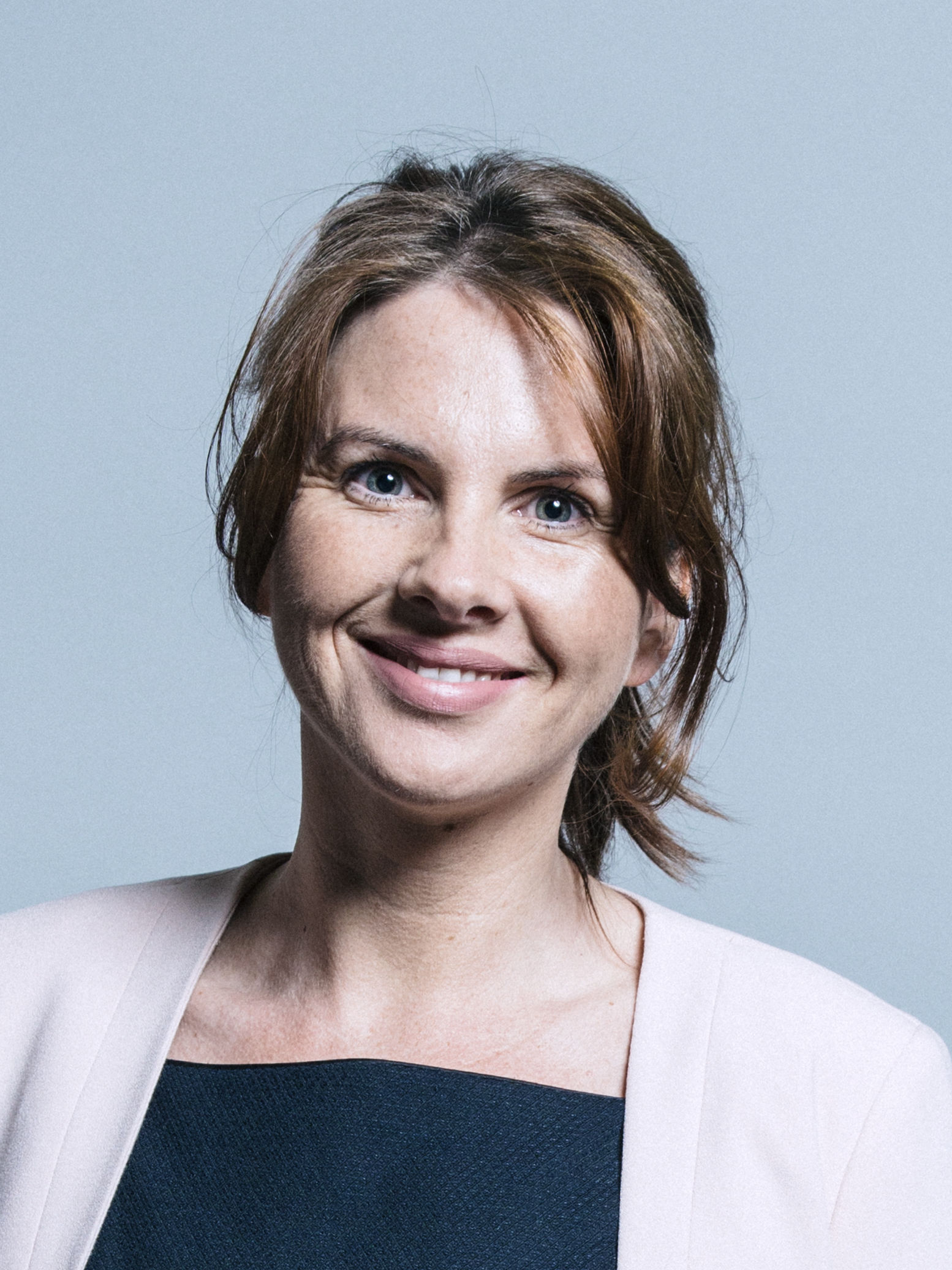
	First party	Second party
		Lab
Candidate	Trudy Harrison	Gillian Troughton
Party	Conservative	Labour
Popular vote	13,748	11,601
Percentage	44.2%	37.3%
Swing	▲8.5 pp	▼4.9 pp
	Third party	Fourth party
	Lib	UKIP
Candidate	Rebecca Hanson	Fiona Mills
Party	Liberal Democrats	UKIP
Popular vote	2,252	2,025
Percentage	7.2%	6.5%
Swing	▲3.8 pp	▼9.0 pp
MP before election
Jamie Reed
Labour
Elected MP
Trudy Harrison
Conservative

A by-election for the United Kingdom parliamentary constituency of Copeland was held on 23 February 2017. It was triggered by the resignation of Labour Party Member of Parliament (MP) Jamie Reed to take up a new role at a nuclear decommissioning firm. The by-election was won by Conservative Party candidate Trudy Harrison who gained the seat from Labour; it marked the first gain for a governing party in a by-election since 1982.

== Background ==
The incumbent Labour MP Jamie Reed announced his intention to resign on 21 December 2016 in order to become the new Head of Development & Community Relations at Sellafield Ltd, where he had worked before becoming a politician. He was a critic of the Labour Party leader Jeremy Corbyn, a reportedly unpopular politician in the constituency. Reed's resignation took effect on 23 January 2017.

The election was held with the Conservatives considerably ahead of Labour in national opinion polls.

Copeland and Whitehaven, the predecessor seat, had been represented by Labour since 1935. Although Reed supported remaining within the European Union, his constituency voted to leave in the June 2016 EU referendum. Because the constituency is not coterminous with any local authority, the exact result is unknown. Chris Hanretty, a Reader in Politics at the University of East Anglia, estimated through a demographic model that in Copeland, 60% of voters voted 'Leave'.

== Candidates ==
=== Labour ===
Gillian Troughton, a Borough and County Councillor, was selected as the Labour Party candidate on 19 January. During the EU referendum, Troughton had been an active Remain campaigner. The short list to be Labour's candidate, announced on 12 January, had included Barbara Cannon, a former Borough and County Councillor, Rachel Holliday, founder of Calderwood House hostel, and Troughton. Long-listed candidates had included Thomas Docherty, who was the MP for Dunfermline and West Fife from 2010–5 and had previously applied to be the Copeland candidate, before losing to Reed. Andrew Gwynne, shadow cabinet minister without portfolio, was Labour's campaign manager.

=== Conservatives ===
On 25 January, Trudy Harrison was selected as the party's candidate. Harrison lives locally in the village of Bootle and has worked at Sellafield. The Conservatives highlighted lower unemployment locally and improved standards in local schools. Possible Conservative candidate choices had included Stephen Haraldsen, their candidate in 2015, and Chris Whiteside, a former parliamentary candidate and their candidate in the 2015 Copeland mayoral election.

=== UK Independence Party ===
The UK Independence Party's (UKIP) West Cumbria branch selected Fiona Mills as their candidate, a local National Health Service (NHS) worker, member of UKIP's National Executive Committee and county chairwoman, who had stood as the party's candidate in Carlisle in the 2015 general election. UKIP leader Paul Nuttall ruled himself out of standing in this by-election, initially to focus on a potential by-election in Leigh, then to contest the Stoke-on-Trent Central by-election.

=== Liberal Democrats ===
The Liberal Democrat candidate was confirmed on 12 January 2017 as Cockermouth Town Councillor, Rebecca Hanson. She highlighted Brexit and the NHS.

=== Green Party ===
On 24 January 2017, the Green Party announced Jack Lenox, a local software engineer, as their candidate for the by-election. Given the party's opposition to nuclear power and the importance of the nuclear industry in the constituency, their campaign attracted more publicity than normal. They also said that their candidate would be contesting an "anti-nuclear and anti-poverty campaign".

=== Independents ===
Two independent candidates also stood. Copeland borough and Whitehaven town councillor Michael Guest announced his candidacy on 31 January, saying he was aiming to represent people "dissatisfied with party politics". Whitehaven market stallholder Roy Ivinson, who also submitted nomination papers, had previously stood for seats in the area on a platform of stopping global warming.

== Campaign ==
An early issue in the campaign was plans to downgrade maternity services at West Cumberland Hospital in Whitehaven. The plans were defended by the Conservative Prime Minister, Theresa May. In response to Labour criticism, the Conservative campaign said that decisions about local hospitals were the responsibility of the local NHS trust.

Trade unions claimed that government cuts to Sellafield's employee pension scheme could "threaten the Conservatives' chances of winning the by-election".

The Conservatives focused on Labour leader Jeremy Corbyn and his long-standing opposition to nuclear energy and nuclear weapons. The constituency contains the Sellafield nuclear decommissioning plant and nuclear submarines are built in nearby Barrow, and Conservative election literature highlighted the potential risks to the Cumbrian economy of Labour policies. Labour campaigners responded that the views of party leader Corbyn do not represent the views of the party. The Conservatives also campaigned on a pro-Brexit line, suggesting that voting Conservative would ensure that Brexit is delivered, whereas voting Labour would encourage Labour to "ignore and forget ... the EU referendum".

It was reported that the Labour candidate had refused requests for interviews from Channel 4, whilst all other major candidates had accepted the request.

A storm, named Doris, hit the constituency on polling day, which some commentators suggested might reduce turnout, though in the event the turnout was relatively high for a Westminster by-election.

== Result ==
By-election 2017: Copeland
Party	Candidate	Votes	%	±%
Conservative	Trudy Harrison	13,748	44.2	▲8.5
Labour	Gillian Troughton	11,601	37.3	▼4.9
Liberal Democrats	Rebecca Hanson	2,252	7.2	▲3.8
UKIP	Fiona Mills	2,025	6.5	▼9.0
Independent	Michael Guest	811	2.6	N/A
Green	Jack Lenox	515	1.7	▼1.3
Independent	Roy Ivinson	116	0.4	N/A
Majority		2,147	6.9	N/A
Turnout		31,108	51.3	▼12.5
Conservative gain from Labour		Swing	▲6.7	

This was the first time since 1935 that Labour had failed to win the constituency or its predecessor, Whitehaven. It was also the first gain for a governing party at a UK by-election since the 1982 Mitcham and Morden by-election, where the incumbent Labour MP had sought re-election after defecting to the Social Democratic Party against the background of the Falklands War. It was the largest increase in the share of the vote of a governing party in a by-election since the Kingston upon Hull North by-election in January 1966. According to Matt Singh of psephology website Number Cruncher Politics, it was the first directly comparable by-election gain for a governing party since the 1878 by-election in Worcester. By this, Singh meant that the governing party gained a seat:

- without the incumbent having defected from their party (as at the 1982 Mitcham and Morden by-election and the 1929 Preston by-election);
- without the winning candidate being disqualified (as at the 1961 Bristol South East by-election);
- where the incumbent's party had a prior majority of more than 3% (unlike at the 1960 Brighouse and Spenborough by-election, the 1953 Sunderland South by-election, and the 1924 Liverpool West Toxteth by-election);
- where the incumbent had been a member of the principal opposition party (unlike at the 1929 Liverpool Scotland by-election, the 1926 Combined English Universities by-election, the 1922 Hackney South by-election, the 1921 Woolwich East by-election, and the 1912 Hanley by-election); and
- without there being a significant change in the lineup of parties contesting the seat (as at the 1901 North East Lanarkshire by-election).

The poor result for Labour triggered fresh criticism of Jeremy Corbyn's leadership of the party, with calls for him to stand down as leader.

=== 2015 result ===
General election 2015: Copeland
Party	Candidate	Votes	%	±%
Labour	Jamie Reed	16,750	42.3	▼3.7
Conservative	Stephen Haraldsen	14,186	35.8	▼1.3
UKIP	Michael Pye	6,148	15.5	▲13.2
Liberal Democrats	Danny Gallagher	1,368	3.5	▼6.7
Green	Allan Todd	1,179	3.0	▲2.1
Majority		2,564	6.5	▼2.4
Turnout		39,631	63.8	▼3.8
Labour hold		Swing	▼1.2	

== See also ==
- List of United Kingdom by-elections (2010–present)
