= Wyndham School, Egremont =

Former school in Cumbria, England

Wyndham School, Egremont was a secondary school in Cumbria. Trudy Harrison, the Member of Parliament (MP) for Copeland from 2017 to 2024 is a former pupil.

Wyndham School Houses

In the beginning Wyndham Secondary Modern had 4 houses - Scott, Grenfell, Mallory and Livingstone (named after explorers)

When Wyndham became a comprehensive in 1964 there were 8 houses (named after the original head of houses) in 4 blocks plus a separate 6th Form block:-

Udy, Sanderson, Birch, Wright, Tindall. Johnson, Clark and Hughes. A Reception block for 1st years was added in 1968. Around the same time the 6th form also occupied the top floor of the science block.

In 1978 8 became 4 named after local pits:

Udy/Wright - Croft; Birch/Sanderson - Ehen; Tindall/Johnson - Peel; Clark/Hughes - Falcon.

Reception was still a block on its own housing 1st years and a separate 6th Form block.

Reception was then closed (1985?) and 1st years went straight into their respective houses. 6th Form still a separate block.

Reception became Lonsdale in 1994.

Croft ceased to be.

6th Form moved to top of science block

Reception/Lonsdale also housed 6th form.

The school merged with Ehenside School in 2008 and was called West Lakes Academy. The buildings were knocked down and rebuilt on the same site in 2012.
