= Opinion polling for the United Kingdom European Union membership referendum =

Surveying for 2016 referendum

Opinion polling on the referendum from 2013 to the date the referendum was held, showing "remain" in green, "leave" in red, and "undecided" in blue (as of 23 June 2016)

The referendum on EU membership took place on 23 June 2016. Opinion polling for the United Kingdom European Union membership referendum was ongoing in the months between the announcement of a referendum and the referendum polling day. Polls on the general principle of the UK's membership of the European Union were carried out for a number of years prior to the referendum. Opinion polls of voters in general tended to show roughly equal proportions in favour of remaining and leaving. Polls of business leaders, scientists, and lawyers showed majorities in favour of remaining. Among non-British citizens in other EU member states, polling suggested that a majority were in favour of the UK remaining in the EU in principle, but that a similarly sized majority believed that if the UK were only able to remain in the EU on renegotiated terms then it should leave.

== Analysis ==
=== Demographics ===
Younger voters tended to support remaining in the EU (but are generally less likely to vote) whereas older people tended to support leaving. There was no significant difference in attitudes between the genders. According to two out of three pollsters, managerial, professional, and administrative workers were most likely to favour staying in the EU, while semi-skilled and unskilled workers, plus those reliant on benefits, were the largest demographic supporting leave. University graduates are generally more likely to vote remain compared to those with no qualifications. White voters were evenly split, and all ethnic minority groups leant towards backing Remain, but registration is lower and turnout can be up to 25% lower in this demographic. Support for remaining in the EU was known to be significantly higher in Scotland than it is in the United Kingdom as a whole.

=== Polling methods ===
The way voters are polled is known to affect the outcome. Telephone polls have consistently found more support for remaining in the EU than online polls. YouGov, which uses online polling, has criticised telephone polls because they "have too high a percentage of graduates", skewing the results. Ipsos MORI and ComRes, and Peter Kellner, the former president of YouGov, have said telephone polls are more reliable. ICM has said "as good a guess as any is that the right answer lies somewhere in between". A joint study by Populus and Number Cruncher Politics in March 2016 concluded that telephone polls were likely to better reflect the state of public opinion on the issue.

The results of the Referendum, as with the results of the 2015 General Election, show that there is still a problem with the polling methodology. Overall, however, online polls seem to have had a better performance than phone polls. Online surveys, on average, predicted a "leave" win with a 1.2% margin, whereas those with a phone methodology had "remain" win with a 2.6% margin. All in all, 63% of online polls predicted a Leave victory, while 78% of phone polls predicted that Remain would win. Kantar TNS and Opinium, both pollsters with online methodologies, were the two groups that forecast a Leave victory just ahead of the vote.

=== Polls of polls ===
Several different groups have calculated polls of polls, which collect and average the results of opinion polls across different companies. They have different methodologies; for example, some give more weight to recent polls than others, some deal with undecided voters differently, and some attempt to adjust for the consistent gap between telephone and online polling. As a result, the polls of polls give a spread of results.

Conducted by	Date	Remain	Leave	Undecided	Lead	Notes
What UK Thinks: EU	23 June	52%	48%	N/A	4%	Six most recent polls.
Elections Etc.	23 June	50.6%	49.4%	N/A	1.2%	Twelve most recent polls. Telephone polls are adjusted in favour of Leave and online polls in favour of Remain.
HuffPost Pollster	23 June	45.8%	45.3%	9%	0.5%	
Number Cruncher Politics	22 June	46%	44%	10%	2%	Equal weighting to phone and online polls.
Financial Times	13 June	48%	46%	6%	2%	Five most recent polls.
The Telegraph	21 June	51%	49%	N/A	2%	Six most recent polls.
The Economist	6 June	44%	44%	9%	0%	Excludes polls with fewer than 900 participants.

== Standard polling on EU membership ==
The tables show polling on whether the UK should be in or out of the EU. Polling generally weights the sample to be nationally representative. Polls were usually conducted within Great Britain, with Northern Ireland and Gibraltar normally omitted from the sample. This has historically been the case in British opinion polling because Northern Ireland has a different set of political parties from the rest of the UK, reflecting the political divide between unionism and nationalism or republicanism. Similarly, Gibraltar was not included in standard polls because it has its own local legislature and does not take part in British parliamentary elections, although Gibraltar does take part in elections to the European Parliament and took part in the referendum.

Most of the polls shown here were carried out by members of the British Polling Council (BPC) who fully disclose their findings, methodology and the client who commissioned the poll. As non-members, Qriously (Qriously has since become a member), Greenberg Quinlan Rosner Research, Pew Research Center and Lord Ashcroft Polls are not bound by the standards of the BPC, and their polls should be treated with caution.

The percentages who "would not vote" or who refused to answer are not shown below, although some pollsters have excluded these in any case.

=== 2016 ===
Date(s) conducted	Remain	Leave	Undecided	Lead	Sample	Conducted by	Polling type	Notes
23 June 2016	48.1%	51.9%	N/A	3.8%	33,551,983	The Electoral Commission	UK-wide referendum	Referendum on membership of the European Union also known as the Brexit referendum official polling figures
23 June	52%	48%	N/A	4%	4,772	YouGov	Online	On the day opinion poll
22 June	55%	45%	N/A	10%	4,700	Populus	Online	
20–22 June	51%	49%	N/A	2%	3,766	YouGov	Online	Includes Northern Ireland (turnout weighted)
20–22 June	49%	46%	1%	3%	1,592	Ipsos MORI	Telephone	
20–22 June	44%	45%	9%	1%	3,011	Opinium	Online	
17–22 June	54%	46%	N/A	8%	1,032	ComRes	Telephone	Those expressing a voting intention (turnout weighted)
17–22 June	48%	42%	11%	6%	1,032	ComRes	Telephone	All UK adults (turnout weighted)
16–22 June	41%	43%	16%	2%	2,320	TNS	Online	
20 June	45%	44%	11%	1%	1,003	Survation/IG Group	Telephone	
18–19 June	42%	44%	13%	2%	1,652	YouGov	Online	
16–19 June	53%	46%	2%	7%	800	ORB/Telegraph	Telephone	Definite voters only
17–18 June	45%	42%	13%	3%	1,004	Survation	Telephone	
16–17 June	44%	43%	9%	1%	1,694	YouGov	Online	
14–17 June	44%	44%	12%	N/A	2,006	Opinium	Online	Most fieldwork conducted before the murder of Jo Cox.
16 June	All official campaigning suspended until 19 June after the fatal shooting of Jo Cox MP.							
15–16 June	42%	44%	9%	2%	1,734	YouGov	Online	
15 June	42%	45%	13%	3%	1,104	Survation	Telephone	
10–15 June	37%	47%	16%	10%	1,468	BMG Research	Online	
10–15 June	46%	43%	11%	3%	1,064	BMG Research	Telephone	
11–14 June	43%	49%	3%	6%	1,257	Ipsos MORI	Telephone	
12–13 June	39%	46%	15%	7%	1,905	YouGov	Online	
10–13 June	45%	50%	5%	5%	1,000	ICM	Telephone	Final ICM polls. Only include those "definite" to vote. Paired telephone/online polls by otherwise identical methodology
10–13 June	44%	49%	7%	5%	2,001	ICM	Online	Final ICM polls. Only include those "definite" to vote. Paired telephone/online polls by otherwise identical methodology
9–13 June	46%	45%	9%	1%	1,002	ComRes	Telephone	
7–13 June	40%	47%	13%	7%	2,497	TNS	Online	
9–12 June	48%	49%	3%	1%	800	ORB	Telephone	Measures only those "definite" to vote
16 May–12 June	53%	47%	N/A	6%	N/A	NATCEN	Online/Telephone	Primarily online, those who failed to respond were followed up by phone
9–10 June	42%	43%	11%	1%	1,671	YouGov	Online	
7–10 June	44%	42%	13%	2%	2,009	Opinium	Online	
8–9 June	45%	55%	N/A	10%	2,052	ORB	Online	Weighted according to "definite" voters
5–6 June	43%	42%	11%	1%	2,001	YouGov	Online	Remainder "won't vote"
3–5 June	43%	48%	9%	5%	2,047	ICM	Online	
2–5 June	48%	47%	5%	1%	800	ORB	Telephone	Weighted according to "definite" to vote
1–3 June	41%	45%	11%	4%	3,405	YouGov	Online	
31 May–3 June	43%	41%	16%	2%	2,007	Opinium	Online	Weighted by new methodology
31 May–3 June	40%	43%	16%	3%	2,007	Opinium	Online	Weighted by previous methodology
30–31 May	41%	41%	13%	N/A	1,735	YouGov	Online	
27–29 May	42%	45%	15%	3%	1,004	ICM	Telephone	Paired telephone/online polls by otherwise identical methodology
27–29 May	44%	47%	9%	3%	2,052	ICM	Online	Paired telephone/online polls by otherwise identical methodology
25–29 May	51%	46%	3%	5%	800	ORB	Telephone	
20–25 May	44%	45%	12%	1%	1,638	BMG Research	Online	
24 May	44%	38%	18%	6%	1,013	Survation	Telephone	
23–24 May	41%	41%	13%	N/A	1,756	YouGov	Online	
19–23 May	41%	43%	16%	2%	1,213	TNS	Online	
20–22 May	45%	45%	10%	N/A	2,003	ICM	Online	
18–22 May	55%	42%	3%	13%	800	ORB	Telephone	Poll was said to reflect the private polling conducted for the government
17–19 May	44%	40%	14%	4%	2,008	Opinium	Online	
16–17 May	44%	40%	12%	4%	1,648	YouGov	Online	
14–17 May	52%	41%	7%	11%	1,000	ComRes	Telephone	
14–16 May	55%	37%	5%	18%	1,002	Ipsos MORI	Telephone	
13–15 May	47%	39%	14%	8%	1,002	ICM	Telephone	Paired telephone/online polls by otherwise identical methodology
13–15 May	43%	47%	10%	4%	2,048	ICM	Online	Paired telephone/online polls by otherwise identical methodology
11–15 May	55%	40%	5%	15%	800	ORB	Telephone	
10–12 May	38%	41%	21%	3%	1,222	TNS	Online	
29 Apr–12 May	36%	39%	22%	3%	996	YouGov	Telephone	
29 Apr–12 May	38%	40%	16%	2%	1,973	YouGov	Online	
6–8 May	44%	46%	11%	2%	2,005	ICM	Online	
4–6 May	42%	40%	13%	2%	3,378	YouGov	Online	Remainder "won't vote"
29 Apr–3 May	44%	45%	11%	1%	2,040	ICM	Online	
27–29 Apr	43%	46%	11%	3%	2,029	ICM	Online	
26–29 Apr	42%	41%	14%	1%	2,005	Opinium	Online	24% of respondents preferred not to say; the stated percentages are of the other 76%
27–29 Apr	49%	51%	N/A	2%	2,000	ORB	Online	
26–28 Apr	39%	36%	26%	3%	1,221	TNS	Online	
25–26 Apr	41%	42%	13%	1%	1,650	YouGov	Online	Remainder "won't vote"
25–26 Apr	45%	38%	17%	7%	1,003	Survation	Telephone	
22–26 Apr	43%	45%	13%	2%	2,001	BMG Research	Online	
22–24 Apr	44%	46%	10%	2%	2,001	ICM	Online	
20–24 Apr	51%	43%	6%	8%	800	ORB	Telephone	
16–19 Apr	51%	40%	9%	9%	1,002	ComRes	Telephone	
16–18 Apr	49%	39%	8%	10%	1,026	Ipsos MORI	Telephone	
15–17 Apr	48%	41%	11%	7%	1,003	ICM	Telephone	Paired telephone/online polls by otherwise identical methodology
15–17 Apr	43%	44%	13%	1%	2,008	ICM	Online	Paired telephone/online polls by otherwise identical methodology
13–17 Apr	53%	41%	6%	12%	800	ORB	Telephone	
15 April	The EU referendum campaign officially begins.							
12–14 Apr	38%	34%	28%	4%	1,198	TNS	Online	
12–14 Apr	40%	39%	16%	1%	3,371	YouGov	Online	Remainder "won't vote"
11–12 Apr	39%	39%	17%	N/A	1,693	YouGov	Online	Remainder "won't vote"
7–11 Apr	35%	35%	30%	N/A	1,198	TNS	Online	
8–10 Apr	45%	38%	17%	7%	1,002	ComRes	Telephone	
8–10 Apr	42%	45%	12%	3%	2,030	ICM	Online	
7 April	HM Government starts sending a pro-Remain pamphlet to 27 million UK households and begins a pro-Remain digital advertising campaign.							
6–7 Apr	40%	38%	16%	2%	1,612	YouGov	Online	Remainder "won't vote"
29 Mar–4 Apr	39%	38%	18%	1%	3,754	YouGov	Online	Remainder "won't vote"
1–3 Apr	44%	43%	13%	1%	2,007	ICM	Online	
29 Mar–3 Apr	51%	44%	5%	7%	800	ORB	Telephone	
29 Mar–1 Apr	39%	43%	18%	4%	1,966	Opinium	Online	
24–29 Mar	35%	35%	30%	N/A	1,193	TNS	Online	
24–29 Mar	41%	45%	14%	4%	1,518	BMG Research	Online	Includes Northern Ireland
24–28 Mar	51%	49%	N/A	2%	2,002	ORB	Online	
22–24 Mar	45%	43%	12%	2%	1,970	ICM	Online	Original poll is no longer available on ICM Unlimited
19–22 Mar	49%	41%	10%	8%	1,023	Ipsos MORI	Telephone	
17–22 Mar	40%	37%	19%	3%	1,688	YouGov	Online	Remainder "won't vote"
18–20 Mar	48%	41%	11%	7%	1,002	ComRes	Telephone	
18–20 Mar	41%	43%	17%	2%	2,000	ICM	Online	
17–19 Mar	46%	35%	19%	11%	1,006	Survation	Telephone	Includes Northern Ireland
11–14 Mar	47%	49%	4%	2%	823	ORB	Telephone	
11–13 Mar	43%	41%	16%	2%	2,031	ICM	Online	
4–11 Mar	45%	40%	16%	5%	2,282	Greenberg Quinlan Rosner Research	Online	
2–10 Mar	48%	45%	7%	3%	4,047	Populus/Number Cruncher Politics	Online	
4–6 Mar	49%	35%	15%	14%	966	Populus/Number Cruncher Politics	Telephone	
4–6 Mar	40%	41%	19%	1%	2,051	ICM	Online	
2–3 Mar	40%	37%	18%	3%	1,695	YouGov	Online	
1–2 Mar	40%	35%	19%	5%	1,705	YouGov	Online	
29 Feb–1 Mar	39%	37%	19%	2%	2,233	YouGov	Online	
26–29 Feb	41%	41%	18%	N/A	2,003	ICM	Online	
26–28 Feb	39%	45%	18%	6%	2,071	Populus/Number Cruncher Politics	Online	
26–28 Feb	48%	37%	15%	11%	1,002	Populus/Number Cruncher Politics	Telephone	
24–25 Feb	48%	52%	N/A	4%	2,014	ORB	Online	
21–23 Feb	37%	38%	25%	1%	3,482	YouGov	Online	
20 Feb	David Cameron announces the date of UK's In/out EU referendum after an EU summit in Brussels.							
17–23 Feb	38%	36%	25%	2%	1,517	BMG Research	Online	Includes Northern Ireland
19–22 Feb	42%	40%	17%	2%	2,021	ICM	Online	
19–22 Feb	51%	39%	10%	12%	1,000	ComRes	Telephone	
13–20 Feb	45%	32%	23%	13%	938	Survation	Telephone	
18–19 Feb	40%	41%	19%	1%	1,033	Opinium	Online	Conducted before the conclusion of the negotiations; exact time frame was not communicated
13–16 Feb	54%	36%	10%	18%	497	Ipsos MORI	Telephone	
11–15 Feb	36%	39%	25%	3%	1,079	TNS	Online	
12–14 Feb	43%	39%	18%	4%	2,001	ICM	Online	Original poll is no longer available on ICM Unlimited
11–14 Feb	49%	41%	10%	8%	1,105	ComRes	Telephone	
5–7 Feb	41%	42%	17%	1%	2,018	ICM	Online	
3–4 Feb	36%	45%	19%	9%	1,675	YouGov/The Times	Online	
29–31 Jan	42%	39%	19%	3%	2,002	ICM	Online	
27–28 Jan	38%	42%	20%	4%	1,735	YouGov	Online	
23–25 Jan	55%	36%	9%	19%	513	Ipsos MORI	Telephone	
21–25 Jan	44%	42%	14%	2%	1,511	BMG Research	Online	Includes Northern Ireland
22–24 Jan	54%	36%	10%	18%	1,006	ComRes	Telephone	
22–24 Jan	41%	41%	18%	N/A	2,010	ICM	Online	
20–21 Jan	52%	48%	N/A	4%	2,015	ORB	Online	
15–17 Jan	42%	40%	17%	2%	2,023	ICM	Online	
15–16 Jan	38%	40%	22%	2%	1,017	Survation	Online	Includes Northern Ireland
8–14 Jan	42%	45%	12%	3%	2,087	Panelbase	Online	
8–10 Jan	44%	38%	18%	6%	2,055	ICM	Online	

=== 2015 ===
Date(s) conducted	Remain	Leave	Undecided	Sample	Conducted by	Notes
17–18 Dec	41%	42%	17%	1,598	YouGov	
12–14 Dec	58%	32%	10%	529	Ipsos MORI	
11–13 Dec	56%	35%	8%	1,001	ComRes	
11–13 Dec	42%	41%	17%	2,053	ICM	
4–6 Dec	43%	39%	17%	2,022	ICM	
2–3 Dec	36%	43%	21%	1,001	ORB	
30 Nov–3 Dec	40%	42%	18%	10,015	Survation	Includes Northern Ireland
20–24 Nov	41%	41%	18%	4,317	YouGov	
19–24 Nov	40%	38%	22%	1,699	YouGov	
20–22 Nov	45%	38%	17%	2,002	ICM	
17–19 Nov	48%	52%	N/A	2,067	ORB	
16–17 Nov	43%	40%	18%	1,546	Survation	Includes Northern Ireland
11–17 Nov	39%	39%	22%	1,528	BMG Research	Includes Northern Ireland
13–15 Nov	43%	38%	19%	2,000	ICM	
9–11 Nov	38%	41%	21%	2,007	Survation	Includes Northern Ireland
6–8 Nov	46%	38%	16%	2,024	ICM	
30 Oct–1 Nov	44%	38%	18%	2,060	ICM	
28–29 Oct	39%	41%	19%	1,664	YouGov	
22–27 Oct	40%	40%	20%	1,738	YouGov	
23–25 Oct	45%	38%	17%	2,049	ICM	
23–25 Oct	53%	47%	N/A	2,015	ORB	
22–23 Oct	42%	39%	16%	1,625	YouGov	
19–20 Oct	42%	40%	17%	1,690	YouGov	
17–19 Oct	52%	36%	12%	498	Ipsos MORI	
14–19 Oct	42%	39%	19%	2,372	GQRR	
16–18 Oct	44%	38%	18%	2,023	ICM	
7 Oct	44%	39%	17%	1,947	ICM	
25–28 Sep	55%	36%	8%	1,009	ComRes	
25–27 Sep	45%	38%	17%	2,005	ICM	
17–22 Sep	38%	41%	21%	2,781	YouGov	
10–17 Sep	38%	40%	22%	11,171	YouGov	
11–13 Sep	43%	40%	17%	2,006	ICM	
12 Sep	Jeremy Corbyn is elected leader of the Labour Party					
3–4 Sep	40%	40%	20%	1,004	Survation	
18–19 Aug	44%	37%	20%	1,676	YouGov	
13–17 Aug	50%	40%	10%	3,402	YouGov	
23–29 Jul	45%	37%	19%	1,708	YouGov	
16 Jul	Tim Farron is elected leader of the Liberal Democrats					
29 Jun–6 Jul	45%	37%	18%	5,008	Survation	Includes Northern Ireland
19–24 Jun	44%	38%	18%	1,653	YouGov	
19–21 Jun	55%	45%	N/A	2,000	ORB	
14–16 Jun	66%	22%	12%	501	Ipsos MORI	
8–11 Jun	43%	36%	21%	2,381	YouGov	
1–2 Jun	44%	34%	21%	1,063	YouGov	
27 May–2 Jun	42%	35%	22%	2,956	YouGov	
29–31 May	58%	31%	11%	500	ComRes	
28–31 May	47%	33%	20%	680	ICM	
21–22 May	44%	36%	20%	1,532	YouGov	
8–15 May	47%	40%	13%	3,977	Survation	
7 Apr–13 May	55%	36%	9%	999	Pew Research Center	
8–9 May	45%	36%	19%	1,302	YouGov	
8–9 May	45%	38%	18%	1,027	Survation	
7 May	2015 United Kingdom general election					
3–5 May	56%	34%	10%	1,011	ComRes	
3–4 May	45%	33%	21%	1,664	YouGov	
28–29 Apr	52%	32%	16%	1,823	YouGov	
23–28 Apr	47%	33%	20%	1,834	YouGov	
19–20 Apr	45%	35%	20%	2,078	YouGov	
10–12 Apr	40%	39%	21%	2,036	Populus	
8–9 Apr	45%	41%	15%	1,750	Opinium	
26–30 Mar	35%	34%	31%	1,197	TNS-BMRB	
24–26 Mar	49%	44%	7%	1,007	Panelbase	Includes Northern Ireland
18–25 Mar	41%	38%	21%	2,006	YouGov	
22–23 Mar	46%	36%	18%	1,641	YouGov	
18–23 Mar	42%	34%	23%	8,271	YouGov	
23–24 Feb	45%	37%	18%	1,520	YouGov	
22–23 Feb	45%	35%	20%	1,772	YouGov	
17–20 Feb	41%	44%	15%	1,975	Opinium	
25–26 Jan	43%	37%	20%	1,656	YouGov	
18–19 Jan	43%	38%	18%	1,747	YouGov	
15–19 Jan	38%	34%	28%	1,188	TNS-BMRB	
6–8 Jan	37%	40%	23%	1,201	TNS-BMRB	

=== 2014 ===
Date(s) conducted	Remain	Leave	Undecided	Sample	Conducted by	Notes
14–15 Dec	40%	39%	21%	1,648	YouGov	
30 Nov–1 Dec	42%	39%	20%	1,763	YouGov	
20–26 Nov	38%	43%	19%	1,641	YouGov	
21–23 Nov	32%	48%	20%	2,049	ComRes	
20–21 Nov	40%	41%	19%	1,970	YouGov	
19–21 Nov	40%	41%	19%	2,314	YouGov	
16–17 Nov	39%	39%	21%	1,589	YouGov	
7 Nov	31%	54%	15%	1,020	Survation	
2–3 Nov	38%	41%	21%	1,652	YouGov	
31 Oct–2 Nov	35%	49%	17%	2,012	Survation	
30–31 Oct	37%	43%	20%	1,808	YouGov	
27–28 Oct	35%	44%	21%	2,052	YouGov	
23–24 Oct	41%	40%	19%	2,069	YouGov	
19–20 Oct	40%	39%	21%	1,727	YouGov	
11–14 Oct	56%	36%	8%	1,002	Ipsos MORI	
21–22 Sep	42%	38%	19%	1,671	YouGov	
18 Sep	2014 Scottish independence referendum					
25–26 Aug	41%	40%	19%	2,021	YouGov	
10–11 Aug	40%	38%	22%	1,676	YouGov	
13–14 Jul	41%	38%	21%	1,745	YouGov	
29–30 Jun	40%	39%	21%	1,729	YouGov	
27–29 Jun	36%	43%	21%	2,049	ComRes	
27–28 Jun	39%	47%	14%	1,000	Survation	
26–27 Jun	39%	37%	24%	1,936	YouGov	
19–20 Jun	39%	39%	21%	2,016	YouGov	
17–19 Jun	37%	48%	15%	1,946	Opinium	
15–16 Jun	44%	36%	20%	1,696	YouGov	
30 May–1 Jun	40%	42%	18%	2,062	ComRes	
29–30 May	41%	39%	20%	2,090	YouGov	
22 May	European Parliament election, 2014					
20–21 May	42%	37%	21%	6,124	YouGov	
18–19 May	43%	37%	20%	1,740	YouGov	
10–12 May	54%	37%	10%	1,003	Ipsos MORI	
28 Apr–6 May	39%	38%	23%	1,805	YouGov	
2–3 May	39%	46%	15%	1,005	Survation	
24–28 Apr	41%	49%	10%	1,199	TNS-BMRB	
24–25 Apr	40%	37%	23%	1,835	YouGov	
21–22 Apr	40%	38%	23%	2,190	YouGov	
3–4 Apr	42%	37%	21%	1,998	YouGov	
27–28 Mar	42%	36%	21%	1,916	YouGov	
23–24 Mar	42%	36%	22%	1,558	YouGov	
9–10 Mar	41%	39%	20%	3,195	YouGov	
9–10 Feb	36%	39%	25%	1,685	YouGov	
7–20 Jan	41%	41%	18%	20,058	Lord Ashcroft Polls	
12–13 Jan	33%	43%	24%	1,762	YouGov	

=== 2013 ===
Date(s) conducted	Remain	Leave	Undecided	Sample	Conducted by	Notes
1–9 Dec	37%	43%	20%	Unknown	YouGov	
10–11 Nov	39%	39%	22%	Unknown	YouGov	
13–14 Oct	42%	37%	20%	Unknown	YouGov	
23–27 Sep	36%	44%	20%	1,922	YouGov	
15–16 Sep	42%	39%	20%	Unknown	YouGov	
18–19 Aug	46%	34%	20%	Unknown	YouGov	
6–8 Aug	32%	53%	15%	1,945	Opinium	
4–5 Aug	43%	35%	22%	Unknown	YouGov	
18–24 Jul	35%	45%	21%	1,968	YouGov	
22–23 Jul	45%	35%	21%	Unknown	YouGov	
7–8 Jul	43%	36%	21%	Unknown	YouGov	
4–5 Jul	36%	46%	19%	1,022	YouGov	
23–24 Jun	45%	31%	24%	Unknown	YouGov	
9–10 Jun	43%	35%	22%	Unknown	YouGov	
1–3 Jun	44%	45%	11%	1,566	Survation	
28–29 May	43%	35%	22%	Unknown	YouGov	
21–28 May	41%	38%	20%	1,512	YouGov	
17–18 May	36%	50%	14%	1,000	Survation	
16–17 May	36%	45%	19%	1,809	YouGov	
15–16 May	24%	46%	30%	2,017	ComRes/Sunday Mirror/Independent	Northern Ireland not sampled
15–16 May	30%	46%	24%	2,017	ICM/The Telegraph	
12–13 May	34%	44%	22%	1,748	YouGov/The Sun	Northern Ireland not sampled
10–12 May	40%	43%	17%	1,001	ICM/The Guardian	
9–10 May	30%	47%	23%	1,945	YouGov/The Sun	Northern Ireland not sampled
7 May	35%	46%	20%	719	YouGov/The Times	Northern Ireland not sampled
7–8 April	36%	43%	21%	1,765	YouGov/The Sun	Northern Ireland not sampled
4–27 March	46%	46%	8%	1,012	Pew Research Center	Includes Northern Ireland
17–18 February	38%	41%	21%	1,713	YouGov/The Sun	Northern Ireland not sampled
5 February	30%	41%	22%	1,237	TNS BMRB	
29 Jan – 6 Feb	33%	50%	17%	2,114	Financial Times/Harris	
25 January	36%	50%	16%	1,005	Survation/Mail on Sunday	Northern Ireland not sampled
24–25 January	37%	39%	24%	1,943	YouGov/Sunday Times	Northern Ireland not sampled
23 January	David Cameron announces there will be a British In/out EU referendum before 2018.					
23 January	37%	40%	23%	2,000	Populus/The Times	
20–21 January	37%	40%	24%	Unknown	YouGov/The Sun	Northern Ireland not sampled
17–18 January	40%	34%	20%	1,912	YouGov/Sunday Times	Northern Ireland not sampled
10–11 January	36%	42%	21%	1,995	YouGov/Sunday Times	Northern Ireland not sampled
6 January	36%	54%	10%	1,002	Survation/Mail on Sunday	Northern Ireland not sampled
2–3 January	31%	46%	22%	Unknown	YouGov/The Sun	Northern Ireland not sampled

=== 2012 ===
Date(s) conducted	Remain	Leave	Undecided	Sample	Conducted by	Notes
27–28 November	30%	51%	9%	Unknown	YouGov/The Sun	Northern Ireland not sampled
13–15 November	30%	56%	14%	1,957	Opinium/Observer	Northern Ireland not sampled

=== 2011 ===
Date(s) conducted	Remain	Leave	Undecided	Sample	Conducted by	Notes
15–16 December	41%	41%	19%	Unknown	YouGov/The Sun	Northern Ireland not sampled
8–9 December	35%	44%	20%	Unknown	YouGov/The Sun	Northern Ireland not sampled
7–8 August	30%	52%	19%	Unknown	YouGov/The Sun	Northern Ireland not sampled

=== 2010 ===
Date(s) conducted	Remain	Leave	Undecided	Sample	Conducted by	Notes
8–9 September	33%	47%	19%	Unknown	YouGov/The Sun	Northern Ireland not sampled

== Sub-national polling ==
=== England ===
Date(s) conducted	Remain	Leave	Undecided	Sample	Held by
23 June 2016	46.6%	53.4%	N/A	–	England Results
9–16 September 2015	40%	43%	17%	1,712	YouGov

=== England and Wales ===
Date(s) conducted	Remain	Leave	Undecided	Sample	Held by
23 June 2016	46.7%	53.3%	N/A	–	Results
26 June – 3 July 2015	42%	43%	15%	956	Panelbase/Sunday Times

=== London ===
Date(s) conducted	Remain	Leave	Undecided	Sample	Held by
23 June 2016	59.9%	40.1%	N/A	–	London Results
2–6 June 2016	48%	35%	13%	1,179	YouGov
26 April – 1 May 2016	51%	34%	14%	1,005	Opinium/Evening Standard
4–6 January 2016	39%	34%	27%	1,156	YouGov/LBC
17–19 November 2014	45%	37%	14%	1,124	YouGov/Evening Standard
20–25 June 2013	41%	39%	20%	1,269	YouGov/Evening Standard

=== Scotland ===
Date(s) conducted	Remain	Leave	Undecided	Sample	Held by
23 June 2016	62.0%	38.0%	N/A	–	Scotland Results
6–12 Jun 2016	58%	33%	8%	1,000	Ipsos Mori/STV
4–22 May 2016	53%	24%	23%	1,008	TNS
6–10 May 2016	54%	32%	14%	1,000	ICM/The Scotsman
1–2 May 2016	58%	19%	19%	1,024	Survation/Daily Record
23–28 April 2016	57%	33%	11%	1,074	Panelbase/Sunday Times
18–25 April 2016	66%	29%	5%	1,015	Ipsos MORI/STV
1–24 April 2016	48%	21%	31%	1,012	TNS
15–20 April 2016	54%	28%	17%	1,005	Survation/Daily Record
11–15 April 2016	55%	35%	9%	1,013	BMG Research/Herald
6–15 April 2016	55%	33%	12%	1,021	Panelbase/Sunday Times
2–22 March 2016	51%	19%	29%	1,051	TNS
10–17 March 2016	53%	29%	17%	1,051	Survation/Daily Record
7–9 March 2016	48%	31%	21%	1,070	YouGov
11–16 February 2016	52%	27%	21%	951	Survation
1–7 February 2016	62%	26%	12%	1,000	Ipsos MORI
1–4 February 2016	55%	28%	18%	1,022	YouGov/The Times
6–25 January 2016	44%	21%	29%	1,016	TNS
8–14 January 2016	54%	30%	16%	1,053	Panelbase/Sunday Times
8–12 January 2016	52%	27%	21%	1,029	Survation/Daily Record
9–16 November 2015	65%	22%	13%	1,029	Ipsos MORI
9–13 October 2015	51%	31%	17%	1,026	YouGov/Times
9–30 September 2015	47%	18%	29%	1,037	TNS
22–27 September 2015	55%	30%	15%	1,004	YouGov
7–10 September 2015	51%	29%	20%	975	Survation/Scottish Daily Mail
26 June – 3 July 2015	55%	29%	16%	1,002	Panelbase/Sunday Times
3–7 July 2015	51%	26%	23%	1,045	Survation/Scottish Daily Mail
13–30 May 2015	49%	19%	26%	1,031	TNS BMRB
19–21 May 2015	54%	25%	21%	1,001	YouGov/Sunday Post
29 January – 2 February 2015	52%	29%	17%	1,001	YouGov/The Times
9–14 January 2015	42%	37%	21%	1,007	Panelbase/Wings Over Scotland
6–13 November 2014	47%	35%	18%	1,001	Survation/Daily Record
30 October − 5 November 2014	41%	38%	19%	1,000	Panelbase/Wings Over Scotland
4–9 February 2013	54%	33%	13%	1,003	Ipsos MORI/The Times

=== Wales ===
Date(s) conducted	Remain	Leave	Undecided	Sample	Held by
23 June 2016	47.5%	52.5%	N/A	–	Wales Results
30 May – 2 June 2016	41%	41%	18%	1,017	YouGov
7–11 April 2016	38%	39%	16%	1,011	YouGov
9–11 February 2016	37%	45%	18%	1,024	YouGov
21–24 September 2015	42%	38%	21%	1,010	YouGov
4–6 May 2015	47%	33%	16%	1,202	YouGov/ITV Wales
24–27 March 2015	44%	38%	14%	1,189	YouGov/ITV Wales
5–9 March 2015	43%	36%	17%	1,279	YouGov/ITV Wales
19–26 February 2015	63%	33%	4%	1,000	ICM/BBC
19–21 January 2015	44%	36%	16%	1,036	YouGov/ITV Wales
2–5 December 2014	42%	39%	15%	1,131	YouGov/ITV Wales
8–11 September 2014	43%	37%	15%	1,025	YouGov/ITV Wales
26 June – 1 July 2014	41%	36%	18%	1,035	YouGov/ITV Wales
21–24 February 2014	54%	40%	6%	1,000	ICM/BBC
14–25 June 2013	29%	37%	35%	1,015	Beaufort Research

=== Northern Ireland ===
Date(s) conducted	Remain	Leave	Undecided	Sample	Held by	Notes
23 June 2016	55.8%	44.2%	N/A	–	Northern Ireland Results	
Late June 2016	37%	26%	NA	Over 1,000	Belfast Telegraph / IPSOS MORI	
20 June 2016	57%	43%	Exc. DKs	2,090	The NI Sun/LucidTalk	
17–19 May 2016	57%	35%	9%	1,090	LucidTalk	
May 2016	44%	20%	35%	1,005	Ipsos MORI	Question phrased differently.
19–21 October 2015	56.5%	28.3%	15.2%	2,517	LucidTalk	
2–16 October 2015	55%	13%	32%	1,012	BBC/RTÉ	

=== Gibraltar ===
Date(s) conducted	Remain	Leave	Undecided	Sample	Held by
23 June 2016	95.9%	4.1%	N/A	–	Gibraltar Results
13–15 May 2016	94%	2%	4%	596	Gibraltar Chronicle
11–15 April 2016	88%	8%	3%	596	Gibraltar Chronicle

== Renegotiated terms ==
The UK government renegotiated certain terms of the UK's membership of the European Union before the referendum was held. Prior to the renegotiation in February 2016, some opinion polls asked the referendum question on the assumption that the UK government would say that it was satisfied with the outcome of the renegotiation.

Date(s) conducted	Remain	Leave	Undecided	Sample	Held by	Notes
1–2 June 2015	55%	24%	18%	1,063	YouGov/Prospect	Northern Ireland not sampled
8–9 May 2015	58%	24%	16%	1,302	YouGov/Sunday Times	Northern Ireland not sampled
3–4 May 2015	56%	20%	20%	1,664	YouGov/The Sun	Northern Ireland not sampled
19–20 April 2015	57%	22%	17%	2,078	YouGov/The Sun	Northern Ireland not sampled
22–23 March 2015	57%	22%	18%	1,641	YouGov/The Sun	Northern Ireland not sampled
22–23 February 2015	57%	21%	17%	1,772	YouGov/The Sun	Northern Ireland not sampled
25–26 January 2015	54%	25%	16%	1,656	YouGov/The Sun	Northern Ireland not sampled
18–19 January 2015	57%	21%	19%	1,747	YouGov/British Influence	Northern Ireland not sampled
14–15 Dec 2014	55%	24%	16%	1,648	YouGov/The Sun	
30 Nov – 1 December 2014	55%	25%	17%	1,763	YouGov/The Sun	
17–19 November 2014	58%	25%	13%	1,124	YouGov / The Evening Standard	
16–17 November 2014	58%	24%	14%	1,589	YouGov / The Sun	
4–7 November 2014	40%	43%	17%	1,707	Opinium/The Observer	
2–3 November 2014	52%	27%	15%	1,652	YouGov / The Sun	
19–20 October 2014	55%	24%	17%	1,727	YouGov / The Sun	
21–22 September 2014	54%	25%	16%	1,671	YouGov / The Sun	
25–26 August 2014	54%	26%	16%	2,021	YouGov / The Sun	
10–11 August 2014	54%	23%	18%	1,676	YouGov / The Sun	
13–14 July 2014	52%	25%	19%	1,745	YouGov / The Sun	
29–30 June 2014	54%	23%	17%	1,729	YouGov / The Sun	
15–16 June 2014	57%	22%	16%	1,696	YouGov / The Sun	
18–19 May 2014	53%	24%	18%	1,740	YouGov	Northern Ireland not sampled
24–25 April 2014	50%	26%	18%	1,835	YouGov/Sunday Times	Northern Ireland not sampled
21–22 April 2014	52%	26%	18%	2,190	YouGov/The Sun	Northern Ireland not sampled
23–24 March 2014	54%	25%	17%	2,190	YouGov/The Sun	Northern Ireland not sampled
9–10 March 2014	52%	27%	16%	3,195	YouGov/The Sun	Northern Ireland not sampled
9–10 February 2014	47%	27%	18%	1,685	YouGov/The Sun	Northern Ireland not sampled
12–13 January 2014	48%	29%	18%	1,762	YouGov/The Sun	Northern Ireland not sampled
12–13 May 2013	45%	33%	19%	1,748	YouGov/The Sun	Northern Ireland not sampled
9–10 May 2013	45%	32%	20%	1,945	YouGov/Sunday Times	Northern Ireland not sampled
7–8 April 2013	46%	31%	17%	1,765	YouGov/The Sun	Northern Ireland not sampled
17–18 February 2013	52%	28%	14%	1,713	YouGov/The Sun	Northern Ireland not sampled

== Polling within professional groups ==
=== Business leaders ===
The British Chambers of Commerce surveyed 2,200 business leaders in January and February 2016. Of these, 60% supported remaining in the EU and 30% supported exit. In a further poll published in May, these numbers had changed to 54% and 37%, respectively.

The Confederation of British Industry reported a survey of 773 of its members, carried out by ComRes. With numbers adjusted to reflect CBI membership, the poll indicated that 80% of CBI members saw a "remain" outcome as the best outcome for their business, with 5% seeing "leave" as the best outcome.

In a poll of 350 board directors of UK businesses, published in June 2015, 82% agreed with the statement that "the UK's membership of the EU is good for British businesses", while 12% disagreed. In a follow-up poll reported in March 2016, 63% agreed that "British businesses are better off inside the European Union than out of it" while 20% disagreed. To the statement, "An EU exit risks stifling British business growth", 59% agreed and 30% disagreed. To the statement, "Our membership of the EU gives British businesses invaluable access to European markets", 71% agreed and 16% disagreed. To the statement "An EU exit would leave British businesses facing a skills shortage", 35% agreed and 50% disagreed.

The manufacturers' organisation EEF used the market research organisation GfK to conduct a survey in late 2015 of 500 senior decision-makers in manufacturing organisations. Of these, 63% wanted the UK to stay in the EU, and 5% wanted it to leave. Three percent said there was no advantage to their businesses for the UK to be in the EU, against 50% who said it was important and a further 20% who said it was critical for their business.

Two surveys by consultants Deloitte asked 120 Chief Financial Officers of large UK companies "whether it is in the interests of UK businesses for the UK to remain a member of the EU". In the first survey, conducted in the final quarter of 2015, 62% agreed while 6% disagreed. A further 28% said they would withhold their judgement until the renegotiation in February 2016. The second survey, conducted in early 2016, had 75% saying it was in the interest of UK businesses to remain, with 8% saying it was not.

In April 2016, the International Chamber of Commerce published a survey of 226 businesses from 27 different countries. Of these international businesses, 46% said they would reduce investment in the UK if it left the EU, while 1% said Brexit would increase their investment in the UK. As to whether the UK should leave the EU, 8% thought it should, while 86% wanted the UK to remain.

In May 2016, law firm King & Wood Mallesons published a survey of 300 businesses, equally split between France, Spain, Italy, and Germany. Asked about the prospect of the UK leaving the EU, 68% said it would adversely affect their businesses and 62% said they would be less likely to do business in the UK. When asked to name ways in which their businesses could benefit from Brexit, a majority of respondents in France, Italy, and Spain said that their countries could benefit as companies move jobs out of the UK.

=== Scientists ===
In March 2016, Nature reported a survey of 907 active science researchers based in the UK. Of these, 78% said exit from the EU would be "somewhat harmful" or "very harmful" for UK science, with 9% saying it would be "somewhat beneficial" or "very beneficial". Asked, "Should the UK exit the EU or remain?", 83% chose "remain" and 12% "exit". The journal also surveyed a further 954 scientists based in the EU but outside the UK. Of these, 47% said the UK's exit would be "harmful" or "very harmful" for science in the EU, with 11.5% choosing "beneficial" or "very beneficial".

=== Lawyers ===
Legal Week surveyed almost 350 partners in legal firms. Of these, 77% said that a UK exit from the EU would have a "negative" or "very negative" effect on the City's position in global financial markets, with 6.2% predicting a "positive" effect. Asked about the effect on their own firms, 59% of the partners predicted a "quite adverse" or "very adverse" effect, while 13% said the effect would be "quite positive" or "very positive".

=== Economists ===
The Financial Times surveyed 105 economists about how an exit from the EU would affect their views of the UK's prospects, publishing the results in January 2016. In the medium term, 76 respondents (72%) said the UK's prospects would be worse, 8 (7.6%) said they would be better, and 18 (17%) predicted no difference.

Ipsos MORI surveyed members of the Royal Economic Society and the Society of Business Economists for The Observer, with 639 responses. Over the next five years, 88% said that Brexit would have a negative effect on GDP, 7% said it would have no impact, and 3% said there would it would have a positive impact, while 82% said it would have a negative effect on household incomes, 9% said it would have no impact, and 7% said it would have a positive effect. Over ten to twenty years, 72% said it would have a negative effect on GDP, 11% said it would have no impact and 11% said it would have a positive effect, while 73% said it would have a negative effect on household income, 13% said it would have no impact, and 10% said it would have a positive effect.

== Other opinion polling ==
In a poll released in December 2015, Lord Ashcroft asked 20,000 people in the UK to place themselves on a scale of 0–100 of how likely they were vote to remain or leave. A total of 47% placed themselves in the "leave" end of the scale, 38% in the "remain" end and 14% were completely undecided.

=== On British withdrawal ===
- France – A poll conducted by French daily newspaper Le Parisien in January 2013 found that 52% of French voters were in favour of the UK withdrawing from the EU. Of the 1,136 people polled, in conjunction with French research agency BVA in January 2013, 48% said they would rather the UK remained inside the EU.
- Germany – A study carried out by Internationale Politik in January 2013 found 64% of Germans favoured the UK remaining inside the EU – with 36% saying they favoured an exit. The biggest support for retaining the union with the UK was with the younger generation with 69% of 18- to 25-year-olds saying they wanted the UK to stay. Amongst the German political parties, the supporters of the Green Party remained most favourable at 85%.

==== Ashcroft polling ====
In early 2016, UK Conservative Party peer Michael Ashcroft polled an unspecified number of individuals in each of the other European Union member states to gauge opinion on whether they thought the United Kingdom should leave the EU, whether they thought the UK should remain a member or whether they believed it did not matter. All member states said that they wanted the UK to remain a member, except Cyprus, the Czech Republic and Slovenia, with Lithuania being most in favour, at 78% of respondents being for the UK to remain in the EU.

Country	Remain	Does not matter	Leave	Sample
Austria	41%	41%	19%	1,016
Belgium	49%	38%	13%	1,053
Bulgaria	67%	27%	7%	1,006
Croatia	49%	41%	10%	1,007
Cyprus	35%	45%	19%	252
Czech Republic	40%	47%	13%	1,002
Denmark	56%	31%	13%	1,015
Estonia	65%	28%	8%	1,010
Finland	50%	39%	11%	1,032
France	50%	32%	18%	1,084
Germany	59%	30%	11%	1,108
Greece	50%	35%	15%	1,024
Hungary	64%	30%	7%	1,021
Ireland	72%	18%	10%	1,012
Italy	67%	24%	9%	1,061
Latvia	58%	33%	9%	1,015
Lithuania	78%	16%	6%	1,013
Luxembourg	55%	21%	24%	505
Malta	76%	18%	6%	259
Netherlands	49%	42%	10%	1,036
Poland	67%	27%	6%	1,024
Portugal	74%	20%	7%	1,010
Romania	70%	26%	4%	1,014
Slovakia	61%	32%	7%	1,005
Slovenia	43%	49%	8%	1,011
Spain	70%	24%	6%	1,057
Sweden	56%	33%	12%	1,019
EU27	60%	30%	10%	25,671

Additionally, Ashcroft asked the same group of people whether they would be happy for the UK to remain in the European Union to renegotiated terms or whether they thought the UK should leave if they do not like their current terms of membership. Newer countries to the European Union, countries which have joined the Union since 2004, were the biggest supporters: 52% supported the renegotiated position, compared to just 40% of respondents from EU members who joined before 2004.

Country	Remain	Leave
Austria	24%	76%
Belgium	34%	66%
Bulgaria	52%	48%
Croatia	36%	64%
Cyprus	33%	67%
Czech Republic	42%	58%
Denmark	51%	49%
Estonia	44%	56%
Finland	30%	70%
France	36%	64%
Germany	35%	65%
Greece	39%	61%
Hungary	61%	39%
Ireland	54%	46%
Italy	50%	50%
Latvia	49%	51%
Lithuania	64%	36%
Luxembourg	26%	74%
Malta	69%	31%
Netherlands	37%	63%
Poland	52%	48%
Portugal	61%	39%
Romania	59%	41%
Slovakia	47%	53%
Slovenia	29%	71%
Spain	43%	57%
Sweden	37%	63%
EU27	43%	57%

==== ICM polling ====
An ICM online poll of 1,000 adults in each of nine European countries (including Norway, not an EU member state) in November 2015 found an average of 53% in favour of the UK's remaining in the EU.

Country	Remain	Leave
Denmark	46%	24%
Finland	49%	19%
France	51%	22%
Germany	55%	19%
Italy	63%	20%
Norway	34%	27%
Portugal	74%	8%
Spain	69%	11%
Sweden	43%	26%

== See also ==
- Opinion polling for the 2024 United Kingdom general election
