= Jamie Reed =

British politician (born 1973)

Shadow Minister for Health
- In office 7 October 2011 – 18 September 2015
- Leader: Ed Miliband; Harriet Harman (acting)
- Preceded by: Derek Twigg
- Succeeded by: Justin Madders

Shadow Minister for Natural Environment and Fisheries
- In office 8 October 2010 – 7 October 2011
- Leader: Ed Miliband
- Preceded by: Position established
- Succeeded by: Fiona O'Donnell

Member of Parliament for Copeland
- In office 5 May 2005 – 23 January 2017
- Preceded by: Jack Cunningham
- Succeeded by: Trudy Harrison

Personal details
- Born: 4 August 1973 (age 53) Whitehaven, England, UK
- Party: Labour
- Education: Manchester Metropolitan University; University of Leicester

Jamieson Ronald "Jamie" Reed (born 4 August 1973) is a British former politician who served as Member of Parliament (MP) for Copeland from 2005 to 2017. A member of the Labour Party, he was a Shadow Environment, Food and Rural Affairs Minister from 2010 to 2011 and a Shadow Health Minister from 2011 to 2015.

== Early life and career ==
Reed was born in Whitehaven, Cumbria and educated at Whitehaven School. He graduated with a BA in English from Manchester Metropolitan University and an MA in Mass Communications from the University of Leicester.

Before his election to Parliament, he worked as a Press Officer at Sellafield, a nuclear reprocessing and decommissioning site, and served on Copeland Borough Council.

== Parliamentary career ==
In his maiden speech Reed declared himself to be a Jedi in the debate over the Racial and Religious Hatred Bill under consideration in Parliament. His comment was intended to be taken ironically and raise the issue of how the Bill would define what was and was not a religion.

Jamie Reed has also referred to himself as a "good Methodist" in parliamentary debate:

As a good Methodist, I shall refuse the opportunity to bet. My hon. friend mentioned the economic estimates done by a German economist on the amount of money spent on nuclear technology and nuclear research and development. Are we talking principally about the civil nuclear sector? Is the military nuclear sector also included? He also mentioned the IAEA. It does not exist to promote the nuclear industry; it exists to give it some kind of international regulatory framework.

In November 2006, Reed was appointed Parliamentary Private Secretary (PPS) to Tony McNulty, Minister of State Policing, Security and Community Safety. He became PPS to Harriet Harman, Leader of the House of Commons and Minister for Women, in October 2008. Reed served on the opposition front bench as a Shadow Environment Minister from 2010 to 2010, and a Shadow Health Minister from 2011 to 2015.

He spoke out to assist his party leader Ed Miliband, who declared he felt "respect" on seeing a white van, following Emily Thornberry's "White Van Gate" tweet during the 2014 Rochester and Strood by-election campaign, stating during PMQs: "When I see a white van, I wonder whether it's my father or my brother who is driving".

On 12 September 2015, one minute into Jeremy Corbyn's acceptance speech as leader of the Labour Party, he publicly resigned as shadow Health Minister giving as his reason Corbyn's opposition to nuclear energy. During a House of Commons debate on the renewal of Britain's nuclear deterrent, which Corbyn personally opposes, he described the Labour leader as "reckless, juvenile and narcissistic". He supported Owen Smith in the failed attempt to replace Jeremy Corbyn in the 2016 Labour Party (UK) leadership election.

He announced on 21 December 2016 that he would be resigning his seat at the end of January 2017 in order to take up a new role as Head of Development and Community Relations for Sellafield Ltd, triggering a by-election, which was won by Conservative Trudy Harrison. Reed formally resigned by taking the post of Steward of the Manor of Northstead on 23 January 2017.

Parliament of the United Kingdom
Preceded by Jack Cunningham	Member of Parliament for Copeland; 2005–2017	Succeeded by Trudy Harrison
