= Trudy Harrison =

British Conservative politician (born 1976)

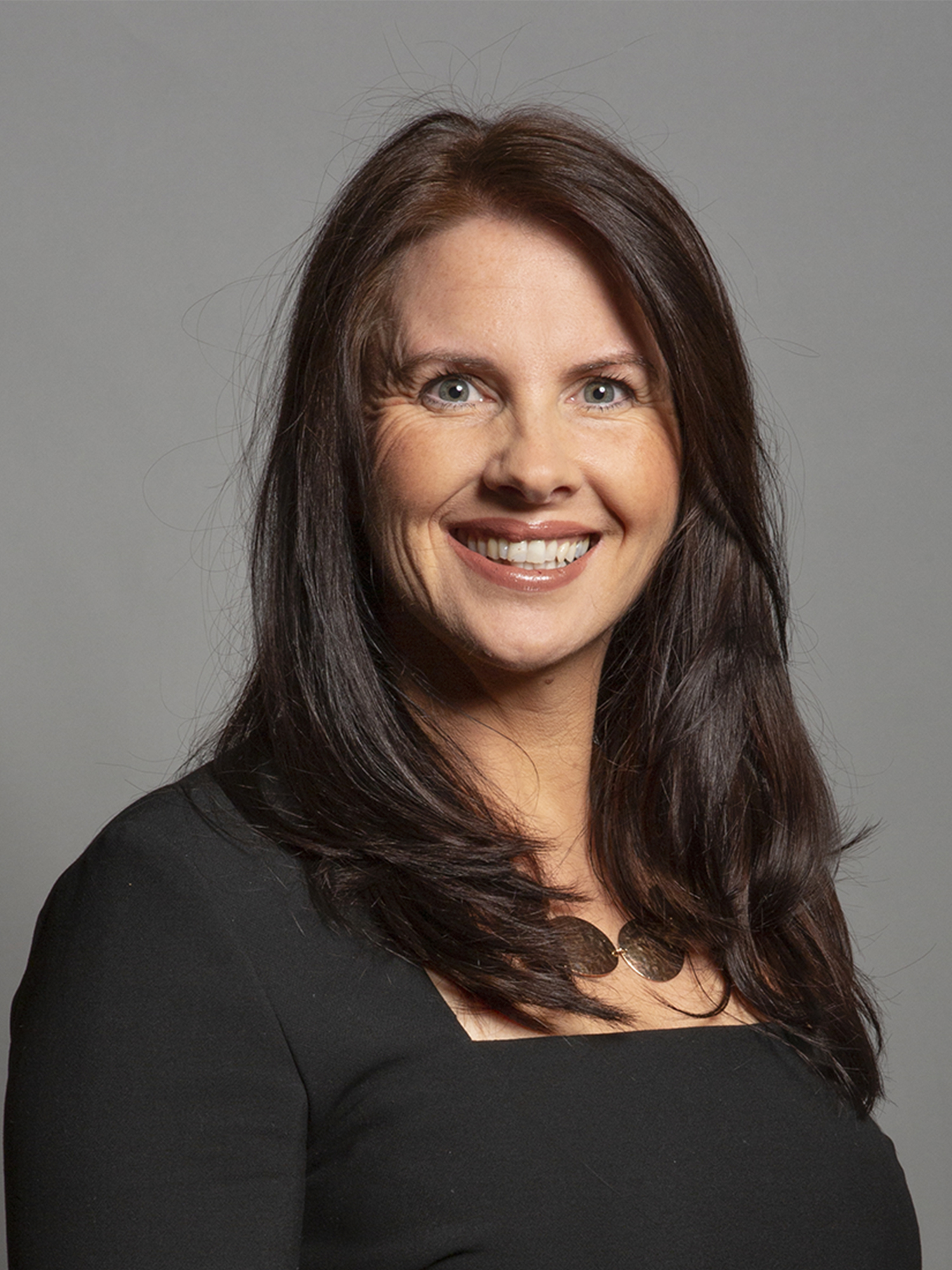
- Official portrait, 2019

Parliamentary Under-Secretary of State for Natural Environment and Land Use (Note: Parliamentary Under-Secretary of State for Environment (September to October 2022))
- In office 8 September 2022 – 13 November 2023
- Prime Minister: Liz Truss; Rishi Sunak
- Preceded by: Steve Double
- Succeeded by: Rebecca Pow

Minister of State for Transport
- In office 7 July 2022 – 7 September 2022
- Prime Minister: Boris Johnson
- Preceded by: Andrew Stephenson
- Succeeded by: Lucy Frazer

Parliamentary Under-Secretary of State for Transport
- In office 16 September 2021 – 7 July 2022
- Prime Minister: Boris Johnson
- Preceded by: Rachel Maclean
- Succeeded by: Karl McCartney

Parliamentary Private Secretary to the Prime Minister
- In office 16 December 2019 – 16 September 2021 Serving with Alex Burghart
- Prime Minister: Boris Johnson
- Preceded by: James Heappey
- Succeeded by: Sarah Dines; Andrew Griffith

Member of Parliament for Copeland
- In office 23 February 2017 – 30 May 2024
- Preceded by: Jamie Reed
- Succeeded by: Constituency abolished

Personal details
- Born: 19 April 1976 (age 50) Seascale, Cumbria, England
- Party: Conservative (since 2016)
- Other political affiliations: Independent (2004 to 2007)
- Children: 4
- Education: University of Salford

Trudy Lynne Harrison (born 19 April 1976) is a British Conservative Party politician who served as the Member of Parliament (MP) for Copeland from the February 2017 by-election to the 2024 general election. Her election marked the first time Copeland had elected a Conservative MP since 1931, and the first time the constituency had elected a female MP. Three months after her by-election victory, Harrison was re-elected in the 2017 general election and held her seat in 2019.

In December 2019, Harrison was appointed Parliamentary Private Secretary to Prime Minister Boris Johnson. In September 2021, she was appointed Parliamentary Under-Secretary of State at the Department for Transport; she was promoted to Minister of State in the same department in July 2022.

She was appointed Parliamentary Under-Secretary of State for Environment by Prime Minister Liz Truss in September 2022. She was reappointed by Rishi Sunak.

== Early life ==
Harrison was born and brought up in Seascale, England. She was educated at Wyndham School, Egremont. After leaving school, Harrison worked for five years as a technical clerk at Sellafield, before running a childcare business for five years. After taking a four-year career break, two shorter stints of employment followed at Copeland Borough Council, where she worked as a Locality Officer and Community Regeneration Officer. During this time, she completed a Foundation Degree in Sustainable Communities at the University of Salford.

Prior to standing for Parliament, Harrison had been working on 'Bootle2020' and 'The Wellbank Project' – a linked set of projects for bringing new development to Bootle. The Wellbank Project included several phases of proposed property development, with the first phase consisting of eighteen new residential units, which were due to have been built by summer 2018.

As of August 2025, five residential units have been constructed at Wellbank.

== Political career ==
Harrison served as an independent parish councillor in Bootle, Cumbria from 2004 to 2007. Following the resignation of Jamie Reed, the incumbent Labour Party MP for Copeland, Harrison was selected by the Conservative Party to contest the subsequent by-election- having only joined the party one year earlier. The by-election was fought by both the Conservatives and Labour over a number of local issues. Harrison campaigned on a strongly pro-nuclear stance in contrast to Jeremy Corbyn, the leader of the Labour Party. She promised to safeguard thousands of jobs in the constituency by supporting the existing Sellafield site and the possible future Moorside Nuclear Power Station. She also campaigned on a pro-Brexit line and said that Labour wanted "to ignore how we voted in the referendum."

Harrison won the by-election with a majority of 2,147. Her election was seen by many commentators to be historic and a blow to Jeremy Corbyn's leadership of Labour. Her victory in the historically solid Labour constituency was the first by-election gain by a governing party since the 1982 Mitcham and Morden by-election and was also the best by-election performance by a governing party in terms of the increase in its share of the vote since January 1966.

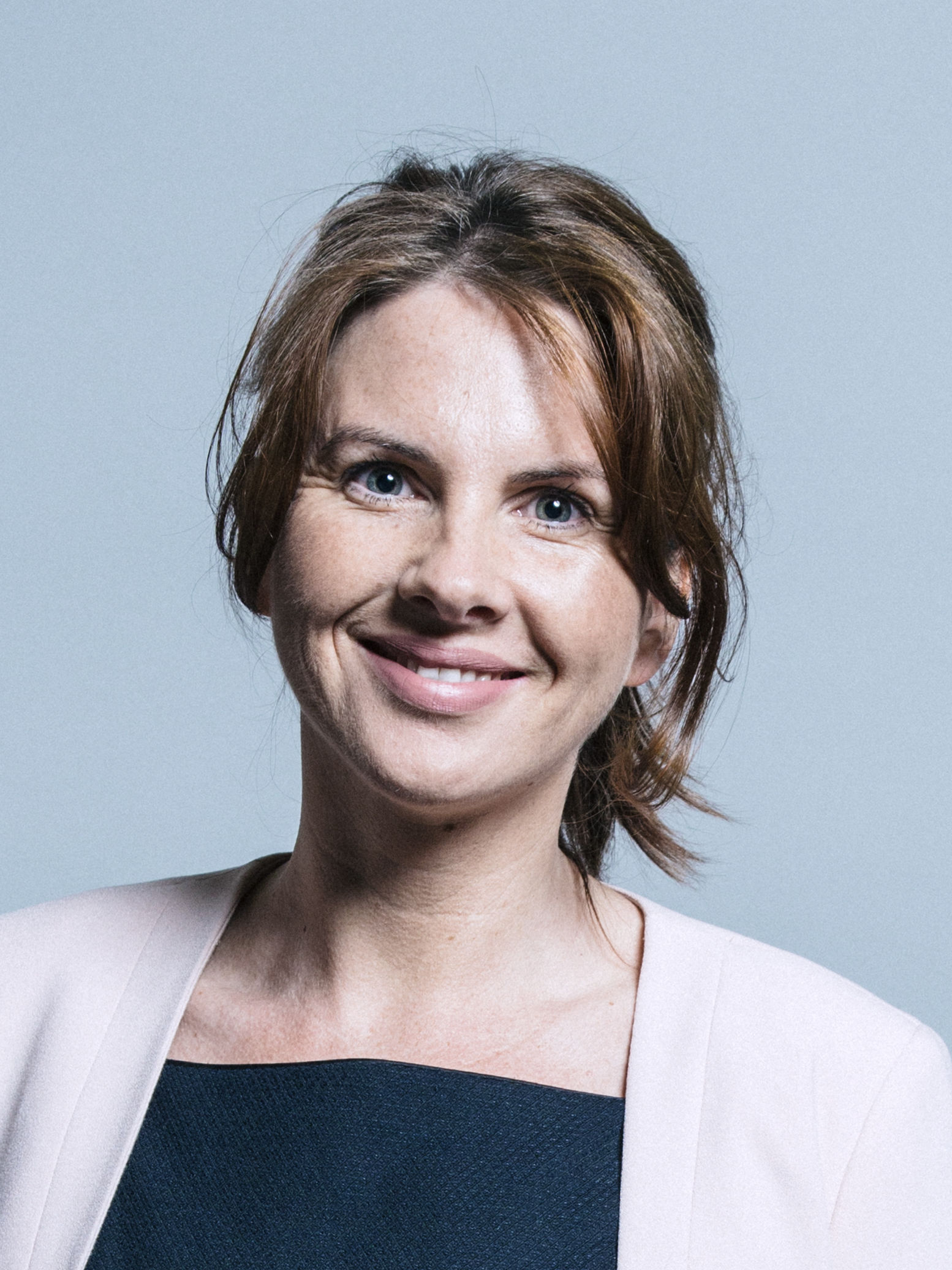
Official portrait, 2017

Harrison made her maiden speech on 25 April 2017, shortly before the General Election, at which she was re-elected. It was well received by The Times newspaper. In her first year in office she was subject to some criticism locally for not holding Constituency Surgeries and for being difficult to contact, as well as limited submissions of written parliamentary questions. She defended her record by pointing to fears over the safety of politicians, following the murder of Jo Cox.

On 6 March 2018, Harrison introduced a Ten Minute Rule Motion that seeks to introduce a ban on wild animals in circuses. This was introduced to the Commons as a Private Members Bill, where Harrison stated "Making wild animals travel in crates and perform unnatural tasks for our amusement does not have my support and nor does it have the support of the public."

Harrison previously served as Parliamentary Private Secretary to the Ministry of Defence ministerial team. Harrison served on the Education Committee and was later the Private Parliamentary Secretary to the Secretary of State for Education.

Harrison has questioned the current efficacy of family courts, arguing that they often disadvantage sufferers of domestic abuse.

In July 2019, Harrison supported Michael Gove in the 2019 Conservative Party leadership election.

In October 2019, Harrison voted for Boris Johnson's Brexit deal.

Harrison supports the construction of the UK's first deep coal mine to be built in Copeland. The mine was a topic of contention in West Cumbria, with little to no progress ever made during the Harrison years.

Harrison stood for, and won, re-election in Copeland at the 2019 general election. Following this she was made Parliamentary Private Secretary to the Prime Minister.

In December 2019, Harrison was appointed Parliamentary Private Secretary to the Prime Minister Boris Johnson, serving alongside Alex Burghart.

On 17 September 2021, Harrison was appointed Parliamentary Under-Secretary of State at the Department for Transport, during the second cabinet reshuffle of the second Johnson ministry.

Harrison was appointed a Minister of State for Transport on 7 July 2022, serving alongside Wendy Morton.

Harrison was appointed Parliamentary Under Secretary of State in the Department for Environment, Food and Rural Affairs on 7 September 2022.

In July 2023, Harrison announced that she would stand down as an MP at the 2024 general election.

== Personal life ==
Harrison lives in Bootle, Cumbria and London with her husband Keith, who works as a welder for Shepley Engineers Ltd in the local area, and her four daughters.

== Notes ==
Parliament of the United Kingdom
Preceded by Jamie Reed	Member of Parliament for Copeland; 2017–2024	Constituency abolished
