= Opinion polling for the 2017 United Kingdom general election =

Opinion polling for the 2017 United Kingdom general election was carried out by various organisations to gauge voting intention. Most of the polling companies listed are members of the British Polling Council (BPC) and abide by its disclosure rules. The opinion polls listed range from the previous election on 7 May 2015 to the election on 8 June 2017.

Under the Fixed-term Parliaments Act 2011, the next general election after 2015 was not scheduled to be held until 7 May 2020. However, on 18 April 2017, Prime Minister Theresa May announced she would seek a snap election on 8 June 2017, and this was officially triggered by a successful House of Commons motion the following day.

== Graphical summaries ==
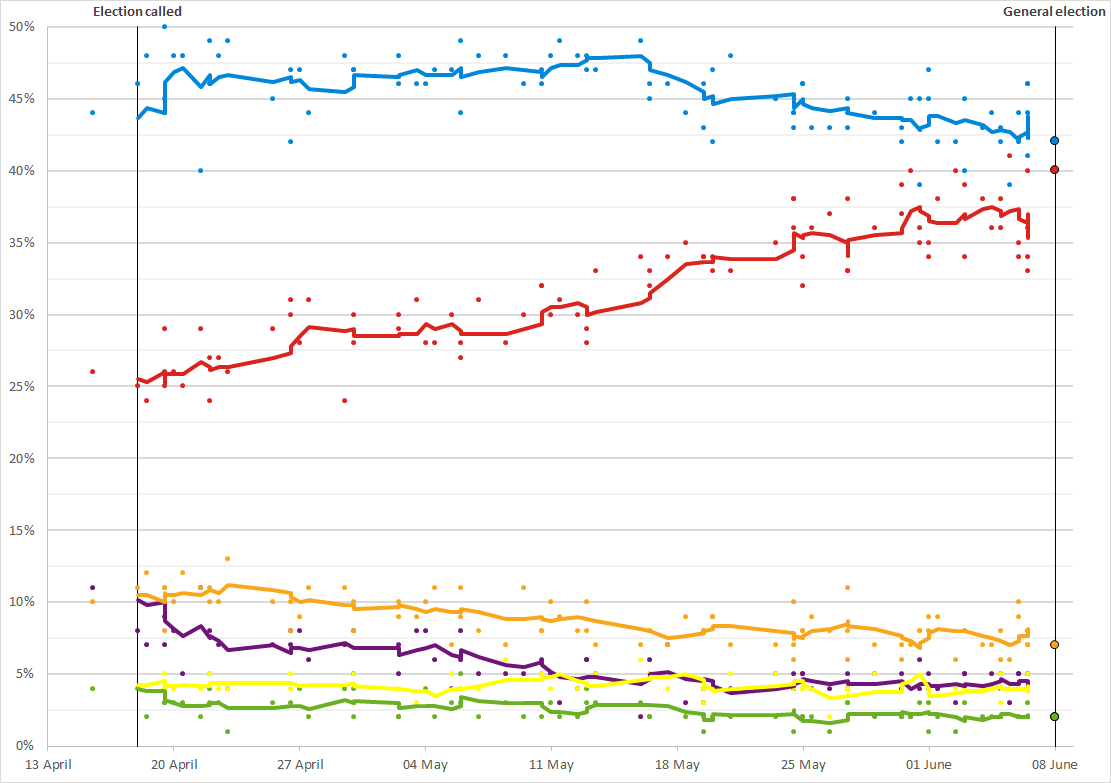

== National poll results ==
Most opinion polls do not cover Northern Ireland, which has different major political parties from the rest of the United Kingdom. The Scottish National Party (SNP) only stands candidates in Scotland. Due to rounding, total figures may not add up to 100%. The lead is calculated by subtracting the polling percentage of the first party (shaded in the party's colour, and in bold) by that of the second party.

=== 2017 ===
Date(s) conducted	Polling organisation/client	Sample size	Con	Lab	UKIP	LD	SNP	Grn	Others	Lead
8 Jun 2017	2017 general election (Note: GB results only.)	–	**43.5%**	41.0%	1.9%	7.6%	3.1%	1.7%	1.2%	2.5
6–7 Jun	Ipsos MORI/Evening Standard	1,291	**44%**	36%	4%	7%	5%	2%	2%	8
6–7 Jun	BMG/The Herald	1,199	**46%**	33%	5%	8%	4%	3%	2%	13
6–7 Jun	Survation	2,798	**41%**	40%	2%	8%	4%	2%	2%	1
6–7 Jun	ICM/The Guardian	1,532	**46%**	34%	5%	7%	5%	2%	1%	12
5–7 Jun	YouGov/The Times (Note: YouGov was worried they would get this final poll wrong as in 2015, and the poll suggested a hung parliament which they doubted. YouGov made last minute small methodology changes which transferred 2% from Labour to Conservative, increasing predicted Conservative lead from 3% to 7%. Peter Kellner wrote in 2022 this "turned an excellent poll into a mediocre one".)	2,130	**42%**	35%	5%	10%	5% (Note: Includes those expressing a voting intention for Plaid Cymru.)	2%	1%	7
5–7 Jun	ComRes/Independent	2,051	**44%**	34%	5%	9%	4%	2%	1%	10
4–7 Jun	Qriously/Wired	2,213	39%	**41%**	4%	6%	3%	7%		2
2–7 Jun	Panelbase	3,018	**44%**	36%	5%	7%	4%	2%	2%	8
1–7 Jun	Kantar Public	2,159	**43%**	38%	4%	7%	4%	2%	2%	5
4–6 Jun	Opinium	3,002	**43%**	36%	5%	8%	5%	2%	1%	7
2–4 Jun	ICM/The Guardian	2,000	**45%**	34%	5%	8%	4%	3%	1%	11
3 Jun	London Bridge terror attack, national campaigning partially suspended on 4 June									
3 Jun	Survation/Mail on Sunday	1,049	**40%**	39%	5%	8%	4%	5%		1
2–3 Jun	Survation/Good Morning Britain (Note: Telephone.)	1,103	**41%**	40%	3%	6%	4%	1%	4%	1
1–2 Jun	YouGov/Sunday Times	1,989	**42%**	38%	4%	9%	4%	2%	0%	4
31 May – 2 Jun	ICM/The Sun on Sunday	2,051	**45%**	34%	5%	9%	4%	3%	1%	11
31 May – 2 Jun	ComRes/Sunday Mirror, Independent on Sunday	2,038	**47%**	35%	4%	8%	3%	1%	1%	12
31 May – 1 Jun	Norstat	1,013	**39%**	35%	6%	8%	*	3%	9%	4
31 May – 1 Jun	ORB/Telegraph	1,656	**45%**	36%	4%	8%	7%			9
30 May – 1 Jun	Ipsos MORI/Evening Standard	1,046	**45%**	40%	2%	7%	3%	2%	1%	5
26 May – 1 Jun	Panelbase	1,224	**44%**	36%	5%	7%	5%	2%	1%	8
30–31 May	Opinium/Observer	2,006	**43%**	37%	5%	6%	5%	2%	1%	6
30–31 May	YouGov/The Times	1,875	**42%**	39%	4%	7%	4%	2%	1%	3
25–30 May	Kantar Public	1,199	**43%**	33%	4%	11%	4%	3%	1%	10
26–29 May	ICM/The Guardian	2,002	**45%**	33%	5%	8%	4%	3%	2%	12
26–29 May	Qriously	1,153	**43%**	39%	5%	6%	3%	2%	3%	4
26–27 May	Survation/Good Morning Britain	1,009	**43%**	37%	4%	8%	2%	1%	4%	6
25–26 May	YouGov/Sunday Times	2,003	**43%**	36%	4%	9%	4%	2%	1%	7
24–26 May	ICM/The Sun on Sunday	2,044	**46%**	32%	5%	8%	4%	2%	1%	14
24–26 May	ComRes/Sunday Mirror, Independent on Sunday	2,024	**46%**	34%	5%	8%	4%	2%	1%	12
24–25 May	ORB/Sunday Telegraph	1,556	**44%**	38%	5%	7%	4%	2%		6
24–25 May	YouGov/The Times	2,052	**43%**	38%	4%	10%	5%	1%	0%	5
23–24 May	Opinium/Observer	2,002	**45%**	35%	5%	7%	5%	2%	1%	10
19–23 May	Panelbase/The Sunday Times	1,019	**48%**	33%	4%	7%	5%	2%	1%	15
22 May	Manchester Arena bombing, national campaigning suspended 23–24 May									
18–22 May	Kantar Public	1,200	**42%**	34%	4%	9%	4%	4%	2%	8
19–21 May	ICM/The Guardian	2,004	**47%**	33%	4%	9%	4%	2%	1%	14
19–20 May	Survation/Good Morning Britain	1,034	**43%**	34%	4%	8%	3%	2%	5%	9
19–20 May	Survation/Mail on Sunday	1,017	**46%**	34%	3%	8%	4%	1%	3%	12
18–19 May	YouGov/Sunday Times	1,925	**44%**	35%	3%	9%	5%	2%	1%	9
17–18 May	ORB/Sunday Telegraph	1,551	**46%**	34%	7%	7%	4%	2%		12
16–17 May	Opinium/Observer	2,003	**46%**	33%	5%	8%	5%	2%	1%	13
16–17 May	YouGov/The Times	1,861	**45%**	32%	6%	8%	5%	2%	1%	13
15–17 May	Ipsos MORI/Evening Standard	1,053	**49%**	34%	2%	7%	6%	3%	*	15
12–15 May	Panelbase	1,026	**47%**	33%	5%	7%	5%	3%	*	14
11–15 May	Kantar Public	1,201	**47%**	29%	6%	8%	4%	4%	2%	18
12–14 May	ICM/The Guardian	2,030	**48%**	28%	6%	10%	4%	3%	1%	20
3–14 May	GfK/Business Insider	1,952	**48%**	28%	5%	7%	6%	3%	2%	20
12–13 May	Survation/Good Morning Britain	1,016	**48%**	30%	4%	8%	4%	2%	4%	18
11–12 May	YouGov/Sunday Times	1,630	**49%**	31%	3%	9%	5%	2%	1%	18
10–12 May	ComRes/Sunday Mirror, Independent on Sunday	2,007	**48%**	30%	5%	10%	4%	3%	1%	18
9–12 May	Opinium/Observer	2,003	**47%**	32%	5%	8%	5%	2%	1%	15
10–11 May	ORB/Sunday Telegraph	1,508	**46%**	32%	6%	8%	5%	4%		14
9–10 May	YouGov/The Times	1,651	**46%**	30%	5%	11%	6%	2%	1%	16
5–9 May	Panelbase	1,027	**48%**	31%	5%	8%	4%	2%	2%	17
4–8 May	Kantar Public	1,201	**44%**	28%	8%	11%	4%	5%	1%	16
5–7 May	ICM/The Guardian	2,038	**49%**	27%	6%	9%	4%	3%	1%	22
5–6 May	Survation/Good Morning Britain	1,005	**47%**	30%	4%	7%	5%	3%	3%	17
4–5 May	YouGov/Sunday Times	1,644	**47%**	28%	6%	11%	5%	2%	1%	19
3–5 May	ICM/Sun on Sunday	2,020	**46%**	28%	8%	10%	4%	4%	*	18
4 May	Local elections in England, Scotland and Wales; Mayoral elections in England									
3–4 May	ORB/Sunday Telegraph	1,550	**46%**	31%	8%	9%	3%	3%		15
2–3 May	Opinium/Observer	2,005	**46%**	30%	7%	9%	4%	2%	1%	16
2–3 May	YouGov/The Times	2,066	**48%**	29%	5%	10%	5%	2%	1%	19
28 Apr – 2 May	Panelbase	1,034	**47%**	30%	5%	10%	5%	2%	1%	17
28 Apr – 2 May	ICM/The Guardian	1,970	**47%**	28%	8%	8%	3%	4%	1%	19
28 Apr – 1 May	Qriously	1,240	**44%**	28%	8%	9%	3%	4%	4%	15
27 Apr – 2 May	Kantar Public	1,205	**48%**	24%	7%	11%	4%	4%	2%	24
27–28 Apr	YouGov/Sunday Times	1,612	**44%**	31%	6%	11%	4%	2%	2%	13
26–28 Apr	ICM/Sun on Sunday	2,012	**47%**	28%	8%	9%	4%	4%	*	19
25–28 Apr	Opinium/Observer	2,007	**47%**	30%	7%	8%	5%	3%	1%	17
26–27 Apr	ORB/Sunday Telegraph	2,093	**42%**	31%	8%	10%	4%	4%		11
25–26 Apr	YouGov/The Times	1,590	**45%**	29%	7%	10%	5%	3%	1%	16
21–25 Apr	Ipsos MORI/Evening Standard	1,004	**49%**	26%	4%	13%	4%	1%	4%	23
21–24 Apr	ICM/The Guardian	2,024	**48%**	27%	7%	10%	4%	3%	1%	21
20–24 Apr	Panelbase	1,026	**49%**	27%	5%	10%	5%	3%	1%	22
20–24 Apr	Kantar Public	1,196	**46%**	24%	8%	11%	5%	4%	1%	22
Pre-23 Apr	Norstat/Sunday Express	1,036	**42%**	26%	8%	10%	*	6%	8%	16
21–22 Apr	Survation/Mail on Sunday	2,072	**40%**	29%	11%	11%	4%	2%	3%	11
20–21 Apr	YouGov/Sunday Times	1,590	**48%**	25%	5%	12%	6%	3%	1%	23
19–21 Apr	ICM/ITV	2,027	**48%**	26%	8%	10%	4%	3%	2%	22
19–20 Apr	ORB/Daily Telegraph	1,860	**44%**	29%	10%	8%	5%	4%		15
19–20 Apr	ComRes/Sunday Mirror	2,074	**50%**	25%	7%	11%	4%	3%	1%	25
19–20 Apr	Opinium/Observer	2,003	**45%**	26%	9%	11%	4%	3%	1%	19
2–20 Apr	YouGov	12,746	**44%**	25%	9%	12%	6%	3%	1%	19
18–19 Apr	YouGov/The Times	1,727	**48%**	24%	7%	12%	6%	2%	1%	24
18 Apr	ICM/The Guardian	1,000	**46%**	25%	8%	11%	4%	4%	1%	21
18 Apr	Prime Minister Theresa May announces her intention to seek a snap general election to be held on 8 June 2017									
14–17 Apr	ICM/The Guardian	2,052	**44%**	26%	11%	10%	4%	4%	1%	18
12–13 Apr	YouGov/The Times	2,069	**44%**	23%	10%	12%	6%	4%	1%	21
11–13 Apr	ComRes/Sunday Mirror, Independent on Sunday	2,026	**46%**	25%	9%	11%	4%	4%	2%	21
11–13 Apr	Opinium/Observer	2,002	**38%**	29%	14%	7%	5%	5%	1%	9
5–6 Apr	YouGov/The Times	1,651	**42%**	25%	11%	11%	8%	3%	1%	17
31 Mar – 2 Apr	ICM/The Guardian	2,005	**43%**	25%	11%	11%	5%	4%	2%	18
26–27 Mar	YouGov/The Times	1,957	**43%**	25%	10%	11%	6%	3%	1%	18
20–21 Mar	YouGov/The Times	1,627	**41%**	25%	12%	11%	6%	3%	2%	16
17–19 Mar	ICM/The Guardian	2,012	**45%**	26%	10%	9%	4%	4%	1%	19
15–17 Mar	ComRes/Sunday Mirror, Independent on Sunday	2,026	**42%**	25%	10%	12%	5%	4%	2%	17
14–17 Mar	Opinium/Observer	2,007	**41%**	28%	13%	8%	6%	3%	1%	13
1–15 Mar	GfK	1,938	**41%**	28%	12%	7%	5%	6%	1%	13%
13–14 Mar	YouGov/The Times	1,631	**44%**	27%	9%	10%	5%	4%	0%	17
10–14 Mar	Ipsos MORI	1,032	**43%**	30%	6%	13%	4%	4%	–	13
8–9 Mar	YouGov/The Times	1,598	**44%**	25%	11%	10%	6%	3%	1%	19
3–5 Mar	ICM/The Guardian	1,787	**44%**	28%	11%	8%	4%	5%	1%	16
2 Mar	Northern Ireland Assembly election									
27–28 Feb	YouGov/The Times	1,666	**42%**	25%	12%	11%	6%	4%	1%	17
23 Feb	Stoke-on-Trent Central by-election (Lab hold) and Copeland by-election (Con gain from Lab)									
21–22 Feb	YouGov/The Times	2,060	**41%**	25%	13%	11%	6%	3%	1%	16
17–19 Feb	ICM/The Guardian	2,028	**44%**	26%	13%	8%	4%	4%	1%	18
14–16 Feb	Opinium/Observer	2,004	**40%**	27%	14%	8%	5%	4%	2%	13
10–14 Feb	Ipsos MORI/Evening Standard	1,014	**40%**	29%	9%	13%	5%	4%	0%	11
12–13 Feb	YouGov/The Times	2,052	**40%**	24%	15%	11%	6%	4%	2%	16
8–10 Feb	ComRes/Sunday Mirror, Independent on Sunday	1,218	**41%**	26%	11%	11%	5%	4%	2%	15
5–6 Feb	YouGov/The Times	1,984	**40%**	24%	14%	11%	6%	4%	1%	16
3–5 Feb	ICM/The Guardian	1,984	**42%**	27%	12%	10%	5%	4%	1%	15
31 Jan – 1 Feb	Opinium/Observer	2,005	**37%**	30%	14%	8%	5%	5%	2%	7
30–31 Jan	YouGov/The Times	1,705	**40%**	26%	12%	11%	6%	4%	1%	14
23–24 Jan	YouGov/The Times	1,643	**40%**	24%	14%	10%	6%	3%	0%	16
20–22 Jan	ICM/The Guardian	2,052	**42%**	26%	13%	10%	4%	5%	1%	16
17–18 Jan	YouGov/The Times	1,654	**42%**	25%	12%	11%	6%	3%	0%	17
13–16 Jan	Ipsos MORI	1,132	**43%**	31%	6%	11%	4%	4%	*	12
13 Jan	Survation/Mail on Sunday	1,177	**38%**	29%	13%	10%	4%	2%	4%	9
10–12 Jan	Opinium/Observer	2,007	**38%**	30%	14%	7%	5%	4%	2%	8
9–10 Jan	YouGov/The Times	1,660	**39%**	28%	13%	11%	6%	3%	1%	11
6–8 Jan	ICM/The Guardian	2,000	**42%**	28%	12%	9%	4%	4%	*	14
3–4 Jan	YouGov/The Times	1,740	**39%**	26%	14%	10%	6%	4%	1%	13

=== 2016 ===
Date(s) conducted	Polling organisation/client	Sample size	Con	Lab	UKIP	LD	SNP	Grn	Others	Lead
18–19 Dec	YouGov/The Times	1,595	**39%**	24%	14%	12%	6%	4%	1%	15
13–16 Dec	Opinium/Observer	2,000	**38%**	31%	13%	6%	6%	4%	1%	7
9–12 Dec	Ipsos MORI	1,003	**40%**	29%	9%	14%	4%	3%	1%	11
9–11 Dec	ICM/The Guardian	2,049	**41%**	27%	14%	9%	4%	3%	1%	14
8 Dec	Sleaford and North Hykeham by-election (Con hold)									
4–5 Dec	YouGov/The Times	1,667	**42%**	25%	12%	11%	6%	4%	1%	17
1 Dec	Richmond Park by-election (LD gain from Con)									
28–29 Nov	YouGov/The Times	1,624	**39%**	27%	14%	9%	6%	4%	1%	12
28 Nov	Paul Nuttall is elected leader of UKIP									
25–27 Nov	ICM/The Guardian	2,009	**44%**	28%	12%	7%	4%	4%	2%	16
21–22 Nov	YouGov/The Times	1,693	**41%**	28%	12%	9%	6%	4%	0%	13
18–20 Nov	ICM/The Guardian	2,031	**42%**	28%	11%	9%	4%	3%	2%	14
15–18 Nov	Opinium	2,005	**41%**	29%	12%	7%	6%	3%	1%	12
14–15 Nov	YouGov/The Times	1,717	**42%**	28%	11%	8%	7%	4%	1%	14
11–14 Nov	Ipsos MORI	1,013	**42%**	33%	7%	10%	5%	3%	1%	9
1–4 Nov	Opinium	2,001	**40%**	32%	13%	6%	6%	4%	–	8
31 Oct – 1 Nov	YouGov/The Times	1,608	**41%**	27%	11%	10%	6%	4%	1%	14
28–30 Oct	ICM/The Guardian	2,040	**43%**	27%	12%	8%	4%	5%	1%	16
24–25 Oct	YouGov/The Times	1,655	**40%**	27%	11%	11%	7%	3%	1%	13
19–24 Oct	BMG	1,546	**42%**	28%	12%	8%	5%	4%	1%	14
20 Oct	Witney by-election (Con hold) and Batley & Spen by-election (Lab hold, unopposed by other major parties)									
19–20 Oct	YouGov/Election Data	1,608	**42%**	26%	12%	8%	6%	5%	1%	16
14–17 Oct	Ipsos MORI	1,016	**47%**	29%	6%	7%	6%	4%	1%	18
11–12 Oct	YouGov/The Times	1,669	**42%**	28%	11%	9%	6%	3%	0%	14
7–9 Oct	ICM/The Guardian	2,017	**43%**	26%	11%	8%	4%	6%	2%	17
28–29 Sep	YouGov/The Times	1,658	**39%**	30%	13%	8%	6%	3%	0%	9
24 Sep	Jeremy Corbyn is re-elected leader of the Labour Party in a leadership challenge									
21–23 Sep	ICM/Sun on Sunday	2,015	**41%**	26%	14%	8%	5%	4%	2%	15
20–23 Sep	BMG	2,026	**39%**	28%	13%	8%	5%	5%	2%	11
19–21 Sep	YouGov/The Times	3,285	**39%**	30%	13%	8%	6%	3%	1%	9
16 Sep	Diane James is elected leader of UKIP									
13–14 Sep	YouGov/The Times	1,732	**38%**	31%	13%	7%	6%	4%	–	7
10–14 Sep	Ipsos MORI/Evening Standard	1,000	**40%**	34%	9%	6%	4%	5%	1%	6
9–11 Sep	ICM/The Guardian	2,013	**41%**	27%	14%	8%	5%	4%	2%	14
4–5 Sep	YouGov/The Times	1,616	**40%**	29%	13%	7%	7%	3%	–	11
2 Sep	Caroline Lucas and Jonathan Bartley are elected joint leaders of the Green Party									
30–31 Aug	YouGov/The Times	1,687	**38%**	30%	14%	7%	6%	4%	–	8
26–28 Aug	ICM/The Guardian	2,040	**41%**	27%	13%	9%	4%	4%	2%	14
22–23 Aug	YouGov/The Times	1,660	**40%**	29%	13%	8%	6%	3%	1%	11
11–22 Aug	Lord Ashcroft Polls	8,011	**40%**	31%	13%	7%	5%	3%	1%	9
16–17 Aug	YouGov/The Times	1,677	**38%**	30%	13%	9%	7%	4%	–	8
13–15 Aug	Ipsos MORI/Evening Standard	1,017	**45%**	34%	6%	7%	4%	4%	1%	11
12–15 Aug	ICM	2,010	**40%**	28%	14%	8%	4%	4%	2%	12
8–9 Aug	YouGov/The Times	1,692	**38%**	31%	13%	8%	7%	4%	–	7
5–8 Aug	TNS	1,199	**39%**	26%	11%	10%	4%	7%	2%	13
1–2 Aug	YouGov/The Times	1,722	**42%**	28%	12%	8%	6%	3%	1%	14
25–26 Jul	YouGov/The Times	1,680	**40%**	28%	13%	8%	7%	4%	1%	12
22–24 Jul	ICM	2,012	**43%**	27%	13%	8%	4%	4%	1%	16
19–22 Jul	Opinium/Observer	2,231	**37%**	31%	15%	6%	6%	4%	1%	6
17–18 Jul	YouGov	1,891	**40%**	29%	12%	9%	7%	3%	1%	11
13–15 Jul	ICM	2,027	**39%**	29%	14%	9%	4%	4%	2%	10
11–13 Jul	Theresa May is elected leader of the Conservative Party and subsequently becomes Prime Minister									
9–11 Jul	Ipsos MORI	1,021	**36%**	35%	8%	11%	5%	4%	1%	1
8–10 Jul	ICM	2,025	**38%**	30%	15%	8%	5%	4%	1%	8
4–5 Jul	Survation/Constitutional Research Council	1,008	**36%**	32%	12%	9%	6%	–	7%	4
1–3 Jul	ICM	1,979	**37%**	30%	15%	8%	5%	4%	2%	7
28–30 Jun	Opinium	2,006	**34%**	29%	17%	7%	5%	4%	2%	5
24–26 Jun	ICM/The Guardian	2,001	**36%**	32%	15%	7%	5%	5%	1%	4
24–25 Jun	Survation/Mail on Sunday	1,033	**32%**	**32%**	16%	9%	4%	4%	2%	Tie
24 Jun	David Cameron announces his resignation as leader of the Conservative Party and Prime Minister, triggering a leadership election									
23 Jun	UK European Union membership referendum: the UK votes to leave the EU by 52% to 48%									
20–22 Jun	Opinium	3,011	**34%**	30%	19%	6%	6%	4%	2%	4
14–17 Jun	Opinium/Observer	2,006	**34%**	30%	18%	6%	6%	4%	1%	4
16 Jun	Murder of Jo Cox MP; referendum campaigning suspended 16–19 June									
16 Jun	Tooting by-election (Lab hold)									
15–16 Jun	ComRes/Sunday Mirror, Independent on Sunday	2,046	**34%**	29%	19%	8%	5%	4%	2%	5
11–14 Jun	Ipsos MORI/Evening Standard	1,257	**35%**	34%	10%	9%	5%	4%	3%	1
10–13 Jun	ICM/The Guardian	2,001	**34%**	30%	19%	8%	4%	4%	1%	4
10–13 Jun	ICM/The Guardian	1,000	**34%**	33%	14%	9%	4%	5%	2%	1
7–10 Jun	Opinium/Observer	2,009	**35%**	32%	18%	4%	5%	4%	1%	3
31 May – 3 Jun	Opinium/Observer	2,007	**34%**	30%	18%	6%	6%	4%	2%	4
27–29 May	ICM/The Guardian	2,052	**36%**	31%	17%	7%	4%	4%	2%	5
27–29 May	ICM/The Guardian	1,004	**36%**	32%	15%	7%	4%	3%	2%	4
17–19 May	Opinium/Observer	2,008	**35%**	30%	18%	5%	6%	5%	2%	5
14–16 May	Ipsos MORI/Evening Standard	1,002	**36%**	34%	10%	8%	5%	5%	2%	2
13–15 May	ICM/The Guardian	1,002	**36%**	34%	13%	7%	4%	4%	2%	2
13–15 May	ICM/The Guardian	2,048	**34%**	32%	17%	7%	5%	4%	1%	2
11–12 May	ComRes/Sunday Mirror, Independent on Sunday	2,043	**36%**	30%	17%	8%	5%	4%	–	6
5 May	Local elections in England; Scottish Parliament election; National Assembly for Wales election; Northern Ireland Assembly election; Ogmore by-election and Sheffield Brightside and Hillsborough by-election (both Lab holds)									
26–29 Apr	Opinium/Observer	2,005	**38%**	30%	15%	5%	5%	5%	2%	8
25–26 Apr	YouGov/The Times	1,650	30%	**33%**	20%	6%	8%	3%	–	3
22–26 Apr	BMG Research	1,375	**33%**	32%	18%	6%	5%	4%	2%	1
16–18 Apr	Ipsos MORI/Evening Standard	1,026	**38%**	35%	11%	6%	6%	3%	1%	3
15–17 Apr	ICM/The Guardian	1,003	**38%**	33%	13%	7%	5%	3%	1%	5
15–17 Apr	ICM/The Guardian	2,008	**36%**	31%	16%	7%	4%	4%	2%	5
13–14 Apr	ComRes/Sunday Mirror, Independent on Sunday	2,036	**35%**	30%	16%	8%	5%	4%	1%	5
11–12 Apr	YouGov/The Times	1,639	31%	**34%**	17%	8%	7%	3%	–	3
29 Mar – 1 Apr	Opinium/Observer	1,966	**33%**	32%	17%	5%	6%	4%	2%	1
24–29 Mar	BMG Research	1,298	**36%**	31%	16%	7%	5%	5%	2%	5
19–22 Mar	Ipsos MORI	1,023	**36%**	34%	11%	10%	5%	3%	2%	2
18–20 Mar	ComRes/Daily Mail	1,002	**37%**	35%	9%	7%	5%	4%	2%	2
16–17 Mar	YouGov/The Times	1,691	33%	**34%**	16%	6%	6%	3%	2%	1
11–13 Mar	ICM/The Guardian	1,001	**36%**	**36%**	11%	8%	3%	3%	1%	Tie
9–10 Mar	ComRes/Sunday Mirror, Independent on Sunday	2,059	**38%**	29%	16%	7%	4%	4%	1%	9
21–23 Feb	YouGov/The Times	3,482	**37%**	30%	16%	8%	6%	3%	–	7
17–23 Feb	BMG Research	1,268	**38%**	30%	16%	5%	5%	5%	2%	8
19–22 Feb	ComRes/Daily Mail	1,000	**38%**	31%	12%	8%	4%	3%	3%	7
13–16 Feb	Ipsos MORI	1,001	**39%**	33%	12%	6%	6%	3%	2%	6
12–14 Feb	ICM/The Guardian	1,004	**39%**	32%	11%	7%	4%	4%	3%	7
10–12 Feb	ComRes/Sunday Mirror, Independent on Sunday	2,018	**41%**	27%	15%	9%	5%	3%	1%	14
3–4 Feb	YouGov/The Times	1,675	**39%**	29%	18%	6%	4%	3%	1%	10
27–28 Jan	YouGov	1,735	**39%**	30%	17%	6%	4%	3%	1%	9
23–25 Jan	Ipsos MORI	1,027	**40%**	31%	11%	7%	5%	4%	1%	9
22–24 Jan	ComRes/Daily Mail	1,006	**37%**	32%	12%	6%	4%	4%	4%	5
15–17 Jan	ICM/The Guardian	1,001	**40%**	35%	10%	6%	4%	3%	2%	5
15–16 Jan	Survation/Mail on Sunday	1,017	**37%**	30%	16%	7%	5%	3%	3%	7
13–15 Jan	ComRes/Sunday Mirror, Independent on Sunday	2,004	**40%**	29%	16%	7%	4%	3%	1%	11
8–14 Jan	Panelbase/Sunday Times	2,087	**39%**	31%	14%	6%	5%	5%	–	8

=== 2015 ===
Date(s) conducted	Polling organisation/client	Sample size	Con	Lab	UKIP	LD	SNP	Green	Others	Lead
18–20 Dec	ICM/The Guardian	1,003	39%	34%	10%	7%	4%	3%	3%	5
17–18 Dec	YouGov/The Times	1,598	39%	29%	17%	6%	5%	3%	1%	10
15–18 Dec	Opinium/Observer	1,936	38%	30%	16%	5%	6%	5%	2%	8
12–14 Dec	Ipsos MORI/Evening Standard	1,040	38%	31%	9%	9%	5%	6%	2%	7
11–13 Dec	ComRes/Daily Mail	1,001	37%	33%	11%	7%	4%	5%	2%	4
9–11 Dec	ComRes/Independent on Sunday, Sunday Mirror	2,049	40%	29%	16%	7%	4%	3%	1%	11
3 Dec	Oldham West and Royton by-election (Lab hold)									
30 Nov – 1 Dec	YouGov/The Times	1,657	41%	30%	16%	6%	4%	3%	1%	11
20–24 Nov	YouGov	4,317	38%	29%	17%	6%	5%	3%	1%	9
20–22 Nov	ComRes/Daily Mail	1,000	40%	29%	11%	8%	4%	3%	4%	11
18–20 Nov	ComRes/Independent on Sunday, Sunday Mirror	2,067	42%	27%	15%	7%	5%	3%	1%	15
16–17 Nov	Survation/Leave.EU (Note: This survey included respondents from Northern Ireland.)	1,546	37%	30%	16%	6%	5%	3%	3%	7
14–17 Nov	Ipsos MORI/Evening Standard	1,021	41%	34%	7%	7%	6%	4%	-	7
11–17 Nov	BMG Research	1,334	37%	30%	15%	7%	4%	4%	2%	7
13–15 Nov	ICM/The Guardian	1,006	39%	33%	12%	7%	5%	3%	1%	6
9–11 Nov	Survation/Leave.EU	2,007	36%	30%	15%	7%	5%	3%	3%	6
22–27 Oct	BMG Research	1,467	37%	31%	15%	6%	4%	5%	2%	6
23–25 Oct	ComRes/Daily Mail	1,002	38%	33%	10%	8%	3%	3%	4%	5
17–19 Oct	Ipsos MORI/Evening Standard	1,021	36%	32%	12%	10%	5%	3%	2%	4
13–16 Oct	Opinium	1,934	37%	32%	15%	5%	6%	4%	2%	5
14–15 Oct	ComRes/Independent on Sunday, Sunday Mirror	2,051	42%	29%	13%	7%	5%	3%	1%	13
9–11 Oct	ICM/The Guardian	1,002	38%	34%	11%	7%	5%	3%	3%	4
29–30 Sep	YouGov/The Sun	2,064	37%	31%	17%	7%	5%	2%	1%	6
26–28 Sep	ComRes/Daily Mail	1,009	39%	30%	12%	9%	4%	4%	3%	9
21–22 Sep	Survation/Huffington Post	1,008	37%	32%	13%	9%	5%	3%	1%	5
19–22 Sep	Ipsos MORI/Evening Standard	1,255	39%	34%	7%	9%	5%	4%	1%	5
17–18 Sep	YouGov/Sunday Times	1,601	39%	31%	16%	6%	5%	3%	1%	8
15–18 Sep	Opinium	1,942	37%	32%	14%	6%	5%	4%	1%	5
16–17 Sep	ComRes/Independent on Sunday, Sunday Mirror	2,015	42%	30%	13%	7%	5%	3%	1%	12
11–13 Sep	ICM/The Guardian	1,006	38%	32%	13%	8%	5%	3%	2%	6
12 Sep	Jeremy Corbyn is elected leader of the Labour Party and appointed Leader of the Opposition									
3–4 Sep	Survation/Mail on Sunday	1,004	38%	32%	13%	6%	5%	4%	2%	6
21–23 Aug	ComRes/Daily Mail	1,001	42%	28%	9%	8%	5%	6%	3%	14
12–13 Aug	ComRes/Independent on Sunday, Sunday Mirror	2,035	40%	29%	13%	8%	5%	4%	1%	11
12–13 Aug	Survation/TSSA	1,007	38%	33%	15%	6%	5%	3%	1%	5
7–9 Aug	ICM/The Guardian	1,000	40%	31%	10%	7%	5%	4%	2%	9
24–26 Jul	ComRes/Daily Mail	1,001	40%	28%	10%	7%	5%	5%	4%	12
18–20 Jul	Ipsos MORI/Evening Standard	1,026	37%	31%	9%	10%	5%	8%	1%	6
16 Jul	Tim Farron is elected leader of the Liberal Democrats									
10–12 Jul	ICM/The Guardian	1,005	38%	34%	13%	6%	4%	4%	1%	4
26–28 Jun	ComRes/Daily Mail	1,002	39%	27%	11%	9%	5%	6%	3%	12
14–16 Jun	Ipsos MORI/Evening Standard	1,005	39%	30%	8%	9%	5%	6%	2%	9
12–14 Jun	ICM/The Guardian	1,004	37%	31%	13%	8%	5%	5%	1%	6
29–31 May	ComRes/Daily Mail	1,000	41%	29%	10%	8%	5%	5%	3%	12
25–26 May	YouGov/The Sun	1,709	41%	30%	13%	7%	4%	4%	1%	11
8–9 May	Survation/Mail on Sunday	1,027	40%	31%	12%	6%	5%	3%	2%	9
7 May 2015	2015 general election (Note: GB results only.)	–	37.8%	31.2%	12.9%	8.1%	4.9%	3.8%	1.4%	6.6

== YouGov model ==
During the election campaign, YouGov created a Multilevel Regression and Post-stratification (MRP) model based on poll data. As set out by YouGov, the model "works by modelling every constituency and key voter types in Britain based on analysis of key demographics as well as past voting behaviour", with new interviews to registered voters conducted every day.

Date(s) conducted	Polling organisation/client	Sample size	Con	Lab	UKIP	LD	SNP	Grn	Others	Lead
8 Jun 2017	2017 general election (Note: GB results only.)	–	43.5%	41.0%	1.9%	7.6%	3.1%	1.7%	1.2%	2.5
31 May – 6 Jun	YouGov	55,707	42%	38%	3%	9%	4%	2%	1%	4
30 May – 5 Jun	YouGov	53,241	42%	38%	4%	9%	4%	2%	1%	4
29 May – 4 Jun	YouGov	53,609	42%	38%	3%	9%	4%	2%	2%	4
27 May – 2 Jun	YouGov	51,945	42%	38%	3%	9%	4%	2%	2%	4
26 May – 1 Jun	YouGov	53,000	42%	38%	3%	9%	4%	2%	1%	4
25–31 May	YouGov	53,611	42%	38%	3%	9%	4%	2%	2%	4
24–30 May	YouGov	53,464	41%	38%	4%	9%	4%	2%	2%	3
23–29 May	YouGov	~50,000	42%	38%	4%	9%	7%			4

== Seat projections ==
The general election was contested under the first-past the post electoral system in 650 constituencies. 326 seats were needed for a parliamentary majority.

Most polls were reported in terms of the overall popular vote share, and the pollsters did not typically project how these shares would equate to numbers of seats in the House of Commons.

=== Final projections from aggregators ===
Various models existed which continually projected election outcomes for the seats in the UK based on the aggregate of polling data. Final predictions of some notable models are tabulated below. 'GB' projections forecast seats in Great Britain only, whilst 'UK' projections also include Northern Irish seats.

Final seat predictions by poll aggregators
Organisation	Area	Con	Lab	SNP	LD	PC	Grn	UKIP	Others	Majority
Election Forecast	GB	371	199	50	7	2	1	1	1	Con 92
Election Calculus	UK	361 (Note: Speaker John Bercow is included in the Conservative total.)	215	45	4	1	0	0	18	Con 72
Lord Ashcroft	UK	357	222	45	4	1	0	0	19	Con 64
Elections Etc.	GB	360	210	48	9	3	1	0	–	Con 70
New Statesman	GB	339	224	57	8	–	–	–	–	Con 28
YouGov	UK	302	269	44	12	2	1	0	20	Hung (Con –24)
Britain Elects	UK	353	219	46	9	3	1	0	19	Con 56
Scenari Politici.com	UK	365	208	49	6	3	1	0	18	Con 84
Forecast UK	UK	344–351	221–230	44–52	5–7	2–4	0–2	0	19	Con 46
Spreadex	GB	365–371	198–204	45.5–47.5	10.5–12.5	–	0.8–1.4	0.1–0.5	–	Con 82

== Exit poll ==
An exit poll, conducted by GfK and Ipsos MORI on behalf of the BBC, ITV and Sky News, was published at the end of voting at 22:00, predicting the number of seats for each party.

Parties	Seats	Change
Conservative Party	314	▼17
Labour Party	266	▲34
Scottish National Party	34	▲22
Liberal Democrats	13	▲13
Plaid Cymru	3	Steady
Green Party	1	Steady
UKIP	0	▼1
Others (Note: This includes the 18 seats in Northern Ireland.)	18	Steady
Hung Parliament (Conservatives 12 seats short of majority)

The exit poll results were regarded as a surprise, as it showed a much closer result than most opinion polls had anticipated.

== Sub-national poll results ==
=== Scotland ===

Date(s) conducted	Polling organisation/client	Sample size	SNP	Lab	Con	LD	UKIP	Grn	Others	Lead
8 Jun 2017	2017 general election	–	36.9%	27.1%	28.6%	6.8%	0.2%	0.2%	0.2%	8.3
7 Jun 2017	Survation/The Daily Record	1,001	39%	29%	26%	6%	*			10
2–7 Jun 2017	Panelbase	1,106	41%	22%	30%	5%	<1%	2%	<1%	11
1–5 Jun 2017	YouGov/The Times	1,093	41%	25%	26%	6%	*	1%	2%	15
31 May – 2 Jun 2017	Survation/The Sunday Post	1,024	40%	25%	27%	6%	2%			13
26–31 May 2017	Panelbase/The Sunday Times	1,021	42%	20%	30%	5%	2%	1%	–	12
22–27 May 2017	Ipsos-Mori/STV	1,016	43%	25%	25%	5%	2%			18
15–18 May 2017	YouGov/The Times	1,032	42%	19%	29%	6%	1%	2%	1%	13
12–18 May 2017	BMG/The Herald	over 1,000	43%	18%	30%	5%	4%			13
4 May 2017	Scottish local elections									
24–27 Apr 2017	YouGov/The Times	1,017	41%	18%	28%	7%	2%	3%	1%	13
18–21 Apr 2017	Panelbase/The Sunday Times	1,029	44%	13%	33%	5%	2%	2%	1%	11
18–21 Apr 2017	Survation/Sunday Post	1,018	43%	18%	28%	9%	3%			15
18 Apr 2017	Prime Minister Theresa May announces her intention to seek a general election to be held on 8 June 2017									
17 Mar 2017	Panelbase/The Sunday Times	1,008	47%	14%	28%	4%	3%	3%	<1%	19
20–26 Jan 2017	Panelbase/The Sunday Times	1,020	47%	15%	27%	4%	3%	3%	<1%	20
28 Sep – 4 Oct 2016	BMG	1,010	49%	17%	20%	8%	2%	3%	-	29
9–15 Sep 2016	Panelbase/The Sunday Times	1,024	47%	16%	24%	5%	4%	3%	-	23
13 Jul 2016	Theresa May becomes the prime minister of the United Kingdom									
23 Jun 2016	UK European Union membership referendum									
5 May 2016	Scottish Parliament election									
7–10 Sep 2015	Survation/Scottish Daily Mail	1,010	52%	21%	16%	6%	2%	3%	-	31
15 Aug 2015	Kezia Dugdale is elected leader of Scottish Labour									
3–7 Jul 2015	Survation/Scottish Daily Mail	1,084	51%	21%	17%	7%	2%	2%	-	30
7 May 2015	2015 general election	–	50.0%	24.3%	14.9%	7.5%	1.6%	1.3%	0.3%	25.7

=== Wales ===

Date(s) conducted	Polling organisation/client	Sample size	Lab	Con	UKIP	PC	LD	Grn	Others	Lead
8 Jun 2017	2017 general election	–	48.9%	33.6%	2.0%	10.4%	4.5%	0.3%	0.2%	15.3
5–7 Jun 2017	YouGov/ITV	1,074	46%	34%	5%	9%	5%	1%		12
29–31 May 2017	YouGov/ITV	1,014	46%	35%	5%	8%	5%	0%	0%	11
18–21 May 2017	YouGov/ITV	1,025	44%	34%	5%	9%	6%	1%	1%	10
5–7 May 2017	YouGov/ITV	1,018	35%	41%	4%	11%	7%	1%	1%	6
4 May 2017	Welsh local elections									
19–21 Apr 2017	YouGov/Welsh Political Barometer	1,029	30%	40%	6%	13%	8%	2%	1%	10
18 Apr 2017	Prime Minister Theresa May announces her intention to seek a general election to be held on 8 June 2017									
3–6 Jan 2017	YouGov/Welsh Political Barometer	1,034	33%	28%	13%	13%	9%	2%	0	5
18–21 Sep 2016	YouGov/Welsh Political Barometer	1,001	35%	29%	14%	13%	7%	2%	0	6
13 Jul 2016	Theresa May becomes the prime minister of the United Kingdom									
30 Jun – 4 Jul 2016	YouGov/Welsh Political Barometer	1,010	34%	23%	16%	16%	8%	1%	2%	11
5 May 2016	Welsh Assembly election and Ogmore by-election									
19–22 Apr 2016	YouGov/Welsh Political Barometer	1,001	37%	23%	17%	13%	7%	2%	1%	14
7–11 Apr 2016	YouGov/ITV Wales	1,011	38%	22%	18%	13%	6%	2%	1%	16
7–18 Mar 2016	Welsh Election Study	3,272	36%	25%	16%	14%	6%	—N/a	3%	11
9–11 Feb 2016	YouGov/Welsh Political Barometer	1,024	37%	27%	18%	13%	4%	1%	-	10
30 Nov – 4 Dec 2015	YouGov/Welsh Political Barometer	1,005	37%	27%	17%	12%	4%	2%	-	10
21–24 Sep 2015	YouGov/Welsh Political Barometer	1,151	42%	26%	16%	10%	5%	2%	-	16
24–26 Jun 2015	YouGov/Welsh Political Barometer	1,151	37%	28%	15%	12%	4%	3%	1%	9
7 May 2015	2015 general election	–	36.9%	27.2%	13.6%	12.1%	6.5%	2.6%	1.0%	9.7

=== Northern Ireland ===
Date(s) conducted	Polling organisation/client	Sample size	DUP	SF	UUP	SDLP	All	TUV	GPNI	Others	Lead
8 Jun 2017	2017 general election	–	36.0%	29.4%	10.3%	11.7%	7.9%	0.4%	0.9%	3.3%	6.6
1–3 Jun 2017	Lucid Talk	3,419	28.9%	28.1%	15.4%	13.8%	9.9%	0.1%	0.6%	3.2%	0.8
17–18 May 2017	Lucid Talk	3,341	28.8%	27.9%	15.7%	13.7%	9.8%	0.1%	0.7%	3.3%	0.9
27–29 Apr 2017	Lucid Talk	3,187	29.4%	27.7%	14.8%	12.4%	10.2%	0.6%	1.8%	3.1%	1.7
2 Mar 2017	Northern Ireland Assembly election										
5 May 2016	Northern Ireland Assembly election										
7 May 2015	2015 general election	–	25.7%	24.5%	16.0%	13.9%	8.6%	2.3%	1.0%	8.2%	1.2

=== English regions ===
==== North East England ====
Date(s) conducted	Polling organisation/client	Sample size	Lab	Con	UKIP	LD	Grn	Others	Lead
8 Jun 2017	2017 general election	–	55.5%	34.4%	3.9%	4.6%	1.3%	0.5%	21.1
24 Apr – 5 May 2017	YouGov	639	42%	40%	8%	6%	2%	0%	2
7 May 2015	2015 general election	–	46.9%	25.3%	16.7%	6.5%	3.6%	0.9%	21.6

==== North West England ====
Date(s) conducted	Polling organisation/client	Sample size	Lab	Con	UKIP	LD	Grn	Others	Lead
8 Jun 2017	2017 general election	–	54.9%	36.2%	1.9%	5.4%	1.1%	0.5%	18.7
24 Apr – 5 May 2017	YouGov	1,537	42%	42%	6%	8%	2%	0%	Tie
23 Feb 2017	Copeland by-election								
3 Dec 2015	Oldham West and Royton by-election								
7 May 2015	2015 general election	–	44.6%	31.2%	13.6%	6.5%	3.2%	0.7%	13.4

==== Yorkshire and the Humber ====
Date(s) conducted	Polling organisation/client	Sample size	Lab	Con	UKIP	LD	Grn	Others	Lead
8 Jun 2017	2017 general election	–	49.0%	40.5%	2.6%	5.0%	1.3%	1.7%	8.5
24 Apr – 5 May 2017	YouGov	1,293	38%	43%	7%	9%	2%	0%	5
20 Oct 2016	Batley and Spen by-election								
5 May 2016	Sheffield Brightside and Hillsborough by-election								
7 May 2015	2015 general election	–	39.1%	32.6%	16.0%	7.1%	3.5%	1.6%	6.5

==== East Midlands ====
Date(s) conducted	Polling organisation/client	Sample size	Con	Lab	UKIP	LD	Grn	Others	Lead
8 Jun 2017	2017 general election	–	50.7%	40.5%	2.4%	4.3%	1.4%	0.6%	10.2
24 Apr – 5 May 2017	YouGov	1,164	54%	28%	7%	8%	2%	0%	26
8 Dec 2016	Sleaford and North Hykeham by-election								
7 May 2015	2015 general election	–	43.5%	31.6%	15.8%	5.6%	3.0%	0.6%	11.9

==== West Midlands ====
Date(s) conducted	Polling organisation/client	Sample size	Con	Lab	UKIP	LD	Grn	Others	Lead
8 Jun 2017	2017 general election	–	49.0%	42.5%	1.8%	4.4%	1.7%	0.6%	6.5
24 Apr – 5 May 2017	YouGov	1,211	51%	28%	9%	9%	2%	0%	23
23 Feb 2017	Stoke-on-Trent Central by-election								
7 May 2015	2015 general election	–	41.8%	32.9%	15.7%	5.5%	3.3%	0.8%	8.9

==== East of England ====
Date(s) conducted	Polling organisation/client	Sample size	Con	Lab	UKIP	LD	Grn	Others	Lead
8 Jun 2017	2017 general election	–	54.6%	32.7%	2.5%	7.9%	1.9%	0.3%	21.9
24 Apr – 5 May 2017	YouGov	1,339	56%	19%	9%	12%	2%	1%	37
7 May 2015	2015 general election	–	49.0%	22.0%	16.2%	8.2%	3.9%	0.5%	27.0

==== London ====
Date(s) conducted	Polling organisation/client	Sample size	Lab	Con	UKIP	LD	Grn	Others	Lead
8 Jun 2017	2017 general election	–	54.5%	33.2%	1.3%	8.8%	1.8%	0.5%	21.3
26–31 May 2017	YouGov	1,000	50%	33%	3%	11%	2%	1%	17
19–23 May 2017	YouGov	1,006	50%	34%	2%	11%	2%	1%	16
22 Apr – 3 May 2017	YouGov	1,040	41%	36%	6%	14%	3%	1%	5
24–28 Mar 2017	YouGov	1,042	37%	34%	9%	14%	5%	1%	3
1 Dec 2016	Richmond Park by-election								
16 Jun 2016	Tooting by-election								
15–19 Apr 2016	YouGov/LBC	1,017	46%	30%	13%	7%	4%	1%	16
4–6 Jan 2016	YouGov/LBC	1,156	44%	37%	11%	4%	2%	2%	7
8 Jun – 12 Aug 2015	YouGov/LBC	3,436	42%	38%	9%	5%	4%	1%	4
7 May 2015	2015 general election	–	43.7%	34.9%	8.1%	7.7%	4.9%	0.8%	8.8

==== South East England ====
Date(s) conducted	Polling organisation/client	Sample size	Con	Lab	UKIP	LD	Grn	Others	Lead
8 Jun 2017	2017 general election	4,635,741	54.6%	28.6%	2.3%	10.5%	3.1%	1.0%	26.0
24 Apr – 5 May 2017	YouGov	2,062	56%	19%	6%	15%	3%	1%	37
20 Oct 2016	Witney by-election								
7 May 2015	2015 general election	4,394,360	50.8%	18.3%	14.7%	9.4%	5.2%	1.5%	32.5

==== South West England ====
Date(s) conducted	Polling organisation/client	Sample size	Con	Lab	LD	UKIP	Grn	Others	Lead
8 Jun 2017	2017 general election	–	51.4%	29.1%	15.0%	1.1%	2.3%	1.2%	22.3
24 Apr – 5 May 2017	YouGov	1,378	52%	22%	16%	6%	3%	1%	30
7 May 2015	2015 general election	–	46.5%	17.7%	15.1%	13.6%	5.9%	1.2%	28.8

== Individual constituency poll results ==
=== Battersea ===
Date(s) conducted	Polling organisation/client	Sample size	Con	Lab	LD	Others	Lead
8 Jun 2017	2017 general election	N/A	41.5%	45.9%	8.0%	4.6%	4.4
9–10 May 2017	Survation/Chris Coghlan	503	46%	38%	13%	5%	8
7 May 2015	2015 general election	N/A	52.4%	36.8%	4.4%	6.4%	15.6

=== Brighton Pavilion ===
Date(s) conducted	Polling organisation/client	Sample size	Grn	Lab	Con	UKIP	LD	Others	Lead
8 Jun 2017	2017 general election	N/A	52.3%	26.8%	19.2%	1.1%	–	0.7%	25.5
27 Apr – 1 May 2017	ICM Unlimited	1,001	47%	23%	25%	3%	2%	0%	22
7 May 2015	2015 general election	–	41.8%	27.3%	22.8%	5.0%	2.8%	0.4%	14.6

=== Edinburgh South ===
Date(s) conducted	Polling organisation/client	Sample size	Lab	SNP	Con	Grn	LD	Others	Lead
8 Jun 2017	2017 general election	–	54.9%	22.5%	19.7%	–	2.9%	–	32.4
3–4 Apr 2017	Survation/Stop Brexit Alliance	530	40%	30%	20%	7%	3%	1%	10
7 May 2015	2015 general election	–	39.1%	33.8%	17.5%	4.2%	3.7%	1.6%	5.3

=== Kensington ===
Date(s) conducted	Polling organisation/client	Sample size	Con	Lab	LD	Grn	UKIP	Others	Lead
8 Jun 2017	2017 general election	–	42.2%	42.2%	12.2%	2.0%	–	1.4%	0.05
25–27 Apr 2017	Survation/Stop Brexit Alliance	522	46%	29%	17%	7%	1%	0%	17
7 May 2015	2015 general election	–	52.3%	31.1%	5.6%	5.1%	4.5%	1.5%	21.2

=== Tatton ===
Date(s) conducted	Polling organisation/client	Sample size	Con	Lab	UKIP	LD	Others	Lead
8 Jun 2017	2017 general election	–	58.6%	28.5%	–	9.0%	4.0%	30.1
22 Mar 2017	Survation/38 Degrees	507	58%	17%	9%	12%	4%	41
7 May 2015	2015 general election	–	58.6%	18.3%	10.8%	8.5%	3.8%	40.3

== Preferred prime minister polling ==
Some opinion pollsters have asked voters which party leader they would prefer as Prime Minister – Theresa May (Conservative Party) or Jeremy Corbyn (Labour Party). The questions differ slightly from pollster to pollster:

- Opinium, Lord Ashcroft and YouGov: "Which of the following do you think would make the best Prime Minister?"
- Kantar Public: "If you had to choose between Theresa May and Jeremy Corbyn, who do you think would make the best leader for Britain?"
- Ipsos MORI: "Who do you think would make the most capable Prime Minister, the Conservative’s [sic] Theresa May, or Labour’s Jeremy Corbyn?"
- Survation: "Which of the following party leaders do you think would make the best Prime Minister?"
- ComRes: "For each of these pairs of statements, which one comes closest to your view? - Jeremy Corbyn would make a better Prime Minister than Theresa May/Theresa May would make a better Prime Minister than Jeremy Corbyn"
- ICM: "Putting aside which party you support, and only thinking about your impression of them as leaders, which one of the following do you think would make the best Prime Minister for Britain?"

=== May vs Corbyn ===
==== 2017 ====
Date(s) conducted	Polling organisation/client	Sample size	Theresa May	Jeremy Corbyn	None of these	Not sure	Lead
5-7 Jun	ComRes	2,051	48%	39%	—N/a	14%	9
4–6 Jun	Opinium	3,002	42%	29%	19%	10%	13
2–3 Jun	Survation	1,103	50%	36%	—N/a	15%	14
31 May–2 Jun	ComRes	2,038	49%	34%	—N/a	17%	15
30 May–1 Jun	Ipsos MORI	1,046	50%	35%	6%	8%	15
30–31 May	Opinium	2,006	42%	26%	21%	12%	16
30–31 May	YouGov/The Times	1,875	43%	30%	—N/a	27%	13
25–30 May	Kantar Public	1,199	38%	23%	23%	15%	15
26–27 May	Survation/Good Morning Britain	1,009	53%	30%	—N/a	17%	23%
24–26 May	ICM/The Sun on Sunday	2,044	48%	27%	—N/a	25%	21%
24–26 May	ComRes	2,024	51%	30%	—N/a	19%	21%
24–25 May	YouGov/The Times	2,052	45%	28%	—N/a	27%	17
23–24 May	Opinium	2,002	43%	26%	21%	11%	17
18–22 May	Kantar Public	1,200	38%	24%	23%	14%	14
16–17 May	YouGov/The Times	1,861	46%	23%	—N/a	31%	23%
16–17 May	Opinium	2,003	45%	22%	21%	12%	23%
15–17 May	Ipsos MORI	1,053	56%	29%	8%	6%	27%
11–15 May	Kantar Public	1,201	41%	18%	22%	19%	23%
12–13 May	Survation	1,016	58%	24%	—N/a	19%	34%
9–12 May	Opinium	2,003	45%	19%	24%	12%	26%
9-10 May	YouGov/The Times	1,651	49%	21%	—N/a	30%	28%
4–8 May	Kantar Public	1,201	40%	17%	24%	19%	23%
5–6 May	Survation	1,005	60%	21%	—N/a	19%	39%
2-3 May	Opinium	2,005	46%	18%	25%	11%	28%
2-3 May	YouGov/The Times	2,066	49%	21%	—N/a	29%	28%
20–24 Apr	Kantar Public	2,003	43%	17%	20%	20%	26%
25–28 Apr	Opinium/The Observer	2,007	44%	19%	25%	12%	25%
25–26 Apr	YouGov/The Times	1,590	48%	18%	—N/a	33%	30%
21–25 Apr	Ipsos MORI	1,004	61%	23%	6%	7%	38%
20–24 Apr	Kantar Public	2,003	44%	18%	23%	16%	26%
19–20 Apr	Opinium/Observer	2,003	49%	14%	26%	11%	35%
18–19 Apr	YouGov/The Times	1,727	54%	15%	—N/a	31%	39%
18 Apr	Prime Minister Theresa May announces her intention to seek a general election						
12–13 Apr	YouGov/The Times	2,069	50%	14%	—N/a	36%	36%
11–13 Apr	Opinium/Observer	1,651	47%	14%	28%	11%	33%
5–6 Apr	YouGov/The Times	1,651	49%	16%	—N/a	35%	33%
21–28 Mar	Lord Ashcroft Polls	10,153	55%	18%	—N/a	27%	37%
26–27 Mar	YouGov/The Times	1,957	51%	13%	—N/a	36%	38%
20–21 Mar	YouGov/The Times	1,627	47%	14%	—N/a	39%	33%
14–17 Mar	Opinium/Observer	2,007	45%	14%	29%	12%	31%
13–14 Mar	YouGov/The Times	1,631	48%	14%	—N/a	38%	34%
27–28 Feb	YouGov/The Times	1,666	49%	15%	—N/a	36%	34%
21–22 Feb	YouGov/The Times	2,060	49%	15%	—N/a	36%	34%
14–16 Feb	Opinium/Observer	2,004	46%	13%	29%	12%	33%
12–13 Feb	YouGov/The Times	2,052	49%	15%	—N/a	36%	34%
31 Jan–1 Feb	Opinium/Observer	2,005	43%	14%	29%	14%	29%
30–31 Jan	YouGov/The Times	1,705	48%	16%	—N/a	36%	32%
23–24 Jan	YouGov/The Times	1,643	47%	15%	—N/a	38%	32%
10–12 Jan	Opinium/Observer	2,007	40%	16%	28%	15%	24%
9–10 Jan	YouGov/The Times	1,660	45%	17%	—N/a	38%	28%
3–4 Jan	YouGov/The Times	1,740	47%	14%	—N/a	39%	33%

==== 2016 ====
Date(s) conducted	Polling organisation/client	Sample size	Theresa May	Jeremy Corbyn	None of these	Not sure	Lead
18–19 Dec	YouGov/The Times	1,595	44%	16%	—N/a	41%	28%
13–16 Dec	Opinium/The Observer	2,000	42%	16%	28%	13%	26%
4–5 Dec	YouGov/The Times	1,667	49%	16%	—N/a	35%	33%
28–29 Nov	YouGov/The Times	1,624	45%	18%	—N/a	37%	27%
15–18 Nov	Opinium/The Observer	2,005	45%	17%	25%	13%	28%
14–15 Nov	YouGov/The Times	1,717	48%	18%	—N/a	34%	30%
1–4 Nov	Opinium/The Observer	2,001	45%	16%	25%	13%	29%
31 Oct-1 Nov	YouGov/The Times	1,655	47%	17%	—N/a	36%	30%
24–25 Oct	YouGov/The Times	1,655	48%	16%	—N/a	36%	32%
11–12 Oct	YouGov/The Times	1,669	51%	18%	—N/a	31%	33%
13–14 Sep	YouGov/The Times	1,732	50%	18%	—N/a	33%	32%
30–31 Aug	YouGov/The Times	1,687	52%	21%	—N/a	27%	31%
22–23 Aug	YouGov/The Times	1,660	50%	19%	—N/a	30%	31%
16–17 Aug	YouGov/The Times	1,677	51%	19%	—N/a	30%	32%
8–9 Aug	YouGov/The Times	1,692	52%	18%	—N/a	29%	34%
1–2 Aug	YouGov/The Times	1,722	52%	18%	—N/a	30%	34%
25–26 Jul	YouGov/The Times	1,680	52%	18%	—N/a	30%	34%
13 Jul	Theresa May becomes the prime minister of the United Kingdom						
23 Jun	The UK votes to leave the EU; David Cameron announces he will resign as prime minister						
5 May	UK elections, 2016 including the Ogmore and Sheffield Brightside & Hillsborough by-elections						
11–12 Apr	YouGov/The Times	1,693	23%	30%	—N/a	46%	7

=== Cameron vs Corbyn ===
==== 2016 ====
Date(s) conducted	Polling organisation/client	Sample size	David Cameron	Jeremy Corbyn	None of these	Not sure	Lead
11–12 Apr	YouGov/The Times	1,693	32%	25%	—N/a	42%	7

==== 2015 ====
Date(s) conducted	Polling organisation/client	Sample size	David Cameron	Jeremy Corbyn	None of these	Not sure	Lead
18–19 Dec	YouGov/The Times	1,595	49%	23%	—N/a	29%	28%
13–16 Dec	Opinium/The Observer	2,000	42%	16%	28%	13%	26%
25–28 Sep	ComRes	2,024	54%	30%	—N/a	16%	24%

=== Multiple party leaders ===
Some polls ask voters to choose between multiple party leaders. The questions vary by pollster:

- Lord Ashcroft: "Which of the following do you think would make the best Prime Minister?"
- ComRes: "Who of the following would make the best Prime Minister after the upcoming General Election?"
- YouGov: "Which of the following do you think would make the best Prime Minister?"

==== 2017 ====
Date(s) conducted	Polling organisation/client	Sample size	Theresa May	Jeremy Corbyn	Tim Farron	Paul Nuttall	Don't Know	Lead
27 April–1 May	Lord Ashcroft Polls	40,329	64%	25%	11%	—N/a	—N/a	39%
27–28 Apr	YouGov/Sunday Times	1,612	45%	16%	6%	2%	32%	29%
20–21 Apr	YouGov/Sunday Times	1,590	46%	12%	6%	1%	35%	34%
19–20 Apr	ComRes/Sunday Mirror	2,074	62%	25%	10%	4%	—N/a	37%

==== 2016 ====
Date(s) conducted	Polling organisation/client	Sample size	Theresa May	Jeremy Corbyn	Tim Farron	Lead
11–22 Aug	Lord Ashcroft Polls	8,001	67%	25%	8%	42%

=== Hypothetical polling ===
Hypothetical polling

Date(s) conducted	Polling organisation/client	Sample size	Boris Johnson	Jeremy Corbyn	Don't Know	Lead
11–12 Apr 2016	YouGov/The Times	1,693	34%	29%	36%	5
17–18 Dec 2015	YouGov/The Times	1,598	43%	29%	28%	14

Date(s) conducted	Polling organisation/client	Sample size	George Osborne	Jeremy Corbyn	Don't Know	Lead
11–12 Apr 2016	YouGov/The Times	1,693	21%	34%	45%	13
17–18 Dec 2015	YouGov/The Times	1,598	39%	27%	34%	12

== See also ==
- List of United Kingdom by-elections (2010–present)
- Opinion polling for the 2015 United Kingdom general election
- Opinion polling on the United Kingdom's membership of the European Union (2016–present)
