= Matt Singh =

British polling/election analyst)

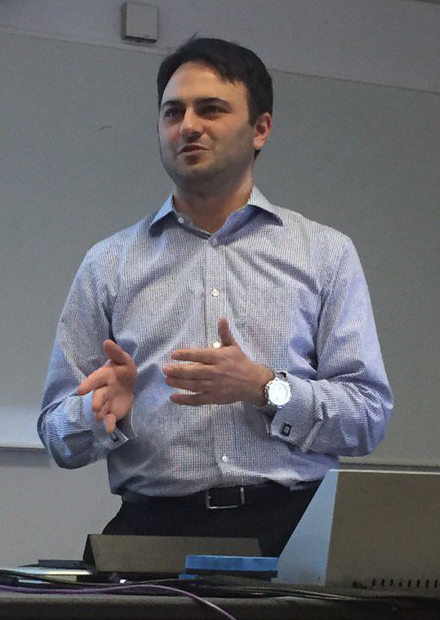
- Singh in 2016

Matt Singh is an election and opinion polling analyst and was founder of the website and polling company Number Cruncher Politics, based in London. Singh rose to prominence in mid-2015 for his analysis which correctly predicted the opinion polling failure and Conservative victory at the 2015 UK general election.

As well as accurately forecasting the result of the 2015 UK election, Singh also provided commentary on the Labour Party leadership contest in August 2015, dismissing suggestions that polls were overstating support for eventual winner Jeremy Corbyn and suggesting that they could even be understating it. In the event, Corbyn polled 59.5% of the vote, compared with the final YouGov poll of 57%.

At the 2017 UK election Singh was unable to repeat his success of 2015, suggesting in his Financial Times series The Election Analyst that the polls were again underestimating the Conservatives and that the party was likely to increase its majority. He acknowledged this "proved some way off the mark", as the Conservatives lost seats overall and the election resulted in a hung parliament.

In 2018, Singh and Number Cruncher began conducting their own polling on voter intention and UK public opinion. Number Cruncher Politics was commissioned to undertake polling for a range of organisations, including on race relations for ITV's current affairs show Peston, on internationalism for the campaign group Best for Britain, and on racism in Wales for ITV Cymru Wales.

In his time as a commentator Singh wrote for Bloomberg View, The Times, the New Statesman, and the Huffington Post.

== Banking career ==
Singh started work for Barclays Capital as an interest rate trader in 2005. He originally worked in UK Gilt trading and later Scandinavian interest rate swaps. He was noted for his instinct in trading against news events.
