= Copeland (constituency) =

UK Parliament constituency (1983–2024)

Coordinates: 54.431°N 3.389°W

- Former county constituency for the House of Commons
- Boundary of Copeland in Cumbria

- Location of Cumbria within England
- County: Cumbria
- Electorate: 63,696 (December 2010)
- Major settlements: Whitehaven

1983–2024
- Seats: One
- Created from: Whitehaven

Copeland was a constituency in Cumbria created in 1983 and represented in the House of Commons of the UK Parliament. (Note: A county constituency (for the purposes of election expenses and type of returning officer)) (Note: As with all constituencies, the constituency elects one Member of Parliament (MP) by the first past the post system of election at least every five years.) The constituency was represented in Parliament by Trudy Harrison, of the Conservative Party, from a by-election in February 2017 until its abolition for the 2024 general election. The seat had been held by Labour candidates at elections between 1983 and 2015 inclusive.

Copeland was one of five Cumbria seats won (held or gained) by a Conservative candidate in 2019 out of a total of six covering the county.

The bulk of the seat was in the Lake District, together with a large proportion of its population.

Further to the completion of the 2023 Periodic Review of Westminster constituencies, the seat was abolished, with the majority being included in a new constituency which also includes the town of Workington, and is named Whitehaven and Workington – first contested at the 2024 general election. Keswick was included in the new constituency of Penrith and Solway, and Millom was transferred to Barrow and Furness.

== History ==
Copeland was created for the 1983 general election as the sole forerunner to the constituency of Whitehaven, renamed for the Borough of Copeland which had been created by the 1974 local government reorganisation. In 1983 the seat was won for Labour by Jack Cunningham, who had previously been the member for Whitehaven. It consistently returned Labour Party candidates until the by-election of 23 February 2017, when Trudy Harrison gained it for the Conservatives. Prior to that (save for the landslide in 1931 when part of the parliamentary Labour Party remained in government with the Conservative Party under Ramsay MacDonald), the last Conservative elected for the area was in 1924.

The 2015 result gave the seat the 31st most marginal majority of Labour's 232 seats by percentage of majority.

== Boundaries ==
Map of boundaries 2010-2024

=== 1983–2010 ===
Following the renaming of the Whitehaven constituency as Copeland, its boundaries remained unchanged, being coterminous with the local government district of Copeland.

=== 2010-2024 ===
Parliament accepted the Boundary Commission's Fifth Periodic Review of Westminster constituencies by making changes to this constituency for the 2010 general election, namely the addition of the wards Crummock, Dalton, Derwent Valley and Keswick in the Allerdale District.

The four new wards thus extended the constituency beyond the district of Copeland. They included the town of Keswick, which had a larger electorate than the other three new and sparsely populated wards, despite their extensive area. The new wards were in the Lake District, like much of Copeland district. The inclusion of Keswick in the constituency was the main topic in public consultations regarding the changes.

== Members of Parliament ==
Election	Member	Party
1983	Jack Cunningham	Labour
2005	Jamie Reed	Labour
2017 by-election	Trudy Harrison	Conservative
2024	Constituency abolished	

== Elections ==
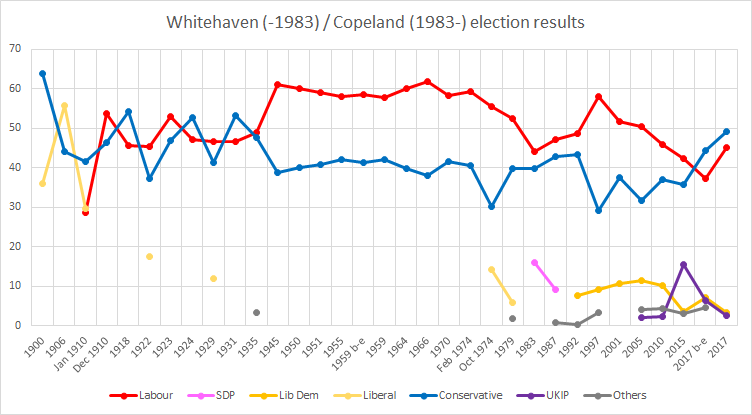
Copeland election results

=== Elections in the 2010s ===
General election 2019: Copeland
Party	Candidate	Votes	%	±%
Conservative	Trudy Harrison	22,856	53.7	+4.6
Labour	Tony Lywood	17,014	40.0	−5.1
Liberal Democrats	John Studholme	1,888	4.4	+1.1
Green	Jack Lenox	765	1.8	New
Majority		5,842	13.7	+9.7
Turnout		42,523	68.9	−1.3
Conservative hold		Swing	+4.9	

General election 2017: Copeland
Party	Candidate	Votes	%	±%
Conservative	Trudy Harrison	21,062	49.1	+13.3
Labour	Gillian Troughton	19,367	45.1	+2.8
Liberal Democrats	Rebecca Hanson	1,404	3.3	−0.2
UKIP	Herbie Crossman	1,094	2.5	−13.0
Majority		1,695	4.0	N/A
Turnout		42,927	70.2	+6.4
Conservative hold		Swing	+5.3	

By-election 2017: Copeland
Party	Candidate	Votes	%	±%
Conservative	Trudy Harrison	13,748	44.3	+8.5
Labour	Gillian Troughton	11,601	37.3	−5.0
Liberal Democrats	Rebecca Hanson	2,252	7.2	+3.7
UKIP	Fiona Mills	2,025	6.5	−9.0
Independent	Michael Guest	811	2.6	New
Green	Jack Lenox	515	1.7	−1.3
Independent	Roy Ivinson	116	0.4	New
Majority		2,147	7.0	N/A
Turnout		31,889	51.3	−12.5
Conservative gain from Labour		Swing	+6.7	

General election 2015: Copeland
Party	Candidate	Votes	%	±%
Labour	Jamie Reed	16,750	42.3	−3.7
Conservative	Stephen Haraldsen	14,186	35.8	−1.3
UKIP	Michael Pye	6,148	15.5	+13.2
Liberal Democrats	Danny Gallagher	1,368	3.5	−6.7
Green	Allan Todd	1,179	3.0	+2.1
Majority		2,564	6.5	−2.4
Turnout		39,631	63.8	−3.8
Labour hold		Swing	−1.2	

General election 2010: Copeland
Party	Candidate	Votes	%	±%
Labour	Jamie Reed	19,699	46.0	−4.5
Conservative	Chris Whiteside	15,866	37.1	+5.4
Liberal Democrats	Frank Hollowell	4,365	10.2	−1.3
BNP	Clive Jefferson	1,474	3.4	New
UKIP	Edward Caley-Knowles	994	2.3	+0.1
Green	Jill Perry	389	0.9	New
Majority		3,833	8.9	−9.9
Turnout		42,787	67.6	+5.4
Labour hold		Swing	−4.9	

=== Elections in the 2000s ===
General election 2005: Copeland
Party	Candidate	Votes	%	±%
Labour	Jamie Reed	17,033	50.5	−1.3
Conservative	Chris Whiteside	10,713	31.7	−5.8
Liberal Democrats	Frank Hollowell	3,880	11.5	+0.8
UKIP	Edward Caley-Knowles	735	2.2	New
Independent	Brian Earley	734	2.2	New
English Democrat	Alan Mossop	662	2.0	New
Majority		6,320	18.8	+4.5
Turnout		33,757	62.3	−2.6
Labour hold		Swing	+2.3	

General election 2001: Copeland
Party	Candidate	Votes	%	±%
Labour	Jack Cunningham	17,991	51.8	−6.4
Conservative	Mike Graham	13,027	37.5	+8.3
Liberal Democrats	Mark Gayler	3,732	10.7	+1.5
Majority		4,964	14.3	−14.7
Turnout		34,750	64.9	−11.4
Labour hold		Swing	−7.4	

=== Elections in the 1990s ===
General election 1997: Copeland
Party	Candidate	Votes	%	±%
Labour	Jack Cunningham	24,077	58.2	+9.5
Conservative	Andrew Cumpsty	12,081	29.2	−14.2
Liberal Democrats	Roger Putnam	3,814	9.2	+1.6
Referendum	Chris Johnston	1,036	2.5	New
ProLife Alliance	Gerard Hanratty	389	0.9	New
Majority		11,996	29.0	+23.7
Turnout		41,397	76.3	−7.2
Labour hold		Swing	+11.9	

General election 1992: Copeland
Party	Candidate	Votes	%	±%
Labour	Jack Cunningham	22,328	48.7	+1.5
Conservative	Philip Davies	19,889	43.4	+0.4
Liberal Democrats	Roger Putnam	3,508	7.6	−1.5
Natural Law	James Sinton	148	0.3	New
Majority		2,439	5.3	+1.1
Turnout		45,873	83.5	+2.2
Labour hold		Swing	+0.5	

=== Elections in the 1980s ===
General election 1987: Copeland
Party	Candidate	Votes	%	±%
Labour	Jack Cunningham	20,999	47.2	+3.0
Conservative	Ashton Toft	19,105	43.0	+3.1
SDP	Edward Colgan	4,052	9.1	−6.8
Green	Robert Gibson	319	0.7	New
Majority		1,894	4.2	−0.1
Turnout		44,475	81.3	+3.1
Labour hold		Swing		

General election 1983: Copeland
Party	Candidate	Votes	%	±%
Labour	Jack Cunningham	18,756	44.2	−8.2
Conservative	Veronica Wilson	16,919	39.9	+0.1
SDP	John Beasley	6,722	15.9	+9.9
Majority		1,837	4.3	−8.3
Turnout		42,397	78.2	
Labour win (new seat)				

== See also ==
- List of parliamentary constituencies in Cumbria
