= Number Cruncher Politics =

Number Cruncher Politics is a political analysis and polling consultancy and website launched in 2014. The site is non-partisan and focused on UK opinion polling, psephology, and statistical analysis. It became known for correctly predicting the polling failure at the 2015 general election.

== History ==
On the eve the 2015 UK election, the site published a lengthy analysis of opinion polling accuracy by its founder Matt Singh, based on decades of polling and election data. The report suggested that, contrary to the close race suggested by opinion polls and forecasts, the Conservative Party would win by more than six percentage points and could win an overall majority. In the event, the Conservative lead in the popular vote was 6.6 points, giving the party an overall majority of 12 seats. After the publication of the broadcasters' exit poll, the post containing the analysis attracted sufficient traffic to crash the website.

At the Scottish independence referendum, the site was credited by FiveThirtyEight with the most accurate regional prediction.

Prior to the United Kingdom general election, 2017, Number Cruncher Politics published an analysis by Singh suggesting that "based on historical accuracy, leader ratings and local election results, the likeliest outcome as of now is a Conservative popular vote margin in the mid-teens". Singh later acknowledged this "proved some way off the mark", as the Conservatives' lead was ultimately just 2.3% and the election resulted in a hung Parliament.
