= List of United Kingdom Liberal Democrat MPs (2015–2017) =

Eight Liberal Democrat members of Parliament (MPs) were elected to the House of Commons of the United Kingdom at the 2015 general election. Another seat was won in the 2016 Richmond Park by-election.

== MPs ==
Roles	Name	Age	First elected	Constituency	Majority	State party	Regional party
Foreign Affairs spokesperson and Chief Whip	Tom Brake	64	1997	Carshalton and Wallington	1,510	English	London Liberal Democrats
Home Affairs spokesperson	Alistair Carmichael	60	2001	Orkney and Shetland	817	Scottish	Scottish Liberal Democrats
Brexit and International Trade spokesperson	Nick Clegg	59	2005	Sheffield Hallam	2,353	English	Yorkshire and the Humber Liberal Democrats
Leader	Tim Farron	56	2005	Westmorland and Lonsdale	8,949	English	North West Liberal Democrats
Health spokesperson	Norman Lamb	68	2001	North Norfolk	4,043	English	East of England Liberal Democrats
Campaigns Chair	Greg Mulholland	55	2005	Leeds North West	2,907	English	Yorkshire and the Humber Liberal Democrats
None	Sarah Olney	40	2016	Richmond Park	1,872	English	London Liberal Democrats
Education spokesperson	John Pugh	77	2001	Southport	1,322	English	North West Liberal Democrats
Wales spokesperson	Mark Williams	60	2005	Ceredigion	3,067	Welsh	Welsh Liberal Democrats

== See also ==
- List of MPs elected in the 2015 United Kingdom general election
- List of MPs for constituencies in England 2015–17
- List of MPs for constituencies in Northern Ireland 2015–17
- List of MPs for constituencies in Scotland 2015–17
- List of MPs for constituencies in Wales 2015–17
- Category:UK MPs 2015–2017
