= List of MPs for constituencies in the East Midlands region 2015–2017 =

This is a list of members of Parliament (MPs) elected to the House of Commons of the United Kingdom in the East Midlands region by constituencies for the Fifty-Sixth Parliament of the United Kingdom (2015 to 2017).

It includes both MPs elected at the 2015 general election, held on 7 May 2015, and those subsequently elected in by-elections.

== Current composition ==
Affiliation	Members
Conservative Party	30
Labour Party	16
Total	46

== MPs ==
MP	Constituency	Party	In constituency since
Graham Allen	Nottingham North	Labour Party	1987
Jon Ashworth	Leicester South	Labour Party	2011 by-election
Margaret Beckett	Derby South	Labour Party	1983
Andrew Bingham	High Peak	Conservative Party	2010
David Mackintosh	Northampton South	Conservative Party	2015
Nicholas Boles	Grantham and Stamford	Conservative Party	2010
Peter Bone	Wellingborough	Conservative Party	2005
Andrew Bridgen	North West Leicestershire	Conservative Party	2010
Kenneth Clarke	Rushcliffe	Conservative Party	1970
Vernon Coaker	Gedling	Labour Party	1997
Gloria De Piero	Ashfield	Labour Party	2010
Ed Argar	Charnwood	Conservative Party	2015
Alan Duncan	Rutland and Melton	Conservative Party	1992
Michael Ellis	Northampton North	Conservative Party	2010
Natascha Engel	North East Derbyshire	Labour Party	2005
Neil O'Brien	Harborough	Conservative Party	2017
Lilian Greenwood	Nottingham South	Labour Party	2010
John Hayes	South Holland and The Deepings	Conservative Party	1997
Chris Heaton-Harris	Daventry	Conservative Party	2010
Philip Hollobone	Kettering	Conservative Party	2010
Robert Jenrick	Newark	Conservative Party	2014 by-election
Liz Kendall	Leicester West	Labour Party	2010
Pauline Latham	Mid Derbyshire	Conservative Party	2010
Andrea Leadsom	South Northamptonshire	Conservative Party	2010
Maggie Throup	Erewash	Conservative Party	2010
Edward Leigh	Gainsborough	Conservative Party	1983
Chris Leslie	Nottingham East	Labour Party	2010
John Mann	Bassetlaw	Labour Party	2001
Karl McCartney	Lincoln	Conservative Party	2010
Patrick McLoughlin	Derbyshire Dales	Conservative Party	2010
Alan Meale	Mansfield	Labour Party	1987
Nigel Mills	Amber Valley	Conservative Party	2010
Nicky Morgan	Loughborough	Conservative Party	2010
Toby Perkins	Chesterfield	Labour Party	2010
Stephen Phillips	Sleaford and North Hykeham	Conservative Party	2010
Alberto Costa	South Leicestershire	Conservative Party	2015
Tom Pursglove	Corby	Conservative Party	2015
Matt Warman	Boston and Skegness	Conservative Party	2001
Dennis Skinner	Bolsover	Labour Party	1970
Anna Soubry	Broxtowe	Conservative Party	2010
Mark Spencer	Sherwood	Conservative Party	2010
Peter Tapsell	Louth and Horncastle	Conservative Party	1997
David Tredinnick	Bosworth	Conservative Party	1987
Keith Vaz	Leicester East	Labour Party	1987
Heather Wheeler	South Derbyshire	Conservative Party	2010
Amanda Solloway	Derby North	Labour Party	2015

== By-elections ==
- 2016 Sleaford and North Hykeham by-election

== See also ==
- 2015 United Kingdom general election
- List of MPs elected in the 2015 United Kingdom general election
- List of MPs for constituencies in England 2015–2017
- Category:UK MPs 2015–2017
