= List of MPs for constituencies in Northern Ireland (2015–2017) =

- May 7, 2015
- Colours on map indicate the party allegiance of each constituency's MP.

This is a list of members of Parliament (MPs) elected to the House of Commons of the United Kingdom by Northern Irish constituencies for the 56th Parliament of the United Kingdom (2015 to 2017). There are 18 such constituencies, 11 of which are represented by Unionists and seven by Nationalists. It includes both MPs elected at the 2015 general election, held on 7 May 2015, and those subsequently elected in by-elections.

The list is sorted by the name of the MP, and MPs who did not serve throughout the Parliament are italicised. New MPs elected since the general election are noted at the bottom of the page.

Sinn Féin MPs follow an abstentionist policy of not taking their seats in the House of Commons.

== Current composition ==
Affiliation	Members
Democratic Unionist	8
Sinn Féin	4
SDLP	3
Ulster Unionist	2
Independent Unionist	1
Total	18

== MPs ==
MP	Constituency	Party	In constituency since
Gregory Campbell	East Londonderry	Democratic Unionist	2001
Nigel Dodds	Belfast North	Democratic Unionist	2001
Pat Doherty	West Tyrone	Sinn Féin	2001
Jeffrey Donaldson	Lagan Valley	Democratic Unionist	1997
Mark Durkan	Foyle	SDLP	2005
Tom Elliott	Fermanagh and South Tyrone	Ulster Unionist	2015
Sylvia Hermon	North Down	Independent Unionist	2001
Gavin Robinson	Belfast East	Democratic Unionist	2015
Danny Kinahan	South Antrim	Ulster Unionist	2015
Alasdair McDonnell	Belfast South	SDLP	2005
Francie Molloy	Mid Ulster	Sinn Féin	2013 by-election
Paul Maskey	Belfast West	Sinn Féin	2011 by-election
Mickey Brady	Newry and Armagh	Sinn Féin	2015
Ian Paisley Jr	North Antrim	Democratic Unionist	2010
Margaret Ritchie	South Down	SDLP	2010
Jim Shannon	Strangford	Democratic Unionist	2010
David Simpson	Upper Bann	Democratic Unionist	2005
Sammy Wilson	East Antrim	Democratic Unionist	2005

== See also ==
- 2015 United Kingdom general election
- List of MPs elected in the 2015 United Kingdom general election
- List of MPs for constituencies in England 2015–17
- List of MPs for constituencies in Scotland 2015–17
- List of MPs for constituencies in Wales 2015–17
- Category:UK MPs 2015–2017
