= List of MPs for constituencies in Wales (2015–2017) =

- Colours on map indicate the party allegiance of each constituency's MP.

This is a list of members of Parliament (MPs) elected to the House of Commons of the United Kingdom by Welsh constituencies for the Fifty-Sixth Parliament of the United Kingdom (2015 to 2017).

It includes both MPs elected at the 2015 general election, held on 7 May 2015, and those subsequently elected in by-elections.

The list is sorted by the name of the MP, and MPs who did not serve throughout the Parliament are italicised. New MPs elected since the general election are noted at the bottom of the page.

== Composition ==
Affiliation	MembersMembers
Welsh Labour Party	25
Welsh Conservative Party	11
Plaid Cymru	3
Welsh Liberal Democrats	1
Total	40

== MPs ==
MP	Constituency	Party	In constituency since
Guto Bebb	Aberconwy	Conservative Party	2010
Kevin Brennan	Cardiff West	Labour Party	2001
Chris Bryant	Rhondda	Labour Party	2001
Alun Cairns	Vale of Glamorgan	Conservative Party	2010
Ann Clwyd	Cynon Valley	Labour Party	1984 by-election
Stephen Crabb	Preseli Pembrokeshire	Conservative Party	2005
Wayne David	Caerphilly	Labour Party	2001
Byron Davies	Gower	Conservative Party	2015
Christopher Davies	Brecon and Radnorshire	Conservative Party	2015
David Davies	Monmouth	Conservative Party	2005
Geraint Davies	Swansea West	Labour/Co-operative	2010
Glyn Davies	Montgomeryshire	Conservative Party	2010
James Davies	Vale of Clwyd	Conservative Party	2015
Stephen Doughty	Cardiff South and Penarth	Labour/Co-operative	2012 by-election
Jonathan Edwards	Carmarthen East and Dinefwr	Plaid Cymru	2010
Chris Evans	Islwyn	Labour/Co-operative	2010
Paul Flynn	Newport West	Labour Party	1987
Stephen Kinnock	Aberavon	Labour Party	2015
Nia Griffith	Llanelli	Labour Party	2005
Christina Rees	Neath	Labour Party	2015
David Hanson	Delyn	Labour Party	1992
Simon Hart	Carmarthen West and South Pembrokeshire	Conservative Party	2010
Gerald Jones	Merthyr Tydfil and Rhymney	Labour Party	2015
Chris Elmore	Ogmore	Labour Party	2016 by-election
Carolyn Harris	Swansea East	Labour Party	2015
David Jones	Clwyd West	Conservative Party	2005
Susan Jones	Clwyd South	Labour Party	2010
Liz Saville-Roberts	Dwyfor Meirionnydd	Plaid Cymru	2015
Ian Lucas	Wrexham	Labour Party	2001
Madeleine Moon	Bridgend	Labour Party	2005
Jessica Morden	Newport East	Labour Party	2005
Nick Thomas-Symonds	Torfaen	Labour Party	2015
Albert Owen	Ynys Môn	Labour Party	2001
Nick Smith	Blaenau Gwent	Labour Party	2010
Owen Smith	Pontypridd	Labour Party	2010
Jo Stevens	Cardiff Central	Labour Party	2015
Mark Tami	Alyn and Deeside	Labour Party	2001
Craig Williams	Cardiff North	Conservative Party	2015
Hywel Williams	Arfon	Plaid Cymru	2001
Mark Williams	Ceredigion	Liberal Democrats	2005

== By-elections ==
There has been one by-election since the 2015 general election in Ogmore following the election of Huw Irranca-Davies to the Welsh Assembly.

MP	Constituency	Party	In constituency since
Chris Elmore	Ogmore	Labour Party	2016

== See also ==
- 2015 United Kingdom general election
- List of MPs elected in the 2015 United Kingdom general election
- List of MPs for constituencies in England 2015–17
- List of MPs for constituencies in Scotland 2015–17
- List of MPs for constituencies in Northern Ireland 2015–17
