= 2017 Stoke-on-Trent Central by-election =

2017 UK Parliamentary by-election

- 23 February 2017

Stoke-on-Trent Central constituency Triggered by resignation of incumbent
- Turnout: 38.2%
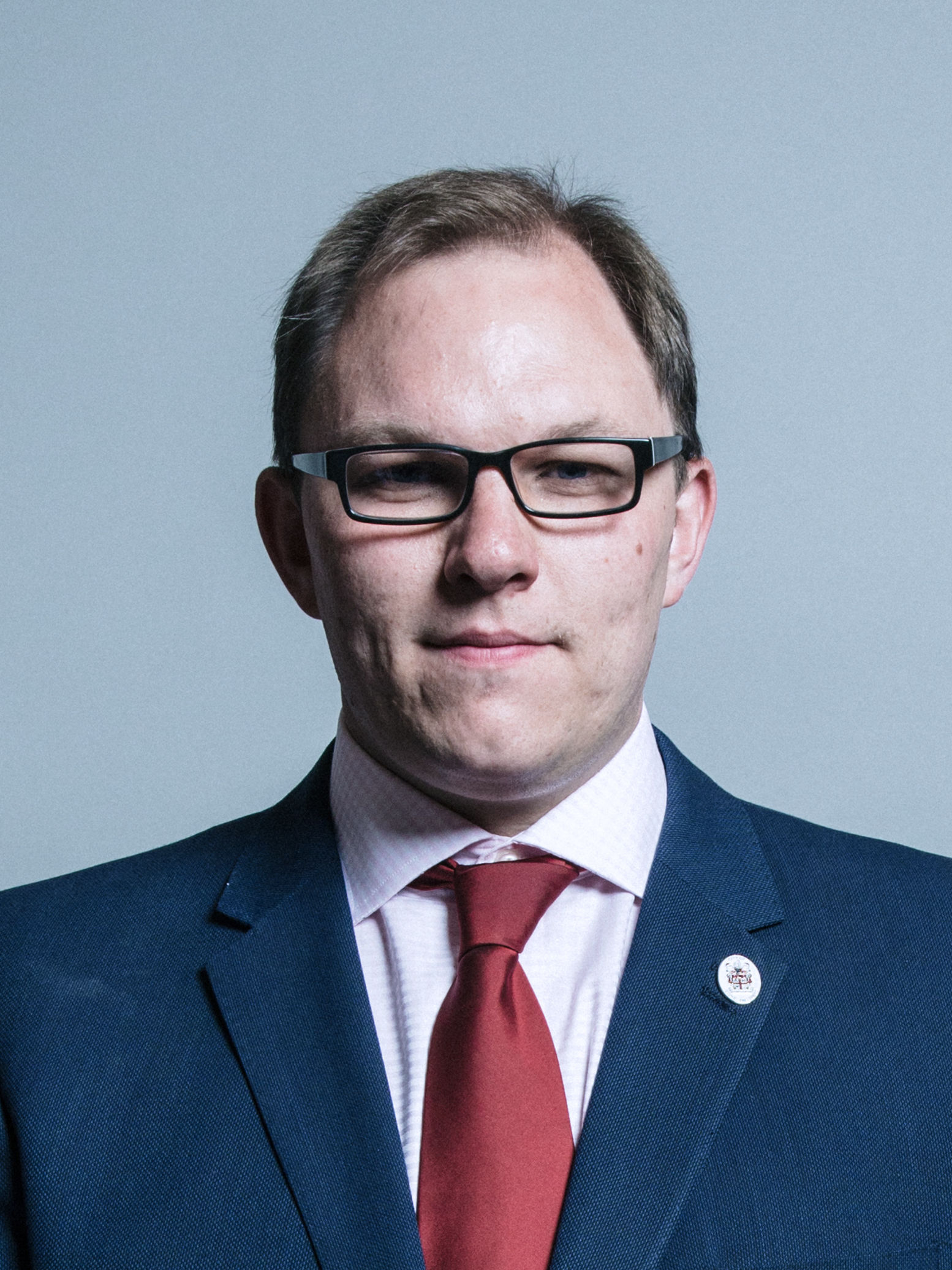

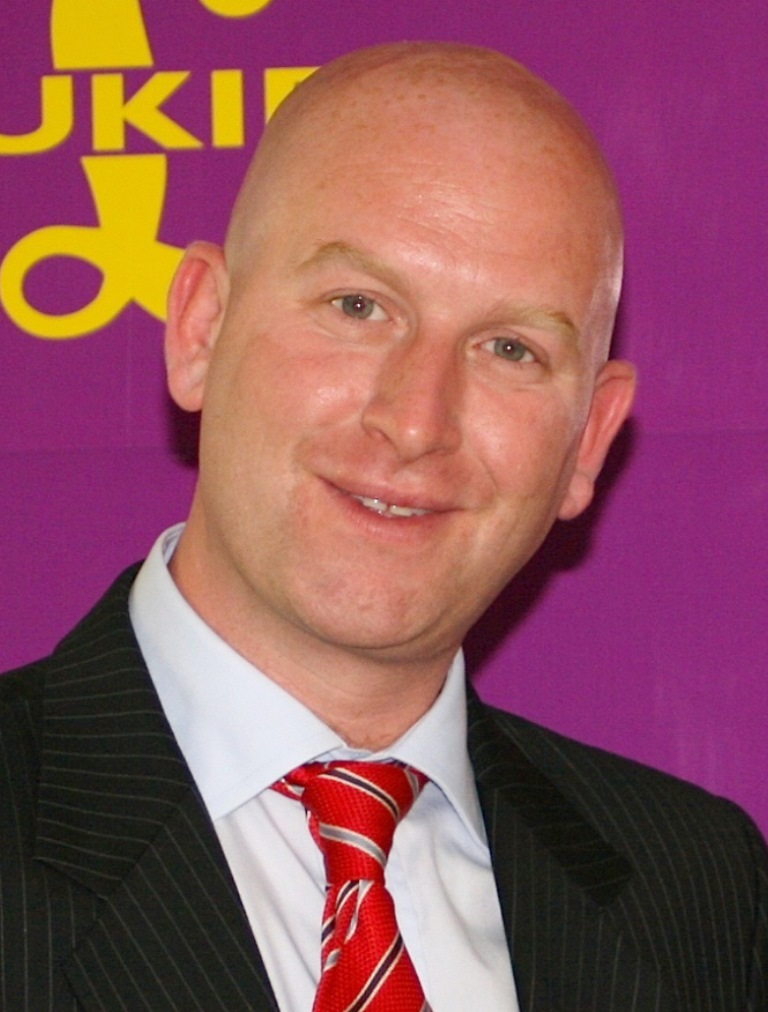

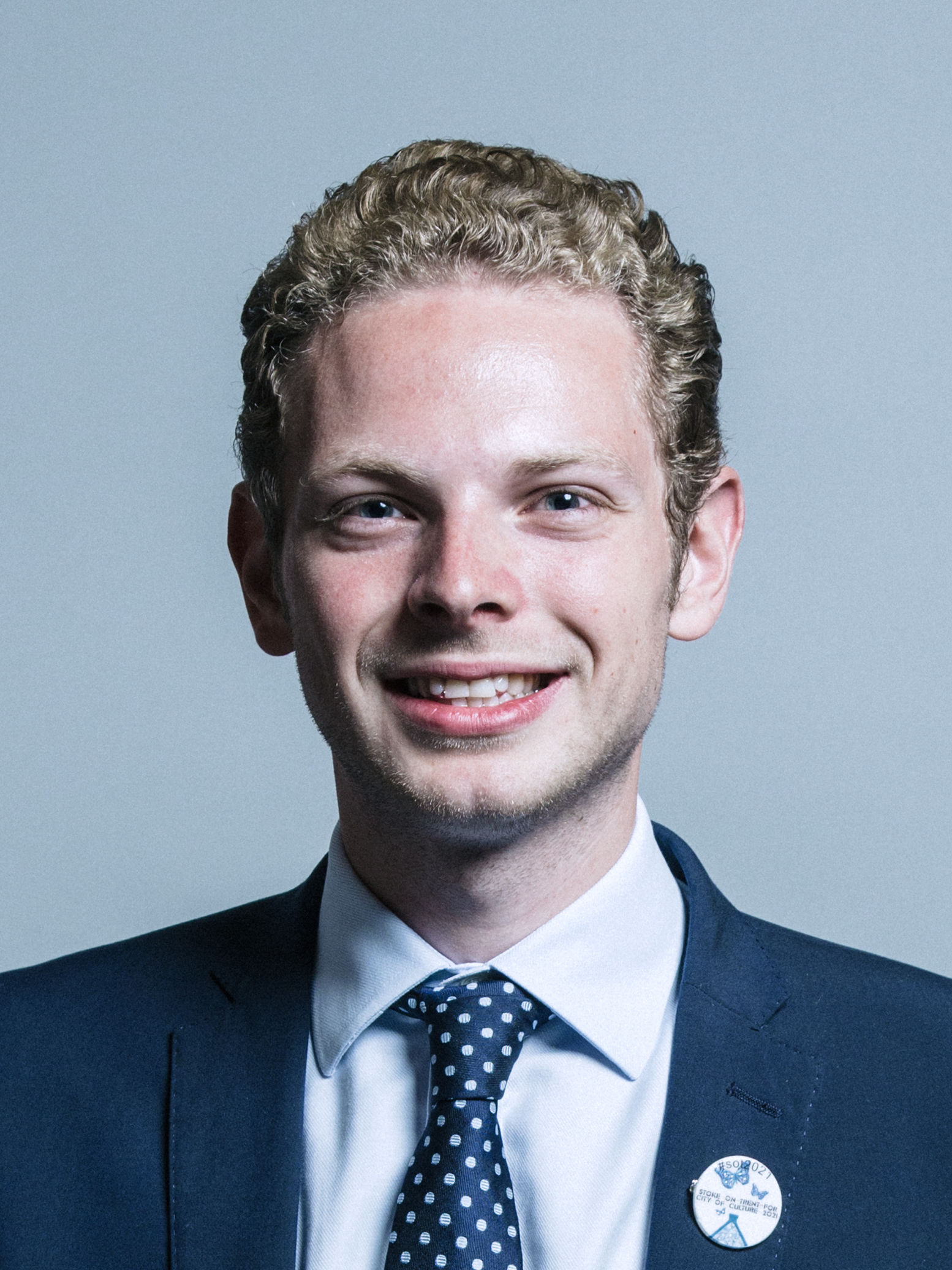
	First party	Second party
Candidate	Gareth Snell	Paul Nuttall
Party	Labour	UKIP
Popular vote	7,853	5,233
Percentage	37.1%	24.7%
Swing	▼2.2 pp	▲2.1 pp
	Third party	Fourth party
		Lib
Candidate	Jack Brereton	Zulfiqar Ali
Party	Conservative	Liberal Democrats
Popular vote	5,154	2,083
Percentage	24.3%	9.8%
Swing	▲1.8 pp	▲5.7 pp
MP before election
Tristram Hunt
Labour
Elected MP
Gareth Snell
Labour

A by-election for the United Kingdom parliamentary constituency of Stoke-on-Trent Central was held on 23 February 2017, following the resignation of incumbent Labour Party MP Tristram Hunt upon his appointment as director of the Victoria and Albert Museum in London. It was won by Labour candidate Gareth Snell, who held the seat with a slightly reduced majority.

Along with the 2017 Copeland by-election which took place on the same day, it was the last of ten by-elections to be held in the 2015–2017 parliament; a snap general election was held three months later.

== Background ==
The seat had been held by Labour since its creation for the 1950 general election, and by Tristram Hunt since 2010. The Liberal Democrats were second at the 2005 and 2010 elections, but the UK Independence Party (UKIP) came second in 2015. The constituency was set to be reshaped and renamed under the initial proposals of the sixth periodic review of Westminster constituencies.

The seat had a turnout of 49.9% in the 2015 general election, the lowest turnout in the country. The electorate is majority working class, with higher than average levels of unemployment. The constituency is entirely urban.

In the 2016 EU Referendum, Stoke-on-Trent (the whole council area) voted heavily to Leave the European Union: at 69.4%, this was the highest percentage in the West Midlands region. As the constituency is not coterminous with any local authority, the exact result for the parliamentary seat is unknown. However Chris Hanretty, a Reader in Politics at the University of East Anglia, estimated using a demographic model that in Stoke Central, 65.0% of voters voted 'Leave'.

According to figures released by Stoke-on-Trent City Council, over 2,500 new applications to vote had been received before the deadline for voter registration. This followed campaigns by the council and the Staffordshire University Students' Union to increase registration. The total number of eligible electors was 57,701, an increase of 4.3% on the figure when the election was called.

== Candidates and parties ==
=== Labour ===
On 16 January 2017, Jeremy Corbyn appointed Jack Dromey MP to run Labour's by-election campaign. The Labour shortlist for Stoke-on-Trent Central was confirmed as Councillor Alison Gardner, Dr Stephen Hitchin, Trudie McGuinness, and Councillor Gareth Snell. Hitchin withdrew from the contest prior to the hustings. Snell was selected as the Labour candidate on 25 January 2017. Snell is a member and former leader of Newcastle-under-Lyme Borough Council, and supported 'Remain' in the EU referendum. He did not support the re-election of Labour leader Jeremy Corbyn during the 2016 leadership election.

Snell's platform included policies of securing a deal for the city's ceramics industry from Brexit, attracting better-paid jobs to Stoke, and increasing the amount of affordable housing.

Snell was also criticised for historical Twitter posts he had made about women on television, Brexit and Labour leader Jeremy Corbyn.

=== UKIP ===
On 21 January, UKIP leader Paul Nuttall MEP was confirmed as the party's candidate. He had previously stood unsuccessfully for parliament four times. Nuttall became embroiled in controversy when his account of being present at the 1989 Hillsborough disaster was disputed by those who knew him at the time.

=== Conservatives ===
On 25 January the Conservatives selected Jack Brereton, councillor for the ward of Baddeley Green, Milton & Norton, as their candidate. Brereton is a member of the Stoke-on-Trent City Council cabinet and is a school governor.

Two days before Brereton's selection, an article in The Huffington Post quoted unnamed Conservative Party sources saying that the by-election in Stoke would be given lower priority than the Copeland by-election on the same day, which the party thought they had a better chance of winning. Former Conservative minister Esther McVey had previously suggested that UKIP was significantly better placed to win the Stoke by-election than the Conservatives.

Brereton's platform included securing local investment for Stoke, a crackdown on street drinking and anti-social behaviour, and placing controls on the number of EU migrants. He would become the MP for the neighbouring constituency of Stoke-on-Trent South at the general election held four months later.

=== Liberal Democrats ===
Dr Zulfiqar Ali, a National Health Service consultant who lives in Stoke, was the Liberal Democrat candidate. He contested the seat in 2015 and Stoke-on-Trent South in 2010.

=== Others ===
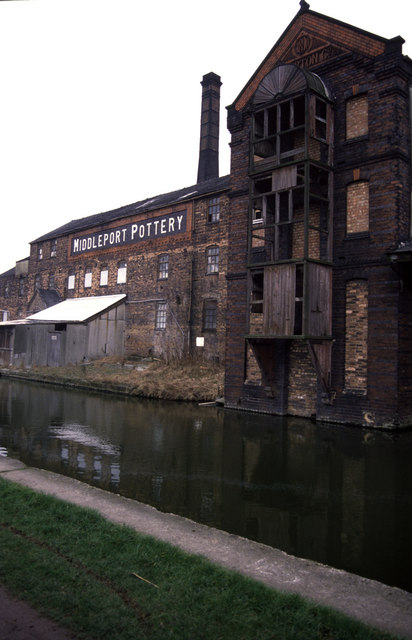
Several candidates had policies related to aiding Stoke's ceramics industry

On 31 January it was announced that Adam Colclough, who had stood in two council elections, would be standing for the Green Party.

Independent candidate Barbara Fielding-Morriss (standing under the name Barbara Fielding) is the registered leader of the party "Abolish Magna Carta, Reinstate Monarchy" and is recorded as a vexatious litigant. She is a self-declared white supremacist and anti-Semite. She was arrested during the election campaign for inciting racial hatred and imprisoned for the offence in 2018.

The Incredible Flying Brick stood as a candidate for the Official Monster Raving Loony Party. His policies included abolishing gravity and powering trains on gravy.

British National Party candidate David Furness stood for the party in the London Mayoral election in 2016, finishing tenth with 13,325 votes (0.5%). He had also contested two parliamentary by-elections: Feltham and Heston in 2011 and Batley and Spen in 2016, polling 540 (2.3%) and 548 votes (2.7%) respectively.

The Christian Peoples Alliance chose Godfrey Davies, a retired Merchant Navy deck officer from Congleton, Cheshire. Davies, whose party is pro-Brexit, planned to revive Stoke's ceramics industry, and stood for conservative positions on marriage and abortion.

Mohammed Akram ran as an independent, against the privatisation of the NHS, in favour of new council housing and a Brexit deal protecting migrants.

== Campaign ==
Early in the campaign, Labour candidate Gareth Snell attacked both UKIP and the Conservatives for their stance on NHS funding, while the Conservative, Brereton, raised Snell's opposition to Brexit in his acceptance speech as Conservative candidate.

On 3 February, it was reported by The Guardian that the Labour Party was exploring an agreement with the Liberal Democrats and the Green Party which would involve these parties deprioritising their respective campaigns in this by-election in order to assist Labour in defeating UKIP. The report also suggested that Liberal Democrat and Green candidates could withdraw, although under electoral law the deadline for formal withdrawals has passed and the candidates would remain on the ballot. On 4 February, a Labour spokesman denied this report when asked by The Independent.

All candidates, bar Nuttall, Fielding and Akram, took part in personal interviews for ITV News. Staffordshire University hosted a debate on 14 February, attended by all candidates bar Fielding and Akram, and attended by around 200 members of the public. The university's Professor of Journalism and Politics, Mick Temple, called it "one of the most important political elections in British political history". The NHS was a key topic of debate: Nuttall called for investment in healthcare instead of "vanity projects" like High Speed 2, Snell spoke of "stability" for EU-national NHS workers after Brexit, and Furness said that "third world" doctors and nurses were more needed in their countries of origin.

A major storm, named Doris, hit the constituency on polling day, which some commentators suggested would suppress turnout.

== Controversies ==
=== Paul Nuttall ===
On 1 February, it was reported that nomination papers submitted by UKIP candidate Paul Nuttall declared he was living in a house in Stoke that he had not moved into at the time they were filed, potentially an offence under the Representation of the People Act 1983. A spokesman for the UKIP campaign stated that the house had been rented by the party prior to the close of nominations and that Nuttall would be moving in that day. On 11 February, Nuttall moved out of the house following attempted break-ins and hate mail, and moved to another property in the Stoke Central constituency.

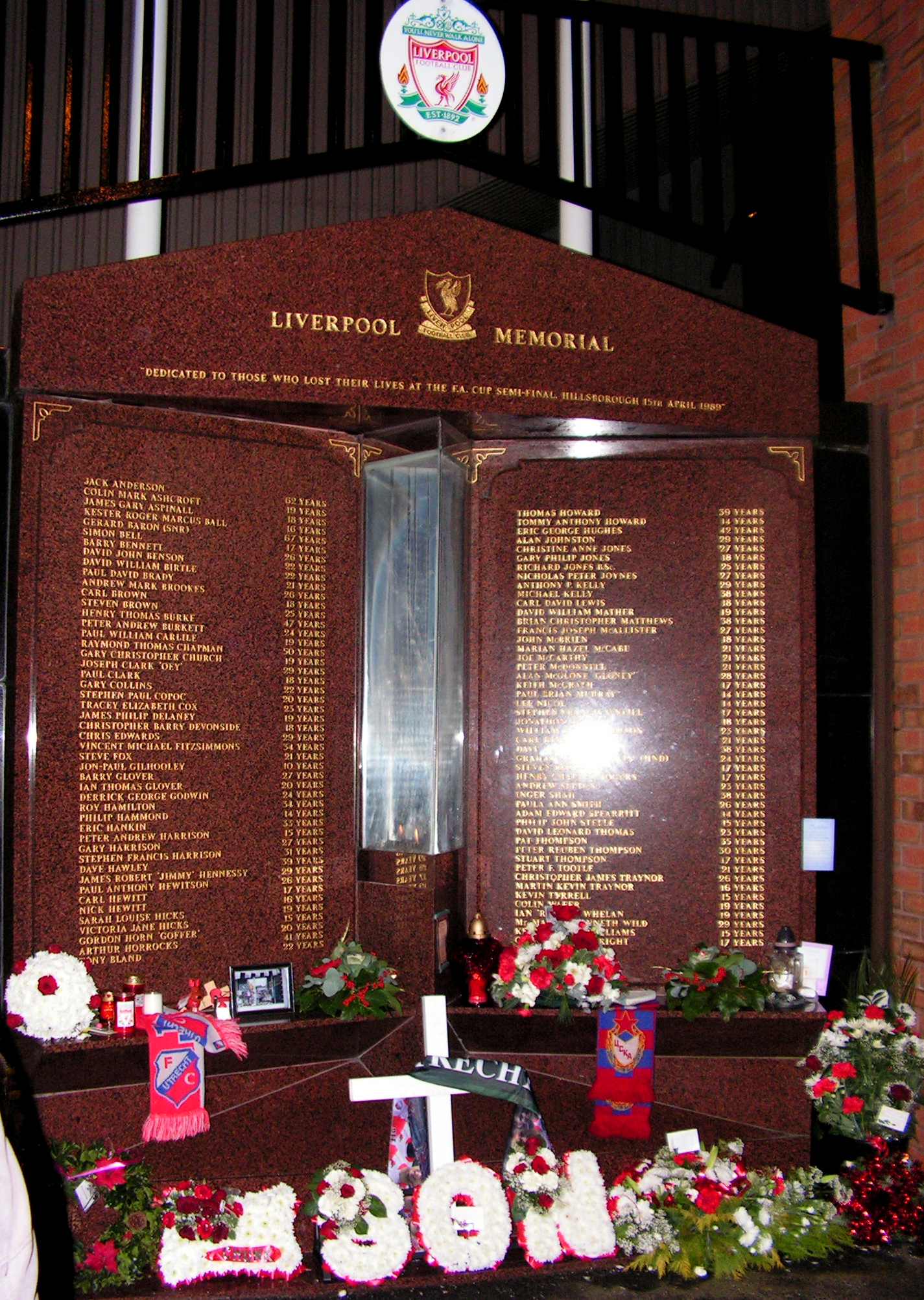
Nuttall became embroiled in controversy when his account of being present at the Hillsborough disaster was disputed

On 11 February, Nuttall was accused of lying about his claims to have been present at the Hillsborough disaster when he was 12. A former teacher at his school denied he was among pupils present.

The Hillsborough Families Support Group said they were surprised Nuttall had never offered to support their campaigns, while people who had known Nuttall at the time of the disaster and candidates he had previously stood against said they had no recollection of him mentioning it. UKIP released statements from Nuttall's father and a long-time friend who now works for the party stating that he had been at Hillsborough. Nuttall himself said that those who suggested he was not at the ground were the "scum of the earth" but declined to confirm whether he had given a statement to the police (as everyone at the ground on the day of the disaster has been asked to). A UKIP statement said that the claims were "a new low for the Labour party and its associates".

Nuttall was later challenged on a radio show about past UKIP press releases that he had lost "close personal friends" in the disaster: he admitted this was not true, saying "someone he knew" had died, and said that the press releases had not "come from him". A UKIP press officer subsequently took responsibility and offered to resign, but the resignation was not accepted by Nuttall. Two UKIP branch chairs resigned in response to Nuttall's actions and comments by UKIP donor Arron Banks on the subject. On 20 February, Nuttall gave a witness statement to police officers from Operation Resolve, who are investigating the causes of the Hillsborough disaster and whether there is any criminal culpability on the part of individuals or organisations.

=== Other ===
Snell was criticised for historical Twitter posts that he made about the appearance and moral character of several women on television, and apologised publicly. Among his other tweets were one where he called Brexit a "massive pile of shit", and Labour leader Corbyn an "IRA supporting friend of Hamas career politician". He responded by saying that despite his opposition to Brexit, he would not aim to overturn it and would look for the best deal for Stoke, and said that his comments on Corbyn were "to demonstrate the absurdity of the hyperbole".

UKIP Immigration spokesman John Bickley retweeted an Islamophobic cartoon saying "If you want a jihadi for a neighbour, vote Labour", a variation on an anti-black slogan from the notorious election campaign in Smethwick in 1964. He apologised for the racist origin of the phrase but not for the anti-Muslim content that he had shared.

Independent Barbara Fielding was arrested under Section 19 of the Public Order Act 1986, i.e. an offence to publish or distribute written material which may stir up racial hatred, because of material published on her website. Her posts had included praise for Adolf Hitler, and compared asylum seekers to termites. In June 2018, she was found guilty on three charges and not guilty of the fourth. On 3 October 2018 she was sentenced to twelve months imprisonment.

On 16 February, it was revealed that Muslim residents had received text messages urging them to vote tactically and suggesting they will have to "answer for this in the Grave and on the Final day" for voting for a party other than Labour. The Liberal Democrats, whose candidate is Muslim, condemned the move, and called on Labour to apologise. The Lib Dems later reported the incident to Staffordshire Police, as the incident may breach laws on undue spiritual influence.

Automated Twitter accounts, which usually posted pro-Russia propaganda, posted anti-UKIP and pro-Labour messages in the run-up to the by-election. A UKIP spokesman said that he was not concerned by the posts, nor did he believe they had been directed by President Vladimir Putin.

== Result ==
By-election 2017: Stoke-on-Trent Central
Party	Candidate	Votes	%	±%
Labour	Gareth Snell	7,853	37.1	▼2.2
UKIP	Paul Nuttall	5,233	24.7	▲2.1
Conservative	Jack Brereton	5,154	24.3	▲1.8
Liberal Democrats	Zulfiqar Ali	2,083	9.8	▲5.7
Green	Adam Colclough	294	1.4	▼2.2
Independent	Barbara Fielding	137	0.6	New
Monster Raving Loony	The Incredible Flying Brick	127	0.6	New
BNP	David Furness	124	0.6	New
CPA	Godfrey Davies	109	0.5	New
Independent	Mohammad Akram	56	0.3	New
Majority		2,620	12.4	▼4.3
Turnout		21,200	38.2	▼11.7
Labour hold		Swing	▼2.1	

=== Previous result ===
General election 2015: Stoke-on-Trent Central
Party	Candidate	Votes	%	±%
Labour	Tristram Hunt	12,220	39.3	+0.5
UKIP	Mick Harold	7,041	22.7	+18.3
Conservative	Liam Marshall-Ascough	7,008	22.5	+1.5
Independent	Mark Breeze	2,120	6.8	New
Liberal Democrats	Zulfiqar Ali	1,296	4.2	−17.5
Green	Jan Zablocki	1,123	3.6	New
CISTA	Ali Majid	244	0.8	New
The Ubuntu Party	Paul Toussaint	32	0.1	New
Majority		5,179	16.7	−0.5
Turnout		31,084	49.9	−3.3
Labour hold		Swing	-8.9	

== Reaction ==
The turnout of 38.2% was the lowest in the constituency's history, which has been one of markedly low turnouts.

After he was announced as the victor, Snell said that the people of Stoke had chosen the "politics of hope" over the "politics of fear". Labour MP Jack Dromey said that the party had to retain "humility" while it remained in opposition.

The result was widely described in the media as poor for UKIP, as they did not capitalise on their second place in 2015, Labour's poor standing in opinion polls, and the high support in the constituency for Brexit.

UKIP's campaign was criticised by former leader Nigel Farage, who said that Nuttall should have courted Conservative voters with rhetoric about immigration rather than look to gain votes from Labour. Major donor Arron Banks was critical of Nuttall for not expelling former Conservatives Douglas Carswell and Suzanne Evans from UKIP, saying that the failure at Stoke had proven that the party was not gaining votes from Conservatives; he threatened to withdraw funding unless he was made chairman to expel them himself. Carswell and Banks both left the party at the end of March.

In April 2020, Novara Media's Aaron Bastani claimed that members of Labour's senior management team (SMT), including the former general secretary Iain McNicol, actively attempted to get Labour to lose this by-election in the hope that such a defeat would remove Corbyn as leader.

== See also ==
- List of United Kingdom by-elections (2010–present)
