= List of MPs elected in the 2015 United Kingdom general election =

2015–2017 Parliament of the United Kingdom
←	2010–2015 Parliament	2017–2019 Parliament	→
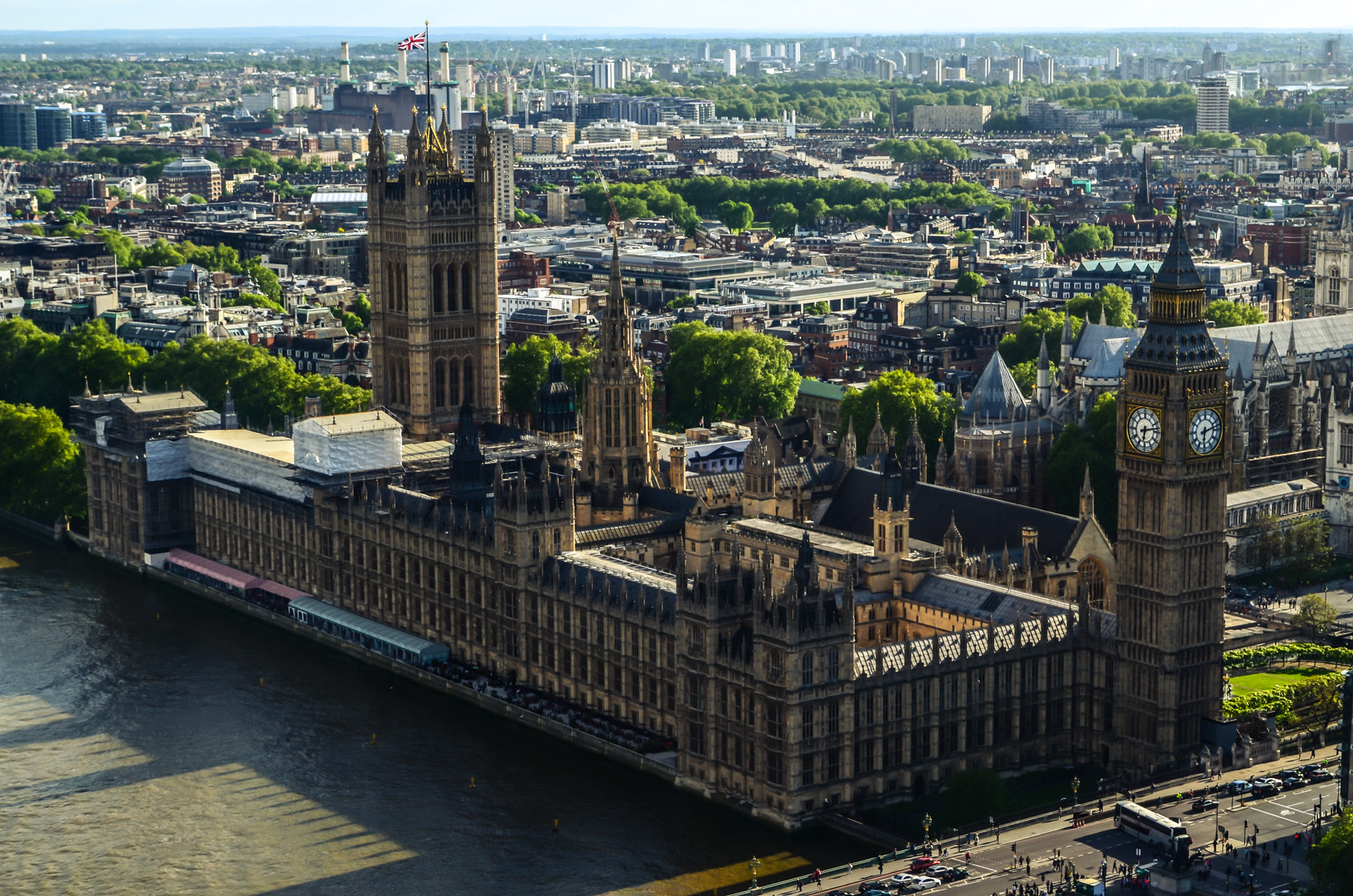
- Palace of Westminster in 2015

Overview
- Legislative body: Parliament of the United Kingdom
- Term: 27 May 2015 – 3 May 2017
- Election: 2015 United Kingdom general election
- Government: Second Cameron ministry (until 13 July 2016); First May ministry (from 13 July 2016)

House of Commons
- Members: 650
- Speaker: John Bercow
- Leader: David Lidington — Chris Grayling – until 14 July 2016
- Prime Minister: Theresa May — David Cameron – until 13 July 2016
- Leader of the Opposition: Jeremy Corbyn — Harriet Harman – acting until 12 September 2015
- Third-party leader: Angus Robertson

House of Lords
- Members: 780
- Lord Speaker: The Lord Fowler — The Baroness D'Souza – until 31 August 2016
- Leader: The Baroness Evans of Bowes Park — The Baroness Stowell of Beeston – until 14 July 2016
- Leader of the Opposition: The Baroness Smith of Basildon
- Third-party leader: The Lord Wallace of Tankerness
- Crown-in-Parliament: Queen Elizabeth II

Sessions
- 1st: 27 May 2015 – 12 May 2016
- 2nd: 18 May 2016 – 3 May 2017

This map shows by geography the colours each of the 650 constituencies of the 2015–17 Parliament.

The 2015 general election took place on 7 May 2015 and saw each of Parliament's 650 constituencies return one Member of Parliament (MP) to the House of Commons. Parliament, which consists of the House of Lords and the elected House of Commons, was convened on 27 May at the Palace of Westminster by Queen Elizabeth II. It was dissolved just after midnight on 3 May 2017, being 25 working days ahead of the general election on 8 June 2017. The dissolution was originally scheduled for 2020, but took place almost three years early following a call for a snap election by Conservative Prime Minister Theresa May which received the necessary two-thirds majority in a 522 to 13 vote in the House of Commons on 19 April 2017. It was the shortest Parliament since 1974.

The 2015 general election resulted in a Conservative majority, a massive loss of seats for the Liberal Democrats, and all but three Scottish seats going to the SNP. The UK Independence Party elected their first MP at a general election. The Alliance Party of Northern Ireland and the Respect Party lost their singular seats that they had in the previous Parliament. The Ulster Unionist Party won back representation electing two MPs, having had none in the previous Parliament.

Notable newcomers to enter the House of Commons in this General Election included future Prime Ministers Rishi Sunak and Keir Starmer, as well as the future parliamentary leaders of the Scottish National Party and Plaid Cymru; Ian Blackford and Liz Saville Roberts. Other new MPs included; Chris Philp, Rebecca Long-Bailey, Angela Rayner, Antoinette Sandbach, Mhairi Black, Richard Burgon, Sue Hayman, Joanna Cherry, Oliver Dowden, Andrea Jenkyns, Suella Braverman, Chris Matheson, Amanda Milling, Heidi Allen, Stephen Kinnock, Jess Phillips, Ruth Smeeth, Kelly Tolhurst, Tulip Siddiq, Amanda Solloway, Craig Mackinlay, Alison Thewliss and Clive Lewis.

During the 2015–17 Parliament, John Bercow was the Speaker of the House of Commons, David Cameron and Theresa May served as Prime Minister, and Harriet Harman and Jeremy Corbyn served as Leader of Her Majesty's Most Loyal Opposition.

== House of Commons composition ==
Below is a graphical representation of the House of Commons showing a comparison of party strengths as it was directly after the 2015 general election. This is not a seating plan of the House of Commons, which has five rows of benches on each side, with the government party to the right of the speaker and opposition parties to the left, but with room for only around two-thirds of MPs to sit at any one time.

The number of MPs in each party
Affiliation	Members	
Affiliation	At 2015 election	At dissolution
Conservative	330	330
Labour	232	229
SNP	56	54
Liberal Democrats	8	9
DUP	8	8
Independent	0	4
Sinn Féin	4	4
Plaid Cymru	3	3
SDLP	3	3
UUP	2	2
Green	1	1
Ind. Unionist	1	1
Speaker	1	1
UKIP	1	0
Vacant seats	0	1
Total	650	650
Government majority	16	17

Notes

- See here for a full list of changes during the fifty-sixth Parliament.
- In addition to the parties listed in the table above, the Co-operative Party was also represented in the House of Commons by Labour MPs sitting with the Labour Co-operative designation. The number of these MPs was 24 after the general election, and was 28 at dissolution.
- The actual government majority is calculated as Conservative MPs less all other parties. This calculation excludes the Speaker, Deputy Speakers (two Labour and one Conservative) and Sinn Féin (who follow a policy of abstentionism).

== List of MPs elected in the general election ==
The following table is a list of MPs elected, ordered by constituency. Names of incumbents are listed where they stood for re-election; for details of defeated new candidates and the incumbent who stood down in those cases see individual constituency articles.

Constituency	Party of incumbent before election	Member returned (2015)	Notes
Aberavon	Labour	The Hon. Stephen Kinnock (L)	Seat held, incumbent Hywel Francis stood down
Aberconwy	Conservative	Guto Bebb (C)	Seat held
Aberdeen North	Labour	Kirsty Blackman (SNP)	Seat gain, incumbent Frank Doran stood down
Aberdeen South	Labour	Callum McCaig (SNP)	Seat gain, defeated incumbent Dame Anne Begg
Airdrie and Shotts	Labour	Neil Gray (SNP)	Seat gain, defeated incumbent Pamela Nash
Aldershot	Conservative	Sir Gerald Howarth (C)	Seat held
Aldridge-Brownhills	Conservative	Wendy Morton (C)	Seat held, incumbent Sir Richard Shepherd stood down
Altrincham and Sale West	Conservative	Graham Brady (C)	Seat held
Alyn and Deeside	Labour	Mark Tami (L)	Seat held
Amber Valley	Conservative	Nigel Mills (C)	Seat held
Angus	SNP	Mike Weir (SNP)	Seat held
Arfon	Plaid Cymru	Hywel Williams (PC)	Seat held
Argyll and Bute	Liberal Democrats	Brendan O'Hara (SNP)	Seat gain, defeated incumbent Alan Reid
Arundel and South Downs	Conservative	Nick Herbert (C)	Seat held
Ashfield	Labour	Gloria De Piero (L)	Seat held
Ashford	Conservative	Damian Green (C)	Seat held
Ashton-under-Lyne	Labour	Angela Rayner (L)	Seat held, incumbent David Heyes stood down
Aylesbury	Conservative	David Lidington (C)	Seat held
Ayr, Carrick and Cumnock	Labour	Corri Wilson (SNP)	Seat gain, defeated incumbent Sandra Osborne
Banbury	Conservative	The Hon. Victoria Prentis (C)	Seat held, incumbent Sir Tony Baldry stood down
Banff and Buchan	SNP	Eilidh Whiteford (SNP)	Seat held
Barking	Labour	Margaret, Lady Hodge (L)	Seat held
Barnsley Central	Labour	Dan Jarvis (L)	Seat held
Barnsley East	Labour	Michael Dugher (L)	Seat held
Barrow and Furness	Labour Co-operative	John Woodcock (L Co-op)	Seat held
Basildon and Billericay	Conservative	John Baron (C)	Seat held
Basingstoke	Conservative	Maria Miller (C)	Seat held
Bassetlaw	Labour	John Mann (L)	Seat held
Bath	Liberal Democrats	Ben Howlett (C)	Seat gain, incumbent Don Foster stood down
Batley and Spen	Labour	Jo Cox (L)	Seat held, incumbent Mike Wood stood down
Battersea	Conservative	Jane Ellison (C)	Seat held
Beaconsfield	Conservative	Dominic Grieve (C)	Seat held
Beckenham	Conservative	Bob Stewart (C)	Seat held
Bedford	Conservative	Richard Fuller (C)	Seat held
Belfast East	Alliance	Gavin Robinson (DUP)	Seat gain, defeated incumbent Naomi Long
Belfast North	DUP	Nigel Dodds (DUP)	Seat held
Belfast South	SDLP	Alasdair McDonnell (SDLP)	Seat held
Belfast West	Sinn Féin	Paul Maskey (SF)	Seat held
Bermondsey and Old Southwark	Liberal Democrats	Neil Coyle (L)	Seat gain, defeated incumbent Simon Hughes
Berwick-upon-Tweed	Liberal Democrats	Anne-Marie Trevelyan (C)	Seat gain, incumbent Sir Alan Beith stood down
Berwickshire, Roxburgh and Selkirk	Liberal Democrats	Calum Kerr (SNP)	Seat gain, defeated incumbent Michael Moore
Bethnal Green and Bow	Labour	Rushanara Ali (L)	Seat held
Beverley and Holderness	Conservative	Graham Stuart (C)	Seat held
Bexhill and Battle	Conservative	Huw Merriman (C)	Seat held, incumbent Gregory Barker stood down
Bexleyheath and Crayford	Conservative	David Evennett (C)	Seat held
Birkenhead	Labour	Frank Field (L)	Seat held
Birmingham, Edgbaston	Labour	Gisela Stuart (L)	Seat held
Birmingham, Erdington	Labour	Jack Dromey (L)	Seat held
Birmingham, Hall Green	Labour	Roger Godsiff (L)	Seat held
Birmingham, Hodge Hill	Labour	Liam Byrne (L)	Seat held
Birmingham, Ladywood	Labour	Shabana Mahmood (L)	Seat held
Birmingham, Northfield	Labour	Richard Burden (L)	Seat held
Birmingham, Perry Barr	Labour	Khalid Mahmood (L)	Seat held
Birmingham, Selly Oak	Labour	Steve McCabe (L)	Seat held
Birmingham, Yardley	Liberal Democrats	Jess Phillips (L)	Seat gain, defeated incumbent John Hemming
Bishop Auckland	Labour	Helen Goodman (L)	Seat held
Blackburn	Independent (Note: The incumbents for these seats were originally members of political parties before either being suspended or resigning from their respective parties and subsequently sitting as independents for the remainder of the Parliament.)	Kate Hollern (L)	Seat held, incumbent Jack Straw stood down
Blackley and Broughton	Labour	Graham Stringer (L)	Seat held
Blackpool North and Cleveleys	Conservative	Paul Maynard (C)	Seat held
Blackpool South	Labour	Gordon Marsden (L)	Seat held
Blaenau Gwent	Labour	Nick Smith (L)	Seat held
Blaydon	Labour	David Anderson (L)	Seat held
Blyth Valley	Labour	Ronnie Campbell (L)	Seat held
Bognor Regis and Littlehampton	Conservative	Nick Gibb (C)	Seat held
Bolsover	Labour	Dennis Skinner (L)	Seat held
Bolton North East	Labour	David Crausby (L)	Seat held
Bolton South East	Labour	Yasmin Qureshi (L)	Seat held
Bolton West	Labour	Chris Green (C)	Seat gain, defeated incumbent Julie Hilling
Bootle	Labour	Peter Dowd (L)	Seat held, incumbent Joe Benton stood down
Boston and Skegness	Conservative	Matt Warman (C)	Seat held, incumbent Mark Simmonds stood down
Bosworth	Conservative	David Tredinnick (C)	Seat held
Bournemouth East	Conservative	Tobias Ellwood (C)	Seat held
Bournemouth West	Conservative	Conor Burns (C)	Seat held
Bracknell	Conservative	Phillip Lee (C)	Seat held
Bradford East	Liberal Democrats	Imran Hussain (L)	Seat gain, defeated incumbent David Ward
Bradford South	Labour	Judith Cummins (L)	Seat held, incumbent Gerry Sutcliffe stood down
Bradford West	Respect	Naz Shah (L)	Seat gain, defeated incumbent George Galloway
Braintree	Conservative	James Cleverly (C)	Seat held, incumbent Brooks Newmark stood down
Brecon and Radnorshire	Liberal Democrats	Christopher Davies (C)	Seat gain, defeated incumbent Roger Hugh Williams
Brent Central	Liberal Democrats	Dawn Butler (L)	Seat gain, incumbent Sarah Teather stood down
Brent North	Labour	Barry Gardiner (L)	Seat held
Brentford and Isleworth	Conservative	Ruth Cadbury (L)	Seat gain, defeated incumbent Mary Macleod
Brentwood and Ongar	Conservative	Sir Eric Pickles (C)	Seat held
Bridgend	Labour	Madeleine Moon (L)	Seat held
Bridgwater and West Somerset	Conservative	Ian Liddell-Grainger (C)	Seat held
Brigg and Goole	Conservative	Andrew Percy (C)	Seat held
Brighton Kemptown	Conservative	Simon Kirby (C)	Seat held
Brighton Pavilion	Green Party	Caroline Lucas (Green)	Seat held
Bristol East	Labour	Kerry McCarthy (L)	Seat held
Bristol North West	Conservative	Charlotte Leslie (C)	Seat held
Bristol South	Labour	Karin Smyth (L)	Seat held, incumbent Dame Dawn Primarolo stood down
Bristol West	Liberal Democrats	Thangam Debbonaire (L)	Seat gain, defeated incumbent Stephen Williams
Broadland	Conservative	Keith Simpson (C)	Seat held
Bromley and Chislehurst	Conservative	Bob Neill (C)	Seat held
Bromsgrove	Conservative	Sajid Javid (C)	Seat held
Broxbourne	Conservative	Charles Walker (C)	Seat held
Broxtowe	Conservative	Anna Soubry (C)	Seat held
Buckingham	The Speaker seeking re-election	John Bercow (Speaker)	Seat held
Burnley	Liberal Democrats	Julie Cooper (L)	Seat gain, defeated incumbent Gordon Birtwistle
Burton	Conservative	Andrew Griffiths (C)	Seat held
Bury North	Conservative	David Nuttall (C)	Seat held
Bury South	Labour	Ivan Lewis (L)	Seat held
Bury St Edmunds	Conservative	Jo Churchill (C)	Seat held, incumbent David Ruffley stood down
Caerphilly	Labour	Wayne David (L)	Seat held
Caithness, Sutherland and Easter Ross	Liberal Democrats	Paul Monaghan (SNP)	Seat gain, defeated incumbent Viscount Thurso
Calder Valley	Conservative	Craig Whittaker (C)	Seat held
Camberwell and Peckham	Labour	Harriet Harman (L)	Seat held
Camborne and Redruth	Conservative	George Eustice (C)	Seat held
Cambridge	Liberal Democrats	Daniel Zeichner (L)	Seat gain, defeated incumbent Julian Huppert
Cannock Chase	Conservative	Amanda Milling (C)	Seat held, incumbent Aidan Burley stood down
Canterbury	Conservative	Julian Brazier (C)	Seat held
Cardiff Central	Liberal Democrats	Jo Stevens (L)	Seat gain, defeated incumbent Jenny Willott
Cardiff North	Conservative	Craig Williams (C)	Seat held, incumbent Jonathan Evans stood down
Cardiff South and Penarth	Labour Co-operative	Stephen Doughty (L Co-op)	Seat held
Cardiff West	Labour	Kevin Brennan (L)	Seat held
Carlisle	Conservative	John Stevenson (C)	Seat held
Carmarthen East and Dinefwr	Plaid Cymru	Jonathan Edwards (PC)	Seat held
Carmarthen West and South Pembrokeshire	Conservative	Simon Hart (C)	Seat held
Carshalton and Wallington	Liberal Democrats	Tom Brake (LD)	Seat held
Castle Point	Conservative	Rebecca Harris (C)	Seat held
Central Ayrshire	Labour	Philippa Whitford (SNP)	Seat gain, defeated incumbent Brian Donohoe
Central Devon	Conservative	Mel Stride (C)	Seat held
Central Suffolk and North Ipswich	Conservative	Daniel Poulter (C)	Seat held
Ceredigion	Liberal Democrats	Mark Williams (LD)	Seat held
Charnwood	Conservative	Edward Argar (C)	Seat held, incumbent Stephen Dorrell stood down
Chatham and Aylesford	Conservative	Tracey Crouch (C)	Seat held
Cheadle	Liberal Democrats	Mary Robinson (C)	Seat gain, defeated incumbent Mark Hunter
Chelmsford	Conservative	Sir Simon Burns (C)	Seat held
Chelsea and Fulham	Conservative	Greg Hands (C)	Seat held
Cheltenham	Liberal Democrats	Alex Chalk (C)	Seat gain, defeated incumbent Martin Horwood
Chesham and Amersham	Conservative	Cheryl Gillan (C)	Seat held
Chesterfield	Labour	Toby Perkins (L)	Seat held
Chichester	Conservative	Andrew Tyrie (C)	Seat held
Chingford and Woodford Green	Conservative	Iain Duncan Smith (C)	Seat held
Chippenham	Liberal Democrats	Michelle Donelan (C)	Seat gain, defeated incumbent Duncan Hames
Chipping Barnet	Conservative	Theresa Villiers (C)	Seat held
Chorley	Labour	Lindsay Hoyle (L)	Seat held
Christchurch	Conservative	Christopher Chope (C)	Seat held
Cities of London and Westminster	Conservative	Mark Field (C)	Seat held
City of Chester	Conservative	Chris Matheson (L)	Seat gain, defeated incumbent Stephen Mosley
Clacton	UKIP	Douglas Carswell (UKIP)	Seat held
Cleethorpes	Conservative	Martin Vickers (C)	Seat held
Clwyd South	Labour	Susan Elan Jones (L)	Seat held
Clwyd West	Conservative	David Jones (C)	Seat held
Coatbridge, Chryston and Bellshill	Labour	Phil Boswell (SNP)	Seat gain, defeated incumbent Tom Clarke
Colchester	Liberal Democrats	Will Quince (C)	Seat gain, defeated incumbent Sir Bob Russell
Colne Valley	Conservative	Jason McCartney (C)	Seat held
Congleton	Conservative	Fiona Bruce (C)	Seat held
Copeland	Labour	Jamie Reed (L)	Seat held
Corby	Labour Co-operative	Tom Pursglove (C)	Seat gain, defeated incumbent Andy Sawford
The Cotswolds	Conservative	Geoffrey Clifton-Brown (C)	Seat held
Coventry North East	Labour	Colleen Fletcher (L)	Seat held, incumbent Bob Ainsworth stood down
Coventry North West	Labour	Geoffrey Robinson (L)	Seat held
Coventry South	Labour	Jim Cunningham (L)	Seat held
Crawley	Conservative	Henry Smith (C)	Seat held
Crewe and Nantwich	Conservative	Edward Timpson (C)	Seat held
Croydon Central	Conservative	Gavin Barwell (C)	Seat held
Croydon North	Labour Co-operative	Steve Reed (L Co-op)	Seat held
Croydon South	Conservative	Chris Philp (C)	Seat held, incumbent Sir Richard Ottaway stood down
Cumbernauld, Kilsyth and Kirkintilloch East	Labour	Stuart McDonald (SNP)	Seat gain, defeated incumbent Gregg McClymont
Cynon Valley	Labour	Ann Clwyd (L)	Seat held
Dagenham and Rainham	Labour	Jon Cruddas (L)	Seat held
Darlington	Labour	Jenny Chapman (L)	Seat held
Dartford	Conservative	Gareth Johnson (C)	Seat held
Daventry	Conservative	Chris Heaton-Harris (C)	Seat held
Delyn	Labour	David Hanson (L)	Seat held
Denton and Reddish	Labour	Andrew Gwynne (L)	Seat held
Derby North	Labour	Amanda Solloway (C)	Seat gain, defeated incumbent Chris Williamson
Derby South	Labour	Dame Margaret Beckett (L)	Seat held
Derbyshire Dales	Conservative	Patrick McLoughlin (C)	Seat held
Devizes	Conservative	Claire Perry (C)	Seat held
Dewsbury	Conservative	Paula Sherriff (L)	Seat gain, defeated incumbent Simon Reevell
Don Valley	Labour	Caroline Flint (L)	Seat held
Doncaster Central	Labour	Rosie Winterton (L)	Seat held
Doncaster North	Labour	Ed Miliband (L)	Seat held
Dover	Conservative	Charlie Elphicke (C)	Seat held
Dudley North	Labour	Ian Austin (L)	Seat held
Dudley South	Conservative	Mike Wood (C)	Seat held, incumbent Chris Kelly stood down
Dulwich and West Norwood	Labour	Helen Hayes (L)	Seat held, incumbent Dame Tessa Jowell stood down
Dumfries and Galloway	Labour	Richard Arkless (SNP)	Seat gain, defeated incumbent Russell Brown
Dumfriesshire, Clydesdale and Tweeddale	Conservative	David Mundell (C)	Seat held
Dundee East	SNP	Stewart Hosie (SNP)	Seat held
Dundee West	Labour	Chris Law (SNP)	Seat gain, incumbent Jim McGovern stood down
Dunfermline and West Fife	Labour	Douglas Chapman (SNP)	Seat gain, defeated incumbent Thomas Docherty
City of Durham	Labour	Roberta Blackman-Woods (L)	Seat held
Dwyfor Meirionnydd	Plaid Cymru	Liz Saville-Roberts (PC)	Seat held, incumbent Elfyn Llwyd stood down
Ealing Central and Acton	Conservative	Rupa Huq (L)	Seat gain, defeated incumbent Angie Bray
Ealing North	Labour	Stephen Pound (L)	Seat held
Ealing Southall	Labour	Virendra Sharma (L)	Seat held
Easington	Labour	Grahame Morris (L)	Seat held
East Antrim	DUP	Sammy Wilson (DUP)	Seat held
East Devon	Conservative	Hugo Swire (C)	Seat held
East Dunbartonshire	Liberal Democrats	John Nicolson (SNP)	Seat gain, defeated incumbent Jo Swinson
East Ham	Labour	Stephen Timms (L)	Seat held
East Hampshire	Conservative	Damian Hinds (C)	Seat held
East Kilbride, Strathaven and Lesmahagow	Labour	Lisa Cameron (SNP)	Seat gain, defeated incumbent Michael McCann
East Londonderry	DUP	Gregory Campbell (DUP)	Seat held
East Lothian	Labour	George Kerevan (SNP)	Seat gain, defeated incumbent Fiona O'Donnell
East Renfrewshire	Labour	Kirsten Oswald (SNP)	Seat gain, defeated incumbent Jim Murphy
East Surrey	Conservative	Sam Gyimah (C)	Seat held
East Worthing and Shoreham	Conservative	Tim Loughton (C)	Seat held
East Yorkshire	Conservative	Sir Greg Knight (C)	Seat held
Eastbourne	Liberal Democrats	Caroline Ansell (C)	Seat gain, defeated incumbent Stephen Lloyd
Eastleigh	Liberal Democrats	Mims Davies (C)	Seat gain, defeated incumbent Mike Thornton
Eddisbury	Conservative	Antoinette Sandbach (C)	Seat held, incumbent Stephen O'Brien stood down
Edinburgh East	Labour	Tommy Sheppard (SNP)	Seat gain, defeated incumbent Sheila Gilmore
Edinburgh North and Leith	Labour Co-operative	Deidre Brock (SNP)	Seat gain, defeated incumbent Mark Lazarowicz
Edinburgh South	Labour	Ian Murray (L)	Seat held
Edinburgh South West	Labour	Joanna Cherry (SNP)	Seat gain, incumbent Alistair Darling stood down
Edinburgh West	Liberal Democrats	Michelle Thomson (SNP)	Seat gain, defeated incumbent Michael Crockart
Edmonton	Labour Co-operative	Kate Osamor (L Co-op)	Seat held, incumbent Andy Love stood down
Ellesmere Port and Neston	Labour	Justin Madders (L)	Seat held, incumbent Andrew Miller stood down
Elmet and Rothwell	Conservative	Alec Shelbrooke (C)	Seat held
Eltham	Labour	Clive Efford (L)	Seat held
Enfield North	Conservative	Joan Ryan (L)	Seat gain, defeated incumbent Nick de Bois
Enfield Southgate	Conservative	David Burrowes (C)	Seat held
Epping Forest	Conservative	Eleanor Laing (C)	Seat held
Epsom and Ewell	Conservative	Chris Grayling (C)	Seat held
Erewash	Conservative	Maggie Throup (C)	Seat held, incumbent Jessica Lee stood down
Erith and Thamesmead	Labour	Teresa Pearce (L)	Seat held
Esher and Walton	Conservative	Dominic Raab (C)	Seat held
Exeter	Labour	Ben Bradshaw (L)	Seat held
Falkirk	Independent	John McNally (SNP)	Seat gain, incumbent Eric Joyce (originally a Labour MP) stood down
Fareham	Conservative	Suella Fernandes (C)	Seat held, incumbent Mark Hoban stood down
Faversham and Mid Kent	Conservative	Helen Whately (C)	Seat held, incumbent Sir Hugh Robertson stood down
Feltham and Heston	Labour Co-operative	Seema Malhotra (L Co-op)	Seat held
Fermanagh and South Tyrone	Sinn Féin	Tom Elliott (UUP)	Seat gain, defeated incumbent Michelle Gildernew
Filton and Bradley Stoke	Conservative	Jack Lopresti (C)	Seat held
Finchley and Golders Green	Conservative	Mike Freer (C)	Seat held
Folkestone and Hythe	Conservative	Damian Collins (C)	Seat held
Forest of Dean	Conservative	Mark Harper (C)	Seat held
Foyle	SDLP	Mark Durkan (SDLP)	Seat held
Fylde	Conservative	Mark Menzies (C)	Seat held
Gainsborough	Conservative	Sir Edward Leigh (C)	Seat held
Garston and Halewood	Labour	Maria Eagle (L)	Seat held
Gateshead	Labour	Ian Mearns (L)	Seat held
Gedling	Labour	Vernon Coaker (L)	Seat held
Gillingham and Rainham	Conservative	Rehman Chishti (C)	Seat held
Glasgow Central	Labour	Alison Thewliss (SNP)	Seat gain, defeated incumbent Anas Sarwar
Glasgow East	Labour	Natalie McGarry (SNP)	Seat gain, defeated incumbent Margaret Curran
Glasgow North	Labour	Patrick Grady (SNP)	Seat gain, defeated incumbent Ann McKechin
Glasgow North East	Labour	Anne McLaughlin (SNP)	Seat gain, defeated incumbent Willie Bain
Glasgow North West	Labour	Carol Monaghan (SNP)	Seat gain, defeated incumbent John Robertson
Glasgow South	Labour	Stewart McDonald (SNP)	Seat gain, defeated incumbent Tom Harris
Glasgow South West	Labour Co-operative	Chris Stephens (SNP)	Seat gain, defeated incumbent Ian Davidson
Glenrothes	Labour	Peter Grant (SNP)	Seat gain, incumbent Lindsay Roy stood down
Gloucester	Conservative	Richard Graham (C)	Seat held
Gordon	Liberal Democrats	Alex Salmond (SNP)	Seat gain, incumbent Sir Malcolm Bruce stood down
Gosport	Conservative	Caroline Dinenage (C)	Seat held
Gower	Labour	Byron Davies (C)	Seat gain, incumbent Martin Caton stood down
Grantham and Stamford	Conservative	Nicholas Boles (C)	Seat held
Gravesham	Conservative	Adam Holloway (C)	Seat held
Great Grimsby	Labour	Melanie Onn (L)	Seat held, incumbent Austin Mitchell stood down
Great Yarmouth	Conservative	Brandon Lewis (C)	Seat held
Greenwich and Woolwich	Labour	Matthew Pennycook (L)	Seat held, incumbent Nick Raynsford stood down
Guildford	Conservative	Anne Milton (C)	Seat held
Hackney North and Stoke Newington	Labour	Diane Abbott (L)	Seat held
Hackney South and Shoreditch	Labour Co-operative	Meg Hillier (L Co-op)	Seat held
Halesowen and Rowley Regis	Conservative	James Morris (C)	Seat held
Halifax	Labour Co-operative	Holly Lynch (L)	Seat held, incumbent Linda Riordan stood down
Haltemprice and Howden	Conservative	David Davis (C)	Seat held
Halton	Labour	Derek Twigg (L)	Seat held
Hammersmith	Labour	Andy Slaughter (L)	Seat held
Hampstead and Kilburn	Labour	Tulip Siddiq (L)	Seat held, incumbent Glenda Jackson stood down
Harborough	Conservative	Sir Edward Garnier (C)	Seat held
Harlow	Conservative	Robert Halfon (C)	Seat held
Harrogate and Knaresborough	Conservative	Andrew Jones (C)	Seat held
Harrow East	Conservative	Bob Blackman (C)	Seat held
Harrow West	Labour Co-operative	Gareth Thomas (L Co-op)	Seat held
Hartlepool	Labour	Iain Wright (L)	Seat held
Harwich and North Essex	Conservative	The Hon. Bernard Jenkin (C)	Seat held
Hastings and Rye	Conservative	Amber Rudd (C)	Seat held
Havant	Conservative	Alan Mak (C)	Seat held, incumbent David Willetts stood down
Hayes and Harlington	Labour	John McDonnell (L)	Seat held
Hazel Grove	Liberal Democrats	William Wragg (C)	Seat gain, incumbent Sir Andrew Stunell stood down
Hemel Hempstead	Conservative	Mike Penning (C)	Seat held
Hemsworth	Labour	Jon Trickett (L)	Seat held
Hendon	Conservative	Matthew Offord (C)	Seat held
Henley	Conservative	John Howell (C)	Seat held
Hereford and South Herefordshire	Conservative	Jesse Norman (C)	Seat held
Hertford and Stortford	Conservative	Mark Prisk (C)	Seat held
Hertsmere	Conservative	Oliver Dowden (C)	Seat held, incumbent James Clappison stood down
Hexham	Conservative	Guy Opperman (C)	Seat held
Heywood and Middleton	Labour	Liz McInnes (L)	Seat held
High Peak	Conservative	Andrew Bingham (C)	Seat held
Hitchin and Harpenden	Conservative	Peter Lilley (C)	Seat held
Holborn and St Pancras	Labour	Keir Starmer (L)	Seat held, incumbent Frank Dobson stood down
Hornchurch and Upminster	Conservative	Dame Angela Watkinson (C)	Seat held
Hornsey and Wood Green	Liberal Democrats	Catherine West (L)	Seat gain, defeated incumbent Lynne Featherstone
Horsham	Conservative	Jeremy Quin (C)	Seat held, incumbent Francis Maude stood down
Houghton and Sunderland South	Labour	Bridget Phillipson (L)	Seat held
Hove	Conservative	Peter Kyle (L)	Seat gain, incumbent Mike Weatherley stood down
Huddersfield	Labour Co-operative	Barry Sheerman (L Co-op)	Seat held
Huntingdon	Conservative	Jonathan Djanogly (C)	Seat held
Hyndburn	Labour	Graham Jones (L)	Seat held
Ilford North	Conservative	Wes Streeting (L)	Seat gain, defeated incumbent Lee Scott
Ilford South	Labour Co-operative	Mike Gapes (L Co-op)	Seat held
Inverclyde	Labour	Ronnie Cowan (SNP)	Seat gain, defeated incumbent Iain McKenzie
Inverness, Nairn, Badenoch and Strathspey	Liberal Democrats	Drew Hendry (SNP)	Seat gain, defeated incumbent Danny Alexander
Ipswich	Conservative	The Hon. Ben Gummer (C)	Seat held
Isle of Wight	Conservative	Andrew Turner (C)	Seat held
Islington North	Labour	Jeremy Corbyn (L)	Seat held
Islington South and Finsbury	Labour	Emily Thornberry (L)	Seat held
Islwyn	Labour Co-operative	Chris Evans (L Co-op)	Seat held
Jarrow	Labour	Stephen Hepburn (L)	Seat held
Keighley	Conservative	Kris Hopkins (C)	Seat held
Kenilworth and Southam	Conservative	Jeremy Wright (C)	Seat held
Kensington	Independent	Victoria, Lady Borwick (C)	Seat held, incumbent Sir Malcolm Rifkind stood down
Kettering	Conservative	Philip Hollobone (C)	Seat held
Kilmarnock and Loudoun	Labour Co-operative	Alan Brown (SNP)	Seat gain, defeated incumbent Cathy Jamieson
Kingston and Surbiton	Liberal Democrats	James Berry (C)	Seat gain, defeated incumbent Ed Davey
Kingston upon Hull East	Labour	Karl Turner (L)	Seat held
Kingston upon Hull North	Labour	Diana Johnson (L)	Seat held
Kingston upon Hull West and Hessle	Labour	Alan Johnson (L)	Seat held
Kingswood	Conservative	Chris Skidmore (C)	Seat held
Kirkcaldy and Cowdenbeath	Labour	Roger Mullin (SNP)	Seat gain, incumbent Gordon Brown stood down
Knowsley	Labour	George Howarth (L)	Seat held
Lagan Valley	DUP	Jeffrey Donaldson (DUP)	Seat held
Lanark and Hamilton East	Labour	Angela Crawley (SNP)	Seat gain, defeated incumbent Jimmy Hood
Lancaster and Fleetwood	Conservative	Cat Smith (L)	Seat gain, defeated incumbent Eric Ollerenshaw
Leeds Central	Labour	Hilary Benn (L)	Seat held
Leeds East	Labour	Richard Burgon (L)	Seat held, incumbent George Mudie stood down
Leeds North East	Labour	Fabian Hamilton (L)	Seat held
Leeds North West	Liberal Democrats	Greg Mulholland (LD)	Seat held
Leeds West	Labour	Rachel Reeves (L)	Seat held
Leicester East	Labour	Keith Vaz (L)	Seat held
Leicester South	Labour Co-operative	Jon Ashworth (L Co-op)	Seat held
Leicester West	Labour	Liz Kendall (L)	Seat held
Leigh	Labour	Andy Burnham (L)	Seat held
Lewes	Liberal Democrats	Maria Caulfield (C)	Seat gain, defeated incumbent Norman Baker
Lewisham East	Labour	Heidi Alexander (L)	Seat held
Lewisham West and Penge	Labour	Jim Dowd (L)	Seat held
Lewisham Deptford	Labour	Vicky Foxcroft (L)	Seat held, incumbent Dame Joan Ruddock stood down
Leyton and Wanstead	Labour	John Cryer (L)	Seat held
Lichfield	Conservative	Michael Fabricant (C)	Seat held
Lincoln	Conservative	Karl McCartney (C)	Seat held
Linlithgow and East Falkirk	Labour	Martyn Day (SNP)	Seat gain, defeated incumbent Michael Connarty
Liverpool Riverside	Labour Co-operative	Louise Ellman (L Co-op)	Seat held
Liverpool Walton	Labour	Steve Rotheram (L)	Seat held
Liverpool Wavertree	Labour Co-operative	Luciana Berger (L Co-op)	Seat held
Liverpool West Derby	Labour Co-operative	Stephen Twigg (L Co-op)	Seat held
Livingston	Labour	Hannah Bardell (SNP)	Seat gain, defeated incumbent Graeme Morrice
Llanelli	Labour	Nia Griffith (L)	Seat held
Loughborough	Conservative	Nicky Morgan (C)	Seat held
Louth and Horncastle	Conservative	Victoria Atkins (C)	Seat held, incumbent Sir Peter Tapsell stood down
Ludlow	Conservative	Philip Dunne (C)	Seat held
Luton North	Labour	Kelvin Hopkins (L)	Seat held
Luton South	Labour Co-operative	Gavin Shuker (L Co-op)	Seat held
Macclesfield	Conservative	David Rutley (C)	Seat held
Maidenhead	Conservative	Theresa May (C)	Seat held
Maidstone and The Weald	Conservative	Helen Grant (C)	Seat held
Makerfield	Labour	Yvonne Fovargue (L)	Seat held
Maldon	Conservative	John Whittingdale (C)	Seat held
Manchester Central	Labour Co-operative	Lucy Powell (L Co-op)	Seat held
Manchester, Gorton	Labour	Sir Gerald Kaufman (L)	Seat held
Manchester Withington	Liberal Democrats	Jeff Smith (L)	Seat gain, defeated incumbent John Leech
Mansfield	Labour	Sir Alan Meale (L)	Seat held
Meon Valley	Conservative	George Hollingbery (C)	Seat held
Meriden	Conservative	Caroline Spelman (C)	Seat held
Merthyr Tydfil and Rhymney	Labour	Gerald Jones (L)	Seat held, incumbent Dai Havard stood down
Mid Bedfordshire	Conservative	Nadine Dorries (C)	Seat held
Mid Derbyshire	Conservative	Pauline Latham (C)	Seat held
Mid Dorset and North Poole	Liberal Democrats	Michael Tomlinson (C)	Seat gain, incumbent Annette Brooke stood down
Mid Norfolk	Conservative	George Freeman (C)	Seat held
Mid Sussex	Conservative	Sir Nicholas Soames (C)	Seat held
Mid Ulster	Sinn Féin	Francie Molloy (SF)	Seat held
Mid Worcestershire	Conservative	Nigel Huddleston (C)	Seat held, incumbent Sir Peter Luff stood down
Middlesbrough	Labour	Andy McDonald (L)	Seat held
Middlesbrough South and East Cleveland	Labour	Tom Blenkinsop (L)	Seat held
Midlothian	Labour	Owen Thompson (SNP)	Seat gain, incumbent David Hamilton stood down
Milton Keynes North	Conservative	Mark Lancaster (C)	Seat held
Milton Keynes South	Conservative	Iain Stewart (C)	Seat held
Mitcham and Morden	Labour	Siobhain McDonagh (L)	Seat held
Mole Valley	Conservative	Sir Paul Beresford (C)	Seat held
Monmouth	Conservative	David Davies (C)	Seat held
Montgomeryshire	Conservative	Glyn Davies (C)	Seat held
Moray	SNP	Angus Robertson (SNP)	Seat held
Morecambe and Lunesdale	Conservative	David Morris (C)	Seat held
Morley and Outwood	Labour Co-operative	Andrea Jenkyns (C)	Seat gain, defeated incumbent Ed Balls
Motherwell and Wishaw	Labour	Marion Fellows (SNP)	Seat gain, defeated incumbent Frank Roy
Na h-Eileanan an Iar (Western Isles)	SNP	Angus MacNeil (SNP)	Seat held
Neath	Labour	Christina Rees (L)	Seat held, incumbent Peter Hain stood down
New Forest East	Conservative	Julian Lewis (C)	Seat held
New Forest West	Conservative	Desmond Swayne (C)	Seat held
Newark	Conservative	Robert Jenrick (C)	Seat held
Newbury	Conservative	Richard Benyon (C)	Seat held
Newcastle upon Tyne Central	Labour	Chinyelu Onwurah (L)	Seat held
Newcastle upon Tyne East	Labour	Nick Brown (L)	Seat held
Newcastle upon Tyne North	Labour	Catherine McKinnell (L)	Seat held
Newcastle-under-Lyme	Labour	Paul Farrelly (L)	Seat held
Newport East	Labour	Jessica Morden (L)	Seat held
Newport West	Labour	Paul Flynn (L)	Seat held
Newry and Armagh	Sinn Féin	Mickey Brady (SF)	Seat held, incumbent Conor Murphy stood down
Newton Abbot	Conservative	Anne Marie Morris (C)	Seat held
Normanton, Pontefract and Castleford	Labour	Yvette Cooper (L)	Seat held
North Antrim	DUP	The Hon. Ian Paisley Jr (DUP)	Seat held
North Ayrshire and Arran	Labour	Patricia Gibson (SNP)	Seat gain, defeated incumbent Katy Clark
North Cornwall	Liberal Democrats	Scott Mann (C)	Seat gain, defeated incumbent Dan Rogerson
North Devon	Liberal Democrats	Peter Heaton-Jones (C)	Seat gain, defeated incumbent Sir Nick Harvey
North Dorset	Conservative	Simon Hoare (C)	Seat held, incumbent Robert Walter stood down
North Down	Independent Unionist	Sylvia, Lady Hermon (Ind)	Seat held
North Durham	Labour	Kevan Jones (L)	Seat held
North East Bedfordshire	Conservative	Alistair Burt (C)	Seat held
North East Cambridgeshire	Conservative	Steve Barclay (C)	Seat held
North East Derbyshire	Labour	Natascha Engel (L)	Seat held
North East Fife	Liberal Democrats	Stephen Gethins (SNP)	Seat gain, incumbent Sir Menzies Campbell stood down
North East Hampshire	Conservative	Ranil Jayawardena (C)	Seat held, incumbent James Arbuthnot stood down
North East Hertfordshire	Conservative	Sir Oliver Heald (C)	Seat held
North East Somerset	Conservative	The Hon. Jacob Rees-Mogg (C)	Seat held
North Herefordshire	Conservative	Bill Wiggin (C)	Seat held
North Norfolk	Liberal Democrats	Norman Lamb (LD)	Seat held
North Shropshire	Conservative	Owen Paterson (C)	Seat held
North Somerset	Conservative	Liam Fox (C)	Seat held
North Swindon	Conservative	Justin Tomlinson (C)	Seat held
North Thanet	Conservative	Sir Roger Gale (C)	Seat held
North Tyneside	Labour	Mary Glindon (L)	Seat held
North Warwickshire	Conservative	Craig Tracey (C)	Seat held, incumbent Dan Byles stood down
North West Cambridgeshire	Conservative	Shailesh Vara (C)	Seat held
North West Durham	Labour	Pat Glass (L)	Seat held
North West Hampshire	Conservative	Kit Malthouse (C)	Seat held, incumbent Sir George Young, Bt stood down
North West Leicestershire	Conservative	Andrew Bridgen (C)	Seat held
North West Norfolk	Conservative	Henry Bellingham (C)	Seat held
North Wiltshire	Conservative	James Gray (C)	Seat held
Northampton North	Conservative	Michael Ellis (C)	Seat held
Northampton South	Conservative	David Mackintosh (C)	Seat held, incumbent Brian Binley stood down
Norwich North	Conservative	Chloe Smith (C)	Seat held
Norwich South	Liberal Democrats	Clive Lewis (L)	Seat gain, defeated incumbent Simon Wright
Nottingham East	Labour Co-operative	Chris Leslie (L Co-op)	Seat held
Nottingham North	Labour	Graham Allen (L)	Seat held
Nottingham South	Labour	Lilian Greenwood (L)	Seat held
Nuneaton	Conservative	Marcus Jones (C)	Seat held
Ochil and South Perthshire	Labour	Tasmina Ahmed-Sheikh (SNP)	Seat gain, defeated incumbent Gordon Banks
Ogmore	Labour	Huw Irranca-Davies (L)	Seat held
Old Bexley and Sidcup	Conservative	James Brokenshire (C)	Seat held
Oldham East and Saddleworth	Labour	Debbie Abrahams (L)	Seat held
Oldham West and Royton	Labour	Michael Meacher (L)	Seat held
Orkney and Shetland	Liberal Democrats	Alistair Carmichael (LD)	Seat held
Orpington	Conservative	Jo Johnson (C)	Seat held
Oxford East	Labour	Andrew Smith (L)	Seat held
Oxford West and Abingdon	Conservative	Nicola Blackwood (C)	Seat held
Paisley and Renfrewshire North	Labour	Gavin Newlands (SNP)	Seat gain, defeated incumbent Jim Sheridan
Paisley and Renfrewshire South	Labour	Mhairi Black (SNP)	Seat gain, defeated incumbent Douglas Alexander
Pendle	Conservative	Andrew Stephenson (C)	Seat held
Penistone and Stocksbridge	Labour	Angela Smith (L)	Seat held
Penrith and The Border	Conservative	Rory Stewart (C)	Seat held
Perth and North Perthshire	SNP	Pete Wishart (SNP)	Seat held
Peterborough	Conservative	Stewart Jackson (C)	Seat held
Plymouth, Moor View	Labour	Johnny Mercer (C)	Seat gain, defeated incumbent Alison Seabeck
Plymouth, Sutton and Devonport	Conservative	Oliver Colvile (C)	Seat held
Pontypridd	Labour	Owen Smith (L)	Seat held
Poole	Conservative	Robert Syms (C)	Seat held
Poplar and Limehouse	Labour	Jim Fitzpatrick (L)	Seat held
Portsmouth North	Conservative	Penny Mordaunt (C)	Seat held
Portsmouth South	Independent	Flick Drummond (C)	Seat gain, defeated incumbent Mike Hancock (originally a Liberal Democrat MP)
Preseli Pembrokeshire	Conservative	Stephen Crabb (C)	Seat held
Preston	Labour Co-operative	Mark Hendrick (L Co-op)	Seat held
Pudsey	Conservative	Stuart Andrew (C)	Seat held
Putney	Conservative	Justine Greening (C)	Seat held
Rayleigh and Wickford	Conservative	Mark Francois (C)	Seat held
Reading East	Conservative	Rob Wilson (C)	Seat held
Reading West	Conservative	Alok Sharma (C)	Seat held
Redcar	Liberal Democrats	Anna Turley (L Co-op)	Seat gain, incumbent Ian Swales stood down
Redditch	Conservative	Karen Lumley (C)	Seat held
Reigate	Conservative	Crispin Blunt (C)	Seat held
Rhondda	Labour	Chris Bryant (L)	Seat held
Ribble Valley	Conservative	Nigel Evans (C)	Seat held
Richmond (Yorks)	Conservative	Rishi Sunak (C)	Seat held, incumbent William Hague stood down
Richmond Park	Conservative	Zac Goldsmith (C)	Seat held
Rochdale	Labour	Simon Danczuk (L)	Seat held
Rochester and Strood	UKIP	Kelly Tolhurst (C)	Seat gain, defeated incumbent Mark Reckless
Rochford and Southend East	Conservative	James Duddridge (C)	Seat held
Romford	Conservative	Andrew Rosindell (C)	Seat held
Romsey and Southampton North	Conservative	Caroline Nokes (C)	Seat held
Ross, Skye and Lochaber	Liberal Democrats	Ian Blackford (SNP)	Seat gain, defeated incumbent Charles Kennedy
Rossendale and Darwen	Conservative	Jake Berry (C)	Seat held
Rother Valley	Labour	Sir Kevin Barron (L)	Seat held
Rotherham	Labour	Sarah Champion (L)	Seat held
Rugby	Conservative	Mark Pawsey (C)	Seat held
Ruislip, Northwood and Pinner	Conservative	The Hon. Nick Hurd (C)	Seat held
Runnymede and Weybridge	Conservative	Philip Hammond (C)	Seat held
Rushcliffe	Conservative	Kenneth Clarke (C)	Seat held
Rutherglen and Hamilton West	Labour Co-operative	Margaret Ferrier (SNP)	Seat gain, defeated incumbent Tom Greatrex
Rutland and Melton	Conservative	Sir Alan Duncan (C)	Seat held
Saffron Walden	Conservative	Sir Alan Haselhurst (C)	Seat held
Salford and Eccles	Labour	Rebecca Long-Bailey (L)	Seat held, incumbent Hazel Blears stood down
Salisbury	Conservative	John Glen (C)	Seat held
Scarborough and Whitby	Conservative	Robert Goodwill (C)	Seat held
Scunthorpe	Labour	Nic Dakin (L)	Seat held
Sedgefield	Labour	Phil Wilson (L)	Seat held
Sefton Central	Labour	Bill Esterson (L)	Seat held
Selby and Ainsty	Conservative	Nigel Adams (C)	Seat held
Sevenoaks	Conservative	Michael Fallon (C)	Seat held
Sheffield Central	Labour	Paul Blomfield (L)	Seat held
Sheffield South East	Labour	Clive Betts (L)	Seat held
Sheffield Brightside and Hillsborough	Labour	Harry Harpham (L)	Seat held, incumbent David Blunkett stood down
Sheffield Hallam	Liberal Democrats	Nick Clegg (LD)	Seat held
Sheffield Heeley	Labour Co-operative	Louise Haigh (L)	Seat held, incumbent Meg Munn stood down
Sherwood	Conservative	Mark Spencer (C)	Seat held
Shipley	Conservative	Philip Davies (C)	Seat held
Shrewsbury and Atcham	Conservative	Daniel Kawczynski (C)	Seat held
Sittingbourne and Sheppey	Conservative	Gordon Henderson (C)	Seat held
Skipton and Ripon	Conservative	Julian Smith (C)	Seat held
Sleaford and North Hykeham	Conservative	Stephen Phillips (C)	Seat held
Slough	Labour	Fiona Mactaggart (L)	Seat held
Solihull	Liberal Democrats	Julian Knight (C)	Seat gain, defeated incumbent Lorely Burt
Somerton and Frome	Liberal Democrats	David Warburton (C)	Seat gain, incumbent David Heath stood down
South Antrim	DUP	Danny Kinahan (UUP)	Seat gain, defeated incumbent William McCrea
South Basildon and East Thurrock	Conservative	Stephen Metcalfe (C)	Seat held
South Cambridgeshire	Conservative	Heidi Allen (C)	Seat held, incumbent Andrew Lansley stood down
South Derbyshire	Conservative	Heather Wheeler (C)	Seat held
South Dorset	Conservative	Richard Drax (C)	Seat held
South Down	SDLP	Margaret Ritchie (SDLP)	Seat held
South East Cambridgeshire	Conservative	Lucy Frazer (C)	Seat held, incumbent Sir James Paice stood down
South East Cornwall	Conservative	Sheryll Murray (C)	Seat held
South Holland and The Deepings	Conservative	John Hayes (C)	Seat held
South Leicestershire	Conservative	Alberto Costa (C)	Seat held, incumbent Andrew Robathan stood down
South Norfolk	Conservative	Richard Bacon (C)	Seat held
South Northamptonshire	Conservative	Andrea Leadsom (C)	Seat held
South Ribble	Conservative	Seema Kennedy (C)	Seat held, incumbent Lorraine Fullbrook stood down
South Shields	Labour	Emma Lewell-Buck (L)	Seat held
South Staffordshire	Conservative	Gavin Williamson (C)	Seat held
South Suffolk	Conservative	James Cartlidge (C)	Seat held, incumbent Tim Yeo stood down
South Swindon	Conservative	Robert Buckland (C)	Seat held
South Thanet	Conservative	Craig Mackinlay (C)	Seat held, incumbent Laura Sandys stood down
South West Bedfordshire	Conservative	Andrew Selous (C)	Seat held
South West Devon	Conservative	Gary Streeter (C)	Seat held
South West Hertfordshire	Conservative	David Gauke (C)	Seat held
South West Norfolk	Conservative	Liz Truss (C)	Seat held
South West Surrey	Conservative	Jeremy Hunt (C)	Seat held
South West Wiltshire	Conservative	Andrew Murrison (C)	Seat held
Southampton Itchen	Labour	Royston Smith (C)	Seat gain, incumbent John Denham stood down
Southampton Test	Labour	Alan Whitehead (L)	Seat held
Southend West	Conservative	Sir David Amess (C)	Seat held
Southport	Liberal Democrats	John Pugh (LD)	Seat held
Spelthorne	Conservative	Kwasi Kwarteng (C)	Seat held
St Albans	Conservative	Anne Main (C)	Seat held
St Austell and Newquay	Liberal Democrats	Steve Double (C)	Seat gain, defeated incumbent Steve Gilbert
St Helens North	Labour	Conor McGinn (L)	Seat held, incumbent David Watts stood down
St Helens South and Whiston	Labour	Marie Rimmer (L)	Seat held, incumbent Shaun Woodward stood down
St Ives	Liberal Democrats	Derek Thomas (C)	Seat gain, defeated incumbent Andrew George
Stafford	Conservative	Jeremy Lefroy (C)	Seat held
Staffordshire Moorlands	Conservative	Karen Bradley (C)	Seat held
Stalybridge and Hyde	Labour Co-operative	Jonathan Reynolds (L Co-op)	Seat held
Stevenage	Conservative	Stephen McPartland (C)	Seat held
Stirling	Labour	Steven Paterson (SNP)	Seat gain, incumbent Dame Anne McGuire stood down
Stockport	Labour	Ann Coffey (L)	Seat held
Stockton North	Labour	Alex Cunningham (L)	Seat held
Stockton South	Conservative	James Wharton (C)	Seat held
Stoke-on-Trent Central	Labour	The Hon. Tristram Hunt (L)	Seat held
Stoke-on-Trent North	Labour	Ruth Smeeth (L)	Seat held, incumbent Joan Walley stood down
Stoke-on-Trent South	Labour	Rob Flello (L)	Seat held
Stone	Conservative	Sir Bill Cash (C)	Seat held
Stourbridge	Conservative	Margot James (C)	Seat held
Strangford	DUP	Jim Shannon (DUP)	Seat held
Stratford-on-Avon	Conservative	Nadhim Zahawi (C)	Seat held
Streatham	Labour	Chuka Umunna (L)	Seat held
Stretford and Urmston	Labour	Kate Green (L)	Seat held
Stroud	Conservative	Neil Carmichael (C)	Seat held
Suffolk Coastal	Conservative	Therese Coffey (C)	Seat held
Sunderland Central	Labour	Julie Elliott (L)	Seat held
Surrey Heath	Conservative	Michael Gove (C)	Seat held
Sutton and Cheam	Liberal Democrats	Paul Scully (C)	Seat gain, defeated incumbent Paul Burstow
Sutton Coldfield	Conservative	Andrew Mitchell (C)	Seat held
Swansea East	Labour	Carolyn Harris (L)	Seat held, incumbent Siân James stood down
Swansea West	Labour Co-operative	Geraint Davies (L Co-op)	Seat held
Tamworth	Conservative	Christopher Pincher (C)	Seat held
Tatton	Conservative	George Osborne (C)	Seat held
Taunton Deane	Liberal Democrats	Rebecca Pow (C)	Seat gain, incumbent Jeremy Browne stood down
Telford	Labour	Lucy Allan (C)	Seat gain, defeated incumbent David Wright
Tewkesbury	Conservative	Laurence Robertson (C)	Seat held
Thirsk and Malton	Conservative	Kevin Hollinrake (C)	Seat held, incumbent Anne McIntosh stood down
Thornbury and Yate	Liberal Democrats	Luke Hall (C)	Seat gain, defeated incumbent Steve Webb
Thurrock	Conservative	Jackie Doyle-Price (C)	Seat held
Tiverton and Honiton	Conservative	Neil Parish (C)	Seat held
Tonbridge and Malling	Conservative	Tom Tugendhat (C)	Seat held, incumbent Sir John Stanley stood down
Tooting	Labour	Sadiq Khan (L)	Seat held
Torbay	Liberal Democrats	Kevin Foster (C)	Seat gain, defeated incumbent Adrian Sanders
Torfaen	Labour	Nick Thomas-Symonds (L)	Seat held, incumbent Paul Murphy stood down.
Torridge and West Devon	Conservative	Geoffrey Cox (C)	Seat held
Totnes	Conservative	Sarah Wollaston (C)	Seat held
Tottenham	Labour	David Lammy (L)	Seat held
Truro and Falmouth	Conservative	Sarah Newton (C)	Seat held
Tunbridge Wells	Conservative	Greg Clark (C)	Seat held
Twickenham	Liberal Democrats	Tania Mathias (C)	Seat gain, defeated incumbent Vince Cable
Tynemouth	Labour	Alan Campbell (L)	Seat held
Upper Bann	DUP	David Simpson (DUP)	Seat held
Uxbridge and South Ruislip	Conservative	Boris Johnson (C)	Seat held, incumbent Sir John Randall stood down
Vale of Clwyd	Labour	James Davies (C)	Seat gain, defeated incumbent Chris Ruane
Vale of Glamorgan	Conservative	Alun Cairns (C)	Seat held
Vauxhall	Labour	Kate Hoey (L)	Seat held
Wakefield	Labour	Mary Creagh (L)	Seat held
Wallasey	Labour	Angela Eagle (L)	Seat held
Walsall North	Labour	David Winnick (L)	Seat held
Walsall South	Labour	Valerie Vaz (L)	Seat held
Walthamstow	Labour Co-operative	Stella Creasy (L Co-op)	Seat held
Wansbeck	Labour	Ian Lavery (L)	Seat held
Wantage	Conservative	The Hon. Ed Vaizey (C)	Seat held
Warley	Labour	John Spellar (L)	Seat held
Warrington North	Labour	Helen Jones (L)	Seat held
Warrington South	Conservative	David Mowat (C)	Seat held
Warwick and Leamington	Conservative	Chris White (C)	Seat held
Washington and Sunderland West	Labour	Sharon Hodgson (L)	Seat held
Watford	Conservative	Richard Harrington (C)	Seat held
Waveney	Conservative	Peter Aldous (C)	Seat held
Wealden	Conservative	Nus Ghani (C)	Seat held, incumbent Charles Hendry stood down
Weaver Vale	Conservative	Graham Evans (C)	Seat held
Wellingborough	Conservative	Peter Bone (C)	Seat held
Wells	Liberal Democrats	James Heappey (C)	Seat gain, defeated incumbent Tessa Munt
Welwyn Hatfield	Conservative	Grant Shapps (C)	Seat held
Wentworth and Dearne	Labour	John Healey (L)	Seat held
West Aberdeenshire and Kincardine	Liberal Democrats	Stuart Donaldson (SNP)	Seat gain, defeated incumbent Sir Robert Smith, Bt
West Bromwich East	Labour	Tom Watson (L)	Seat held
West Bromwich West	Labour Co-operative	Adrian Bailey (L Co-op)	Seat held
West Dorset	Conservative	Oliver Letwin (C)	Seat held
West Dunbartonshire	Labour Co-operative	Martin Docherty (SNP)	Seat gain, defeated incumbent Gemma Doyle
West Ham	Labour	Lyn Brown (L)	Seat held
West Lancashire	Labour	Rosie Cooper (L)	Seat held
West Suffolk	Conservative	Matthew Hancock (C)	Seat held
West Tyrone	Sinn Féin	Pat Doherty (SF)	Seat held
West Worcestershire	Conservative	Harriett Baldwin (C)	Seat held
Westminster North	Labour	Karen Buck (L)	Seat held
Westmorland and Lonsdale	Liberal Democrats	Tim Farron (LD)	Seat held
Weston-super-Mare	Conservative	John Penrose (C)	Seat held
Wigan	Labour	Lisa Nandy (L)	Seat held
Wimbledon	Conservative	Stephen Hammond (C)	Seat held
Winchester	Conservative	Steve Brine (C)	Seat held
Windsor	Conservative	Adam Afriyie (C)	Seat held
Wirral South	Labour	Alison McGovern (L)	Seat held
Wirral West	Conservative	Margaret Greenwood (L)	Seat gain, defeated incumbent Esther McVey
Witham	Conservative	Priti Patel (C)	Seat held
Witney	Conservative	David Cameron (C)	Seat held
Woking	Conservative	Jonathan Lord (C)	Seat held
Wokingham	Conservative	John Redwood (C)	Seat held
Wolverhampton North East	Labour	Emma Reynolds (L)	Seat held
Wolverhampton South East	Labour	Pat McFadden (L)	Seat held
Wolverhampton South West	Conservative	Rob Marris (L)	Seat gain, defeated incumbent Paul Uppal
Worcester	Conservative	The Hon. Robin Walker (C)	Seat held
Workington	Labour	Sue Hayman (L)	Seat held, incumbent Sir Tony Cunningham stood down
Worsley and Eccles South	Labour	Barbara Keeley (L)	Seat held
Worthing West	Conservative	Sir Peter Bottomley (C)	Seat held
The Wrekin	Conservative	Mark Pritchard (C)	Seat held
Wrexham	Labour	Ian Lucas (L)	Seat held
Wycombe	Conservative	Steve Baker (C)	Seat held
Wyre and Preston North	Conservative	Ben Wallace (C)	Seat held
Wyre Forest	Conservative	Mark Garnier (C)	Seat held
Wythenshawe and Sale East	Labour	Mike Kane (L)	Seat held
Yeovil	Liberal Democrats	Marcus Fysh (C)	Seat gain, defeated incumbent David Laws
Ynys Môn (Anglesey)	Labour	Albert Owen (L)	Seat held
York Central	Labour	Rachael Maskell (L Co-op)	Seat held, incumbent Sir Hugh Bayley stood down
York Outer	Conservative	Julian Sturdy (C)	Seat held

== Changes and by-elections ==
After the general election, changes can occur in the composition of the House of Commons. This happens as a result of the election of Deputy Speakers, by-elections, defections, suspensions or removal of whip.

After the swearing in of MPs and the elections of the Speaker and the Deputy Speakers, the initial government majority was calculated to be sixteen.

Technically, MPs cannot resign. However, they can effectively do so by requesting to be appointed as the Crown Steward and Bailiff of the Manor of Northstead or the Crown Steward and Bailiff of the three Chiltern Hundreds of Stoke, Desborough and Burnham, which vacates their seat.

The net outcome of all changes over the course of the Parliament had resulted in two fewer Labour MPs, two fewer SNP MPs, one more Liberal Democrat MP and three more independent MPs.

=== Deputy Speakers ===
In accordance with a decision taken by the House of Commons on the final day of its sitting in the previous Parliament, the Speaker appointed two members to serve as Temporary Deputy Speakers until the Deputy Speakers had been elected. Directly after the 2015 State Opening of Parliament, the Speaker nominated Sir Roger Gale (Conservative, North Thanet) and George Howarth (Labour, Knowsley) for these positions.

The election of Deputy Speakers took place on 3 June 2015.

Although Deputy Speakers do not resign from their parties, they cease to vote (except to break ties) and they do not participate in party-political activity until the next election.

Name	Party	Constituency	Office
Lindsay Hoyle	Labour	Chorley	Chairman of Ways and Means
Eleanor Laing	Conservative	Epping Forest	First Deputy Chairman of Ways and Means
Natascha Engel	Labour	North East Derbyshire	Second Deputy Chairman of Ways and Means

=== By-elections ===
By-elections are held for seats that become vacant.

#	Constituency	Incumbent				Date of by-election	Winner		By-election
#	Constituency	Name	Party	Date seat vacated	Cause of vacation	Date of by-election	Name	Party	By-election
1	Oldham West and Royton	Michael Meacher	Labour	21 October 2015	Death	3 December 2015	Jim McMahon	Labour Co-op	Details
2	Sheffield Brightside and Hillsborough	Harry Harpham	Labour	4 February 2016	Death	5 May 2016	Gill Furniss	Labour	Details
3	Ogmore	Huw Irranca-Davies	Labour	23 March 2016	Resignation	5 May 2016	Chris Elmore	Labour	Details
4	Tooting	Sadiq Khan	Labour	9 May 2016	Resignation	16 June 2016	Rosena Allin-Khan	Labour	Details
5	Batley and Spen	Jo Cox	Labour	16 June 2016	Assassination	20 October 2016	Tracy Brabin	Labour Co-op	Details
6	Witney	David Cameron	Conservative	12 September 2016	Resignation	20 October 2016	Robert Courts	Conservative	Details
7	Richmond Park	Zac Goldsmith	Conservative	25 October 2016	Resignation	1 December 2016	Sarah Olney	Liberal Democrats	Details
8	Sleaford and North Hykeham	Stephen Phillips	Conservative	4 November 2016	Resignation	8 December 2016	Caroline Johnson	Conservative	Details
9	Copeland	Jamie Reed	Labour	23 January 2017	Resignation	23 February 2017	Trudy Harrison	Conservative	Details
10	Stoke-on-Trent Central	Tristram Hunt	Labour	23 January 2017	Resignation	23 February 2017	Gareth Snell	Labour Co-op	Details

A by-election was planned to be held in the seat of Manchester Gorton following the death of Sir Gerald Kaufman on 26 February 2017. Following the announcement on 18 April 2017 of a snap general election by Theresa May, it was confirmed that the Cabinet Office would intervene to cancel the by-election, leaving the seat vacant until the general election on 8 June 2017.

=== Defections, suspensions and removal of whip ===
In some situations, the label under which MPs sit in the House of Commons can change. When this happens, MPs often become independents.

Name	Date	From	To	Constituency	Reason
Michelle Thomson	29 September 2015	SNP	Independent	Edinburgh West	Resigned the SNP whip after her business became the subject of a police investigation into alleged irregularities regarding property deals.
Natalie McGarry	24 November 2015	SNP	Independent	Glasgow East	Resigned the SNP whip after police investigation over financial discrepancies within Women for Independence, an organisation of which she is a founder.
Simon Danczuk	31 December 2015	Labour	Independent	Rochdale	Suspended from Labour after allegations of "inappropriate behaviour" with a 17-year-old girl.
Naz Shah	27 April 2016	Labour	Independent	Bradford West	Suspended from Labour, pending investigation into social media comments which she made, including proposing the relocation of Israel to North America.
Naz Shah	5 July 2016	Independent	Labour	Bradford West	Reinstated.
Christina Rees	June 2016	Labour	Labour Co-op	Neath	Invited by the Co-operative Party NEC to join the Labour and Co-operative Parliamentary Group.
Justin Tomlinson	11 October 2016	Conservative	Suspended	North Swindon	Suspended from the House of Commons after leaking a confidential report to a Wonga.com employee.
Justin Tomlinson	12 October 2016	Suspended	Conservative	North Swindon	Reinstated.
Douglas Carswell	25 March 2017	UKIP	Independent	Clacton	Resigned from UKIP to focus on local issues as the UK was "certain to leave the EU".

== Progression of government majority and party totals ==
The government voting total is the total number of Conservative MPs, minus the Conservative Deputy Speaker. The opposition voting total is the total number of other MPs, minus the Speaker, the two Labour Deputy Speakers, and all Sinn Féin MPs. The majority is the difference between the former and the latter.

Date	Event	Cons.	Working majority	Labour	SNP	Lib Dem	DUP	Sinn F	PC	SDLP	UUP	Green	UKIP	Ind.	Spkr	Vacant
27 May 2015	Opening of Parliament	330	16	232	56	8	8	4	3	3	2	1	1	1	1	0
29 September 2015	Thomson suspended from SNP	330	16	232	55	8	8	4	3	3	2	1	1	2	1	0
21 October 2015	Meacher (Lab), dies	330	17	231	55	8	8	4	3	3	2	1	1	2	1	1
24 November 2015	McGarry suspended from SNP	330	17	231	54	8	8	4	3	3	2	1	1	3	1	1
3 December 2015	McMahon (Lab), elected in Oldham West and Royton	330	16	232	54	8	8	4	3	3	2	1	1	3	1	0
31 December 2015	Danczuk (Lab), has whip suspended	330	16	231	54	8	8	4	3	3	2	1	1	4	1	0
2016
4 February 2016	Harpham (Lab), dies	330	17	230	54	8	8	4	3	3	2	1	1	4	1	1
23 March 2016	Irranca-Davies (Lab), resigns .	330	18	229	54	8	8	4	3	3	2	1	1	4	1	2
27 April 2016	Shah (Lab), has whip suspended	330	18	228	54	8	8	4	3	3	2	1	1	5	1	2
5 May 2016	Lab wins Brightside & Ogmore by-elections	330	16	230	54	8	8	4	3	3	2	1	1	5	1	0
9 May 2016	Khan (Lab), resigns	330	17	229	54	8	8	4	3	3	2	1	1	5	1	1
16 June 2016	Lab wins Tooting by-election.	330	17	229	54	8	8	4	3	3	2	1	1	5	1	1
16 June 2016	Cox (Lab) killed.	330	17		54	8	8	4	3	3	2	1	1		1	1
5 July 2016	Shah re-admitted to Labour	330	17	230	54	8	8	4	3	3	2	1	1	4	1	1
12 September 2016	Cameron (Con), resigns	329	16	230	54	8	8	4	3	3	2	1	1	4	1	2
20 October 2016	Lab wins Batley, Con win Witney by-elections	330	16	231	54	8	8	4	3	3	2	1	1	4	1	0
25 October 2016	Goldsmith (Con) resigns	329	15	231	54	8	8	4	3	3	2	1	1	4	1	1
4 November 2016	Phillips (Con), resigns	328	14	231	54	8	8	4	3	3	2	1	1	4	1	2
1 December 2016	Olney (Lib Dem) wins Richmond Park by-election	328	13	231	54	9	8	4	3	3	2	1	1	4	1	1
8 December 2016	Johnson (Con) wins Sleaford by-election	329	14	231	54	9	8	4	3	3	2	1	1	4	1	0
2017
23 January 2017	Reed (Lab, Copeland) and Hunt (Lab, Stoke-on-Trent Central) resign.	329	16	229	54	9	8	4	3	3	2	1	1	4	1	2
23 February 2017	Lab wins Stoke, Con win Copeland by-elections	330	16	230	54	9	8	4	3	3	2	1	1	4	1	0
26 February 2017	Kaufman (Lab, Manchester Gorton) dies	330	17	229	54	9	8	4	3	3	2	1	1	4	1	1
25 March 2017	Carswell resigns from UKIP	330	17	229	54	9	8	4	3	3	2	1	0	5	1	1

== See also ==
- List of MPs for constituencies in England 2015–17
- List of MPs for constituencies in Scotland 2015–17
- List of MPs for constituencies in Northern Ireland 2015–17
- List of MPs for constituencies in Wales 2015–17
- List of United Kingdom MPs by seniority, 2015–17
- Category:UK MPs 2015–2017
