= List of MPs for constituencies in Scotland (2015–2017) =

- Colours on map indicate the party allegiance of each constituency's MP.

This is a list of the 59 members of Parliament (MPs) elected to the House of Commons of the United Kingdom by Scottish constituencies for the Fifty-Sixth Parliament of the United Kingdom (2015 to 2017) at the 2015 United Kingdom general election.

== Composition at election ==
Affiliation	Members
Scottish National Party	56
Scottish Labour Party	1
Scottish Conservative Party	1
Scottish Liberal Democrats	1
Total	59

== List ==
MP	Constituency	Party	Notes
Aberdeen North	Kirsty Blackman	SNP	
Aberdeen South	Callum McCaig	SNP	
Airdrie and Shotts	Neil Grey	SNP	
Angus	Mike Weir	SNP	
Argyll and Bute	Brendan O'Hara	SNP	
Ayr, Carrick and Cumnock	Corri Wilson	SNP	
Banff and Buchan	Eilidh Whiteford	SNP	
Berwickshire, Roxburgh and Selkirk	Calum Kerr	SNP	
Caithness, Sutherland and Easter Ross	Paul Monaghan	SNP	
Central Ayrshire	Philippa Whitford	SNP	
Coatbridge, Chryston and Bellshill	Phil Boswell	SNP	
Cumbernauld, Kilsyth and Kirkintilloch East	Stuart McDonald	SNP	
Dumfries and Galloway	Richard Arkless	SNP	
Dumfriesshire, Clydesdale and Tweeddale	David Mundell	Conservative	
Dundee East	Stewart Hosie	SNP	
Dundee West	Chris Law	SNP	
Dunfermline and West Fife	Douglas Chapman	SNP	
East Dumbartonshire	John Nicolson	SNP	
East Kilbride, Strathaven and Lesmahagow	Lisa Cameron	SNP	
East Lothian	George Kerevan	SNP	
East Renfrewshire	Kirsten Oswald	SNP	
Edinburgh East	Tommy Sheppard	SNP	
Edinburgh North and Leith	Deirdre Brock	SNP	
Edinburgh South	Ian Murray	Labour	
Edinburgh South West	Joanna Cherry	SNP	
Edinburgh West	Michelle Thomson	SNP	
Falkirk	John McNally	SNP	
Glasgow Central	Alison Thewliss	SNP	
Glasgow East	Natalie McGarry	SNP	
Glasgow North	Patrick Grady	SNP	
Glasgow North East	Anne Mclaughlin	SNP	
Glasgow North West	Carol Monaghan	SNP	
Glasgow South	Stewart McDonald	SNP	
Glasgow South West	Chris Stephens	SNP	
Glenrothes	Peter Grant	SNP	
Gordon	Alex Salmond	SNP	
Inverclyde	Ronnie Cowan	SNP	
Inverness, Nairn, Badenoch and Strathspey	Drew Hendry	SNP	
Kilmarnock and Loudoun	Alan Brown	SNP	
Kirkcaldy and Cowdenbeath	Roger Mullin	SNP	
Lanark and Hamilton East	Angela Crawley	SNP	
Linlithgow and East Falkirk	Martyn Day	SNP	
Livingston	Hannah Bardell	SNP	
Midlothian	Owen Thompson	SNP	
Moray	Angus Robertson	SNP	
Motherwell and Wishaw	Marion Fellows	SNP	
Na h-Eileanan an Iar	Angus MacNeil	SNP	
North Ayrshire and Arran	Patricia Gibson	SNP	
North East Fife	Stephen Gethins	SNP	
Ochil and South Perthshire	Tasmina Ahmed-Sheikh	SNP	
Orkney and Shetland	Alistair Carmichael	Liberal Democrats	
Paisley and Renfrewshire North	Gavin Newlands	SNP	
Paisley and Renfrewshire South	Mhairi Black	SNP	
Perth and North Perthshire	Pete Wishart	SNP	
Ross, Skye and Lochaber	Ian Blackford	SNP	
Rutherglen and Hamilton West	Margaret Ferrier	SNP	
Stirling	Steven Paterson	SNP	
West Aberdeenshire and Kincardine	Stuart Donaldson	SNP	
West Dunbartonshire	Martin Docherty-Hughes	SNP	

== See also ==
- Lists of MPs for constituencies in Scotland
