= 2017 United Kingdom general election =

- 8 June 2017

All 650 seats in the House of Commons 326 (Note: Given that Sinn Féin members of Parliament (MPs) practise abstentionism and do not take their seats, while the Speaker and deputies do not vote, the number of MPs needed for a majority was in practice slightly lower. Sinn Féin won 7 seats, meaning a practical majority required 322 MPs.) seats needed for a majority
- Opinion polls
- Registered: 46,836,533
- Turnout: 32,204,184; 68.8% (▲2.4 pp)
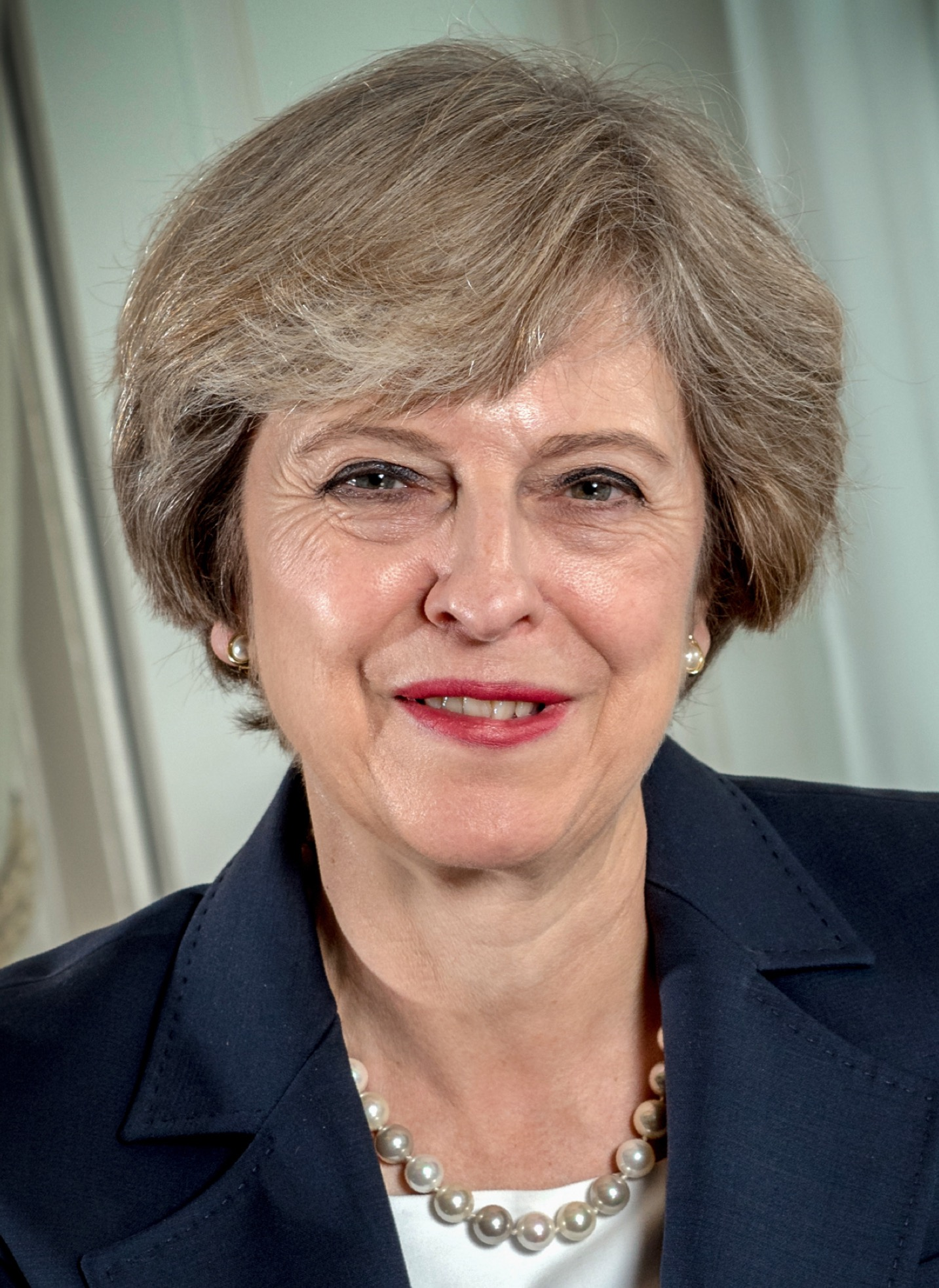

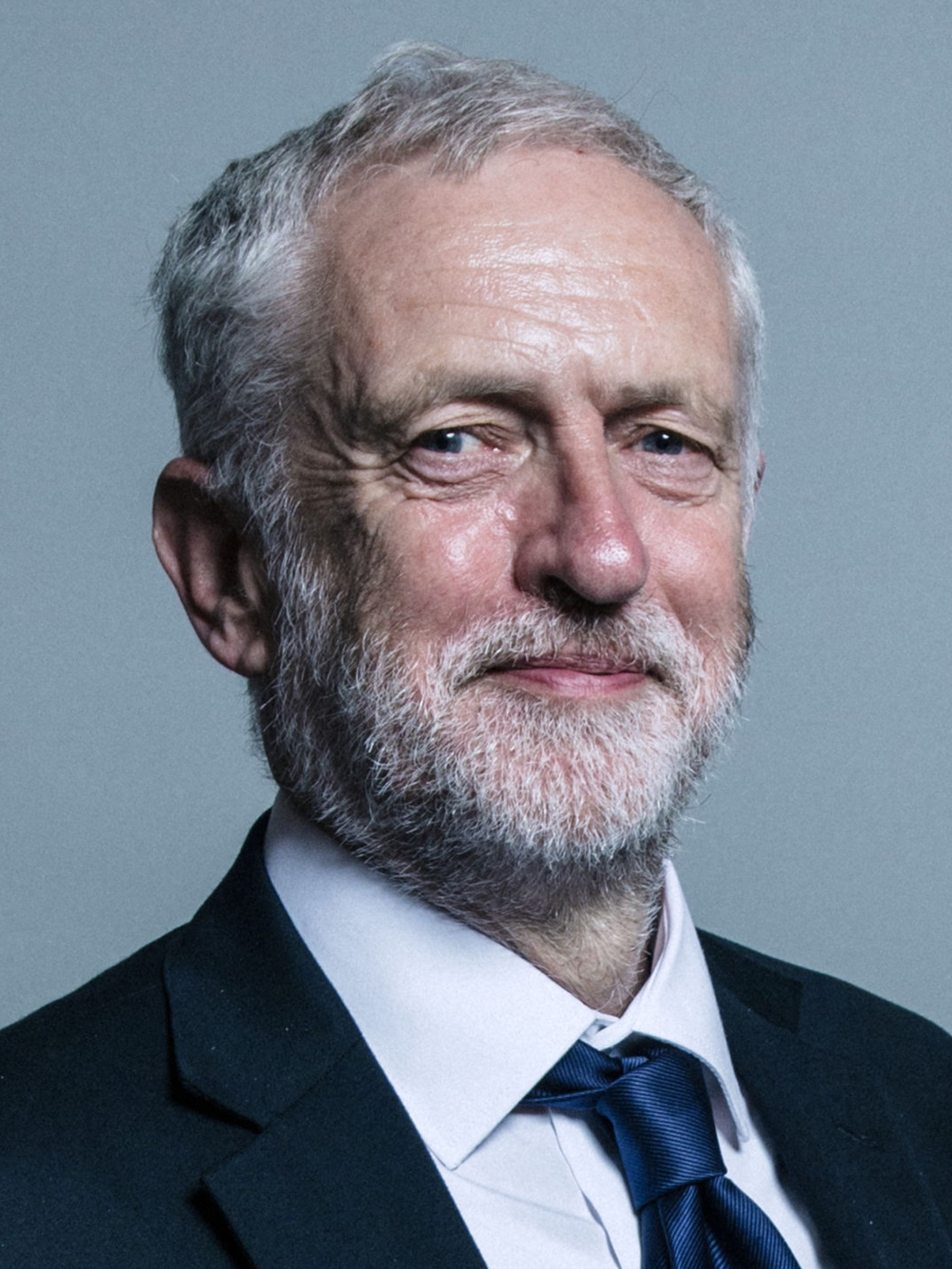

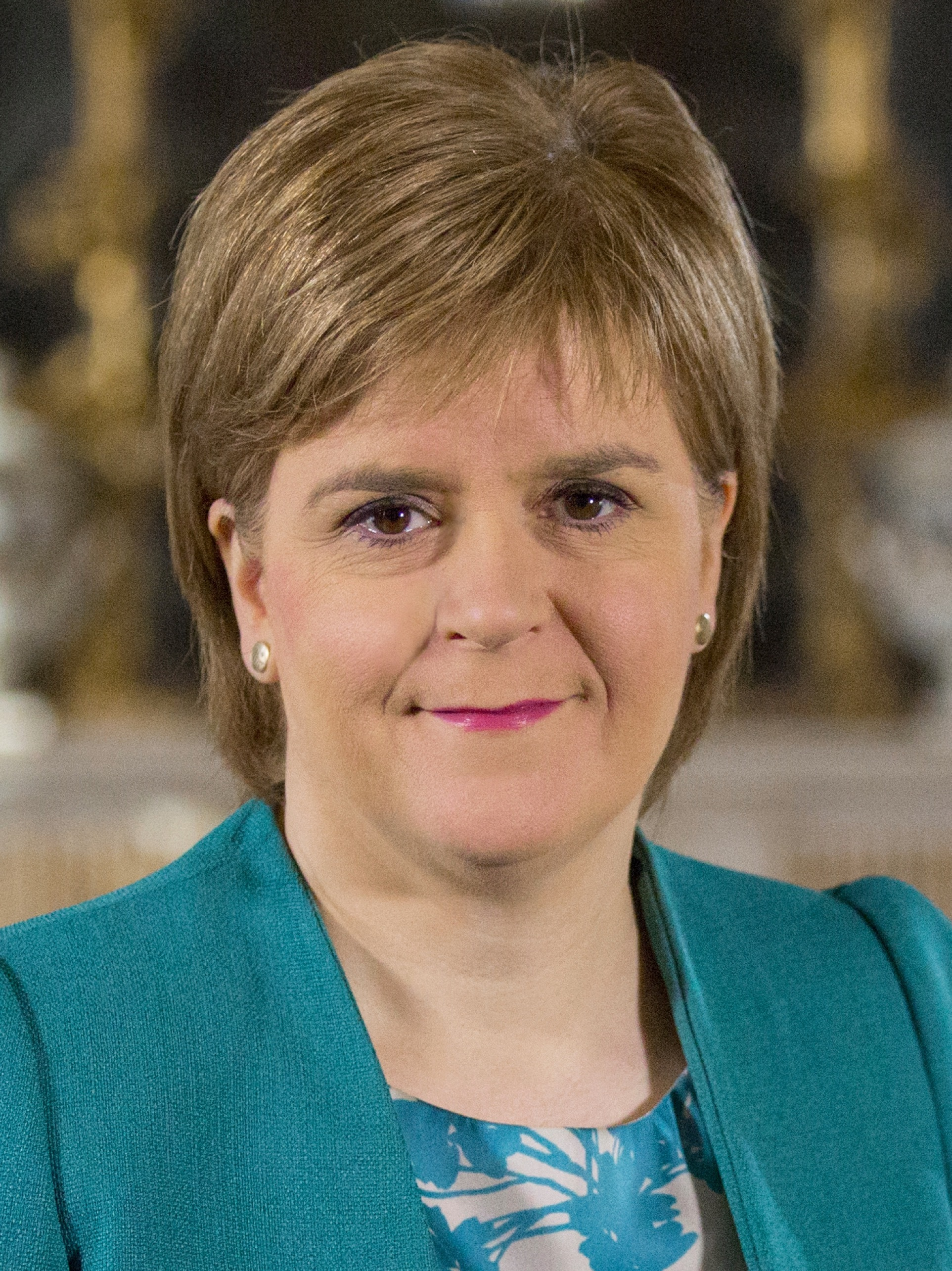

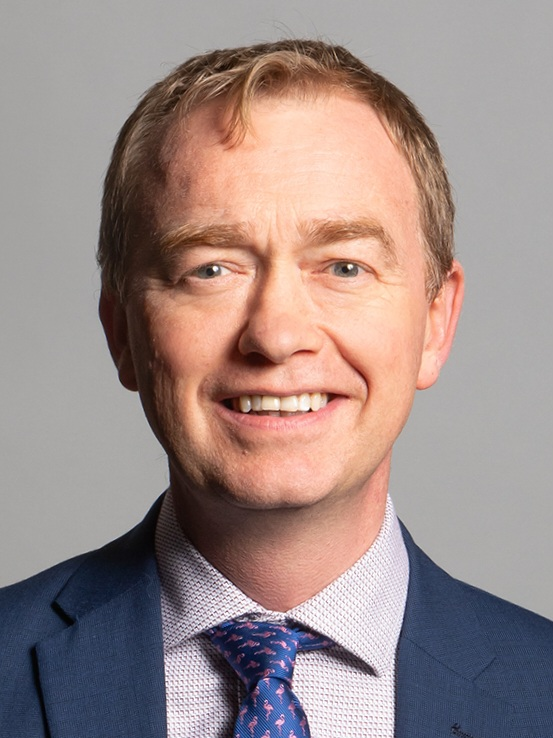

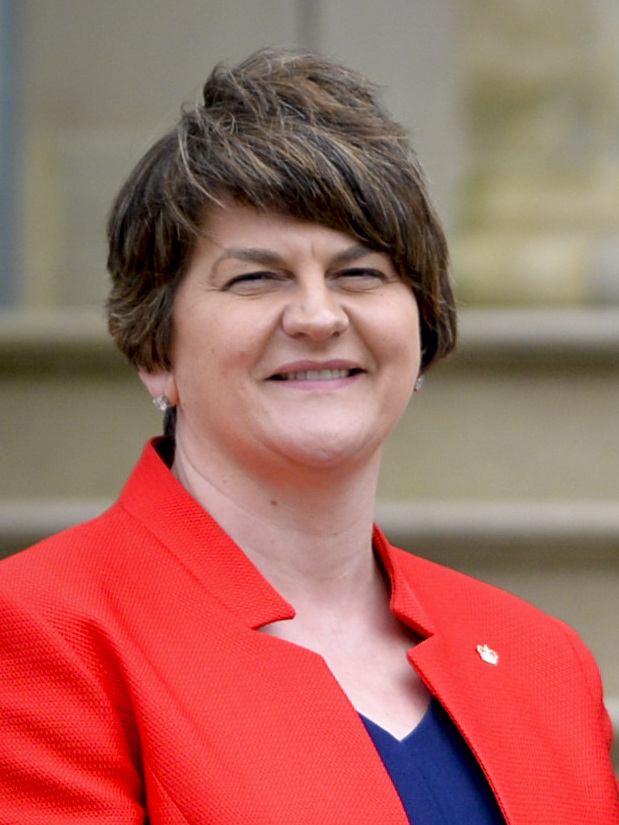

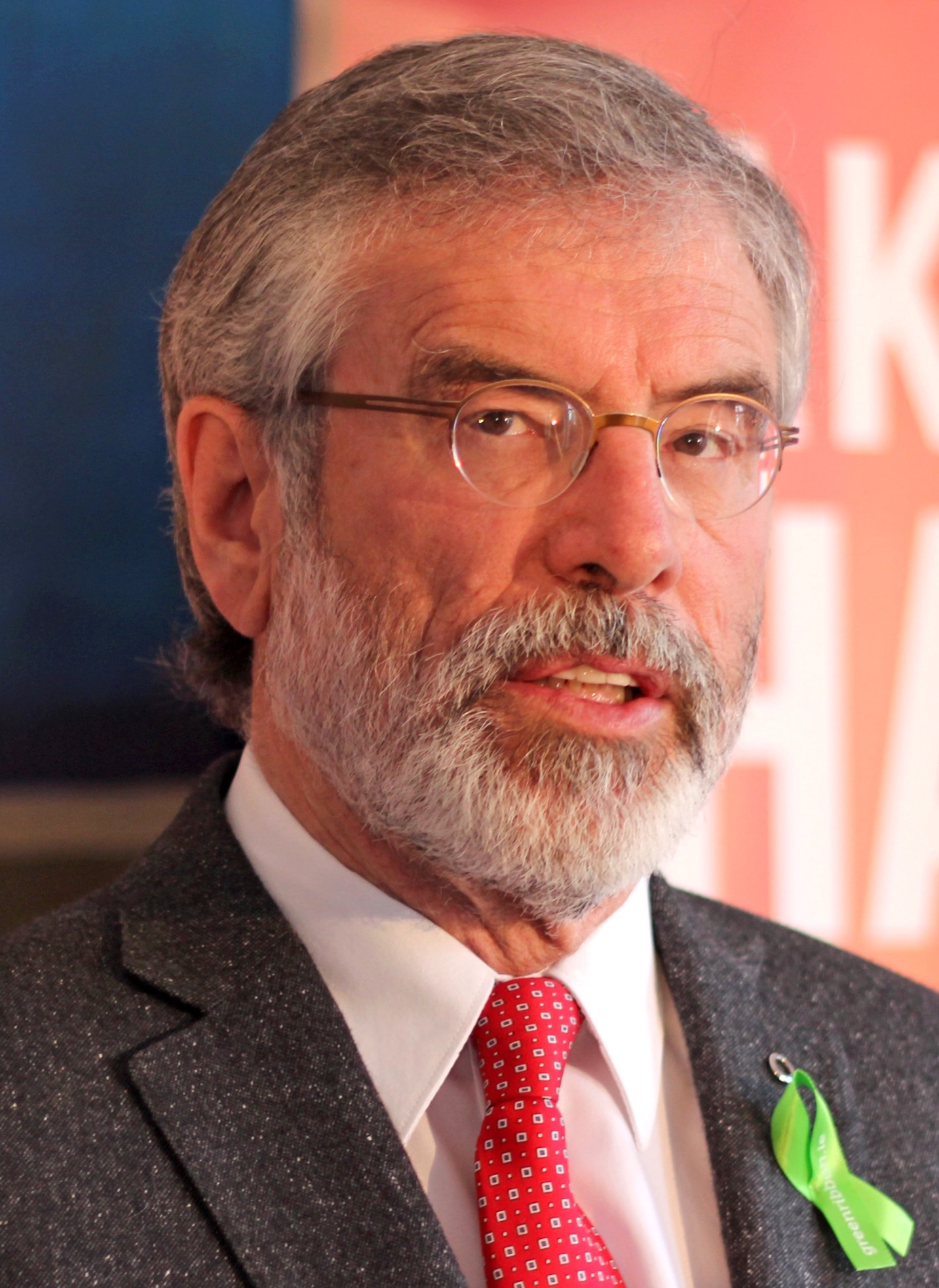
	First party	Second party	Third party
Leader	Theresa May	Jeremy Corbyn	Nicola Sturgeon
Party	Conservative	Labour	SNP
Leader since	11 July 2016	12 September 2015	14 November 2014
Leader's seat	Maidenhead	Islington North	Did not stand (Note: Nicola Sturgeon sat as an MSP in the Scottish Parliament for Glasgow Southside. Before the election, the SNP delegation to the House of Commons was led by Angus Robertson, MP for Moray, who lost his seat. Ian Blackford, MP for Ross, Skye and Lochaber, succeeded him.)
Last election	330 seats, 36.9%	232 seats, 30.4%	56 seats, 4.7%
Seats before	330	229	54
Seats won	317 (Note: Does not include the Speaker, John Bercow, who was included in the Conservative totals by some media outlets)	262	35
Seat change	▼13	▲30	▼21
Popular vote	13,636,684	12,877,918	977,568
Percentage	42.3%	40.0%	3.0%
Swing	▲5.4 pp	▲9.6 pp	▼1.7 pp
	Fourth party	Fifth party	Sixth party
Leader	Tim Farron	Arlene Foster	Gerry Adams (Note: Michelle O'Neill served as "Party Leader in the North". Adams served as President of Sinn Féin and served as the TD for Louth in the Dáil Éireann, the lower house in the Republic of Ireland. He has not contested a seat in the House of Commons since the 2010 General Election.)
Party	Liberal Democrats	DUP	Sinn Féin
Leader since	16 July 2015	17 December 2015	13 November 1983
Leader's seat	Westmorland and Lonsdale	Did not stand (Note: Arlene Foster sat as an MLA in the Northern Ireland Assembly for Fermanagh and South Tyrone prior to the collapse of the Assembly. The party's leader in the Commons was Nigel Dodds, the MP for Belfast North.)	Did not stand (Note: Michelle O'Neill sat as a MLA in Dáil Éireann (lower house of the Northern Ireland Assembly) for Mid Ulster.)
Last election	8 seats, 7.9%	8 seats, 0.6%	4 seats, 0.6%
Seats before	9	8	4
Seats won	12	10	7 (Note: Sinn Féin MPs abstain from taking their seats in the British House of Commons.)
Seat change	▲4	▲2	▲3
Popular vote	2,371,861	292,316	238,915
Percentage	7.4%	0.9%	0.7%
Swing	▼0.5 pp	▲0.3 pp	▲0.1 pp
- A map of UK parliamentary constituencies, with each winner's constituency, percentage of victory.

- Composition of the House of Commons after the election
Prime Minister before election
Theresa May
Conservative
Prime Minister after election
Theresa May
Conservative

A general election was held in the United Kingdom on 8 June 2017, two years after the previous general election in 2015; it was the first since 1992 to be held on a day that did not coincide with any local elections (2001's elections, local and general, were delayed by a month due to that year's foot-and-mouth outbreak). The governing Conservative Party led by Prime Minister Theresa May lost 13 seats, but remained in power as a minority government, commanding a working majority of 13 following a confidence and supply agreement with the Democratic Unionist Party.

The Conservative Party, which had governed as a senior coalition partner from 2010 and as a single-party majority government from 2015, was led by May as prime minister. It was defending a working majority of 17 seats against the opposition Labour Party led by Jeremy Corbyn. It was the first general election to be contested by either May or Corbyn as party leader; May had succeeded David Cameron following his resignation as prime minister the previous summer, while Corbyn had succeeded Ed Miliband after he resigned following Labour's failure to win the general election two years earlier.

Under the Fixed-term Parliaments Act 2011 an election had not been due until 1 May 2020, but Prime Minister May's call for a snap election was ratified by the necessary two-thirds vote in the House of Commons on 19 April 2017. May said that she hoped to secure a larger majority to "strengthen [her] hand" in the forthcoming Brexit negotiations.

Opinion polls had consistently shown strong leads for the Conservatives over Labour. From a 21-point lead, the Conservatives' lead began to diminish in the final weeks of the campaign. The Conservative Party returned 317 MPs—a net loss of 13 seats relative to 2015—despite winning 42.3% of the vote (its highest share of the vote since 1983), whereas the Labour Party made a net gain of 30 seats with 40.0% (its highest vote share since 2001 and its highest increase in vote share between two general elections since 1945). It was the first election since 1997 in which the Conservatives made a net loss of seats or Labour a net gain of seats. The election had the closest vote share result between the two major parties since February 1974 and resulted in their highest combined vote share since 1970. The Scottish National Party (SNP) and the Liberal Democrats, the third- and fourth-largest parties, both lost vote share; media coverage characterised the result as a return to two-party politics. The SNP, which had won 56 of the 59 Scottish seats at the previous general election in 2015, lost 21. The Liberal Democrats made a net gain of four seats. UKIP, the third-largest party in 2015 by number of votes, saw its share of the vote reduced from 12.6% to 1.8% and lost its only seat, Clacton.

In Wales, Plaid Cymru gained one seat, giving it a total of four seats. The Green Party retained its sole seat, but its share of the vote declined. In Northern Ireland, the DUP won 10 seats, Sinn Féin won seven, and Independent Unionist Sylvia Hermon retained her seat. The Social Democratic and Labour Party (SDLP) and Ulster Unionist Party (UUP) lost all their seats.

Negotiation positions following the UK's invocation of Article 50 of the Treaty on European Union in March 2017 to leave the EU were expected to feature significantly in the campaign, but did not as domestic issues took precedence instead. The campaign was interrupted by two major terrorist attacks: Manchester and London Bridge; thus, national security became a prominent issue in its final weeks.

The outcome of the election would have significant implications for the Brexit negotiations, and led the Parliament of the United Kingdom into a period of protracted deadlock which would eventually bring about the end of May's ministry, and the election of Boris Johnson as Prime Minister, who would go on to call another general election two and a half years later.

== Electoral system ==
Each parliamentary constituency of the United Kingdom elects one MP to the House of Commons using first-past-the-post voting. If one party obtains a majority of seats, then that party is entitled to form the Government, with its leader as Prime Minister. If the election results in no single party having a majority, there is a hung parliament. In this case, the options for forming the Government are either a minority government or a coalition.

The Sixth Periodic Review of Westminster constituencies was not due to report until 2018, and therefore this general election took place under existing boundaries, enabling direct comparisons with the results by constituency in 2015.

=== Voting eligibility ===
To vote in the general election, one had to be:

- on the Electoral Register;
- aged 18 or over on polling day;
- a British, Irish or Commonwealth citizen;
- a resident at an address in the UK (or a British citizen living abroad who has been registered to vote in the UK in the last 15 years), (Note: Or, in the case of a British citizen who moved abroad before the age of 18, if his/her parent/guardian was on the Electoral Register in the UK in the last 15 years) and;
- not legally excluded from voting (for example, a convicted person detained in prison or a mental hospital, or unlawfully at large if he/she would otherwise have been detained, or a person found guilty of certain corrupt or illegal practices) or disqualified from voting (peers sitting in the House of Lords, and the Queen).

Individuals had to be registered to vote by midnight twelve working days before polling day (22 May). Anyone who qualified as an anonymous elector had until midnight on 31 May to register. (Note: The deadline for the receipt and determination of anonymous electoral registration applications is one working day before the publication date of the notice of alteration to the Electoral Register (that is, the sixth working day before polling day).) A person who has two homes (such as a university student with a term-time address but lives at home during holidays) may be registered to vote at both addresses, as long as they are not in the same electoral area, but can vote in only one constituency at the general election.

On 18 May, The Independent reported that more than 1.1 million people between 18 and 35 had registered to vote since the election was announced on 18 April. Of those, 591,730 were under the age of 25.

== Date and cost of the election ==
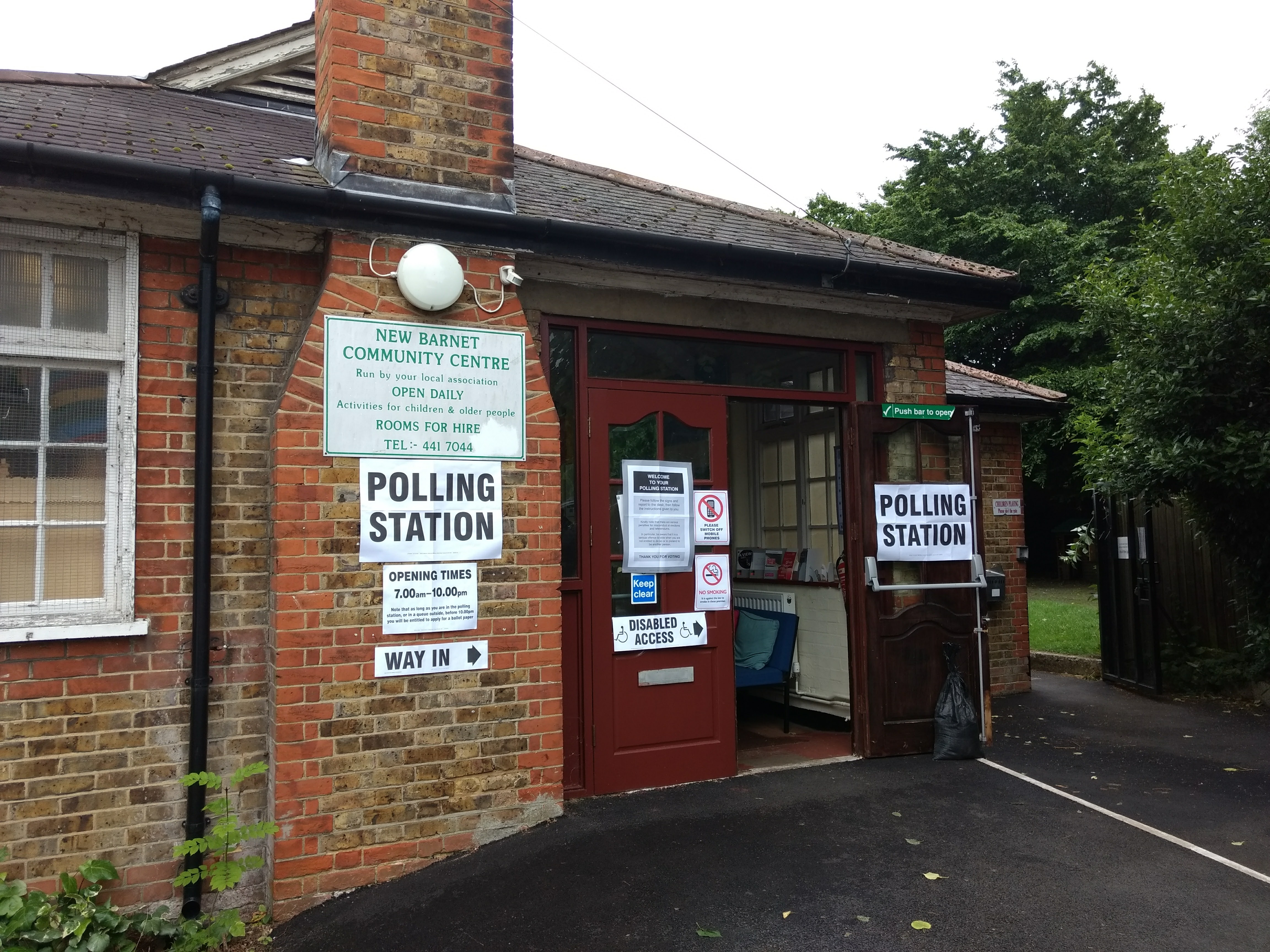
A polling station in north London

The Fixed-term Parliaments Act 2011 introduced fixed-term Parliaments to the United Kingdom, with elections scheduled every five years since the general election on 7 May 2015. This removed the power of the Prime Minister, using the royal prerogative, to dissolve Parliament before its five-year maximum length. The Act permitted early dissolution if the House of Commons voted by a supermajority of two-thirds of the entire membership of the House.

On 18 April 2017, Prime Minister Theresa May announced she would seek an election on 8 June, despite previously ruling out an early election. A House of Commons motion to allow this was passed on 19 April, with 522 votes for and 13 against, a majority of 509. The motion was supported by the Conservatives, Labour, the Liberal Democrats and the Greens, while the SNP abstained. Nine Labour MPs, one SDLP MP and three independents (Sylvia Hermon and two former SNP MPs, Natalie McGarry and Michelle Thomson) voted against the motion.

Labour leader Jeremy Corbyn supported the early election, as did Liberal Democrat leader Tim Farron and the Green Party. The SNP stated that it was in favour of fixed-term parliaments, and would abstain in the House of Commons vote. UKIP leader Paul Nuttall and First Minister of Wales Carwyn Jones criticised May for being opportunistic in the timing of the election, motivated by the strong position of the Conservative Party in the opinion polls.

On 25 April, the election date was confirmed as 8 June, with dissolution on 3 May. The government announced that it intended for the next parliament to assemble on 13 June, with the state opening on 19 June.

=== Timetable ===
The key dates are listed below (all times are BST):

18 April	Prime Minister Theresa May announced her intention to hold a snap election
19 April	MPs voted to dissolve Parliament
22 April	Start of pre-election period
25 April	Royal Proclamation under section 2(7) of the Fixed-term Parliaments Act 2011 issued by HM The Queen on the advice of the Prime Minister
27 April	Second session of Parliament prorogued
3 May	Formal dissolution of Parliament (for the election to take place on 8 June) and official start of 'short' campaigning
3 May	Royal Proclamation was issued summoning a new UK Parliament
4 May	Local elections (these were already scheduled, and were not part of the general election)
11 May	Deadline (4pm) for the delivery of candidate nomination papers
11 May	Deadline (5pm) for the publication of Statements of Persons Nominated (or 4 pm on 12 May if objections were received)
11 May	Earliest date returning officers could issue poll cards and postal ballot packs
22 May	Last day the public was able to register to vote (unless an anonymous elector)
23 May	Deadline (5pm) to apply for a postal vote/postal proxy vote
31 May	Deadline (5pm) to apply for a proxy vote, and last day to register to vote as an anonymous elector
8 June	Polling day (polling stations opened at 7 am and closed at 10 pm, or once voters present in a queue at or outside the polling station at 10 pm had cast their vote). Counting of votes started no later than 2 am on 9 June.
13 June	First meeting of the 57th Parliament of the United Kingdom, for the formal election of a Speaker of the Commons and the swearing-in of members, ahead of the State Opening of the new Parliament's first session.
21 June	State Opening of Parliament (initially planned for 19 June)

=== Cost ===
The cost of organising the election was around £140 million – slightly less than the EU referendum, of which £98 million was spent on administrative costs, and £42.5 million was spent on campaign costs.

== Parties and candidates ==
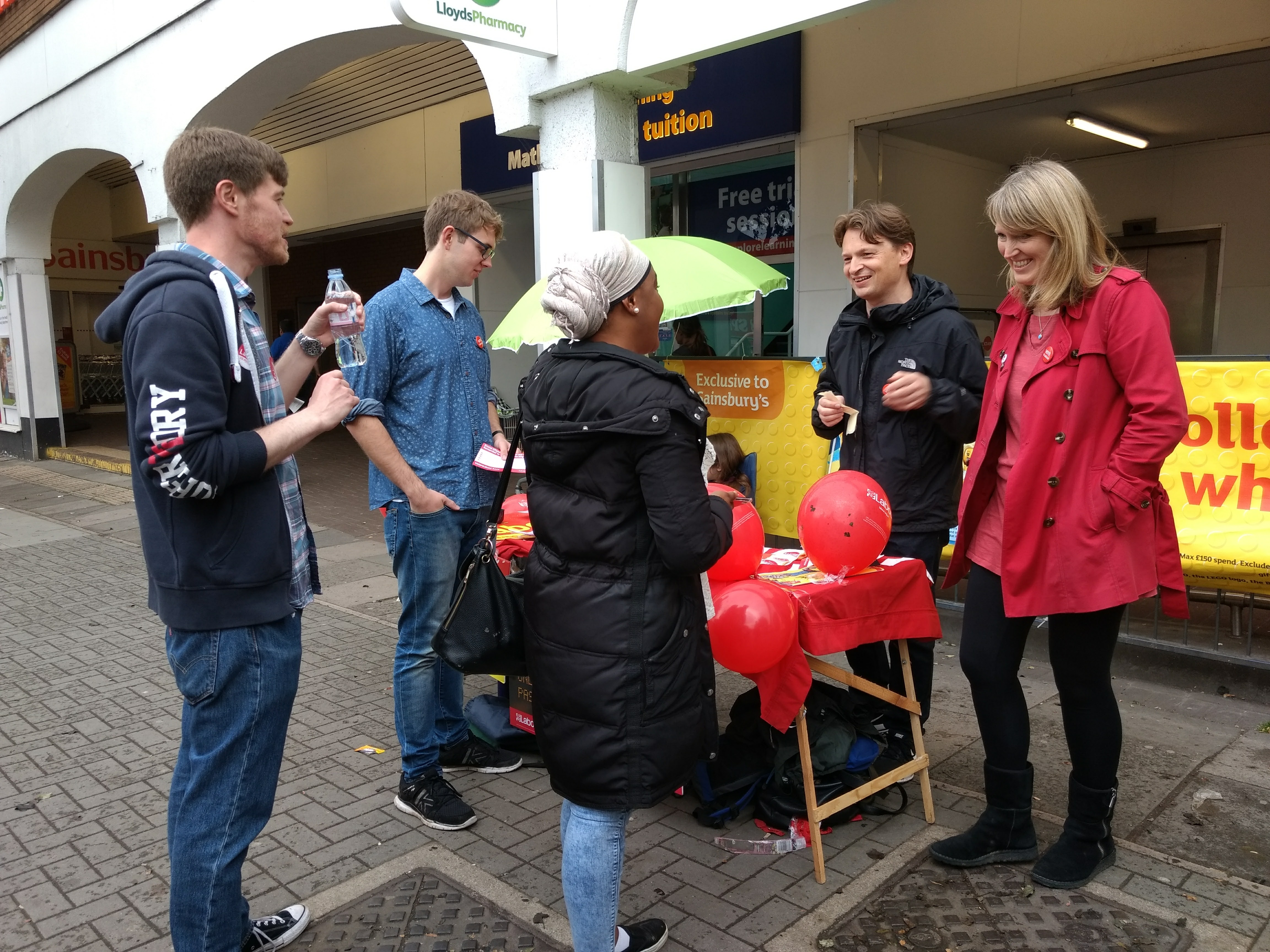
Campaigning on polling day, 8 June 2017

Most candidates were representatives of a political party registered with the Electoral Commission. Candidates not belonging to a registered party could use an "independent" label, or no label at all.

The leader of the party commanding a majority of support in the House of Commons is the person who is called on by the monarch to form a government as Prime Minister, while the leader of the largest party not in government becomes the Leader of the Opposition. Other parties also form shadow ministerial teams. The leaders of the SNP, Plaid Cymru and the DUP are not MPs; hence, they appoint separate leaders in the House of Commons.

=== Great Britain ===
The Conservative Party and the Labour Party have been the two biggest parties since 1922, and have supplied all Prime Ministers since 1922. Both parties changed their leader after the 2015 election. David Cameron, who had been the leader of the Conservative Party since 2005 and Prime Minister since 2010, was replaced in July 2016 by Theresa May following the referendum on the United Kingdom's membership of the European Union. Jeremy Corbyn replaced Ed Miliband as Leader of the Labour Party and Leader of the Opposition in September 2015, and was re-elected leader in September 2016.

While the Liberal Democrats and their predecessors had long been the third-largest party in British politics, they returned only 8 MPs in 2015 (having been part of the Conservative-Liberal Democrat coalition from 2010 until 2015)—49 fewer than at the previous election and the fewest in their modern history. (Note: I.e. the period following the 1988 merger of the Liberal Party and the Social Democratic Party.) Tim Farron became the Liberal Democrat leader in July 2015, following the resignation of Nick Clegg. Led by First Minister of Scotland Nicola Sturgeon, the SNP stands only in Scotland; it won 56 of the 59 Scottish seats in 2015. UKIP, then led by Nigel Farage, who was later replaced by Diane James and then by Paul Nuttall in 2016, won 12.7% of the vote in 2015 but gained only one MP, Douglas Carswell, who left the party in March 2017 to sit as an independent. After securing 3.8% of the vote and one MP in the previous general election, Green Party leader Natalie Bennett was succeeded by joint leaders Caroline Lucas and Jonathan Bartley in September 2016. Smaller parties that contested the 2015 election and chose not to put forward candidates in 2017 included Mebyon Kernow, the Communist Party of Britain, the Scottish Socialist Party, and the National Front. The Respect Party, which had previously held seats, was dissolved in 2016; its former MP George Galloway stood and lost in the 2017 election as an independent in Manchester Gorton.

=== Northern Ireland ===
In Northern Ireland, the Democratic Unionist Party (DUP), Sinn Féin, the Social Democratic and Labour Party (SDLP), the Ulster Unionist Party (UUP), the Green Party Northern Ireland and the Alliance Party contested the 2017 election. Sinn Féin maintained its abstentionist policy. The DUP, Sinn Féin, SDLP, UUP and APNI were all led by new party leaders, changed since the 2015 election. The Conservatives, Greens, and four other minor parties also stood. Despite contesting 10 seats last time, UKIP did not stand in Northern Ireland.

=== Candidates ===
3,304 candidates stood for election, down from 3,631 in the previous general election. The Conservatives stood in 637 seats, Labour in 631 (including jointly with the Co-operative Party in 50) and the Liberal Democrats in 629. UKIP stood in 377 constituencies, down from 624 in 2015, while the Greens stood in 468, down from 573. The SNP contested all 59 Scottish seats and Plaid Cymru stood in all 40 Welsh seats. In Great Britain, 183 candidates stood as independents; minor parties included the Christian Peoples Alliance which contested 31 seats, the Yorkshire Party which stood in 21, the Official Monster Raving Loony Party in 12, the British National Party in 10, the Pirate Party in 10, the English Democrats in 7, the Women's Equality Party in 7, the Social Democratic Party in 6, the National Health Action Party in 5 and the Workers Revolutionary Party in 5, while an additional 79 candidates stood for 46 other registered political parties.

In Wales, 213 candidates stood for election. Labour, Conservatives, Plaid Cymru, and Liberal Democrats contested all forty seats and there were 32 UKIP and 10 Green candidates. In Scotland, the SNP, the Conservatives, Labour and the Liberal Democrats stood in all 59 seats while UKIP contested 10 seats and the Greens only 3.

Of the 109 candidates in Northern Ireland, Sinn Féin, the SDLP and the Alliance contested all 18 seats; the DUP stood in 17, the UUP in 14 and the Conservatives and Greens stood in 7 each. People Before Profit and the Workers' Party contested two seats while Traditional Unionist Voice and the new Citizens Independent Social Thought Alliance stood in one each; four independents including incumbent Sylvia Hermon also stood.

==== Party selection processes ====
Unlike in previous elections, the timetable of the snap election required parties to select candidates in just under three weeks, to meet the 11 May deadline.

For the Conservatives, local associations in target seats were offered a choice of three candidates by the party's headquarters from an existing list of candidates, without inviting applications; candidates in non-target seats were to be appointed directly by central party offices; and successful MPs were to be confirmed by a meeting of their local parties. This was controversial with local associations. The Labour Party required sitting MPs to express their intention to stand, automatically re-selecting those who did; and it advertised for applications from party members for all remaining seats by 23 April. Having devolved selections to its Scottish and Welsh parties, Labour's National Executive Committee endorsed all parliamentary candidates on 3 May except for Rochdale, the seat of suspended MP Simon Danczuk. On 7 May, Steve Rotheram announced he was standing down as MP for Liverpool Walton following his election as Liverpool City Region mayor, leaving five days to appoint a candidate by close of nominations.

The SNP confirmed on 22 April that its 54 sitting MPs would be re-selected and that its suspended members Natalie McGarry and Michelle Thomson would not be nominated as SNP candidates; the party subsequently selected candidates for McGarry's and Thomson's former seats, as well as for the three Scottish constituencies it did not win in 2015. The Liberal Democrats had already selected 326 candidates in 2016 and over 70 in 2017 before the election was called. Meetings of local party members from UKIP, the Greens and Plaid Cymru selected their candidates. Parties in Northern Ireland were not believed to have already selected candidates due to the Assembly elections in March.

==== High-profile candidates ====
===== Conservative =====
Former employment minister Esther McVey was selected to contest Tatton. Zac Goldsmith was adopted as the candidate for Richmond Park, having lost the 2016 by-election as an independent in protest against the form of the Government's chosen expert's recommended Heathrow expansion. He had served as the seat's Conservative MP between 2010 and 2016. Kenneth Clarke, the Father of the House of Commons, had said he would retire in 2020 and so stood again in the 2017 election, leaving it open for him to retire possibly in 2022 (he eventually retired in 2019 when that year's national election was called).

===== Labour =====
Tony Lloyd, a former Labour MP for Manchester Central who served as Greater Manchester Police and Crime Commissioner from 2012 and interim Mayor of Greater Manchester since 2015 stood in Rochdale.

Eli Aldridge was just 18 years old when he challenged then Liberal Democrat leader Tim Farron in his Westmorland and Lonsdale constituency. News coverage showed Aldridge balancing campaigning with revision for his A-level examinations, even missing the start of his end-of-year ball to speak at a hustings in Kendal.

===== Liberal Democrats =====
Those ministers defeated in 2015 who stood for election in their former seats included Vince Cable in Twickenham, Ed Davey in Kingston and Surbiton, Jo Swinson in East Dunbartonshire, and Simon Hughes in Bermondsey and Old Southwark.

===== UKIP leader =====
After coming second in the Stoke-on-Trent Central by-election earlier in 2017, UKIP leader Paul Nuttall contested Boston and Skegness.

===== MPs rejected by their parties =====
Former Labour MP Simon Danczuk stood as an independent candidate, after being rejected from standing with that party and then withdrawing his party membership. After the Liberal Democrats rejected David Ward, the former MP for Bradford East, for Antisemitism, he contested that seat as an independent.

=== Electoral alliances and arrangements ===
Ahead of the general election, crowdfunding groups such as More United and Open Britain were formed to promote candidates of similar views standing for election, and a "progressive alliance" was proposed. Former UKIP donor Arron Banks suggested a "patriotic alliance" movement. The Tactical voting website designed to keep the Conservatives out of government (TacticalVote.co.uk) went viral on social media. Gina Miller, who took the government to court over Article 50, set out plans to tour marginal constituencies in support of pro-EU candidates.

Within a few days of the election being announced, the Green Party of England and Wales and the SNP each proposed to collaborate with Labour and the Liberal Democrats to prevent a Conservative majority government. Liberal Democrat leader Tim Farron quickly reaffirmed his party's opposition to an electoral pact or coalition with Labour, citing "electorally toxic" Corbyn and concerns over Labour's position on Brexit. On 22 April the Liberal Democrats also ruled out a coalition deal with the Conservatives and SNP. Labour ruled out an electoral pact with the SNP, Liberal Democrats and Greens.

Notwithstanding national arrangements, the Liberal Democrats, the Greens, and UKIP indicated they might not stand in every constituency. The Green Party of England and Wales chose not to contest 22 seats explicitly "to increase the chance of a progressive candidate beating the Conservatives", including South West Surrey, the seat of Health Secretary Jeremy Hunt, in favour of the National Health Action Party candidate. The Scottish Green Party contested just three constituencies. The Liberal Democrats agreed to stand down in Brighton Pavilion. After indicating it might not nominate candidates in seats held by strongly pro-Brexit Conservative MPs, UKIP nominated 377 candidates; it was suggested this would help the Conservatives in marginal seats.

In Northern Ireland, there were talks between the DUP and UUP. Rather than engaging in a formal pact, the DUP agreed not to contest Fermanagh and South Tyrone, while the UUP chose not to stand in four constituencies. Talks took place between Sinn Féin, the SDLP and the Green Party Northern Ireland about an anti-Brexit agreement (the Alliance Party were approached but declined to be involved) but no agreement was reached; the Greens said there was "too much distance" between the parties, Sinn Féin's abstentionist policy was criticised, and the SDLP admitted an agreement was unlikely. On 8 May, the SDLP rejected Sinn Féin's call for them to stand aside in some seats.

== Campaign ==
=== Background ===
Prior to the calling of the general election, the Liberal Democrats gained Richmond Park from the Conservatives in a by-election, a seat characterised by its high Remain vote in the 2016 EU referendum. The Conservatives held the safe seat of Sleaford and North Hykeham in December 2016. In by-elections on 23 February 2017, Labour held Stoke-on-Trent Central but lost Copeland to the Conservatives, the first time a governing party had gained a seat in a by-election since the Conservatives took Mitcham and Morden in 1982.

The general election came soon after the Northern Ireland Assembly election on 2 March. Talks on power-sharing between the DUP and Sinn Féin had failed to reach a conclusion, with Northern Ireland thus facing either another Assembly election, or the imposition of direct rule. The deadline was subsequently extended to 29 June.

Local elections in England, Scotland and Wales took place on 4 May. These saw large gains by the Conservatives, and large losses by Labour and UKIP. Notably, the Conservatives won metro mayor elections in Tees Valley and the West Midlands, areas traditionally seen as Labour heartlands. Initially scheduled for 4 May, a by-election in Manchester Gorton was cancelled; the seat was contested on 8 June along with all the other seats.

On 6 May, a letter from Church of England Archbishops Justin Welby and John Sentamu stressed the importance of education, housing, communities and health.

All parties suspended campaigning for a time in the wake of the Manchester Arena bombing on 22 May. The SNP had been scheduled to release their manifesto for the election but this was delayed. Campaigning resumed on 25 May.

Major political parties also suspended campaigning for a second time on 4 June, following the London Bridge attack. UKIP chose to continue campaigning. There were unsuccessful calls for polling day to be postponed.

=== Issues ===
==== Brexit ====
The UK's withdrawal from the European Union was expected to be a key issue in the campaign, but featured less than expected. May said she called the snap election to secure a majority for her Brexit negotiations. UKIP supported a "clean, quick and efficient Brexit" and, launching his party's election campaign, Nuttall stated that Brexit was a "job half done" and UKIP MPs were needed to "see this through to the end".

Labour had supported Brexit in the previous parliament – Corbyn did not vote against the triggering of Article 50. Corbyn's actions in the previous parliament therefore dispelled the doubts of Labour voters who had voted to leave the EU. However, his vision for Brexit prioritised different plans for the UK outside the EU. He wanted for Britain to still maintain the benefits of the single market and the custom union. The Liberal Democrats and Greens called for a deal to keep the UK in the single market and a second referendum on any deal proposed between the EU and the UK.

The Conservative manifesto committed the party to leaving the single market and customs union, but sought a "deep and special partnership" through a comprehensive free trade and customs agreement. It proposed seeking to remain part of some EU programmes where it would "be reasonable that we make a contribution", staying as a signatory of the European Convention on Human Rights over the next parliament, and maintaining the Human Rights Act during Brexit negotiations. Parliament would be able to amend or repeal EU legislation once converted into UK law, and have a vote on the final agreement.

==== Security ====
Two major terrorist attacks took place during the election campaign, with parties arguing about the best way to prevent such events. May, after the second attack, focused on global co-operation to tackle Islamist ideology and tackling the use of the internet by terrorist groups. Following the first attack, Labour criticised cuts in police numbers under the Conservative government. Corbyn also linked the Manchester attack to British foreign policy. The Conservatives stated that spending on counter-terrorism for both the police and other agencies had risen.

Former Conservative strategist Steve Hilton said Theresa May should be "resigning not seeking re-election", because her police cuts and security failures had led to the attacks. Corbyn backed calls for May to resign, but said she should be removed by voters. May said that police budgets for counter-terrorism had been maintained and that Corbyn had voted against counter-terrorism legislation.

The Conservative manifesto proposed more government control and regulation of the Internet, including forcing Internet companies to restrict access to extremist and adult content. Following the London attack, Theresa May called for international agreements to regulate the internet. The Conservative stance on regulation of the internet and social media was criticised by Farron and the Open Rights Group.

On 6 June, May promised longer prison sentences for people convicted of terrorism and restrictions on the freedom of movement or deportation of militant suspects when it is thought they present a threat but there is not enough evidence to prosecute them, stating that she would change human rights laws to do so if necessary.

The UK's nuclear weapons, including the renewal of the Trident system, also featured in the campaign. The Conservatives and Liberal Democrats favoured Trident renewal. Labour's manifesto committed to Trident renewal; Corbyn confirmed renewal would take place under Labour, but declined to explicitly speak in favour. He also declined to answer whether as prime minister he would use nuclear weapons if the UK was under imminent nuclear threat.

==== Social care ====
Social care became a major election issue after the Conservative Party's manifesto included new proposals, which were subsequently altered after criticism. The previous coalition government had commissioned a review by Andrew Dilnot into how to fund social care. Measures that were seen to disadvantage pensioners were also in the Conservative manifesto: eliminating the pension triple lock and Winter Fuel Payments for all pensioners. After the election, journalist Tim Shipman argued that social care was the single issue that cost May her majority.

==== Scottish independence and the future of the UK ====
The question of a proposed Scottish independence referendum was also thought likely to influence the campaign in Scotland. On 28 March 2017, the Scottish Parliament approved a motion requesting that Westminster pass a Section 30 order giving the Parliament the authority to hold a second independence referendum, suggesting that there had been a "material change of circumstances" since the independence referendum in 2014 as a result of Britain's vote to leave the EU and Scotland's vote to remain. The SNP hoped to hold a second independence referendum once the Brexit terms a were clear but before Britain left the EU; May said her government would not approve an independence referendum before Brexit negotiations had finished. After the final results were announced the SNP had lost 13% of the Scottish vote and one third of their seats – leading Sturgeon to conclude that, "Undoubtedly the issue of an independence referendum was a factor in this election result, but I think there were other factors as well".

==== University tuition fees ====
Labour was thought to have attracted a significant number of student voters with its pledge to abolish tuition fees, which stands at £9,250 a year in England, and bring back student grants.

==== Possible coalitions ====
Although Labour and the Liberal Democrats both rejected election pacts with each other and with the Greens and the SNP, and although the Liberal Democrats ruled out a coalition deal with the Conservatives, the Conservatives campaigned on the proposition that such deals might nevertheless occur, using the phrase "coalition of chaos". Similar messages against a potential Lib–Lab pact were credited with securing a Conservative win in the 1992 and 2015 elections. On 19 April, May warned against a Labour–SNP–Lib Dem pact that would "divide our country". After the hung result led the Conservatives to seek DUP support for a minority government, this rhetoric was mocked by opponents.

=== Party campaigns ===
==== Conservatives ====
May launched the Conservative campaign with a focus on Brexit, lower domestic taxes and avoiding a Labour–SNP–Lib Dem "coalition of chaos", but she refused to commit not to raise taxes. On 30 April, May stated that it was her intention to lower taxes if the Conservatives won the general election, but only explicitly ruled out raising VAT. May reiterated her commitment to spending 0.7% of GNI on foreign aid.

May hired Lynton Crosby, the campaign manager for the Conservatives in the 2015 general election, as well as former President of the United States Barack Obama's 2012 campaign manager, Jim Messina. The Conservative campaign was noted for the use of targeted adverts on social media, in particular attacking Corbyn. The repeated use of the phrase "strong and stable" in the Conservatives' campaigning attracted attention and criticism. Some expressed concern that the party may have restricted media access to the prime minister. While some speculated that an investigation into campaign spending by the Conservatives in the 2015 general election was a factor behind the snap election, on 10 May the Crown Prosecution Service said that despite evidence of inaccurate spending returns, no further action was required.

On 7 May the Conservatives promised to replace the Mental Health Act 1983, to employ an additional 10,000 NHS mental health workers by 2020 and to tackle discrimination against those with mental health problems. May indicated that the Conservatives would maintain their net immigration target, and promised to implement a cap on "rip-off energy prices", a policy that appeared in Labour's 2015 manifesto. May indicated she would permit a free vote among Conservative MPs on repealing the ban on fox hunting in England and Wales. On 11 May the Conservatives promised above-inflation increases in defence spending alongside its NATO commitment to spend at least 2% of GDP on defence.

In a speech in Tynemouth the next day, May said Labour had "deserted" working-class voters, criticised Labour's policy proposals and said Britain's future depended on making a success of Brexit. On 14 May the Conservatives proposed a "new generation" of social housing, paid from the existing capital budget, offering funding to local authorities and changing compulsory purchase rules. The following day May promised "a new deal for workers" that would maintain workers' rights currently protected by the EU after Brexit, put worker representation on company boards, introduce a statutory right to unpaid leave to care for a relative and increase the National Living Wage in line with average earnings until 2022. The proposals were characterised as an "unabashed pitch for Labour voters"; however Labour and the GMB trade union criticised the government's past record on workers' rights.

Unveiling the Conservative manifesto in Halifax on 18 May, May promised a "mainstream government that would deliver for mainstream Britain". It proposed to balance the budget by 2025, raise spending on the NHS by £8bn per year and on schools by £4bn per year by 2022, remove the ban on grammar schools, means-test the winter fuel allowance, replace the state pension "triple lock" with a "double lock" and require executive pay to be approved by a vote of shareholders. It dropped the 2015 pledge to not raise income tax or national insurance contributions but maintained a commitment to freeze VAT. New sovereign wealth funds for infrastructure, rules to prevent foreign takeovers of "critical national infrastructure" and institutes of technology were also proposed. The manifesto was noted for its intervention in industry, lack of tax cuts and increased spending commitments on public services. On Brexit it committed to leaving the single market and customs union while seeking a "deep and special partnership" and promised a vote in parliament on the final agreement. The manifesto was noted for containing similar policies to those found in Labour's 2015 general election manifesto.

The manifesto also proposed reforms to social care in England that would raise the threshold for free care from £23,250 to £100,000, while including property in the means test and permitting deferred payment after death. After attracting substantial media attention, four days after the manifesto launch, May stated that the proposed social care reforms would now include an "absolute limit" on costs in contrast to the rejection of a cap in the manifesto. She criticised the "fake" portrayal of the policy in recent days by Labour and other critics, who had termed it a "dementia tax". Evening Standard editor and former Conservative Chancellor George Osborne called the policy change a "U-turn".

The Conservative Party manifesto at the 2017 general election proposed repealing the Fixed-term Parliaments Act 2011.

==== Labour ====
Corbyn launched the Labour campaign focusing on public spending, and argued that services were being underfunded, particularly education. Labour's shadow Brexit secretary, Keir Starmer, stated that the party would replace the existing Brexit white paper with new negotiating priorities that emphasise the benefits of the single market and customs union, that the residence rights of EU nationals would be guaranteed and that the principle of free movement would have to end. Corbyn emphasised Labour's support for a "jobs-first Brexit" that "safeguards the future of Britain's vital industries".

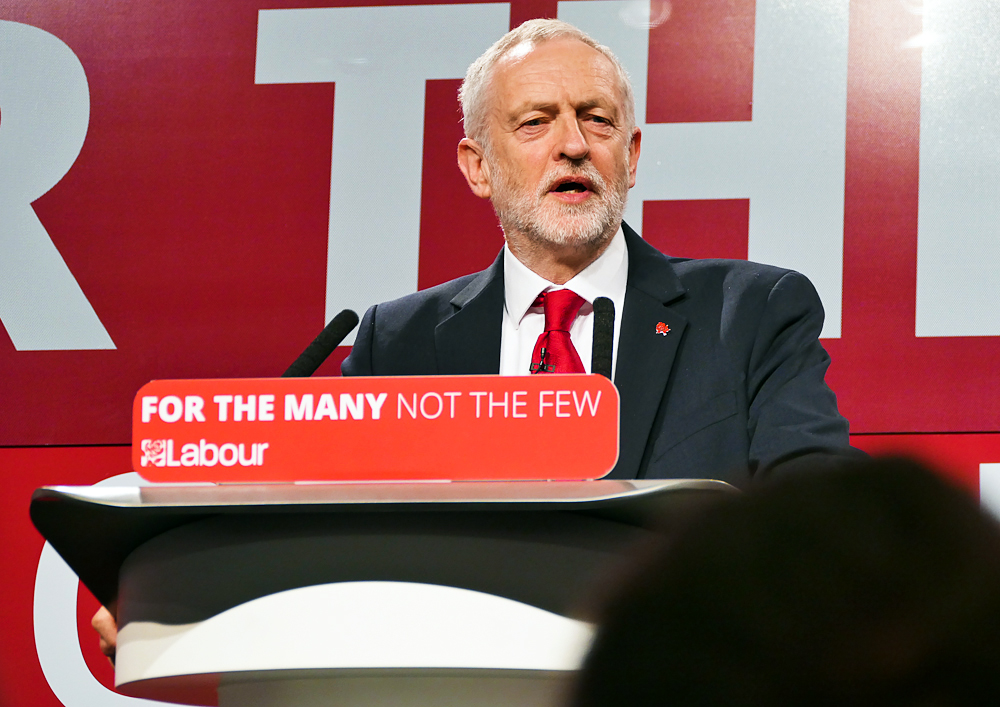
Labour leader Jeremy Corbyn launching the party's general election campaign on 9 May 2017 in Manchester.

Labour proposed the creation of four new bank holidays, marking the feast days of the patron saints of the United Kingdom's constituent nations. On 27 April the party pledged to build 1 million new homes over five years. Labour's proposal to employ 10,000 new police officers was overshadowed when Shadow Home Secretary Diane Abbott cited incorrect figures in a widely publicised gaffe in an LBC interview on 2 May on how it would be funded. Labour later stated that the £300 million cost would be funded by reversing cuts to capital gains taxes, although it was noted that the party had also pledged some of those savings towards other expenditure plans.

On 7 May, Shadow Chancellor John McDonnell ruled out rises in VAT and in income tax and employee national insurance contributions for those with earnings below £80,000 per year. The following day Labour outlined plans to ban junk food TV adverts and parking charges at NHS hospitals. Labour promised an additional £4.8 billion for education, funded by raising corporation tax from 19% to 26%.

A draft copy of Labour's manifesto was leaked to the Daily Mirror and The Daily Telegraph on 10 May. It included pledges to renationalise the National Grid, railways, and the Royal Mail and create publicly owned energy companies. The draft was noted for including commitments to workers' rights, a ban on fracking, and the abolition of university tuition fees in England. The draft manifesto included a commitment to the Trident nuclear deterrent, but suggested a future government would be "extremely cautious" about using it. The next day Labour's Clause V meeting endorsed the manifesto after amendments from shadow cabinet members and trade unions present.

In a speech at Chatham House on 12 May, Corbyn set out his foreign policy, saying he would reshape Britain's foreign relations, avoid the use of nuclear weapons, and while Labour supported Trident renewal he would initiate a defence review in government. Corbyn stated that he would halt all weapons sales from the UK to Saudi Arabia citing the violations of human rights in the Saudi Arabian-led intervention in Yemen. Following the 2017 London Bridge attack, Corbyn said that a conversation should take place "with Saudi Arabia and other Gulf states that have funded and fuelled extremist ideology".

On 14 May, Labour revealed plans to extend stamp duty by introducing a financial transaction tax, which McDonnell claimed would raise up to £5.6bn per year. The next day Corbyn set out plans to spend £37bn on the NHS in England over a five-year parliament, including £10bn on IT upgrades and building repairs.

Launching its manifesto officially on 16 May, Labour revealed it would nationalise the water industry, provide 30 hours per week of free childcare for two- to four-year-olds, charge companies a levy on annual earnings above £330,000, lower the 45p income tax rate threshold to £80,000 per year, and reintroduce the 50p tax rate for those earning more than £123,000 per year. Labour said it would raise an additional £48.6bn in tax revenue per year and insisted its policies were fully costed, though it was noted no costings were provided for its nationalisation pledges. Compared to the leaked draft, the manifesto was noted for toughening Labour's position on defence and Trident, confirming that outside the EU free movement would have to end, qualifying support for airport expansion, and clarifying the party's stance on Israel-Palestine, as well as other changes. Following initial confusion, Labour clarified it would not reverse the government's freeze on most working-age benefits.

In an interview following the manifesto launch, Unite general secretary Len McCluskey said victory for Labour in the general election would be "extraordinary" and that winning just 200 seats (compared to 229 seats held at the time) would be a "successful" result; the following morning he clarified he was now "optimistic" about Labour's chances.

==== SNP ====
The SNP, keen to maintain its position as the third-largest party in the House of Commons, made the need to protect Scotland's interests in the Brexit negotiations a central part of its campaign. The SNP manifesto called for a vote on independence to be held "at the end of the Brexit process", set out "anti-austerity" plans to invest £118bn in UK public services over the next five years, pledged to increase the minimum wage to £10 an hour and called for Scotland to have control over immigration and to remain in the EU single market after Brexit. With the polls closing, Nicola Sturgeon told the Today programme that the SNP could support a Labour government "on an issue-by-issue basis" in the event of a hung parliament and she would be open to forming a "progressive alternative to a Conservative government".

==== Liberal Democrats ====
Central themes of the Liberal Democrat campaign were an offer of a referendum on any eventual Brexit deal and a desire for the UK to stay in the single market. The party reportedly targeted seats which had voted to remain in the EU, such as Twickenham, Oxford West and Abingdon, and Vauxhall. Bob Marshall-Andrews, a Labour MP from 1997 to 2010, announced he would support the Liberal Democrats.

The party reported a surge in membership after the election was called, passing 100,000 on 24 April, having grown by 12,500 in the preceding week. The party also reported raising £500,000 in donations in the first 48 hours after May's announcement of an early election.

An early issue raised in the campaign was Tim Farron's views, as a Christian, regarding gay sex and LGBT rights. After declining to state whether he thought gay sex was a sin, Farron affirmed that he believed neither being gay nor having gay sex are sinful.

The party proposed raising income tax by 1p to fund the NHS and maintaining the triple-lock on the state pension. The Liberal Democrats also promised an additional £7 billion to protect per-pupil funding in education; they said it would be partly funded by remaining in the EU single market. The party pledged on 11 May to accept 50,000 refugees from Syria over five years, with Farron saying that the £4.3 billion costs would over time be repaid in taxes by those refugees that settle in Britain.

On 12 May the party revealed plans to legalise cannabis and extend paid paternity leave. Farron proposed financial incentives for graduates joining the armed forces and committed to NATO's 2% of GDP defence spending target. The next day the Liberal Democrats promised to end the cap on public-sector pay increases and repeal the Investigatory Powers Act. On 16 May the Liberal Democrats proposed an entrepreneurs' allowance, to review business rates and to increase access to credit.

Policies emphasised during their manifesto launch on 17 May included a second referendum on a Brexit deal with the option to remain a member of the EU, discounted bus passes for 16- to 21-year-olds, the reinstatement of Housing Benefit for 18- to 21-year-olds, a £3bn plan to build 300,000 new houses a year by 2022 and support for renters to build up equity in their rented properties.

==== UKIP ====
Paul Nuttall announced that UKIP's manifesto would seek to ban the burqa, outlaw sharia law, impose a temporary moratorium on new Islamic schools and require annual checks against female genital mutilation (FGM) for high-risk girls. In response to the proposed burqa ban UKIP's foreign affairs spokesperson James Carver resigned, labelling the policy "misguided".

Despite losing all 145 of the seats it was defending in the 2017 local elections (but gaining one from Labour in Burnley), Nuttall insisted voters would return to UKIP in the general election. On 8 May UKIP proposed a net migration target of zero within five years.

=== Television debates ===
← 2015 debates	2017	2019 debates →

Within hours of the election being announced, Corbyn, Farron and Sturgeon called for televised debates. The Prime Minister's office initially opposed the idea. On 19 April, the BBC and ITV announced they planned to host leaders' debates, as they had done in the 2010 and 2015 elections, whether or not May took part. Labour subsequently ruled out Corbyn taking part in television debates without May.

Broadcaster Andrew Neil separately interviewed the party leaders in The Andrew Neil Interviews on BBC One, starting on 22 May with Theresa May. The Manchester Arena bombing led to interviews with Nuttall, Farron, Sturgeon and Corbyn being rescheduled. ITV Tonight also ran a series of programmes with the major party leaders.

Sky News and Channel 4 hosted an election programme on 29 May where May and Corbyn were individually interviewed by Jeremy Paxman after taking questions from a studio audience. The BBC held two debates to which all seven main party leaders were invited, on 31 May in Cambridge and 6 June in Manchester; both May and Corbyn stated they would not attend the 31 May debate. May said that she had already debated Corbyn many times in parliament, and that she would be meeting the public instead. Corbyn announced on the day that he would attend the debate in Cambridge, calling on May to do the same. Instead Amber Rudd appeared for the Conservatives.

The BBC hosted separate debates for the English regions, and for both Scotland and Wales, and also a Question Time special with May and Corbyn separately answering questions from voters on 2 June, chaired by David Dimbleby. Sturgeon and Farron were expected to do the same on 4 June, but after the 2017 London Bridge attack it was rescheduled to 5 June and instead presented by Nick Robinson. The BBC also hosted two back-to-back episodes of a special election programme titled Election Questions on 4 June, the first in Bristol with Green Party co-leader Jonathan Bartley followed by Nuttall, and the second in Swansea with Plaid Cymru leader Leanne Wood. The party leaders were individually questioned by a studio audience.

STV planned to host a live TV debate in Glasgow with four Scottish party leaders on 24 May, but it was postponed, owing to the Manchester Arena bombing. The debate was rescheduled for Tuesday 6 June.

May subsequently stated her regret in not taking part in the debates, explaining her reasoning for not taking part in the debates as they had "[sucked] the life blood out of David Cameron's campaign" in 2010.

United Kingdom general election debates, 2017
Date	Organisers	Venue	Invitees	P Present S Surrogate NI Non-invitee A Absent invitee						
Date	Organisers	Venue	Invitees	Cons.	Labour	SNP	Lib. Dem.	Plaid Cymru	Green	UKIP
16 May	ITV Wales	Cardiff	Welsh leaders	P Davies	P Jones	NI	P Williams	P Wood	NI	P Hamilton
18 May	ITV	dock10 studios, Manchester	National leaders	A	A	P Sturgeon	P Farron	P Wood	P Lucas	P Nuttall
21 May	BBC Scotland	Edinburgh	Scottish leaders	P Davidson	P Dugdale	P Sturgeon	P Rennie	NI	P Harvie	P Coburn
29 May	Sky News; Channel 4	Sky Studios, Isleworth, London	National leaders	P May	P Corbyn	NI	NI	NI	NI	NI
30 May	BBC Wales	Cardiff	Welsh leaders	S Millar	P Jones	NI	P Williams	P Wood	NI	P Hamilton
30 May	BBC English Regions	Various	English regional	P Various	P Various	NI	P Various	NI	P Various	P Various
31 May	BBC	Senate House, Cambridge	National leaders	S Rudd	P Corbyn	S Robertson	P Farron	P Wood	P Lucas	P Nuttall
2 June	BBC (Question Time)	University of York, York	National leaders	P May	P Corbyn	NI	NI	NI	NI	NI
4 June	BBC (Election Questions)	Bristol and Swansea	National leaders	NI	NI	NI	NI	P Wood	P Bartley	P Nuttall
5 June	BBC (Question Time)	Edinburgh	National leaders	NI	NI	P Sturgeon	P Farron	NI	NI	NI
5 June	UTV	Belfast	Northern Ireland	Nigel Dodds (DUP), Michelle O'Neill (SF), Robin Swann (UUP), Colum Eastwood (SDLP) and Naomi Long (APNI)						
6 June	STV	Glasgow	Scottish leaders	P Davidson	P Dugdale	P Sturgeon	P Rennie	NI	NI	NI
6 June	BBC Newsbeat	Manchester	National leaders	S Zahawi	S Champion	S Forbes	S Paddick	S Fflur Elin	P Bartley	S Kurten
6 June	BBC	Belfast	Northern Ireland leaders	Jeffrey Donaldson (DUP), John O'Dowd (SF), Robin Swann (UUP), Colum Eastwood (SDLP) and Naomi Long (APNI)						

=== Campaign costs ===
In the 12 months leading up to the election, the Conservatives spent £18.5m, Labour spent £11m and the Liberal Democrats spent £6.8m.

== Endorsements ==
Newspapers, organisations and individuals endorsed parties or individual candidates for the election. For example, the main national newspapers gave the following endorsements:

=== National daily newspapers ===
Newspapers	Endorsement	Notes	2017 circulation (June)	Link
Daily Express	Conservative Party		386,297	
Daily Mail	Conservative Party		1,454,073	
Daily Mirror	Labour Party	On election day, urged its readers to vote for whoever would beat the Conservatives in their constituency.	687,000	
Daily Star	None		437,949	
The Daily Telegraph	Conservative Party		467,601	
Financial Times	Conservative Party		58,600 (UK circ.)	
The Guardian	Labour Party	Prioritised tactical voting against the Conservatives, including votes for Liberal Democrats and Greens.	154,010	
The Guardian	Various (Scotland)	In Scotland: supported opposition to the Conservatives, either SNP or Labour.	[A percentage of circulation statistic above]	
i	None		263,826	
The Independent	None	Backed Labour's Shadow Secretary of State for Exiting the European Union Keir Starmer to negotiate Brexit. Supported unionist candidates in Northern Ireland, Scotland and Wales.	N/A	
Metro	None		1,480,110	
The Sun	Conservative Party		1,617,152	
The Times	Conservative Party		445,737	

=== National Sunday newspapers ===
The Conservative Party were endorsed by 80% of UK national Sunday newspaper market.

Newspaper	Endorsement	Notes	2017 circulation (Jan.)	Link
The Mail on Sunday	Conservative Party		1,257,984	
The Observer	None	Endorsed voting against the Conservatives and for candidates opposing austerity and a hard Brexit.	185,752	
Sunday Express	Conservative Party		335,772	
Sunday Mirror	Labour Party		629,277	
Sunday People	None	Endorsed tactical voting against the Conservatives.	240,846	
The Sun on Sunday	Conservative Party		1,375,539	
The Sunday Telegraph	Conservative Party		359,400	
The Sunday Times	Conservative Party		792,324	

== Media coverage ==
In contrast to the 2015 general election, in which smaller parties received more media coverage than usual, coverage during the 2017 election focused on the two main political parties, Labour and the Conservatives (84% of the politicians featured in newspapers, and 67% on TV, were Conservative or Labour), with Conservatives sources receiving the most coverage and quotation, particularly in the print media (the margin of difference between Conservative and Labour sources was 2.1 points on TV and 9.6 points in newspapers). The five most prominent politicians were Theresa May (Cons) (30.1% of news appearanced), Jeremy Corbyn (Lab) (26.7%), Tim Farron (Lib Dem) (6.8%), Nicola Sturgeon (SNP) (3.7%), and Boris Johnson (Cons) (3.6%). The Democratic Unionist Party (DUP) received next to no coverage during the campaign (0.4% of appearances) but were prominent in coverage after the election.

Social media was used during the election campaign by both political parties. Labour's key success in the election campaign was partly attributed to the use of social media. It was shown that Labour, who took the strategy of going for 'positive posting', like focusing on social improvement, welfare and public services was favoured over the Conservatives who had focused on negative topics like campaigning on security and terrorism. The findings showed that over the course of the election campaign, Labour had outperformed the Conservatives and Corbyn's personal Facebook page significantly outweighed May's Facebook page by 5 million to nearly 800,000.

Newspapers were partisan in their coverage and generally took an attacking editorial line, providing negative coverage of one or more parties they opposed rather than advocating for the party they endorsed, with Labour receiving the most negative coverage. Mick Temple, professor of Journalism and Politics at Staffordshire University, characterised the negativity Corbyn and Labour received during this election as more hostile than that which Ed Miliband and Labour received during the 2015 general election. Jeremy Corbyn was portrayed as a coward, and he and his closest allies were accused of being terrorist sympathizers. During the election period, BBC Question Time host David Dimbleby said Jeremy Corbyn had not had 'a fair deal at the hands of the press' and that he was more popular than the media made him out to be. An exception, when the Conservative Party received more negative coverage than Labour, was during the third week of the campaign, when the Conservatives released their manifesto, proposed a controversial social welfare policy (which became known as the "dementia tax") and subsequently made a U-turn on the proposal. When newspaper circulation size is accounted for, the Conservative Party was the only party to receive a positive evaluation overall from the press. It was endorsed by newspapers that had an 80% share of the national Sunday press audience (the five Sunday newspapers endorsing the Conservatives had a daily circulation of more than 4 million) and 57% of the national daily press (a combined circulation of 4,429,460).

One national Sunday newspaper (the Sunday Mirror), endorsed Labour, with two others endorsing tactical voting against the Conservative (these three titles, with a daily circulation of under 1 million, had a share of 20% of the Sunday press audience), and 11% of the national daily press (namely, The Guardian and the Daily Mirror; a combined circulation of 841,010). On this metric, 'Conservative partisanship was the most salient voice in the British national press'. When newspapers' articles were measured by their positivity and negativity towards and against the parties standing in the election, The Sun, The Daily Telegraph, the Daily Express and the Daily Mail provided support for the Conservatives and The Guardian and the Daily Mirror provided support for the Labour party. However, few Guardian or Mirror election-related editorials called for a vote for Labour, and even fewer endorsed Corbyn – many articles in left-wing papers criticised him, or he was ignored. While the collective voice of the right-wing papers were (four times) stronger in their support for the Conservatives than the left-wing were of Labour, on the whole they were similar to the left in their negativity towards, or avoidance of, the leader of their endorsed party. Only the Daily Express gave Theresa May unreserved support. After the election, the press turned on Theresa May, who had run on a campaign that platformed her as a 'strong and stable' leader, and they described her as 'weak and wobbly', 'robotic', the 'zombie prime minister', and a 'dead woman walking'.

Broadcast media, by giving airtime directly to Jeremy Corbyn and his policy ideas, was seen as playing a significant role during the election in presenting him as someone less frightening that the newspapers had presented him and more engaging than Theresa May. The BBC has been criticised for its coverage during the election campaign. For example, right-wing papers The Sun and the Daily Mail complained that the audience at the BBC run leaders' debate was pro-Corbyn, and the Daily Mail asked why the topic of immigration, one of the Conservatives favoured issues, was barely mentioned; and right-wing websites Breitbart London and Westmonster said BBC coverage on Brexit was pro-EU. Left-wing websites, like The Canary, The Skwawkbox and Another Angry Voice complained that the BBC was pro-Tory and anti-Corbyn. According to analysts, a bias was evident during Jeremy Paxman's leaders debates, with 54% of airtime devoted to Conservative issues and 31% to Labour's. In an episode of Have I Got News for You aired during the campaign period, Ian Hislop, editor of Private Eye, suggested the BBC was biased in favour of the Conservatives. The BBC's political editor Laura Kuenssberg particularly received criticism for her election coverage. During the election the BBC circulated a 2015 report of Kuenssberg's (on Corbyn's views on 'shoot to kill' policy) that had been censured by the BBC Trust for its misleading editing; on the final day of the election the BBC acknowledged that the clip was subject to a complaint that had been upheld by the Trust.

As during the 2015 election, although less than then (−12.5%), most media coverage (32.9%) was given to the workings of the electoral process itself (e.g., electoral events, opinion polls, 'horse race' coverage, campaign mishaps). During the first two weeks of campaigning, members of the public, interviewed in vox pops, made up a fifth to almost a half of all sources in broadcast news. While in the first two weeks of the election period policy made up less than half of all broadcast coverage, over the whole campaign policy received more coverage in all media than during the previous election, particularly after manifestos were published in the third week, when close to eight in ten broadcast news items were primarily about policy issues. Policy around Brexit and the EU receiving most coverage overall (10.9%), and national events that happened during the campaign period (namely, the terrorist attacks on Manchester Arena and in the area of London Bridge), along with controversies over Trident, brought policy issues around defence and security to the fore (7.2%).

From the start of the campaign, commentators predicted a landslide victory for the Conservatives. After the results were in and the Conservatives had won by a much smaller margin, on air Channel 4's Jon Snow said, "I know nothing, we the media, the pundits and experts, know nothing". A number of newspaper columnists expressed similar sentiments. Some analysts and commentators have suggested the gap between the newspapers' strong support, and the public's marginal support, for the Conservatives in this election indicates a decline in the influence of print media, and/or that in 2017's election social media played a decisive role (perhaps being the first election in which this was the case). Some website and blog content, like that produced by The Canary and Another Angry Voice, gained as much traffic as many mainstream media articles and went more viral than mainstream political journalism. The London Economic had the most shared election-related article online during the campaign. Others urge caution, stressing that the traditional press still have an importance influence on how people vote. In a YouGov poll, 42% of the general public said that TV was most influential in helping them choose, or confirming their choice in, whom to vote for; 32% said newspapers and magazines; 26%, social media; and 25%, radio. 58% of people surveyed also thought that the social media had diminished the influence of newspapers.

== Politicians not standing ==
=== Members of Parliament who did not stand for re-election ===
MP	Seat	First elected	Party	Date announced
Graham Allen	Nottingham North	1987	Labour	22 April 2017
Dave Anderson	Blaydon	2005	Labour	20 April 2017
Tom Blenkinsop	Middlesbrough South and East Cleveland	2010	Labour	18 April 2017
Andy Burnham	Leigh	2001	Labour	19 April 2017
Sir Simon Burns	Chelmsford	1987	Conservative	8 January 2016
Douglas Carswell	Clacton	2005	Independent (UKIP in 2015)	20 April 2017
Pat Doherty	West Tyrone	2001	Sinn Féin	3 May 2017
Jim Dowd	Lewisham West and Penge	1992	Labour	19 April 2017
Michael Dugher	Barnsley East	2010	Labour	20 April 2017
Sir Edward Garnier	Harborough	1992	Conservative	27 April 2017
Pat Glass	North West Durham	2010	Labour	28 June 2016
Sir Alan Haselhurst	Saffron Walden	1970 (Middleton and Prestwich)	Conservative	25 April 2017
Sir Gerald Howarth	Aldershot	1983 (Cannock and Burntwood)	Conservative	20 April 2017
Alan Johnson	Hull West and Hessle	1997	Labour	18 April 2017
Peter Lilley	Hitchin and Harpenden	1983 (St Albans)	Conservative	26 April 2017
Karen Lumley	Redditch	2010	Conservative	28 April 2017
David Mackintosh	Northampton South	2015	Conservative	27 April 2017
Fiona Mactaggart	Slough	1997	Labour	20 April 2017
Rob Marris	Wolverhampton South West	2001	Labour	19 April 2017
Natalie McGarry	Glasgow East	2015	Independent (SNP in 2015)	25 April 2017
George Osborne	Tatton	2001	Conservative	19 April 2017
Sir Eric Pickles	Brentwood and Ongar	1992	Conservative	22 April 2017
John Pugh	Southport	2001	Liberal Democrats	19 April 2017
Steve Rotheram	Liverpool Walton	2010	Labour	7 May 2017
Andrew Smith	Oxford East	1987	Labour	19 April 2017
Gisela Stuart	Birmingham Edgbaston	1997	Labour	19 April 2017
Michelle Thomson	Edinburgh West	2015	Independent (SNP in 2015)	22 April 2017
Andrew Turner	Isle of Wight	2001	Conservative	28 April 2017
Andrew Tyrie	Chichester	1997	Conservative	25 April 2017
Dame Angela Watkinson	Hornchurch and Upminster	2001	Conservative	19 April 2017
Iain Wright	Hartlepool	2004	Labour	19 April 2017

=== Other politicians ===
Former UKIP leader Nigel Farage announced that he would not stand, saying he could be more effective as an MEP. UKIP major donor Arron Banks, who had earlier indicated his intention to stand in Clacton to defeat Douglas Carswell, withdrew in favour of the UKIP candidate after Carswell announced he would be standing down.

Plaid Cymru leader Leanne Wood chose not to contest a Westminster seat, nor did former Labour MP and shadow chancellor Ed Balls.

== Opinion polling and seat projections ==
In the 2015 general election, polling companies underestimated the Conservative Party vote and overestimated the Labour Party vote and so failed to predict the result accurately. Afterwards they started making changes to polling practices; recommendations from a review by the British Polling Council are likely to result in further changes. Almost all polls and predictions were for seats in Great Britain only, with Northern Irish parties being either absent from the totals or counted as "other". The Spreadex columns below cover bets on the number of seats each party will win with the midpoint between asking and selling price.

LOESS graph of opinion polling for the 2017 election. Final point is actual result. Conservative Labour UKIP Liberal Democrats SNP Greens

=== Predictions three weeks before the vote ===
The first-past-the-post system used in UK general elections means that the number of seats won is not directly related to vote share. Thus, several approaches are used to convert polling data and other information into seat predictions. The table below lists some of the predictions.

Parties	Election Forecast as of 15 May 2017	Electoral Calculus as of 20 May 2017	Lord Ashcroft as of 12 May 2017	Elections Etc. as of 12 May 2017	Spreadex as of 17 May 2017
Conservatives	414	391	406–415	391	397
Labour Party	155	185	152–164	170	161
SNP	54	47	45–48	49	44.5
Liberal Democrats	6	5	8–14	13	16
Plaid Cymru	2	3	4–5	3	—N/a
Green Party	1	1	1	1	1.5
UKIP	0	0	0	0	0.5
Others	1 (Note: GB forecast only)	18 (Note: Electoral Calculus counts Speaker John Bercow in the Conservative total)	19	—N/a	—N/a
Overall result (probability)	Conservative majority of 178	Conservative majority of 132	Conservative majority of 162–180	Conservative majority of 132	Conservative majority of 144

=== Predictions two weeks before the vote ===
Parties	Election Forecast as of 26 May 2017	Electoral Calculus as of 28 May 2017	Lord Ashcroft as of 26 May 2017	Elections Etc. as of 26 May 2017	New Statesman as of 26 May 2017
Conservatives	364	383	396	375	371
Labour Party	212	196	180	188	199
SNP	45	49	47	50	55
Liberal Democrats	8	2	6	10	5
Plaid Cymru	2	1	2	3	—N/a
Green Party	0	1	0	1	—N/a
UKIP	0	0	0	0	—N/a
Others	1	18	19	—N/a	—N/a
Overall result (probability)	Conservative majority of 78	Conservative majority of 116	Conservative majority of 142	Conservative majority of 100	Conservative majority of 92

=== Predictions one week before the vote ===
Parties	Election Forecast as of 1 June 2017	Electoral Calculus as of 31 May 2017	New Statesman as of 31 May 2017	YouGov as of 1 June 2017	Britain Elects as of 1 June 2017	Spreadex as of 31 May 2017
Conservatives	379	368	359	317	362	367
Labour Party	195	208	209	253	206	200
SNP	46	50	54	47	47	46.5
Liberal Democrats	7	3	7	9	11	13.5
Plaid Cymru	2	2	—N/a	3	4	—N/a
Green Party	1	1	—N/a	1	1	1.25
UKIP	1	0	—N/a	0	0	0.5
Others	1	18	—N/a	2	19	—N/a
Overall result (probability)	Conservative majority of 108	Conservative majority of 86	Conservative majority of 68	Hung; Parliament (Con 9 seats short)	Conservative majority of 74	Conservative majority of 84

=== Predictions on polling day ===
The UK's first-past-the-post electoral system means that national shares of the vote do not give an exact indicator of how the various parties will be represented in Parliament. Different commentators and pollsters currently provide a number of predictions, based on polls and other data, as to how the parties will be represented in Parliament:

Parties	Election Forecast as of 8 June 2017	Electoral Calculus as of 8 June 2017	Lord Ashcroft as of 8 June 2017	Elections Etc. as of 8 June 2017	New Statesman as of 8 June 2017	YouGov as of 8 June 2017	Britain Elects as of 8 June 2017	Spreadex as of 8 June 2017
Conservatives	366	358	357	358	337	302	356	368
Labour Party	207	218	217	214	227	269	219	201
SNP	46	49	44	47	54	44	43	46.5
Liberal Democrats	7	3	5	9	10	12	9	11.5
Plaid Cymru	3	3	1	3	—N/a	2	3	—N/a
Green Party	1	1	0	1	—N/a	1	1	1
UKIP	1	0	0	0	—N/a	0	0	0
Others	1 (Note: GB forecast only)	19	—N/a	—N/a	—N/a	20	19	—N/a
Overall result	Conservative majority of 82	Conservative majority of 66	Conservative majority of 64	Conservative majority of 66	Conservative majority of 24	Hung; Parliament (Con 24 seats short)	Conservative majority of 62	Conservative majority of 86

- Lord Ashcroft Polls announced an estimate for the election result. He updated it at intervals on his website.
- Electoral Calculus maintained a running projection of seats according to latest polls on its website. It also maintained a seat-by-seat projection for Scotland.
- Election Forecast also maintained a projection of seats based on current opinion poll averages on their website.
- Elections Etc. issued regular forecasts based on current opinion poll averages, Betting Markets, expert predictions and other sources on their website.
- YouGov issued daily seat estimates using their aggregated statistical election model.
- Britain Elects maintained a 'nowcast' – a projection showing what the result would be if held today – of seats based on historical data as well as national and regional polling.

=== Exit poll ===
An exit poll, conducted by GfK and Ipsos MORI on behalf of the BBC, ITV and Sky News, was published at the end of voting at 10 pm, predicting the number of seats for each party, with the Conservatives being the largest party, but short of an overall majority: Actual results were close to the prediction.

Parties	Seats	Change
Conservative Party	314	▼17
Labour Party	266	▲34
Scottish National Party	34	▼22
Liberal Democrats	14	▲6
Plaid Cymru	3	Steady
Green Party	1	Steady
UKIP	0	▼1
Others	18	Steady
Hung Parliament (Conservatives 12 seats short of overall majority)

== Results ==
Result by countries and English regions

Results for all constituencies except Kensington were reported by the morning after the election. The Conservatives remained the largest single party in terms of seats and votes, but were short of a parliamentary majority. The Conservatives won 317 seats with 42.4% of the vote while the Labour Party won 262 seats with 40.0% of the vote. The election resulted in the third hung parliament since the Second World War, elections in February 1974 and 2010 having previously resulted in hung parliaments. YouGov correctly predicted a hung parliament after employing "controversial" methodology.

Twenty-nine seats that had changed parties at the 2015 election changed parties again in 2017. Nineteen of these seats returned the candidate from the party that had held the seat in 2010. A third party took ten of these seats: nine were Conservative gains from the SNP in seats that the SNP had won from Labour in 2015, whilst Portsmouth South, which the Conservatives had gained from the Lib Dems in 2015, was then gained by Labour in 2017.

In England, Labour made a net gain of 21 seats, taking 25 constituencies from the Conservatives and two from the Liberal Democrats. Its gains were predominantly in university towns and cities and in London, most notably achieving victories in the London constituencies of Battersea, Croydon Central, Enfield Southgate and Kensington. Labour also took the university constituencies of Canterbury, Ipswich and Lincoln from the Conservatives by narrow margins; Labour's surge has been credited to the large-scale consolidation of the British Muslim vote, especially those from Pakistanis, behind Corbyn, renowned for his anti-Israeli and anti-Zionist activism. However it also lost five seats to the Conservatives, largely in the Midlands, and did not regain Copeland which had been lost in a February by-election. The Conservatives had gained Mansfield, which had been held by Labour since 1918. The Conservatives experienced a net loss of 22 seats, the first time since 1997 that the party suffered a net loss of seats. They gained Clacton from UKIP and Southport from the Liberal Democrats in addition to the six gains from Labour. The Liberal Democrats took five seats from the Conservatives, including Twickenham, won back by Vince Cable, and Kingston and Surbiton, won by Ed Davey, but lost two seats to Labour: Leeds North West and Sheffield Hallam, the seat of former party leader Nick Clegg. Richmond Park, which the Liberal Democrats had won in a 2016 by-election, was narrowly lost to the Conservatives. Caroline Lucas remained the sole Green Party MP, retaining Brighton Pavilion.

In Scotland, the Conservatives, Labour, and the Liberal Democrats all gained seats from the SNP, whose losses were attributed to opposition to a second Scottish independence referendum, contributing to tactical voting for unionist parties. The Conservative Party placed second in Scotland for the first time since 1992, won its largest number of seats in Scotland since 1983 and recorded its highest share of the vote there since 1979. With thirteen seats, the Scottish Conservatives became the largest unionist party in Scotland for the first time since 1955. Labour gained six seats from the SNP; one of which was Kirkcaldy and Cowdenbeath, the old seat of former Labour Prime Minister Gordon Brown, whereas the Liberal Democrats gained three. Having won 56 of 59 Scottish seats at the last general election, the SNP lost a total of 21 seats, and majorities in its remaining seats were greatly reduced. High-profile losses included SNP Commons leader Angus Robertson in Moray and former party leader and ex-First Minister Alex Salmond in Gordon.

In Wales, Labour held 25 seats and gained Cardiff North, Gower and Vale of Clwyd from the Conservatives, leaving the Welsh Conservatives with eight seats. Plaid Cymru retained its three existing seats and gained Ceredigion, the Liberal Democrats' only seat in Wales. This was the first ever election at which the Liberal Democrats or one of their ancestral parties failed to win a seat in Wales.

In Northern Ireland, the SDLP lost its three seats (Foyle and South Down to Sinn Féin and Belfast South to the DUP), while the UUP lost its two seats (Fermanagh and South Tyrone to Sinn Féin and South Antrim to the DUP). With the Alliance Party failing to win any seats or regain Belfast East, this left the DUP with ten seats (up from eight) and Sinn Féin with seven (up from four); independent unionist Sylvia Hermon retained North Down. Recording its best result since partition, Sinn Féin confirmed it would continue its abstentionist policy, leaving no nationalist representation in the House of Commons.

UKIP failed to win any seats, its vote share falling from 12.6% at the previous general election to just 1.8%; party leader Paul Nuttall came third in Boston and Skegness. The Greens' vote share dropped from 3.8% to 1.6%.

=== Analysis ===
The result was noted for increased vote shares for Labour (up 9.6 percentage points) and the Conservatives (up 5.5 percentage points), with a combined 82.4% share of the vote, up from 67.3% in 2015. The highest combined share of the vote for the two main parties since 1970, it was suggested this indicated a return to two-party politics caused by tactical voting which led to the Conservatives having a smaller share of seats despite an increased number of votes. The election was characterised by higher turnout, particularly among younger voters, which may have contributed to Labour's increased vote share. Research company Ipsos MORI considered age to be one of the most significant factors behind the result; compared to the 2015 general election, under-45s tended to opt more for Labour and over-54s for the Conservatives. It found 60% of those aged 18–24 voted Labour while 61% of over-64s voted Conservative. The swing to Labour was high in those seats with large numbers of young people. In seats where the Remain vote was strong there was also evidence of tactical voting against the Conservatives to stop a "hard Brexit", with many voters opting for the non-Conservative candidate with the best chance of winning.

In terms of social grade, Labour increased its share of middle-class voters (defined as ABC1) by 12 percentage points compared to the previous election while the Conservatives increased their share of working-class voters (C2DE) by 12 percentage points. Political scientist John Curtice found that the Conservatives tended to experience a greater increase in vote share in seats with a higher proportion of working-class voters, particularly those that voted Leave in the EU referendum. Many of Labour's most successful results occurred in seats that voted Remain by a large margin in 2016.

Compared to previous elections, turnout by private renters increased (from 51% in 2010 to 65%) and favoured Labour to a greater degree, with the party achieving a 23-point lead over the Conservatives among private renters; the Conservatives maintained a 14-point lead among homeowners. In terms of education, YouGov found that a one-point lead for the Conservatives among university graduates in 2015 had flipped to a 17-point lead for Labour in 2017. For those with low educational qualifications, the Conservatives led by 22 points, up from 8 points in 2015.

It was suggested that UKIP's decline boosted both main parties, but tended to help Labour retain seats in the North of England and the Midlands against the Conservatives, though it may have also benefited the Conservatives in predominantly working-class seats. Ipsos Mori found that UKIP's collapse was consistent across all age groups.

Published in August 2017, the British Election Study (BES), which surveyed 30,000 voters, found that despite a relatively low profile in the campaign, Brexit was considered to be the single most important issue facing the country by over a third of respondents. It found more than half of UKIP voters in 2015 went to the Conservatives, while 18% went to Labour. Remain voters tended to favour Labour, with the party particularly gaining among Remain voters who previously supported other parties, despite perceived uncertainty over its position on the single market. There was a strong correlation between those who prioritised controlling immigration and the Conservatives, while the same was true for supporting single market access and those who opted for Labour or the Liberal Democrats.

The BES study indicated the importance of the campaign period. A pre-election survey found 41% for the Conservatives and 27% for Labour, but by the election 19% of voters had switched party. Unlike the previous election where both main parties achieved similar shares of late-switchers, Labour won 54% while the Conservatives won 19%. Likeability of party leaders also narrowed over the course of the campaign.

Newly elected MPs included Britain's first turbaned Sikh MP, Tan Dhesi, the first woman Sikh MP, Preet Gill, and the first MP of Palestinian descent, Layla Moran.

A record number of woman and LGBT+ MPs were elected. 208 woman MPs were elected to Parliament; the first time more than 200 MPs were women and beating the previous high of 196 woman MPs in the last Parliament. For the first time, a majority of MPs were educated at state comprehensive schools. More MPs who are known to be disabled were elected in 2017 than in 2015.

=== Long-term trends ===
The results of the 2017 general election indicate the tilting of Britain's political axis, which reflects long-term trends. Looking at information of constituency-level voting in England between 2005 and 2017, patterns of voting confirm the relevance of identifying new categories of social class alongside traditional political divides. Labour has had increased appeal to voters who work in areas central to the modern British economy, and at the same time in larger metropolitan centres and economically dynamic university towns. On the other hand, the Conservative voter base has been seen to increase in less populated, less ethnically diverse areas, where voters are more engaged in industries such as manufacturing.

=== Overall ===
Election results plotted on a map showing equal-size constituencies, showing winning party in each.

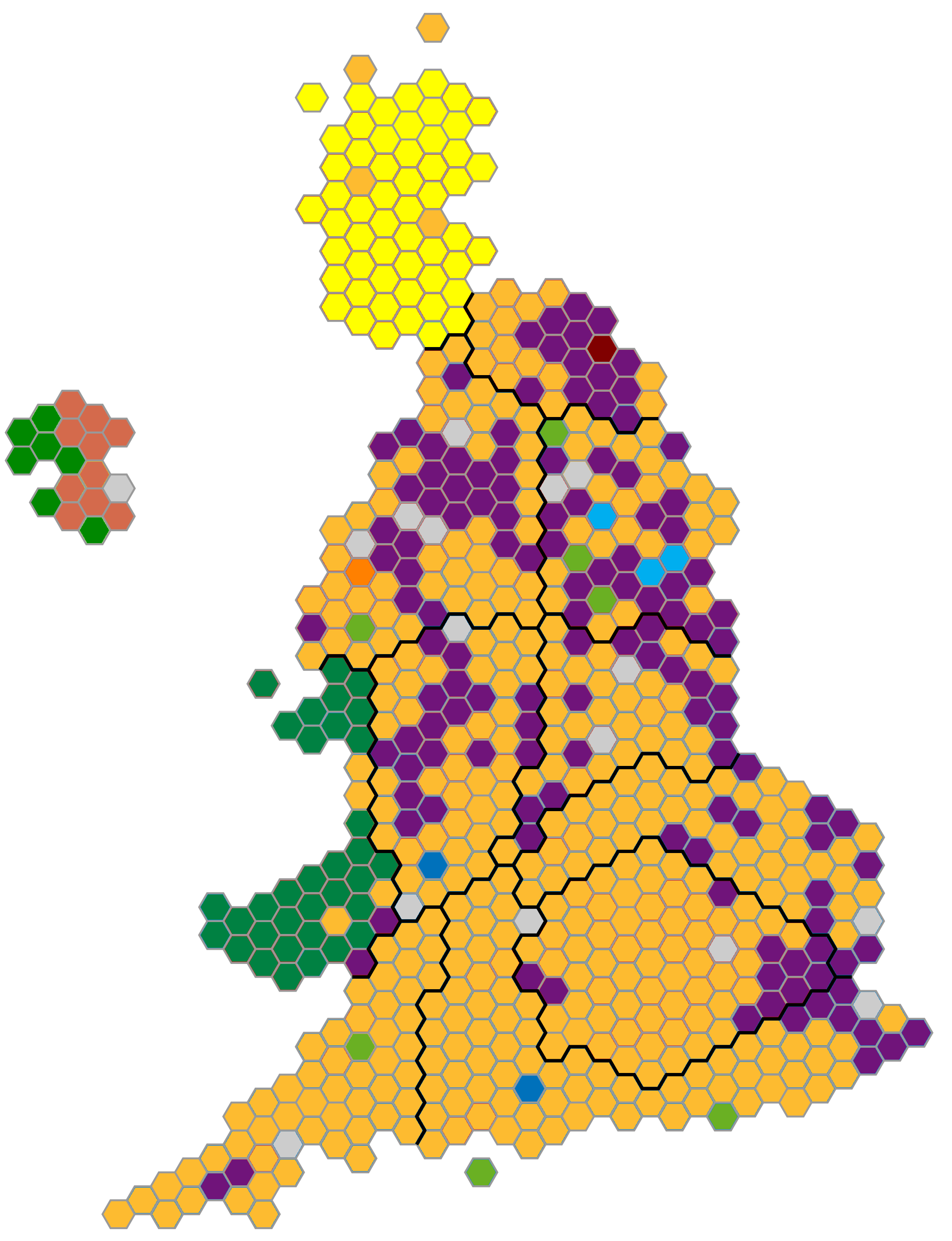
Election results showing the best-performing party in each constituency, other than Conservative or Labour.

==== Summary ====

After all 650 constituencies had been declared, the results were:

Party	Leader	MPs			Votes	
Party	Leader		Of total			Of total
Conservative Party	Theresa May	317	48.8%	317 / 650	13,636,684	42.3%
Labour Party	Jeremy Corbyn	262	40.3%	262 / 650	12,877,918	40.0%
Scottish National Party	Nicola Sturgeon	35	5.4%	35 / 650	977,568	3.0%
Liberal Democrats	Tim Farron	12	1.8%	12 / 650	2,371,861	7.4%
Democratic Unionist Party	Arlene Foster	10	1.5%	10 / 650	292,316	0.9%
Sinn Féin	Michelle O'Neill	7	1.1%	7 / 650	238,915	0.7%
Plaid Cymru	Leanne Wood	4	0.6%	4 / 650	164,466	0.5%
Green Party of England and Wales	Jonathan Bartley; Caroline Lucas	1	0.2%	1 / 650	512,327	1.6%
Speaker	John Bercow	1	0.2%	1 / 650	34,299	0.1%
Independent	Sylvia Hermon	1	0.2%	1 / 650	16,148	0.05%

==== Full results ====
Results of the June 2017 House of Commons of the United Kingdom results
Political party	Leader	MPs						Votes		
Political party	Leader	Candidates	Total	Gained	Lost	Net	Of total (%)	Total	Of total (%)	Change (%)
Conservative	Theresa May	638	317	20	33	−13	48.8	13,636,684	42.3	+5.5
Labour	Jeremy Corbyn	631 (Note: Includes 52 Co-operative Party candidates, as part of the Labour-Co-op alliance)	262 (Note: Includes 38 Co-operative Party MPs, as part of the Labour-Co-op alliance)	36 (Note: Includes 14 Co-operative Party MPs, as part of the Labour-Co-op alliance)	6	+30 (Note: Includes +14 Co-operative Party MPs, as part of the Labour-Co-op alliance)	40.3 (Note: Includes 5.8% for the Co-operative Party, as part of the Labour-Co-op alliance)	12,877,918 (Note: Includes 1,350,007 for the Co-operative Party, as part of the Labour-Co-op alliance)	40.0 (Note: Includes 4.2% for the Co-operative Party, as part of the Labour-Co-op alliance)	+9.6 (Note: Includes +1.4% for the Co-operative Party, as part of the Labour-Co-op alliance)
Liberal Democrats	Tim Farron	629	12	8	4	+4	1.8	2,371,861	7.4	−0.5
SNP	Nicola Sturgeon	59	35	0	21	−21	5.4	977,568	3.0	−1.7
UKIP	Paul Nuttall	378	0	0	1	−1	0	594,068	1.8	−10.8
Green Party of England and Wales	Caroline Lucas and Jonathan Bartley	457	1	0	0	0	0.2	512,327	1.6	−2.0
DUP	Arlene Foster	17	10	2	0	+2	1.5	292,316	0.9	+0.3
Sinn Féin	Gerry Adams	18	7	3	0	+3	1.1	238,915	0.7	+0.1
Plaid Cymru	Leanne Wood	40	4	1	0	+1	0.6	164,466	0.5	−0.1
Independent		187	1	0	0	0	0.2	151,471	0.5	+0.2
SDLP	Colum Eastwood	18	0	0	3	−3	0	95,419	0.3	0.0
UUP	Robin Swann	14	0	0	2	−2	0	83,280	0.3	−0.1
Alliance	Naomi Long	18	0	0	0	0	0	64,553	0.2	0.0
Speaker	John Bercow	1	1	0	0	0	0.2	34,299	0.1	0.0
Yorkshire	Stewart Arnold	21	0	0	0	0	0	20,958	0.1	+0.1
NHA	Alex Ashman	5	0	0	0	0	0	16,119	0.1	−0.1
Green Party Northern Ireland	Steven Agnew	7	0	0	0	0	0	7,452	0.0	0.0
Scottish Green Party	Patrick Harvie and Maggie Chapman	3	0	0	0	0	0	5,886	0.0	−0.1
CPA	Sidney Cordle	31	0	0	0	0	0	5,869	0.0	0.0
People Before Profit	Eamonn McCann	2	0	0	0	0	0	5,509	0.0	0.0
Ashfield Independents		1	0	0	0	0	0	4,612	0.0	0.0
BNP	Adam Walker	10	0	0	0	0	0	4,580	0.0	0.0
Monster Raving Loony	Alan Hope	12	0	0	0	0	0	3,890	0.0	0.0
Liberal	Steve Radford	4	0	0	0	0	0	3,672	0.0	0.0
Women's Equality	Sophie Walker	7	0	0	0	0	0	3,580	0.0	0.0
TUV	Jim Allister	1	0	0	0	0	0	3,282	0.0	−0.1
North East Party	Mary Cartwright	1	0	0	0	0	0	2,355	0.0	0.0
Pirate	David A Elston	10	0	0	0	0	0	2,321	0.0	0.0
English Democrat	Robin Tilbrook	7	0	0	0	0	0	1,913	0.0	0.0
Christian	Jeff Green	2	0	0	0	0	0	1,720	0.0	0.0
Independent Save Withybush Save Lives		1	0	0	0	0	0	1,209	0.0	0.0
Socialist Labour	Arthur Scargill	3	0	0	0	0	0	1,154	0.0	0.0
Animal Welfare	Vanessa Hudson	4	0	0	0	0	0	955	0.0	0.0
JAC		2	0	0	0	0	0	842	0.0	0.0
Southampton Independents		1	0	0	0	0	0	816	0.0	0.0
Workers Revolutionary	Sheila Torrance	5	0	0	0	0	0	771	0.0	0.0
Workers' Party		2	0	0	0	0	0	708	0.0	0.0
Something New		2	0	0	0	0	0	552	0.0	0.0
Demos Direct Initiative Party		1	0	0	0	0	0	551	0.0	0.0
Libertarian	Adam Brown	4	0	0	0	0	0	524	0.0	0.0
SDP	Peter Johnson	6	0	0	0	0	0	469	0.0	0.0
Peace	John Morris	2	0	0	0	0	0	468	0.0	0.0
Friends Party		3	0	0	0	0	0	435	0.0	0.0
Better for Bradford		1	0	0	0	0	0	420	0.0	0.0
All other parties		38	0	0	0	0	0	5,447	0.0	0.0
Total		3,304	650					32,204,184		

Seats, of total, by party
1. Conservative (48.8%)
2. Labour (40.3%)
3. SNP (5.40%)
4. Liberal Democrats (1.80%)
5. DUP (1.50%)
6. Sinn Féin (1.10%)
7. Plaid Cymru (0.60%)
8. Green (0.20%)
9. Speaker (0.20%)
10. Independent (0.20%)
Votes, of total, by party
1. Conservative (42.3%)
2. Labour (40.0%)
3. Liberal Democrats (7.40%)
4. SNP (3.00%)
5. UKIP (1.80%)
6. Green (1.60%)
7. DUP (0.90%)
8. Sinn Féin (0.70%)
9. Plaid Cymru (0.50%)
10. Other (1.80%)

All parties with over 400 votes shown.

Vote share
Conservative	42.3%
Labour	40.0%
Liberal Democrat	7.4%
Scottish National	3.0%
UK Independence	1.8%
Green	1.6%
Democratic Unionist	0.9%
Sinn Féin	0.7%
Plaid Cymru	0.5%
Others	1.8%

Parliamentary seats
Conservative	48.8%
Labour	40.3%
Scottish National	5.4%
Liberal Democrat	1.8%
Democratic Unionist	1.5%
Sinn Féin	1.1%
Plaid Cymru	0.6%
Green	0.2%
Speaker	0.2%
Independent	0.2%

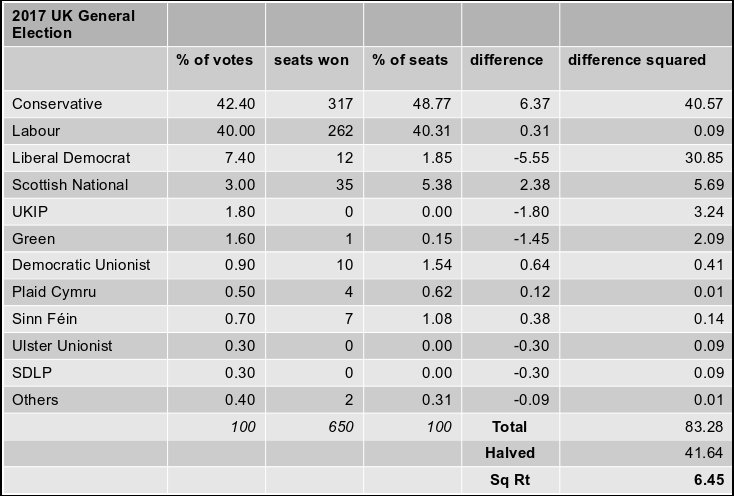
The disproportionality of parliament in the 2017 election was 6.45 using the Gallagher Index.

=== Voter demographics ===
==== Ipsos MORI ====
Ipsos MORI polling after the election suggested the following demographic breakdown:

The 2017 UK general election vote in Great Britain
Social group	Con	Lab	Lib Dem	UKIP	Others	Lead
Total vote	44	41	8	2	5	3
Gender
Male	44	40	7	2	7	4
Female	43	42	8	1	6	1
Age
18–24	27	62	5	2	4	35
25–34	27	56	9	1	7	29
35–44	33	49	10	1	7	16
45–54	43	40	7	2	8	3
55–64	51	34	7	2	6	17
65+	61	25	7	3	4	36
Men by age
18–24	36	52	5	1	6	16
25–34	30	54	8	1	7	24
35–54	40	42	8	2	8	2
55+	56	30	6	3	5	26
Women by age
18–24	18	73	5	2	2	55
25–34	24	58	10	2	6	34
35–54	37	46	8	1	8	9
55+	58	27	8	1	6	31
Social class
AB	47	37	10	1	5	10
C1	44	40	7	2	7	4
C2	45	41	6	2	6	4
DE	38	47	5	3	7	9
Men by social class
AB	50	34	10	1	5	16
C1	43	40	8	2	7	3
C2	45	41	5	3	6	4
DE	36	48	4	5	7	12
Women by social class
AB	43	40	11	1	5	3
C1	44	40	7	2	7	4
C2	45	42	7	1	5	3
DE	38	47	6	2	7	9
Housing tenure
Owned	55	30	7	2	6	25
Mortgage	43	40	9	2	6	3
Social renter	26	57	4	4	9	31
Private renter	31	54	7	1	7	23
Ethnic group
White	45	39	8	2	6	6
BME	19	73	6	0	2	54
Qualifications
No qualifications	52	35	4	4	5	17
Other qualifications	46	39	6	2	7	7
Degree or higher	33	48	12	0	7	15
EU referendum vote
Remain	26	54	13	0	7	28
Leave	65	24	2	4	5	41
Did not vote	23	66	4	1	6	43
2015 general election vote
Conservative	87	8	3	0	2	79
Labour	7	88	3	0	2	81
Lib Dem	15	30	51	0	4	21
UKIP	60	16	1	18	4	42
Aged 18–34 by social class
AB	31	52	10	1	6	21
C1	27	58	7	1	7	31
C2	27	62	6	0	5	35
DE	18	70	4	4	4	52
Aged 35–54 by social class
AB	45	38	11	1	5	7
C1	38	43	8	1	10	5
C2	40	44	5	3	8	4
DE	27	55	6	3	9	28
Aged 55+ by social class
AB	61	24	10	1	4	37
C1	60	25	7	3	5	35
C2	59	28	6	2	5	31
DE	49	37	5	3	6	12

==== YouGov ====
YouGov polling after the election suggested the following demographic breakdown:

The 2017 UK general election vote in Great Britain
Social group	Con	Lab	Lib Dem	SNP	UKIP	Green	Plaid	Others
Total vote	44	41	8	3	2	2	0	1
Gender
Male	45	43	7	4	2	2	0	1
Female	43	43	7	3	1	2	0	1
Age
18–19	19	66	9	2	1	2	0	1
20–24	22	62	9	3	1	2	1	0
25–29	23	63	7	3	1	2	0	0
30–39	29	55	8	4	1	2	0	0
40–49	39	44	8	4	2	2	0	1
50–59	47	37	7	4	3	2	0	1
60–69	58	27	7	3	2	1	0	1
70+	69	19	7	2	2	1	0	1
Social class
AB	46	38	10	3	1	2	0	1
C1	41	43	8	4	1	2	0	1
C2	47	40	6	3	2	1	0	1
DE	41	44	5	4	4	2	0	1
Highest educational level
GCSE or lower	55	33	5	2	3	1	0	1
Medium	45	39	7	4	2	1	0	1
High (degree or above)	32	49	11	4	1	2	0	1
Housing status
Own	53	31	8	3	2	1	0	1
Rent	32	51	6	5	3	2	0	1
Neither	32	51	9	4	1	2	0	1
Work sector
Private sector	50	34	7	3	2	1	0	1
Public sector	39	44	8	4	2	2	1	1
Work status
Full-time	39	45	8	4	2	2	0	1
Part-time	40	44	8	3	2	2	0	1
Student	19	64	10	4	1	2	0	1
Retired	63	24	7	3	2	1	0	1
Unemployed	28	54	6	4	4	2	1	1
Not working	36	48	6	4	3	1	0	1
Other	30	55	6	4	2	2	0	1
Newspaper read most often
Daily Express	77	15	2	0	3	2	0	0
Daily Mail	74	17	3	1	3	1	0	1
Daily Mirror	19	68	3	6	2	1	0	1
Daily Star	38	49	6	3	3	1	0	0
The Sun	59	30	3	3	3	1	0	1
The Daily Telegraph	79	12	6	0	1	1	0	1
The Financial Times	40	39	14	1	2	3	0	1
The Guardian	8	73	12	3	0	3	0	1
The Independent	15	66	12	3	1	2	0	1
The Times	58	24	14	1	1	2	0	1

== Open seats changing hands ==
Party	Candidate	Incumbent retiring from the House	Constituency	Defeated by	Party
Independent	Paul Oakley (UKIP)	Douglas Carswell (elected as UKIP) (Note: Carswell was elected as a UKIP MP in 2015 after defecting from the Conservatives in 2014. He left UKIP in 2017 to sit as an independent, and chose not to stand again.)	Clacton	Giles Watling	Conservative
Independent	Toni Giugliano (SNP)	Michelle Thomson (elected as SNP) (Note: Thomson was elected as an SNP MP in 2015, but resigned from the party whip and gave up her SNP membership later that year, following the announcement of a police inquiry into allegations made against her.)	Edinburgh West	Christine Jardine	Liberal Democrats
Labour	Tracey Harvey	Tom Blenkinsop	Middlesbrough South and East Cleveland	Simon Clarke	Conservative
Liberal Democrats	Sue McGuire	John Pugh	Southport	Damien Moore	Conservative

=== Seats which changed allegiance ===
Conservative to Labour (28)

- Battersea
- Bedford
- Brighton Kemptown
- Bristol North West
- Bury North
- Canterbury
- Cardiff North
- Colne Valley
- Crewe and Nantwich
- Croydon Central
- Derby North
- Enfield Southgate
- Gower
- High Peak
- Ipswich
- Keighley
- Kensington
- Lincoln
- Peterborough
- Plymouth Sutton and Devonport
- Portsmouth South
- Reading East
- Stockton South
- Stroud
- Vale of Clwyd
- Warrington South
- Warwick and Leamington
- Weaver Vale

SNP to Conservative (12)

- Aberdeen South
- Aberdeenshire West & Kincardine
- Angus
- Ayr, Carrick and Cumnock
- Banff and Buchan
- Berwickshire, Roxburgh and Selkirk
- Dumfries and Galloway
- East Renfrewshire
- Gordon
- Moray
- Ochil and South Perthshire
- Stirling

SNP to Labour (6)

- Coatbridge, Chryston and Bellshill
- East Lothian
- Glasgow North East
- Kirkcaldy and Cowdenbeath
- Midlothian
- Rutherglen and Hamilton West

Labour to Conservative (6)

- Copeland (Note: The seat had already been gained at a by-election in February. Gains at a general election are normally contrasted to the previous general election, ignoring by-elections in between.)
- Derbyshire North East
- Mansfield
- Middlesbrough South and Cleveland East
- Stoke-on-Trent South
- Walsall North

Conservative to Liberal Democrat (5)

- Bath
- Eastbourne
- Kingston and Surbiton
- Oxford West and Abingdon
- Twickenham

SNP to Liberal Democrat (3)

- Caithness, Sutherland and Easter Ross
- East Dunbartonshire
- Edinburgh West

Liberal Democrat to Labour (2)

- Leeds North West
- Sheffield Hallam

SDLP to Sinn Féin (2)

- Foyle
- South Down

Other changes (6)

- Belfast South (SDLP to Democratic Unionist)
- Ceredigion (Liberal Democrat to Plaid Cymru)
- Clacton (UKIP to Conservative)
- Fermanagh and South Tyrone (Ulster Unionist to Sinn Féin)
- South Antrim (Ulster Unionist to Democratic Unionist)
- Southport (Liberal Democrat to Conservative)

== Aftermath ==
=== Government formation ===
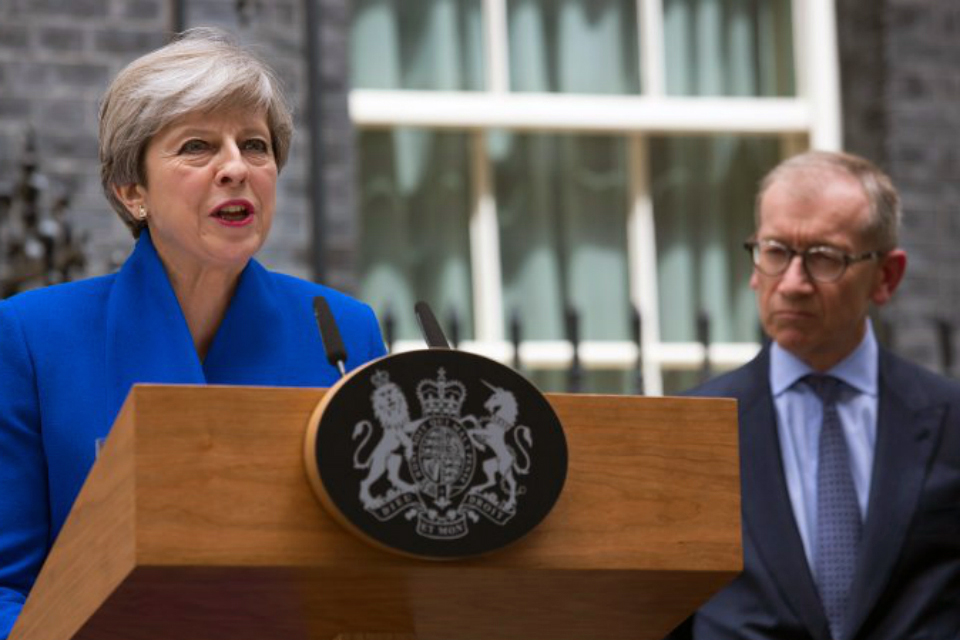
Theresa May declares her intention to remain in office following the election result outside 10 Downing Street, 9 June 2017

Corbyn and Farron called on May to resign. On 9 June, May apologised to candidates who lost their seats and confirmed she would continue as party leader and prime minister, with the intention of forming a minority government with support from the Democratic Unionist Party to ensure "certainty". By convention, when no party has a majority, the incumbent prime minister has the first opportunity to garner enough support to govern.

May's joint chiefs of staff Nick Timothy and Fiona Hill resigned, replaced by Gavin Barwell, who had lost his seat in the election.

On 10 June, a survey of 1,500 ConservativeHome readers found that almost two-thirds of Conservative Party members wanted Theresa May to resign. A YouGov poll of 1,720 adults for The Sunday Times had 48% saying Theresa May should resign, with 38% against. A Survation poll of 1,036 adults online for The Mail on Sunday showed 49% of people wanting her resignation, with 38% against. On 11 June George Osborne, former Chancellor of the Exchequer, described May as a "dead woman walking".

In a post-election reshuffle carried out on 11 June, May promoted her close ally Damian Green to become First Secretary of State and brought Michael Gove into the cabinet as Environment Secretary, making Andrea Leadsom Leader of the House of Commons. Liz Truss, David Lidington and David Gauke changed roles, while eleven cabinet members including key figures such as Boris Johnson, Amber Rudd, Michael Fallon, Philip Hammond and David Davis remained in post.

Negotiations between the Conservatives and the DUP began on 9 June. On 12 June, it was reported that the State Opening of Parliament, scheduled for 19 June, could be delayed. DUP sources informed the BBC that the Grenfell Tower fire on 14 June would delay finalisation of an agreement. On 15 June, it was announced that the Queen's Speech would occur on 21 June. A confidence and supply deal was reached on 26 June, with the DUP backing the Conservatives in key votes in the House of Commons over the course of the parliament. The agreement included additional funding of £1 billion for Northern Ireland, highlighted mutual support for Brexit and national security, expressed commitment to the Good Friday Agreement, and indicated that policies such as the state pension triple lock and Winter Fuel Payments would be maintained. Various commentators suggested that this raised problems for the UK government's role as a neutral arbiter in Northern Ireland, as is required under the Good Friday Agreement.

In April 2020, Sky News's Tom Rayner and The Independent's Jon Stone reported on an 860-page dossier into the handing of allegations of antisemitism by Labour members and officials. Stone stated that the right wing of the party weaponised claims of antisemitism—amongst other things—in an active attempt to undermine Corbyn and prevent Labour from winning the 2017 election in the hope that a poor result would trigger a leadership contest to remove Corbyn as leader.

=== Party leadership changes ===
After achieving just 1.8% of the popular vote, down from 12.7% in 2015, and failing to win any seats, Paul Nuttall resigned as UKIP leader on 9 June. A leadership election followed.

Ian Blackford became the new SNP leader in Westminster on 14 June, following Angus Robertson's defeat.

Also on 14 June, Brian Paddick resigned as home affairs spokesperson for the Liberal Democrats over concerns about Farron's "views on various issues" during the campaign. Later that day Farron announced his resignation as leader of the Liberal Democrats, citing conflict between his Christian faith and serving as leader. He remained as leader until Sir Vince Cable was elected unopposed on 20 July.

=== Campaign post-mortems ===
Figures inside and outside the Conservative Party criticised its campaign widely. Points of criticism included the initial decision to call the election (which Lynton Crosby had advised against); the control of the campaign by a small team of May's joint chiefs of staff Nick Timothy and Fiona Hill, who were more experienced with policy work than campaigning; the presidential style of the campaign focusing on the figure of Theresa May, while most of the Cabinet were sidelined (particularly the exclusion of Chancellor of the Exchequer Philip Hammond, with reports that May would sack him following the election); and a poorly designed manifesto that offered little hope and the contents of which were not shared with Cabinet members until shortly before its release. In July, Prime Minister Theresa May admitted she had "shed a tear" upon seeing the election exit poll, and suggested the manifesto's lack of appeal to younger voters had played a part in Conservative shortcomings.

=== Allegations of Russian interference ===
In 2018, an investigation by Swansea University and The Sunday Times revealed that 6,500 Russian Twitter accounts, at least many of which were bots, supported Labour, denigrated Conservatives, and reached millions of voters. Their intention was to swing the elections for Labour. Labour's Shadow Chancellor John McDonnell dismissed the claims as "ludicrous", "farcical" and a "classic Sunday Times smear campaign" and further said: "If there's an issue here about anything with Russian influence in our society, it's about Russian oligarchs funding the Tory party – let's have an inquiry into that."

=== Election turnout figures ===
A January 2018 report in The Times reported that researchers at Oxford University and the University of Manchester have found that election turnout in June 2017 was actually in the high 70s per cent and could have been as high as 80.3 per cent, partly because those with second homes and students are registered twice, and partly also because of entries there by mistake or because of voter fraud. By overestimating the number of registered voters, official sources underestimated the proportion of the electorate that voted. Turnout in the 2017 election is likely to have been roughly 78 per cent. A spokesman for the Election Commission said officials would "consider this report's findings on the calculation of election turnout figures". The commission "continues to work to improve the accuracy and completeness" of the electoral register, he added.

== Donations ==
Electoral commission data shows that in 2017 Q2, total donations for each major political party, over £7,500, are as follows:

Party	Donations (£)
Conservatives	25,346,680
Labour Party	9,745,745
SNP	971,342
Liberal Democrats	5,058,175

== See also ==
- 2017 United Kingdom general election in England
- 2017 United Kingdom general election in Northern Ireland
- 2017 United Kingdom general election in Scotland
- 2017 United Kingdom general election in Wales
- Results breakdown of the 2017 United Kingdom general election
- Results of the 2017 United Kingdom general election
- 2010s in political history
