= Conspiracies against the laity =

Term coined by George Bernard Shaw in 1906

Conspiracies against the laity is a term coined by George Bernard Shaw in his 1906 play The Doctor's Dilemma. The conspiracies refer to the methods used by professions to acquire prestige, power and wealth.

On the subject of such conspiracies, Tim Harford argued the following in his 2006 book The Undercover Economist, that "doctors, actuaries, accountants and lawyers manage to maintain high wages through... erecting virtual 'green belts' to make it hard for competitors to set up shop. Typical virtual green belts will include very long qualification periods and professional bodies that give their approval only to a certain number of candidates per year. Many of the organisations that are put forth to protect us from 'unqualified' professionals in fact serve to maintain the high rates of the 'qualified' to whom we are directed."

Shaw's sentiments echo Adam Smith's earlier writing: "People of the same trade seldom meet together, even for merriment and diversion, but the conversation ends in a conspiracy against the public, or in some contrivance to raise prices."
