= More or Less (radio programme) =

- Running time: 30 minutes (nominal) & 9 minutes
- Country of origin: United Kingdom
- Language: English
- Home station: BBC Radio 4 BBC World Service
- Hosted by: Tim Harford (since 2007)
- Created by: Michael Blastland
- Produced by: Charlotte McDonald
- Edited by: Richard Vadon
- Original release: Current
- Website: Web site
- Podcast: BBC podcast

More or Less is an investigative BBC Radio 4 programme about the accuracy of numbers and statistics in the public domain. The programme often addresses statistical issues which pertain to topics in the news.

The programme was created in 2001 by Michael Blastland as a one-off series of six programmes presented by Andrew Dilnot. The positive response to the show led to its becoming a regular programme, first with two series a year and since the winter series of 2008–2009, with three.

As well as the 30-minute Radio 4 programme, there is also a nine-minute BBC World Service edition that runs throughout the year. Both versions appear in the programme's podcast stream. The World Service edition either repeats an item from Radio 4 or has original material (usually when the Radio 4 show is off air). The programme is normally broadcast (as at September 2020) 9:02 to 9:30am on Wednesday.

In 2007, Blastland and Dilnot published a related book, The Tiger That Isn't: Seeing Through a World of Numbers about misuse of statistics.

Guests of the show have included Angus Deaton, Mark Lynas, Hannah Ritchie, and Richard Blundell.

Since October 2007 the show has been presented by Tim Harford.

== Awards ==
- Royal Statistical Society's 2010 award for statistical excellence in broadcast journalism
- Mensa's award for promoting intelligence in public life
