= The Logic of Life =

2008 economics book by Tim Harford

- Front cover
- Author: Tim Harford
- Language: English
- Publisher: Random House (United States); Little Brown (United Kingdom)
- Publication date: 2008-01-15 (United States); 2008-01-25 (United Kingdom)
- Publication place: United States, United Kingdom
- Media type: Print (Hardback)
- Pages: 272 pp (hardback, United States), 288 pp (hardback, United Kingdom)
- ISBN: 978-1-4000-6642-1 (hardback, United States), ISBN 978-0-316-02756-4 (hardback, United Kingdom)

The Logic of Life: The Rational Economics of an Irrational World is a book by Tim Harford published in 2008 by Random House. Harford argues that rational behavior is more widespread than expected in the larger population. He uses economic principles to draw forth the rational elements of supposedly illogical behaviors to illustrate his point.

== Overwhelming gain paradox ==
The overwhelming gain paradox is a paradox of reasoning that is referred to in the book.

Harford illustrates the paradox by the comparison of three potential job offers:

- In Job 1, you will be paid $100, and if you work hard you will be paid $200.
- In Job 2, you will be paid $100, and if you work hard you will have a 1% chance of being paid $200.
- In Job 3, you will be paid $100, and if you work hard you will have a 1% chance of being paid $1 billion.

Most people will state that they will choose to work hard in jobs 1 and 3, but not job 2. In Job 1, working hard is obvious because there is a clear reward for doing so. In Job 2, it seems a bad choice because the likelihood of a reward is so low. But in Job 3, working hard becomes the preferable choice, because the potential gain is so overwhelming that any chance - no matter how small - of obtaining it is seen as worthwhile. This appears irrational and paradoxical, because jobs 2 and 3 are identical 99% of the time.

Harford uses the Overwhelming Gain Paradox to explain the high salaries of certain professionals, such as bankers, executives and entertainers. He argues that the process of preparing for and getting many of these jobs requires extremely hard work with little or no guarantee of reward - usually due to low market demand, or uncertainty. Thus, the rewards for these jobs are set high as the result of a rational choice to exploit the overwhelming gain paradox; were it not for this, most jobs in this category would be seen as resembling job 2, making it unlikely anyone would aspire to them at all, or work hard enough to potentially qualify for them. The exploitation of the paradox also has negative consequences: the resulting high number of aspirants raises levels of competition, and the presence of the paradox amplifies irrational behavior in job hunting; but these are seen as preferable to these jobs attracting no interest at all.

== See also ==
- The Undercover Economist (2006)
