= Tim Harford =

British economic journalist

Tim Harford OBE FSS
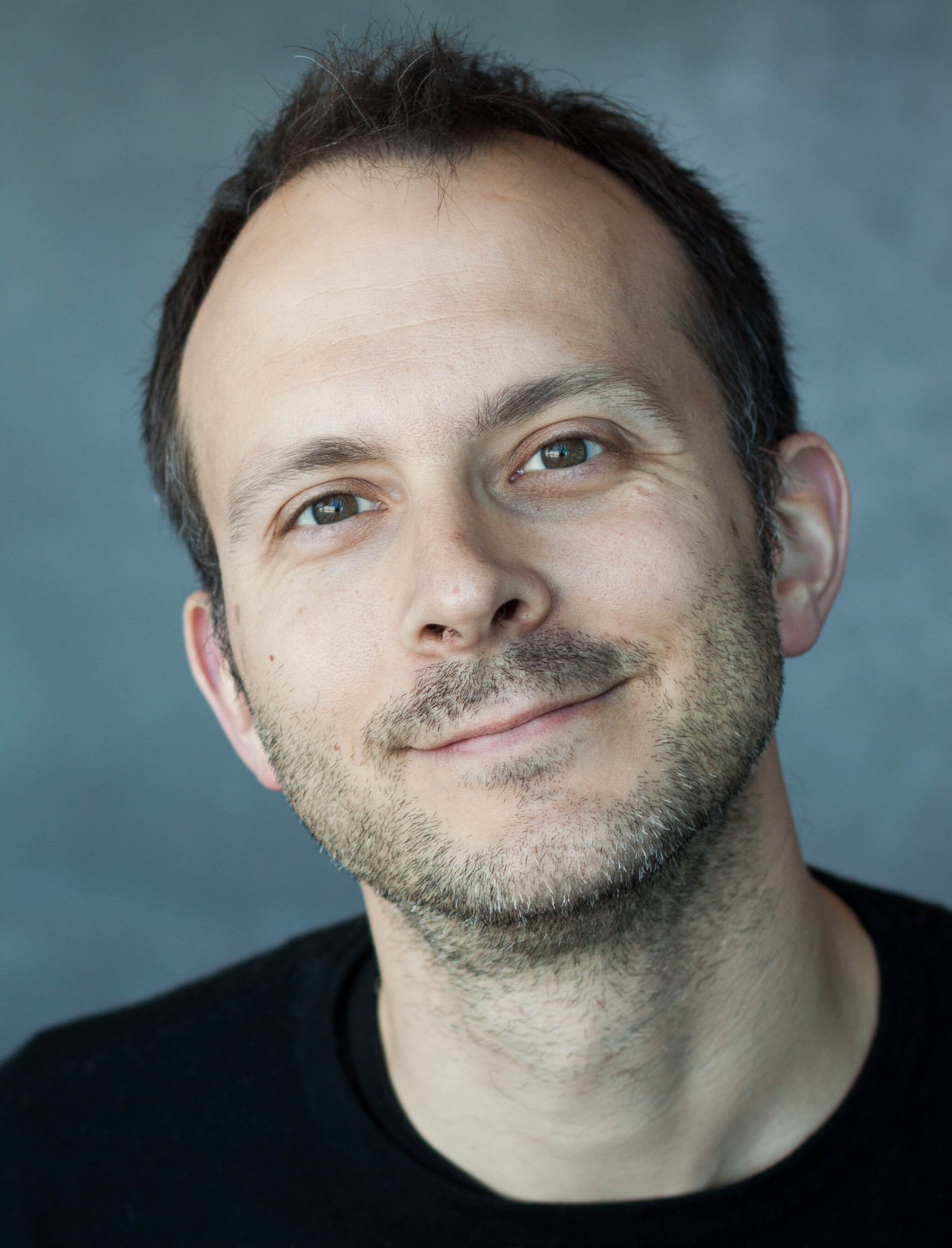
- Harford in 2012
- Born: Timothy Douglas Harford; 27 September 1973 (age 53); Kent
- Citizenship: United Kingdom
- Education: Aylesbury Grammar School
- Alma mater: University of Oxford
- Employer(s): BBC; Financial Times; International Finance Corporation
- Known for: The Undercover Economist; More or Less
- Awards: Bastiat Prize (2007)
- Website: timharford.com

Timothy Douglas Harford, OBE (born 27 September 1973) is an English economic journalist who lives in Oxford. Harford is the author of four economics books and writes his long-running Financial Times column, The Undercover Economist, syndicated in Slate magazine, which explores the economic ideas behind everyday experiences. His column in the Financial Times, Since You Asked, ran between 2011 and 2014 and offered a sceptical look at the news of the week.

Since October 2007 Harford has presented the BBC Radio 4 programme More or Less. The series segments are also available as podcasts. Subsequently, Harford launched his own podcast on the podcast production network Pushkin Industries, called Cautionary Tales.

== Education ==
Harford was born in Kent. He was educated at Aylesbury Grammar School and at Brasenose College, Oxford, obtaining a Bachelor of Arts degree in Philosophy, Politics and Economics (PPE) and then a Master of Philosophy in economics, in 1998. Harford said that he originally planned to drop economics when studying towards his undergraduate degree but that his economics tutor Peter Sinclair convinced him otherwise.

== Career ==
Harford joined the Financial Times in 2003 on a fellowship in commemoration of business columnist Peter Martin. He continued to write his financial column after joining International Finance Corporation in 2004, and he rejoined the Financial Times as economics lead writer in April 2006. He is also a member of the newspaper's editorial board.

Tim has spoken at TED, PopTech and the Sydney Opera House. He is a visiting fellow at Nuffield College, Oxford and an honorary fellow of the Royal Statistical Society (FSS).

In August 2007, he presented a television series on the BBC, Trust Me, I'm an Economist. In October 2007, Harford replaced Andrew Dilnot on the BBC Radio 4 series More or Less. From November 2016, he presented an economic history documentary radio and podcast series 50 Things That Made the Modern Economy. Since November 2019, he has been presenting the podcast series Cautionary Tales. On 13 November 2020 he started a new podcast series on COVID-19 Vaccination called How to Vaccinate the World.

Harford is managed by the agency Knight Ayton.

=== Awards ===
- Harford was awarded the Bastiat Prize for economic journalism in 2007 (shared with Jamie Whyte). In 2010 he again drew with Whyte, in second place.
- Harford was appointed Officer of the Order of the British Empire (OBE) in the 2019 New Year Honours for services to Improving Economic Understanding

=== Publications ===
- The Market for Aid
- The Undercover Economist
- The Logic of Life
- Dear Undercover Economist: Priceless Advice on Money, Work, Sex, Kids, and Life's Other Challenges
- Adapt: Why Success Always Starts with Failure
- The Undercover Economist Strikes Back: How to Run – or Ruin – an Economy
- Messy: The Power of Disorder to Transform Our Lives
- Fifty Things That Made the Modern Economy
- The Next Fifty Things that Made the Modern Economy
- How to Make the World Add Up: Ten Rules for Thinking Differently About Numbers published in North America as: The Data Detective: Ten Easy Rules to Make Sense of Statistics

== Personal life ==
Harford lives in Oxford with his wife and three children.
