= The Tiger That Isn't =

Statistics book by Michael Blastland and Andrew Dilnot

- Book cover
- Author: Michael Blastland & Andrew Dilnot
- Language: English
- Genre: Statistics
- Publisher: Profile Books
- Publication date: 2007
- Publication place: United Kingdom
- ISBN: 978-1-86197-839-4

The Tiger That Isn't: Seeing Through a World of Numbers is a statistics book written by Michael Blastland and Andrew Dilnot, the creator and presenter of BBC Radio 4's More or Less. Like the radio show, it addresses the misuse of statistics in politics and the media.

The book has received favourable reviews for the simple presentation of complicated ideas.
