= The Undercover Economist =

Book by Tim Harford

- Front cover
- Author: Tim Harford
- Original title: The Undercover Economist: Exposing Why the Rich Are Rich, the Poor Are Poor--and Why You Can Never Buy a Decent Used Car!
- Language: English
- Genre: Non-fiction, economics
- Publisher: Little, Brown
- Publication date: 3 November 2005
- Publication place: United Kingdom
- Media type: Print (hardback)
- Pages: 288 pp (hardback)
- ISBN: 0-19-518977-9 (hardback)
- OCLC: 59098699
- Dewey Decimal: 330.9/0511 22
- LC Class: HC59.15 .H35 2006

The Undercover Economist (ISBN 0-19-518977-9) (ISBN 0345494016) is a book by Tim Harford published in 2005 by Little, Brown.

The book provides an introduction to principles of economics, including demand-supply interactions, market failures, externalities, globalisation, international trade and comparative advantage. It explains in non-technical terms how Starbucks and other coffee providers price their products, why it is hard to buy a decent used car, why the health insurance system in the United States is failing, and why poor countries remain poor while the People's Republic of China has continuously grown rich in the last couple of decades.

Freakonomics author Steven Levitt called it "a rare specimen: a book on economics that will enthrall...Beautifully written and argued, it brings the power of economics to life."

== See also ==
- The Logic of Life – 2008 economics book by Tim Harford
