= Spreadex =

British gambling company

- Type: Private limited company
- Industry: Finance, Gambling
- Founded: 25th February 1999
- Headquarters: Churchill House, 26-30 Upper Marlborough Road, St Albans, Hertfordshire, England
- Products: Financial spread betting Sports spread betting Fixed-odds betting Casino
- Website: www.spreadex.com

Spreadex Limited is a British company that provides sports betting and financial trading services. Its product include sports spread betting, fixed-odds betting, financial spread betting and contracts for difference. The company was incorporated in 1999 and is headquartered in St Albans, Hertfordshire.

== History ==
Spreadex was founded in 1999 by Jonathan Hufford, a former City of London dealer. The company was initially based in Dunstable, Bedfordshire, and later relocated to St Albans, Hertfordshire.

Spreadex launched an online sports betting service in 2006 and later introduced an online financial trading platform. In 2010, it added fixed-odds sporting betting.

Spreadex appeared in the Sunday Times PwC Profit Track 100 in 2006, 2007, and 2008.

In 2011, Spreadex acquire the majority of the client list relating to IG Group's Extrabet sports business. In 2012, it purchased the client database of MF Global Spreads. In 2013, it acquired the non-equities financial betting customer base of Cantor Index.

In 2013, Spreadex signed a private-cloud agreement with Computacenter. The company later moved its registered office to Churchill House in St Albans.

In 2017, Spreadex was included in the Financial Times list of Europe's 1,000 fastest-growing companies.

In 2021, Jonathan Hufford stepped down from his executive role and remained on the board as a non-executive director.

In April 2024, the Competition and Markets Authority referred Spreadex's acquisition of Sporting Index's business-to-consumer arm for an in-depth investigation. In July 2024, the CMA published provisional findings that the transaction raised competition concerns in the supply of licensed online sports spread betting services in the United Kingdom.

In May 2024, Spreadex made its spread-betting products available through TradingView.

In March 2025, the Competition Appeal Tribunal quashed the CMA's 2024 Phase 2 decision and referred the case back to the CMA for reconsideration. In September 2025, the CMA published its remittal final report and again concluded that the acquisition created competition concerns in the UK licensed online sports spread betting market. In October 2025, the CMA accepted final undertakings requiring the divestment of the Sporting Index business.

In May 2026, the CMA updated the remedy group overseeing the case.

== Operations ==
Spreadex operates in sports betting and financial trading. Its services are available online and by telephone.

The company's sports-betting products include sports spread betting and fixed-odds betting.

Spreadex financial trading products include financial spread betting and contracts for difference across asset classes such as indices, shares, foreign exchange. commodities and bonds.

Spreadex's casino and fixed-odds betting offering is regulated by the Gambling Commission. Its financial trading and financial spread betting products are regulated by the Financial Conduct Authority.

== Regulatory Action ==
In May 2025, the Gambling Commission imposed a 2.022 million pounds penalty on Spreadex Limited after finding anti-money laundering and social responsibility failings. The Commission also issues a warning and added an additional condition to the company's operating license requiring a third-party audit.
