= Andrew Dilnot =

British economist and broadcaster

Sir Andrew Dilnot CBE HonFBA
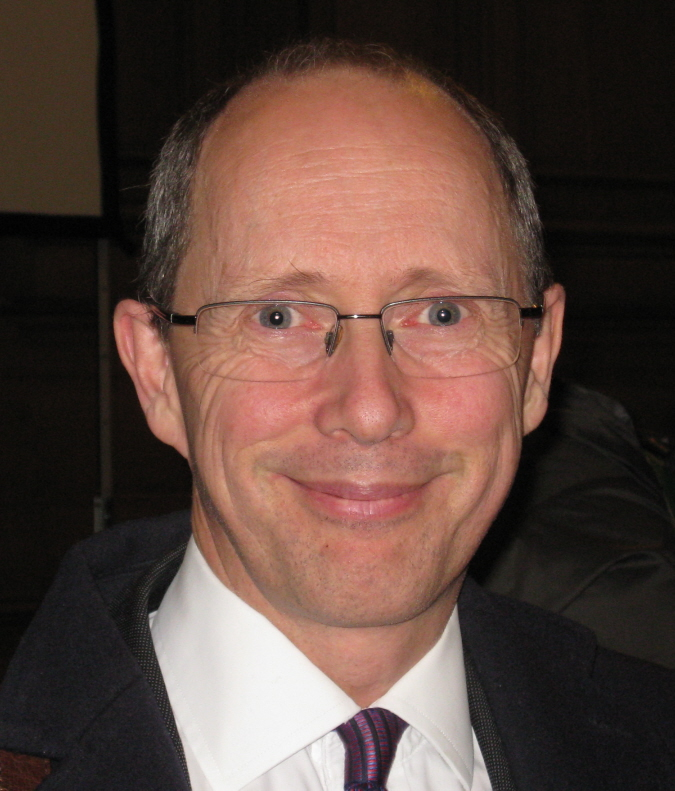
- Sir Andrew Dilnot, Nov 2014

Warden of Nuffield College, Oxford
- In office 2012–2024
- Preceded by: Sir Stephen Nickell
- Succeeded by: Julia Black

Principal of St Hugh's College, Oxford
- In office 2002–2012
- Preceded by: Derek Wood KC
- Succeeded by: Lady Elish Angiolini KC

Chair, UK Statistics Authority
- In office April 2012 – March 2017
- Prime Minister: David Cameron; Theresa May
- Preceded by: Michael Scholar
- Succeeded by: David Norgrove

Personal details
- Born: Andrew William Dilnot; 18 June 1960 (age 66) Swansea, Wales
- Citizenship: United Kingdom
- Education: Olchfa School; St John's College, Oxford
- Profession: Economist
- Notable works: The Tiger That Isn't (2007); The Numbers Game (2008)

Sir Andrew William Dilnot, CBE (born 19 June 1960), is a British economist and broadcaster. He was director of the Institute for Fiscal Studies from 1991 to 2002, Principal of St Hugh's College, Oxford from 2002 to 2012, and Warden of Nuffield College, Oxford from 2012 to 2024. He served as Chair of the UK Statistics Authority from April 2012 until March 2017.

== Early life and education ==
Dilnot attended Maidstone Grammar School for one year before moving to Swansea and attending Olchfa School. He studied Philosophy, Politics, and Economics at St John's College, Oxford.

== Career ==
Dilnot was director of the Institute for Fiscal Studies from 1991 to 2002.

Dilnot was a presenter on BBC Radio 4's programme about statistics More or Less. Many of the items on the programme deal with the misuse and fabrication of statistics. Dilnot and Michael Blastland wrote The Tiger That Isn't, which was based on More or Less.

Dilnot became principal of St Hugh's College in 2002, then the only head of house at an Oxford college educated at a comprehensive school. He became a Pro Vice-Chancellor of Oxford University in 2005.

On 16 March 2011, it was announced that "with very mixed emotions" Dilnot was to leave St Hugh's College in September 2012 to become warden of Nuffield College, Oxford, "which will allow me to spend much more time doing economics again." He retired in 2024.

In 2011, the government nominated Dilnot to be Chair of the UK Statistics Authority. Parliament formally endorsed the appointment on 13 December 2011. Andrew Dilnot is no longer chair of the authority, having stood down in 2017.

In 2018, Dilnot was appointed Chair of the Geospatial Commission, supported by £80 million of new funding, to drive the use of location-linked data more productively.

In 2019, Dilnot became chair of the Health Foundation's oversight board for the REAL Centre (formerly Health and Social Care Sustainability Research Centre), which was set up to help health and social care policymakers consider long-term implications of their funding, design and delivery decisions.

Dilnot has served on the Social Security Advisory Committee, the National Consumer Council, the Councils of the Royal Economic Society and Queen Mary and Westfield College, as a trustee of the Nuffield Foundation, and as chairman of the Statistics Users Forum of the Royal Statistical Society.

== Commission on Funding of Care and Support ==
In June 2010, Dilnot was asked by the government to chair the Commission on Funding of Care and Support. He took a sabbatical from St Hugh's College from March to July 2011.

The commission published its report in July 2011. The commission's primary recommendation was to limit individuals' contribution to social care costs to £35,000, after which the state would pay. Currently, individuals who do not fit means-tested criteria can be liable for unlimited costs.

The commission's report was welcomed by Health Secretary Andrew Lansley, and both David Cameron and Ed Miliband called for cross-party talks on the issue.

== Honours ==
Dilnot was appointed Commander of the Order of the British Empire (CBE) in the 2000 Birthday Honours and knighted in the 2013 Birthday Honours for services to Economics and Economic Policy.

He is an Honorary Fellow of St John's College, Oxford, Queen Mary University of London, the Swansea Institute of Higher Education, St Hugh's College, Oxford, Nuffield College, Oxford and the Institute of Actuaries, and holds honorary doctorates from City University, the Open University and a City and Guilds Fellowship.

He was awarded an Honorary Fellowship by the British Academy in July 2018.
