= 2015 United Kingdom general election =

- 7 May 2015

All 650 seats in the House of Commons 326 (Note: Given that Sinn Féin members of Parliament (MPs) practise abstentionism and do not take their seats, while the Speaker and deputies do not vote, the number of MPs needed for a majority was in practice slightly lower. Sinn Féin won 4 seats, meaning a practical majority required 324 MPs.) seats needed for a majority
- Opinion polls
- Registered: 46,354,197
- Turnout: 30,697,525; 66.4% (▲1.3 pp)

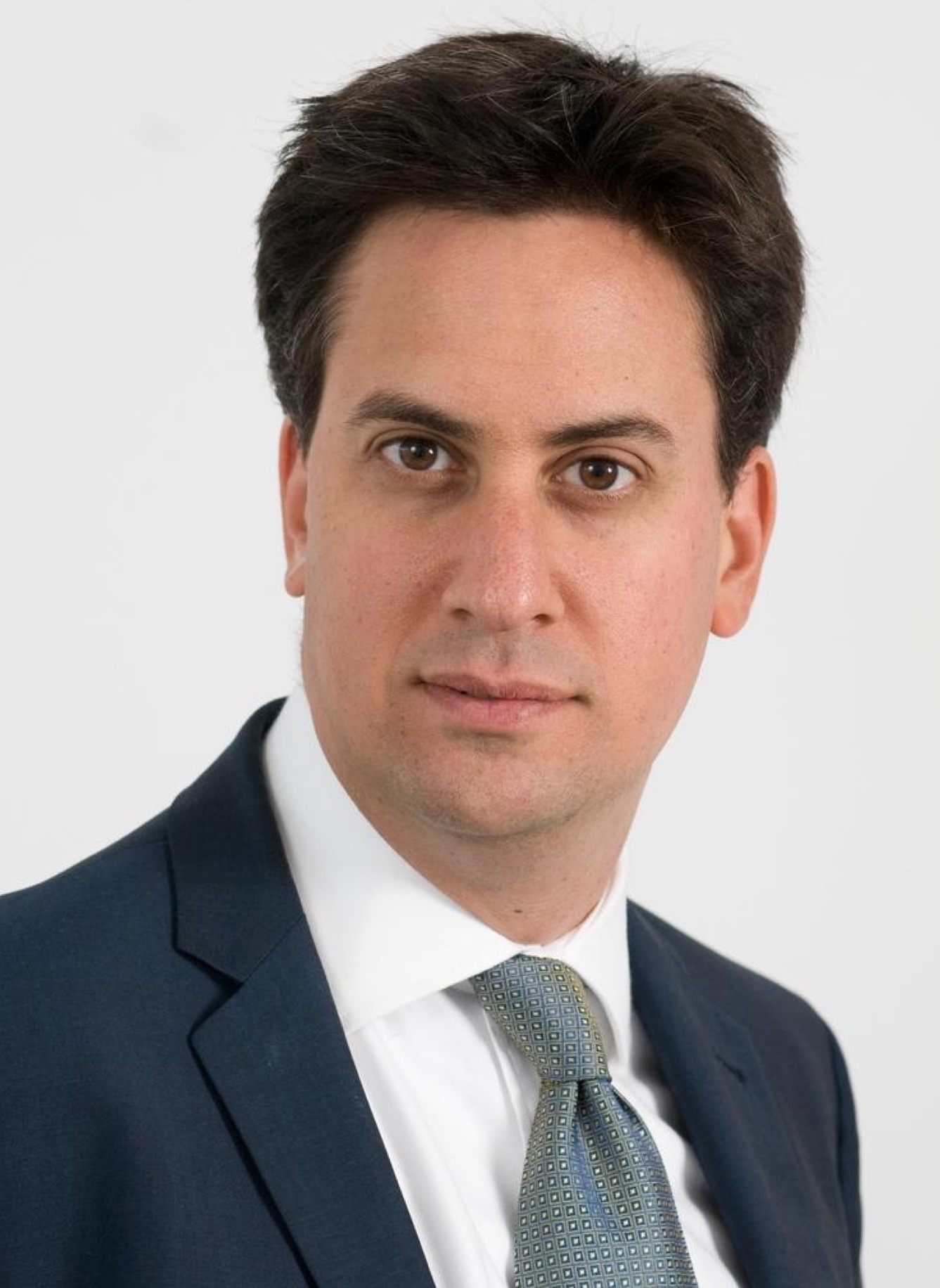

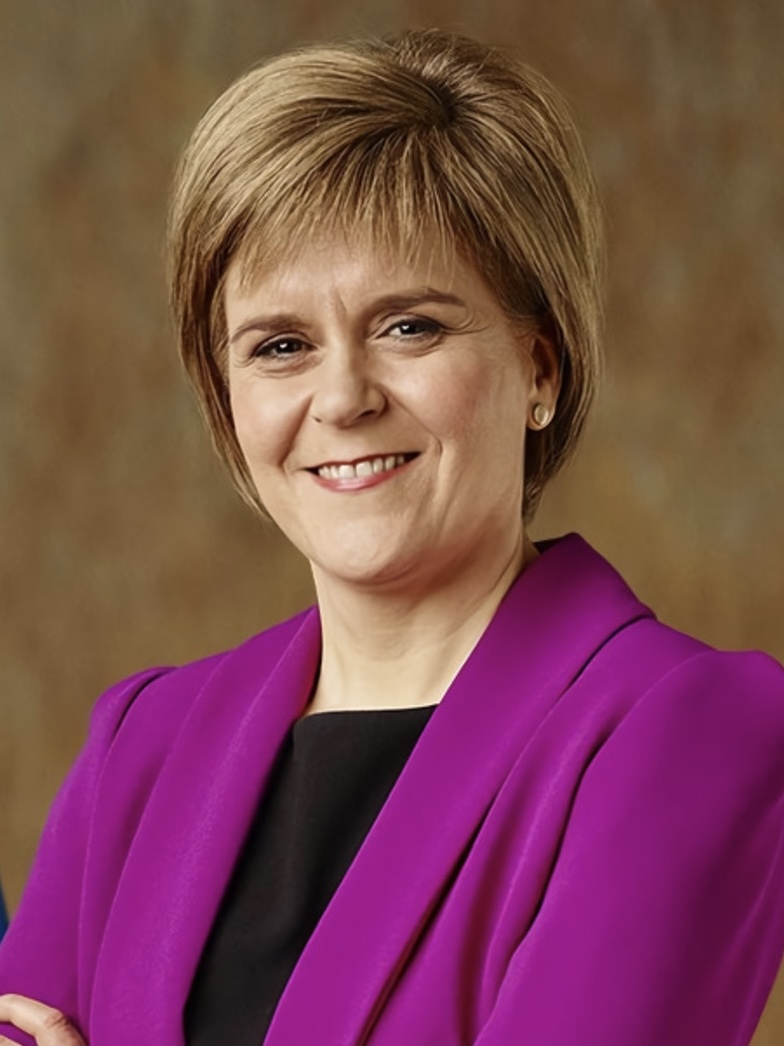

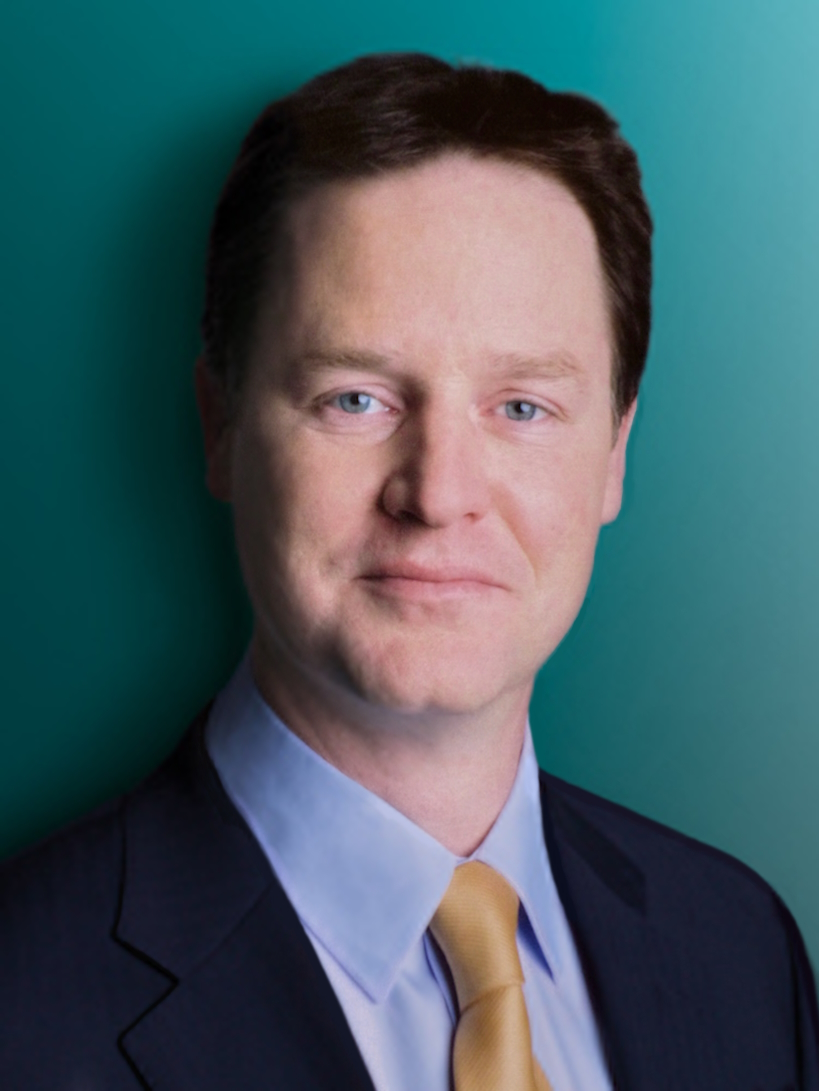
	First party	Second party
Leader	David Cameron	Ed Miliband
Party	Conservative	Labour
Leader since	6 December 2005	25 September 2010
Leader's seat	Witney	Doncaster North
Last election	306 seats, 36.1%	258 seats, 29.0%
Seats before	302	256
Seats won	330 (Note: Does not include the Speaker, John Bercow, who was included in the Conservative totals by some media outlets)	232
Seat change	▲24	▼26
Popular vote	11,334,726	9,347,324
Percentage	36.9%	30.4%
Swing	▲0.8 pp	▲1.5 pp
	Third party	Fourth party
Leader	Nicola Sturgeon	Nick Clegg
Party	SNP	Liberal Democrats
Leader since	14 November 2014	18 December 2007
Leader's seat	Did not stand (Note: SNP party leader Nicola Sturgeon, a Member of the Scottish Parliament and First Minister of Scotland, participated in some of the main UK-wide televised debates, but did not stand for a Commons seat at this election. Angus Robertson, MP for Moray at the time, was the leader of the SNP delegation to the House of Commons.)	Sheffield Hallam
Last election	6 seats, 1.7%	57 seats, 23.0%
Seats before	6	56
Seats won	56	8
Seat change	▲50	▼49
Popular vote	1,454,436	2,415,862
Percentage	4.7%	7.9%
Swing	▲3.1 pp	▼15.2 pp
- Colours denote the winning party, as shown in the main table of results.

- Composition of the House of Commons after the election
Prime Minister before election
David Cameron
Conservative
Prime Minister after election
David Cameron
Conservative

A general election was held in the United Kingdom on 7 May 2015 to elect 650 members of Parliament (MPs) to the House of Commons. The Conservative Party, led by Prime Minister David Cameron, won an unexpected majority victory of 10 seats; they had been leading a coalition government with the Liberal Democrats. It was the last general election to be held before the UK voted to leave the European Union (EU) in June 2016. It was the first of three general elections to be held under the rules of the Fixed-term Parliaments Act 2011. Local elections took place in most areas of England on the same day and is to date the most recent general election to coincide with local elections.

Opinion polls and political commentators had widely predicted that the election would result in a second consecutive hung parliament whose composition would be similar to the one elected at the previous general election in 2010. Potential coalitions and agreements between parties were intensively discussed; as a result, smaller parties received much more attention during the campaign than in previous UK elections. However, opinion polls underestimated the Conservatives, as they won 330 of the 650 seats and 36.9 per cent of the vote, giving them a small overall majority. The opposition Labour Party, led by Ed Miliband, saw a small increase in vote share to 30.4 per cent, but it returned 232 MPs, 26 fewer than in 2010 and their fewest since the 1987 general election, when it had 229 MPs. Labour lost significant ground in Scotland to the Scottish National Party (SNP) who enjoyed a huge surge, winning 56 of the 59 Scottish seats, becoming the third-largest party in the House of Commons and the largest party in Scotland, knocking Labour from the status which it had held since 1964. The Liberal Democrats, junior coalition partners led by Deputy Prime Minister Nick Clegg, suffered heavy losses, losing 49 of their 57 seats. Returning just eight MPs, it was their worst result since 1970 when one of its predecessor parties, the Liberal Party, returned six MPs. Cabinet ministers Vince Cable, Ed Davey, and Danny Alexander lost their seats, whilst Clegg only narrowly held his own seat. The UK Independence Party (UKIP) received 12.6 per cent of the vote, displacing the Liberal Democrats as the third-placed party in terms of popular vote, but won only one seat: Clacton, which they had gained at a by-election six months earlier. They failed to retain their other seat gained in a by-election, Rochester and Strood, and the party's leader, Nigel Farage, ran in South Thanet but did not win the seat. The Green Party of England and Wales won its highest vote share unto that point at 3.8%, and their only MP, Caroline Lucas, retained her seat, Brighton Pavilion. In Northern Ireland, the Democratic Unionist Party remained the largest party, the Ulster Unionist Party returned to the Commons with two seats after a five-year absence, and the Alliance Party lost its only seat of Belfast East, represented by Naomi Long for the party, despite an increase in their vote share. Following the election, Miliband and Clegg resigned their leaderships. Jeremy Corbyn succeeded Miliband as Leader of the Labour Party, while Tim Farron succeeded Clegg as Leader of the Liberal Democrats.

Despite speculation before the election that it would herald a new era of multi-party politics in the UK, it ended-up being the antithesis, marking a return to traditional two-party politics seen throughout the second half of the 20th century; Conservative–Labour domination would continue until the 2024 election. The SNP began a nine-year domination of Scottish Westminster seats. Charles Kennedy, who served as the leader of the Liberal Democrats from 1999 to 2006, made his last public appearance during the election campaign, in which he lost his seat; he died on 1 June 2015.

Notable MPs who retired at this election included former prime minister and Labour leader Gordon Brown, former Chancellor of the Exchequer Alistair Darling, former leader of the opposition and Conservative leader William Hague, and former leader of the Liberal Democrats Menzies Campbell. Notable newcomers to the House of Commons included future prime minister and Labour leader Keir Starmer; future prime minister, Conservative leader and Chancellor of the Exchequer Rishi Sunak, who also succeeded Hague as MP for Richmond (Yorks); future deputy prime minister and deputy Labour leader Angela Rayner, future Shadow Home Secretary Chris Philp, and future SNP Commons leader Ian Blackford. Another future prime minister and Conservative leader, Boris Johnson, who had previously left Parliament in 2008 so he could serve as the mayor of London, returned to Parliament as MP for Uxbridge and South Ruislip.

This remains the most recent general election to be held as the result of the expiry of the five-year parliament term won at the previous general election; all subsequent general elections have been called prior to the legally required date, albeit only by five months in the case of the 2024 election.

== Election process ==
The Fixed-term Parliaments Act 2011 led to the dissolution of the 55th Parliament on 30 March 2015 and the scheduling of the election on 7 May. There were local elections on the same day in all of England, with the exception of Greater London. No elections were scheduled to take place in Scotland, Wales, or Northern Ireland.

All British, Irish, and Commonwealth citizens over the age of 18 and residing in the UK who were not in prison or a mental hospital or a fugitive on the date of the election were permitted to vote. In British general elections, voting takes place in all constituencies in the United Kingdom to elect Members of Parliament to the House of Commons, the lower house of Parliament in the UK. Each constituency elects one MP using the first-past-the-post voting system. If one party obtains a majority (326) of the 650 seats, then that party is entitled to form the government. If no party has a majority, then there is what is known as a hung parliament. In this case, the options for forming the Government are either a minority government (where one party governs alone despite not having the majority of the seats) or a coalition government (where one party governs alongside party in order to get a majority of seats).

Although the Conservative Party planned for the number of constituencies to be reduced from 650 to 600, through the Sixth Periodic Review of Westminster constituencies under the Parliamentary Voting System and Constituencies Act 2011, the review of constituencies and reduction in seats was delayed by the Electoral Registration and Administration Act 2013. The next boundary review was set to take place in 2018, so the 2015 general election was contested using the same constituencies and boundaries as in 2010. Of the 650 constituencies, 533 were in England, 59 were in Scotland, 40 were in Wales and 18 were in Northern Ireland.

In addition, the 2011 Act mandated a referendum in 2011 on changing from the first-past-the-post voting system to an alternative vote system for general elections. The Conservative–Liberal Democrat coalition government agreed to holding a referendum. The referendum was held in May 2011 and resulted in the retention of the existing voting system. Before the previous general election the Liberal Democrats had pledged to change the voting system, and the Labour Party had pledged to hold a referendum on any such change. The Conservatives, however, promised to keep the first-past-the-post system, but to reduce the number of constituencies to 600. Liberal Democrats' plan was to reduce the number of MPs to 500, and for them to be elected using a proportional vote system.

The Government increased the amount of money that parties and candidates were allowed to spend on campaigning during the election by 23%, a move decided against the advice of the Electoral Commission. The election saw the first cap on spending by parties in individual constituencies during the 100 days before Parliament's dissolution on 30 March: £30,700, plus a per-voter allowance of 9p in county constituencies and 6p in borough seats. An additional voter allowance of more than £8,700 is available after the dissolution of Parliament. In total, parties spent £31.1m in the 2010 general election, of which the Conservative Party spent 53%, the Labour Party spent 25% and the Liberal Democrats 15%. This was also the first UK general election to use individual rather than household voter registration.

== Date of the election ==
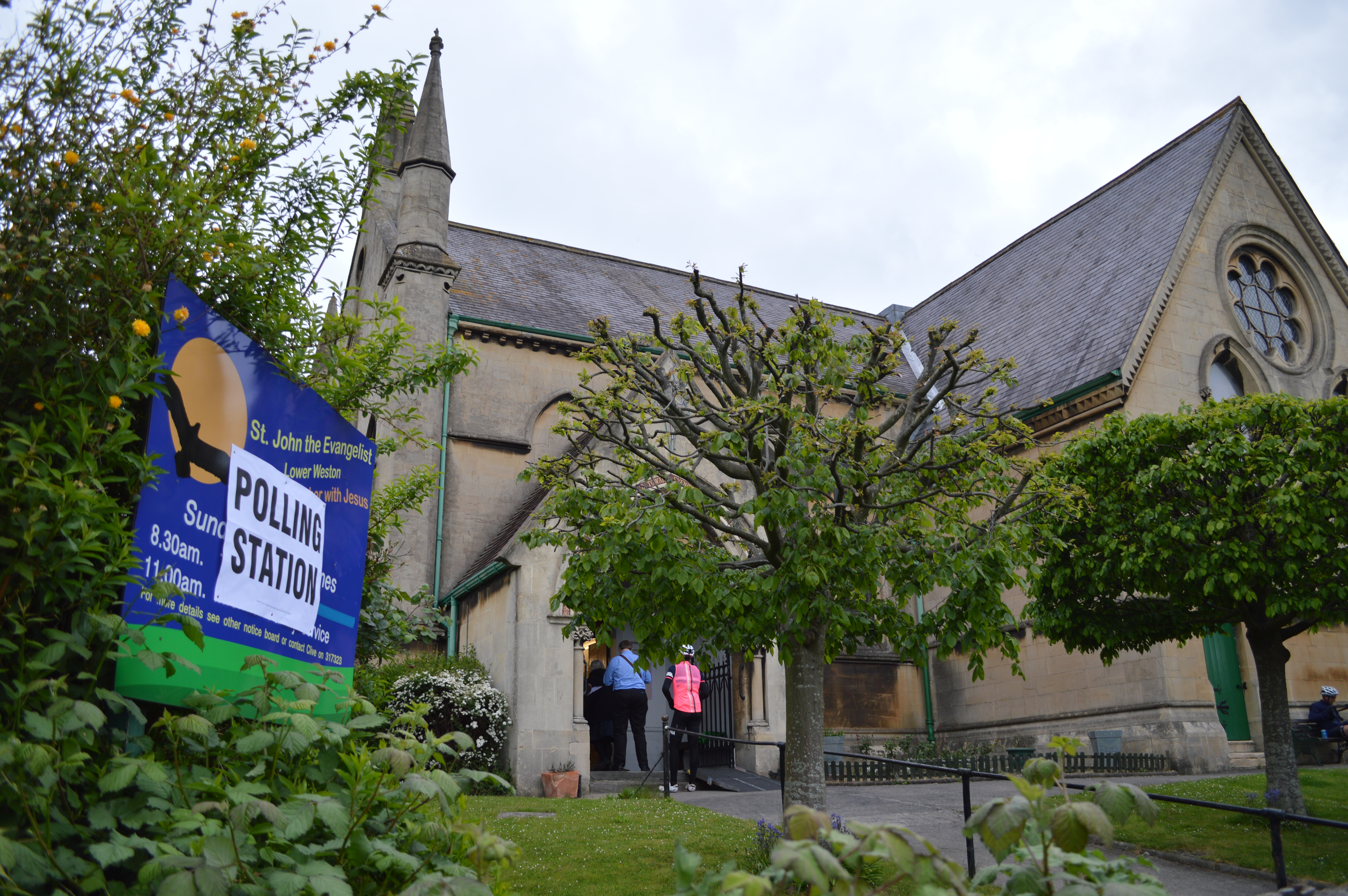
A church used as a polling station in Bath on 7 May 2015.

An election is called following the dissolution of the Parliament of the United Kingdom. The 2015 general election was the first to be held under the provisions of the Fixed-term Parliaments Act 2011. Prior to this, the power to dissolve Parliament was a royal prerogative, exercised by the sovereign on the advice of the prime minister. Under the provisions of the Septennial Act 1715, as amended by the Parliament Act 1911, an election had to be announced on or before the fifth anniversary of the beginning of the previous parliament, barring exceptional circumstances. No sovereign had refused a request for dissolution since the beginning of the 20th century, and the practice had evolved that a prime minister would typically call a general election to be held at a tactically convenient time within the final two years of a Parliament's lifespan, to maximise the chance of an electoral victory for their party.

Prior to the 2010 general election, Labour and the Liberal Democrats pledged to introduce fixed-term elections. As part of the Conservative–Liberal Democrat coalition agreement, the Cameron ministry agreed to support legislation for fixed-term Parliaments, with the date of the next general election being 7 May 2015. This resulted in the Fixed-term Parliaments Act 2011, which removed the prime minister's power to advise the monarch to call an early election. The Act only permits an early dissolution if Parliament votes for one by a two-thirds supermajority, or if a majority of MPs pass a vote of no confidence and no new government is subsequently formed within 14 days. However, the prime minister had the power, by order made by Statutory Instrument under section 1(5) of the Fixed-term Parliaments Act 2011, to fix the polling day to be up to two months later than 7 May 2015. Such a Statutory Instrument must be approved by each House of Parliament. Under section 14 of the Electoral Registration and Administration Act 2013, the Fixed-term Parliaments Act 2011 was amended to extend the period between the dissolution of Parliament and the following general election polling day from 17 to 25 working days. This had the effect of moving forward the date of the dissolution of the Parliament to 30 March 2015.

=== Timetable ===
The key dates were:

Monday 30 March	Dissolution of Parliament and the start of campaigning.
Saturday 2 May	Deadline to file nomination papers, to register to vote, and to request a postal vote.
Thursday 7 May	Date of the election.
Friday 8 May	The Conservative Party wins the election with a majority of 10 seats.
Monday 18 May	New Parliament meets for the first time to elect a Speaker.
Wednesday 27 May	State Opening of Parliament, 2015.

== MPs not standing for re-election ==
While at the previous election there had been a record 149 MPs not standing for re-election, the 2015 election saw 89 MPs standing down. Out of these MPs, 37 were Conservatives, 37 were Labour, 10 were Liberal Democrats, 3 were Independents, 1 was Sinn Féin and 1 was Plaid Cymru. The highest-profile members of parliament leaving were: Gordon Brown, the former Prime Minister, and William Hague, the former Leader of the Conservative Party and Leader of the Opposition. Alongside Brown and Hague, 17 former cabinet ministers stood down at the election, including Stephen Dorrell, Jack Straw, Alistair Darling, David Blunkett, Sir Malcolm Rifkind and Dame Tessa Jowell. The highest-profile Liberal Democrat to stand down was their former leader Sir Menzies Campbell, while the longest-serving MP, Sir Peter Tapsell, also retired, having served as an MP continuously since 1966, or for 49 years.

== Contesting political parties and candidates ==
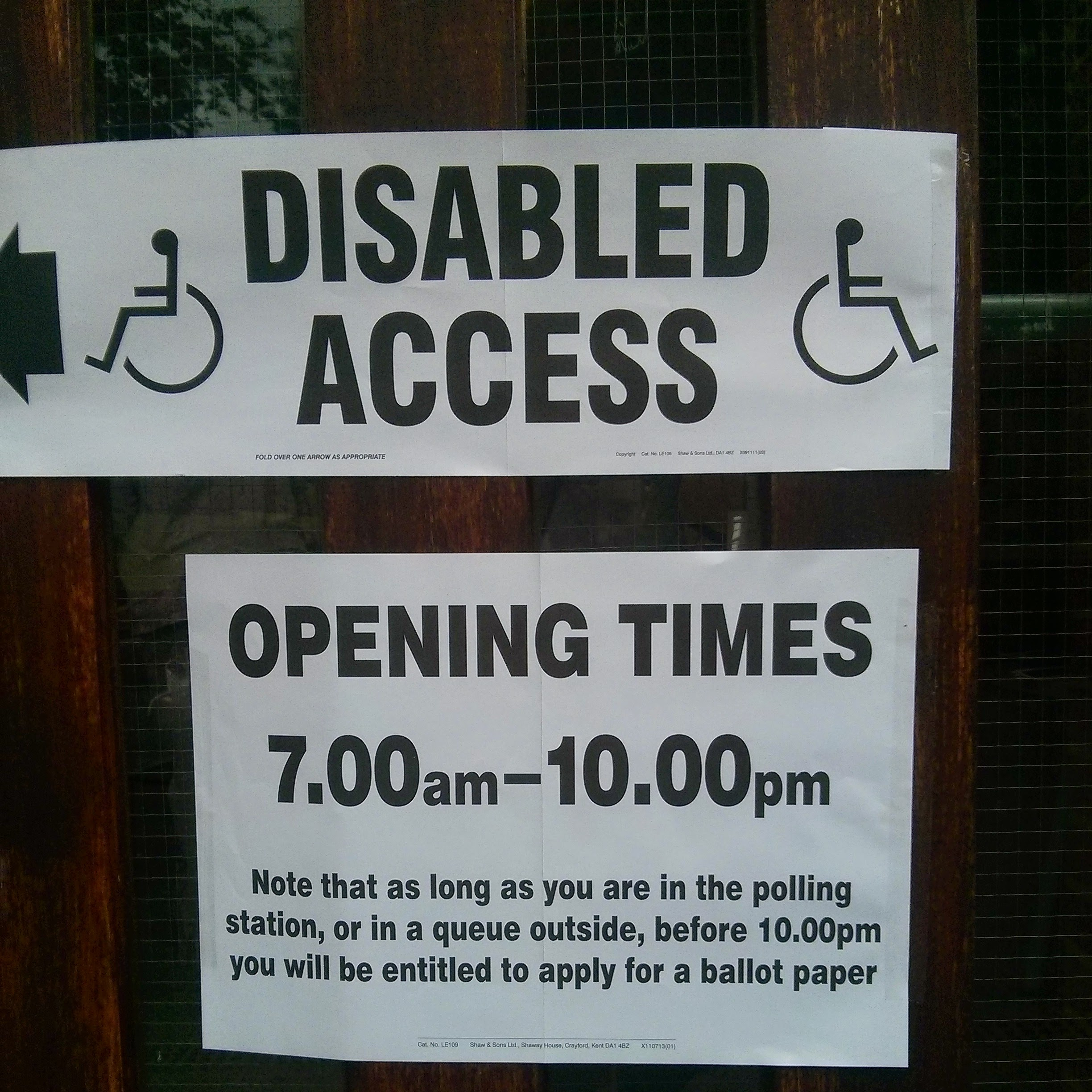
A sign in Woking showing opening hours of polling stations, including the advice that people queuing outside polling stations at 10.00 pm "will be entitled to apply for a ballot paper".

=== Overview ===
On 9 April 2015, the deadline for standing for the general election, there were 464 political parties registered with the Electoral Commission. Candidates who did not belong to a party were either labelled as an independent or not labelled at all.

The Conservative Party and the Labour Party had been the two biggest parties since 1922. Every prime minister to serve since 1935 had been the leader of the Conservatives or Labour. Opinion polls had predicted that the two parties would receive a combined total of anywhere between 65% and 75% of votes, and would receive anywhere between 80% and 85% of the seats; and that, as such, the leader of one of the two parties would become the Prime Minister (David Cameron of the Conservatives or Ed Miliband of Labour) after the election. The Liberal Democrats had been the third largest party in the UK for many years; but as described by various political commentators, other parties had risen relative to the Liberal Democrats since the 2010 election. In order to emphasise this, The Economist stated that "the familiar three-party system of the Tories, Labour, and the Lib Dems appears to be breaking down with the rise of UKIP, the Greens and the SNP." Ofcom ruled that the major parties in Great Britain were the Conservatives, Labour, the Liberal Democrats and UKIP, the SNP a major party in Scotland, and Plaid Cymru a major party in Wales. The BBC's guidelines were similar but removed UKIP from their list of major parties, and instead stated that UKIP should be given "appropriate levels of coverage in output to which the largest parties contribute and, on some occasions, similar levels of coverage". Seven parties participated in the election leadership debates: Conservative, Labour, Liberal Democrat, UKIP, SNP, PC and Green. Northern Ireland's political parties were not included in any debates, despite the DUP, a party based in Northern Ireland, being the fourth largest party in the UK going into the election.

=== National ===
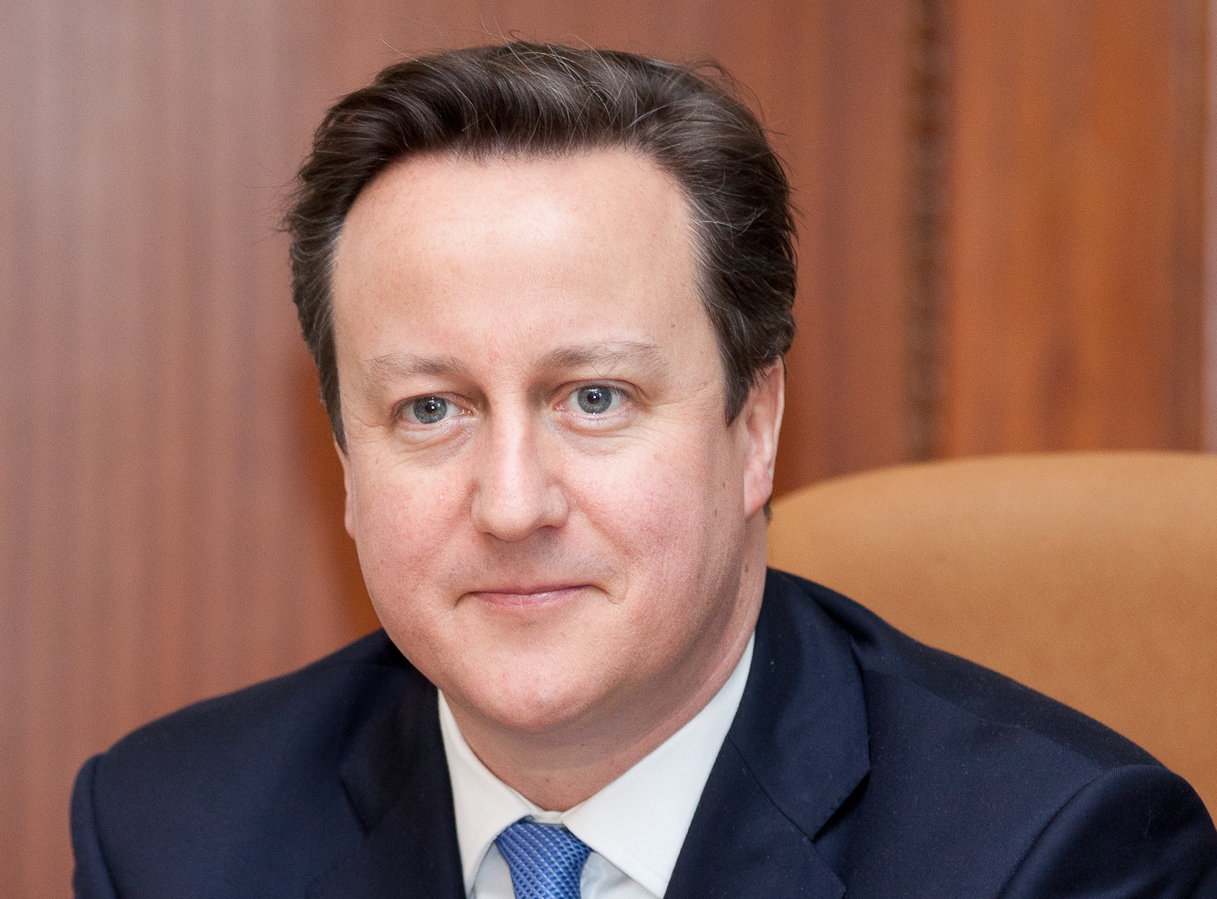
The Conservative Prime Minister David Cameron stood for a second term in office.

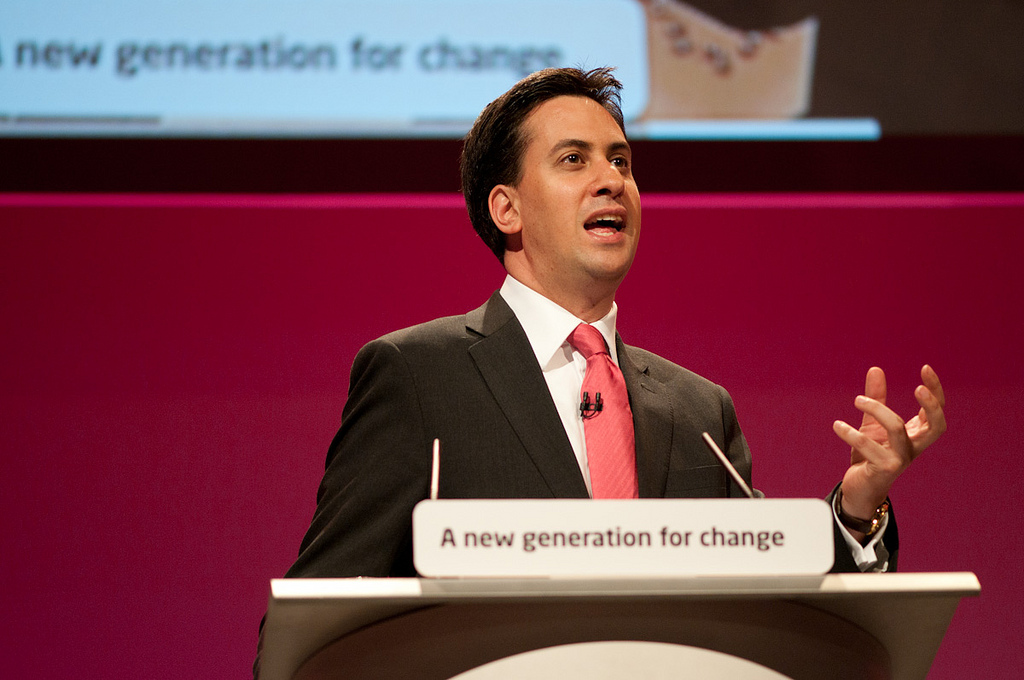
Ed Miliband was leader of the opposition and leader of the Labour Party after winning a leadership election against his brother David Miliband.

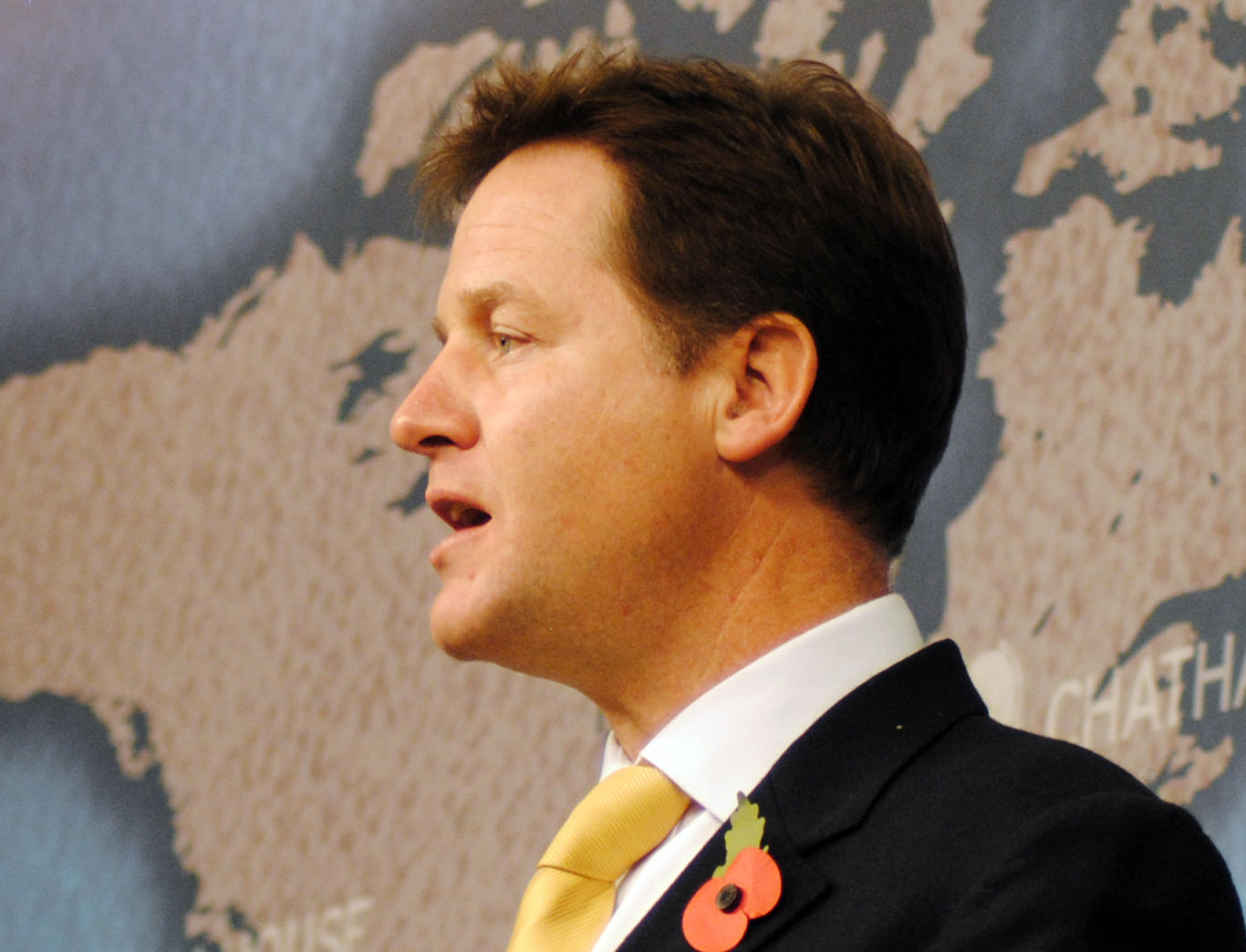
Nick Clegg and the Liberal Democrats showed a great fall in the polls after entering a coalition government with the Conservatives.

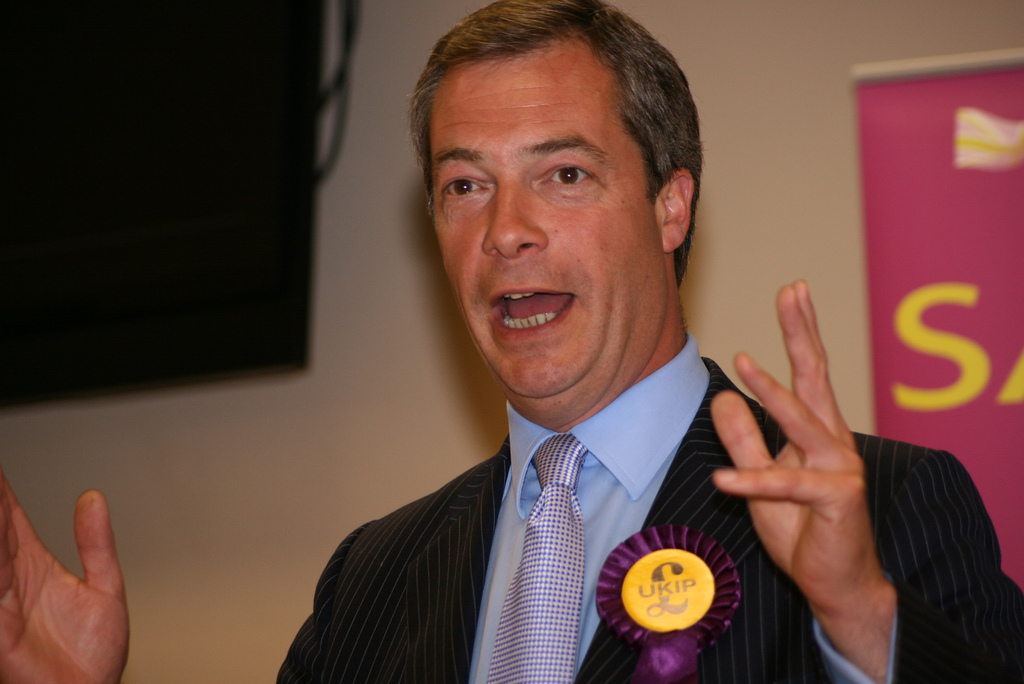
UK Independence Party leader Nigel Farage stood in the South Thanet constituency.

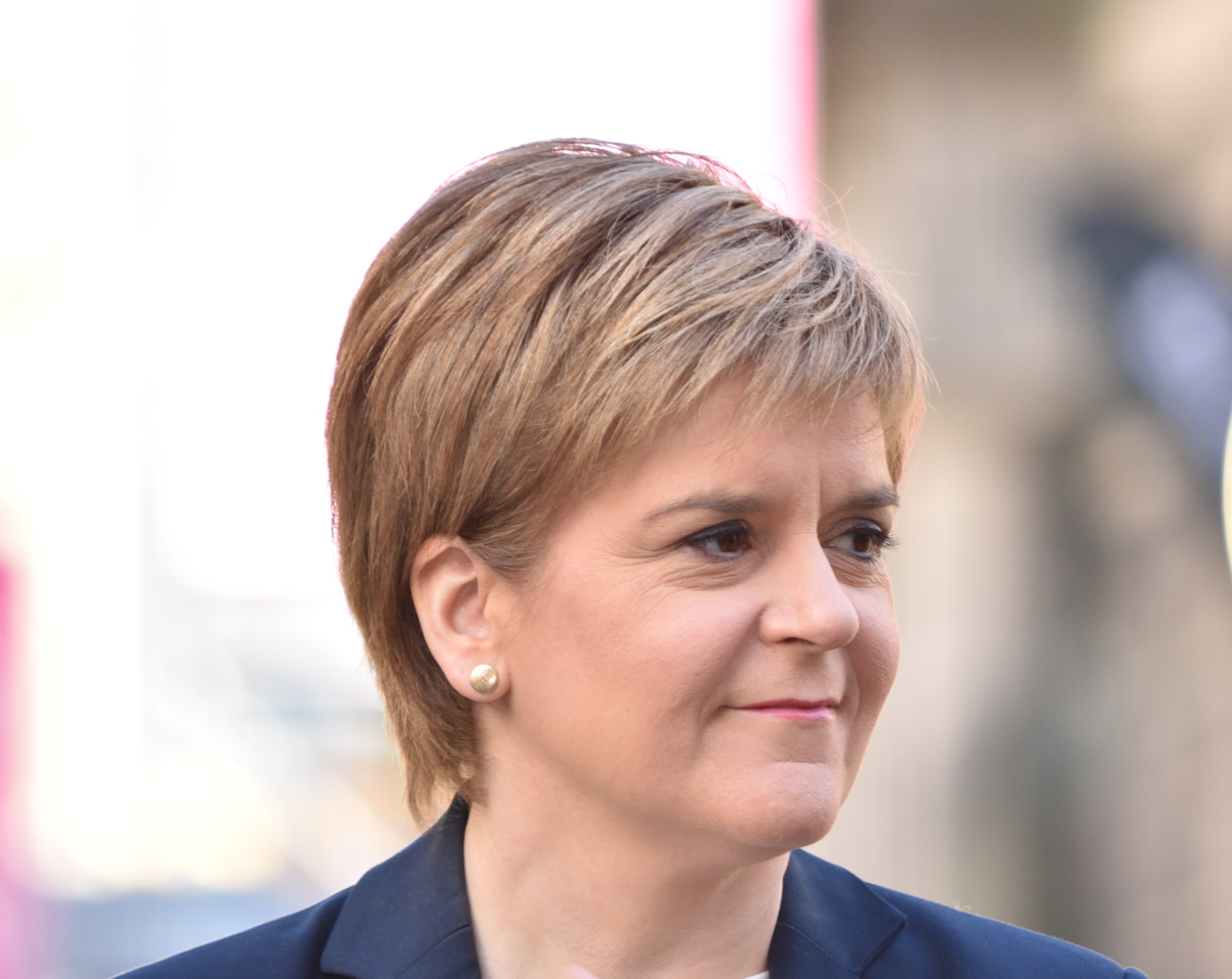
Nicola Sturgeon was the fifth First Minister of Scotland and the leader of the Scottish National Party, in office since 2014. She is the first woman to hold either position.

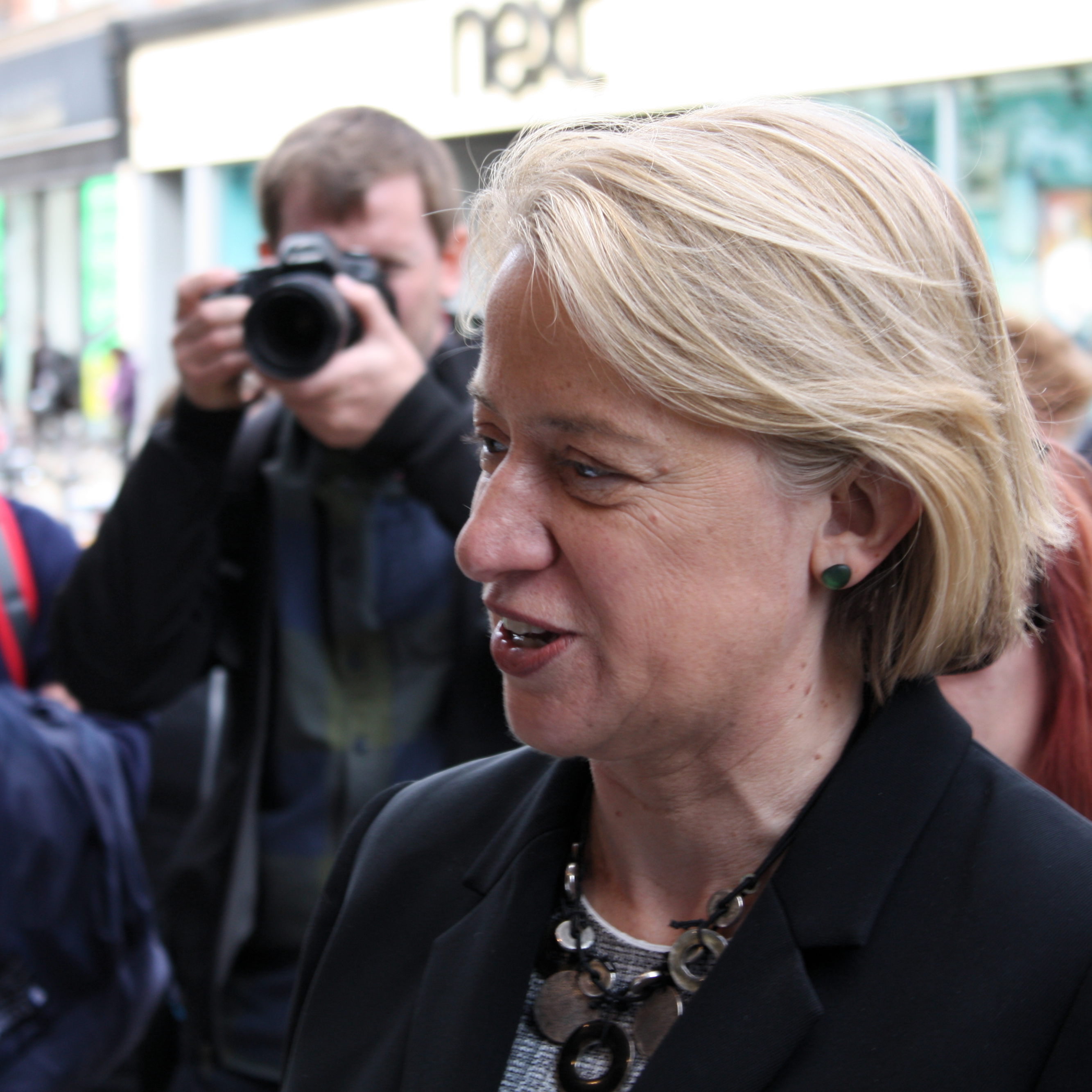
Natalie Bennett, leader of the Green Party of England and Wales, contested Holborn and St Pancras.

Several parties operate in specific regions only. The main national parties, standing in most seats across all of the country, are listed below in order of the number of seats that they contested:

- Conservative Party: The Conservative Party was the senior party in the 2010–15 coalition government, having won the most seats (306) at the 2010 election. The party stood in 647 seats (every seat except for two in Northern Ireland and the Speaker's seat).
- Labour Party: Labour had been in power from 1997 to 2010. The party was Her Majesty's Most Loyal Opposition following the 2010 election, having won 258 seats. It stood in 631 constituencies, (Note: After nominations had closed and ballot papers were printed, the Labour candidate in Banff and Buchan, Sumon Hoque, was suspended from the Labour Party when he was charged with multiple driving offences, and the Labour candidate in Wellingborough, Richard Garvie, was also suspended after a conviction for fraud.) missing only the Speaker's seat, and all seats in Northern Ireland.
- Liberal Democrats: The Liberal Democrats were the junior members of the 2010–15 coalition government, having won 57 seats. They contested 631 seats, and like Labour, only not contesting the Speaker's seat and all seats in Northern Ireland.
- UK Independence Party (or UKIP): UKIP won the fourth most votes at the 2010 election, but failed to win any seats. They went into the election with two seats; due to having won two by-elections. (Note: Former Conservative MP Douglas Carswell crossed to UKIP, then forced a by-election at Clacton. Mark Reckless did likewise at Rochester and Strood.) They also won the most votes of any British party at the 2014 European election. It contested 624 seats across the United Kingdom. (Note: After nominations had closed and ballot papers were printed, two UKIP candidates were suspended from the party for offensive comments.)
- Green Party of England and Wales (or the Green Party): The Green Party went into the election with only one seat. However, they won the fourth-most votes in the 2014 European election. In 2010, Caroline Lucas became the party's first ever MP. In this election they received 3.8% of the vote. This made them the sixth largest party in terms of how many people voted for them. They stood in 573 seats.

==== Minor parties ====
Dozens of minor parties stood in this election. The Trade Unionist and Socialist Coalition stood 135 candidates and was the only minor party to have more than forty candidates. The Respect Party, who came into the election with one MP who was elected at the 2012 Bradford West by-election, stood four candidates. The British National Party, who finished fifth with 1.9% of the vote and stood 338 candidates at the 2010 general election, stood only eight candidates this year following a collapse in their support. Seven hundred fifty-three other candidates stood at the general election, including Independents and candidates from other parties.

=== Northern Ireland ===
The main parties in Northern Ireland in order of their number of seats were:

- Democratic Unionist Party (DUP): the DUP won eight seats in 2010, making it the largest party in Northern Ireland and the fourth biggest in the UK. The party also won the 2011 Northern Ireland Assembly election, and came in second out of the Northern Irish parties at the 2014 European election. It contested 16 of the 18 Northern Irish constituencies, having entered into an electoral pact to abstain from the two other seats with the Ulster Unionist Party.
- Sinn Féin: Sinn Féin won the most votes in Northern Ireland in 2010, but came second in the number of seats, winning five. They came second at the 2011 Northern Ireland Assembly election and they came in first out of the Northern Irish parties in the 2014 European election. In the House of Commons Sinn Féin are abstentionists, and so they have never taken up the seats that they have won there. The party also operates in Ireland, where it does take seats in parliament. It stood in all 18 Northern Irish constituencies.
- Social Democratic and Labour Party (or the SDLP): The SDLP third in terms of both votes and seats in the 2010 general election and 2011 Northern Ireland Assembly election, and fourth in the 2014 European election. Going into this election, the party had three MPs. The SDLP has a relationship with the Labour Party, with the SDLP's MPs generally following the Labour whip. In the case of a hung parliament, the party would have entered into a confidence-and-supply-agreement with the party. They contested all 18 Northern Irish constituencies at the election.
- Ulster Unionist Party (or the UUP): in 2010 the UUP entered an electoral alliance with the Conservative Party, and finished fourth in terms of votes in Northern Ireland, but won no seats. The party has one MEP, having placed third in the 2014 European elections. They came fourth in the 2011 Northern Ireland Assembly election. The UUP contested 15 of the 18 Northern Irish seats; the party did not run in two seats because of its electoral pact with the DUP, and also did not nominate a candidate against former party member, Sylvia Hermon.
- Alliance Party of Northern Ireland: The Alliance Party had one MP going into this election, Naomi Long, who had been elected for the first time in 2010. They came fifth in the 2010 election by vote share. They have a relationship with the Liberal Democrats. However, Long sat on the opposition benches in the Commons and not with the Liberal Democrats on the government benches. The party contested all 18 Northern Irish constituencies in 2015.

Smaller parties in Northern Ireland included the Traditional Unionist Voice, who won no seats at this election but had one member of the Northern Ireland Assembly, the Conservatives and UKIP (both are major parties in the rest of the UK, but are minor parties here).

=== Scotland ===
- Scottish National Party (or the SNP): The SNP only contested seats in Scotland and stood in all 59 Scottish constituencies. The party received the second most votes in Scotland and the sixth most overall in 2010, winning six seats. It won the 2011 election to the Scottish Parliament and had a surge of support since the Scottish independence referendum in September 2014, in which it was the main political party behind the losing Yes campaign. Most projections suggested that it would be the third-largest party overall after the 2015 election, in terms of seats won, overtaking the Liberal Democrats.

Smaller parties in Scotland include the Scottish Libertarian Party, but none of the smaller parties make much of an impact in general elections in Scotland.

=== Wales ===
- Plaid Cymru: Led by Leanne Wood, who was a member of the Welsh Assembly and did not stand in the general election. Plaid Cymru organises only in Wales, where it contested all forty Welsh constituencies. The party has three MPs and was fourth in Wales (eighth overall) by vote share in 2010, later finishing third in the 2011 Welsh Assembly elections.

Wales has a number of smaller parties which, again, do not tend to make much impact in the general elections. In 2015, the Labour Party continued to dominate Welsh politics at the general elections.

=== Pacts and possible coalitions ===
Coalitions have been rare in the United Kingdom, because the system of first-past-the-post voting has usually led to one party winning an overall majority in the Commons. However, with the outgoing Government being a coalition and with opinion polls not showing a large or consistent lead for any one party, there was much discussion about possible post-election coalitions or other arrangements, such as confidence and supply agreements.

Some UK political parties that only stand in part of the country have reciprocal relationships with parties standing in other parts of the country. These include:

- Labour (in Great Britain) and SDLP (in Northern Ireland)
- Liberal Democrats (in Great Britain) and Alliance (in Northern Ireland)
- SNP (in Scotland) and Plaid Cymru (in Wales)
  - Plaid Cymru also recommended supporters in England to vote Green, while the SNP leader Nicola Sturgeon said she would vote for Plaid Cymru were she in Wales, and Green were she in England. However, Sturgeon also said that, if their candidate was the most progressive, she would vote for Labour were she in England.
- Green Party of England and Wales (in England and Wales), Scottish Greens (in Scotland) and the Green Party in Northern Ireland (in Northern Ireland)

On 17 March 2015 the Democratic Unionist Party and the Ulster Unionist Party agreed an election pact, whereby the DUP would not stand candidates in Fermanagh and South Tyrone (where Michelle Gildernew, the Sinn Féin candidate, won by only four votes in 2010) and in Newry and Armagh. In return the UUP would stand aside in Belfast East and Belfast North. The SDLP rejected a similar pact suggested by Sinn Féin to try to ensure that an agreed nationalist would win that constituency. The DUP also called on voters in Scotland to support whichever pro-Union candidate was best placed to beat the SNP.

=== Candidates ===
The deadline for parties and individuals to file candidate nomination papers to the acting returning officer (and the deadline for candidates to withdraw) was 4 p.m. on 9 April 2015. The total number of candidates was 3,971; the second-highest number in history, slightly down from the record 4,150 candidates at the last election in 2010.

There were a record number of female candidates standing in terms of both absolute numbers and percentage of candidates: 1,020 (26.1%) in 2015, up from 854 (21.1%) in 2010. The proportion of female candidates for major parties ranged from 41% of Alliance Party candidates to 12% of UKIP candidates. According to UCL's Parliamentary Candidates UK project the major parties had the following percentages of black and ethnic minority candidates: the Conservatives 11%, the Liberal Democrats 10%, Labour 9%, UKIP 6%, the Greens 4%. The average age of the candidates for the seven major parties was 45.

The youngest candidates were all aged 18: Solomon Curtis (Labour, Wealden); Niamh McCarthy (Independent, Liverpool Wavertree); Michael Burrows (UKIP, Inverclyde); Declan Lloyd (Labour, South East Cornwall); and Laura-Jane Rossington (Communist Party, Plymouth Sutton and Devonport). The oldest candidate was Doris Osen, 84, of the Elderly Persons' Independent Party (EPIC), who contested Ilford North. Other candidates aged over 80 included three long-serving Labour MPs standing for re-election: Sir Gerald Kaufman (aged 84; Manchester Gorton), Dennis Skinner (aged 83; Bolsover) and David Winnick (aged 81; Walsall North). Following his re-election, Kaufman became Father of the House, an honorary title he held until his death in early 2017.

Several candidates, including two each for Labour and UKIP, were suspended from their respective parties after nominations were closed. Independent candidate Ronnie Carroll died after nominations were closed.

== Campaign ==
=== By party ===
==== Conservative ====
In late 2014, six months before the election, the Conservatives decided to target Lib Dem seats as well as defending their own seats and targeting Conservative–Labour marginals, which ultimately contributed to their victory. In 2015 David Cameron launched the Conservative formal campaign in Chippenham on 30 March. Throughout the campaign the Conservatives played on fears of a Labour–SNP coalition following the Scottish independence referendum the year before.

==== Labour ====
The Labour campaign was launched on 27 March at Olympic Park in London. Ed Miliband's EdStone was a major feature of the campaign which was covered by the media. Deputy Leader of the Labour Party Harriet Harman embarked on a pink bus tour as part of her Woman to Woman campaign.

=== Issues ===
==== Constitutional affairs ====
The Conservative manifesto committed to "a straight in-out referendum on our membership of the European Union by the end of 2017". Labour did not support this, but did commit to an EU membership referendum if any further powers were transferred to the European Union. The Lib Dems also supported the Labour position, but explicitly supported the UK's continuing membership of the EU.

The election was the first following the 2014 Scottish independence referendum. None of the three major party manifestos supported a second referendum and the Conservative manifesto stated that "the question of Scotland's place in the United Kingdom is now settled". In the run-up to the election, David Cameron coined the phrase "Carlisle principle" for the idea that checks and balances are required to ensure that devolution to Scotland has no adverse effects on other parts of the United Kingdom. The phrase references a fear that Carlisle, being the English town closest to the Scottish border, could be affected economically by preferential tax rates in Scotland.

==== Government finance ====
The deficit, who was responsible for it and plans to deal with it were a major theme of the campaign. While some smaller parties opposed austerity, the Conservatives, Labour, Liberal Democrats, UKIP and the Greens all supported some further cuts, albeit to different extents.

Conservative campaigning sought to blame the deficit on the previous Labour government. Labour, in return, sought to establish their fiscal responsibility. With the Conservatives also making several spending commitments (e.g., on the NHS), commentators talked of the two main parties' 'political crossdressing', each trying to campaign on the other's traditional territory.

==== Possibility of a hung parliament ====
Hung parliaments have been unusual in British political history since the Second World War, but as the outgoing Government were a coalition and opinion polls were not showing a large or consistent lead for any one party, it was widely expected and predicted throughout the election campaign that no party would gain an overall majority, which could have led to a new coalition or other arrangements such as confidence and supply agreements. This was also associated with a rise in multi-party politics, with increased support for UKIP, the SNP and the Greens.

Avatar of David Cameron

David Cameron
(@David_Cameron)
tweeted:

Britain faces a simple and inescapable choice – stability and strong Government with me, or chaos with Ed Miliband: https://facebook.com/DavidCameronOfficial/posts/979082725449379

4 May 2015

The question of what the different parties would do in the likely event of an inconclusive result dominated much of the campaign. Smaller parties focused on the power this would bring them in negotiations; Labour and the Conservatives both insisted that they were working towards winning overall majorities, while they were also reported to be preparing for the possibility of a second election later in the year. In practice, Labour were prepared to make a 'broad' offer to the Liberal Democrats in the event of a hung parliament.

Most predictions saw Labour as having more potential support in parliament than the Conservatives, with several parties, notably the SNP, having committed to preventing a Conservative government. The Conservatives claimed a hung parliament with Labour as the largest party would result in a 'coalition of chaos', and David Cameron tweeted that the electoral choice was one between 'stable and strong government with me, or chaos with Ed Miliband'. Due to the substantial political turmoil in Britain in the years following the 2015 election, the tweet became infamous.

Conservative campaigning sought to highlight what they described as the dangers of a minority Labour administration supported by the SNP. This proved effective at dominating the agenda of the campaign and at motivating voters to support them. The surprise Conservative victory was 'widely put down to the success of the anti-Labour/SNP warnings', according to the BBC and other media commentators. Labour, in reaction, produced ever stronger denials that they would cooperate with the SNP after the election. The Conservatives and Lib Dems both also rejected the idea of a coalition with the SNP. This was particularly notable for Labour, to whom the SNP had previously offered support: their manifesto stated that "the SNP will never put the Tories into power. Instead, if there is an anti-Tory majority after the election, we will offer to work with other parties to keep the Tories out". SNP leader Nicola Sturgeon later confirmed in the Scottish leaders' debate on STV that she was prepared to 'help make Ed Miliband prime minister'. However, on 26 April, Miliband ruled out a confidence and supply arrangement with the SNP too. Miliband's comments suggested to many that he was aiming to form a minority government.

The Liberal Democrats said that they would talk first to whichever party won the most seats. They later campaigned on being a stabilising influence should either the Conservatives or Labour fall short of a majority, with the slogan 'We will bring a heart to a Conservative Government and a brain to a Labour one.'

Both Labour and the Liberal Democrats ruled out coalitions with UKIP. Ruth Davidson, leader of the Scottish Conservatives, asked about a deal with UKIP in the Scottish leaders' debate, replied: 'No deals with UKIP.' She continued that her preference and the Prime Minister's preference in a hung parliament was for a minority Conservative government. UKIP said they could have supported a minority Conservative government through a confidence and supply arrangement in return for a referendum on EU membership before Christmas 2015. They also spoke of the DUP joining UKIP in this arrangement. UKIP and the DUP said they would work together in Parliament. The DUP welcomed the possibility of a hung parliament and the influence that this would bring them. The party's deputy leader, Nigel Dodds, said they could work with the Conservatives or Labour, but that they were 'not interested in a full-blown coalition government'. Their leader, Peter Robinson, said that the DUP would talk first to whichever party wins the most seats. The DUP said they wanted, for their support, a commitment to 2% defence spending, a referendum on EU membership, and a reversal of the under-occupation penalty. They opposed the SNP being involved in government. The UUP also indicated that they would not work with the SNP if it wanted another independence referendum in Scotland.

The Deputy Prime Minister and leader of the Liberal Democrats, Nick Clegg, warned against a potential 'Blukip' coalition (Conservatives, UKIP and by extension the DUP) with a spoof website highlighting imaginary policies from this prospective coalition, such as reinstating the death penalty, scrapping all benefits for under-25s and charging for hospital visits. Additionally, issues were raised about the continued existence of the BBC – as the DUP, UKIP and Conservatives had made a number of statements criticising the institution – as well as support for same-sex marriage.

Plaid Cymru, the SNP, and the Green Party of England and Wales all ruled out working with the Conservatives, and agreed to work together 'wherever possible' to counter austerity. Each would also make it a condition of any agreement with Labour that Trident nuclear weapons were not replaced; the Green Party of England and Wales stated that 'austerity is a red line'. Both Plaid Cymru and the Green Party stated a preference for a confidence and supply arrangement with Labour, rather than a coalition. The leader of the SDLP, Alasdair McDonnell, said 'we will be the left-of-centre backbone of a Labour administration' and that 'the SDLP will categorically refuse to support David Cameron and the Conservative Party'. Sinn Féin reiterated their abstentionist stance. In the event, the Conservatives did, against expectations, secure a small overall majority, rendering most of the speculation and positioning moot.

== Television debates ==
Cameron speaks at Bloomberg in 2013. His promise to hold a referendum on leaving the EU helped him to win a majority at the 2015 election but eventually led to his resignation little more than a year later.

The first series of televised leaders' debates in the United Kingdom was held in the previous election. Returning major party leaders Cameron and Clegg participated, as did then-prime minister Gordon Brown, who did not seek re-election in his constituency in 2015. Following much debate and various proposals, a seven-way ITV debate with the leaders of Labour, the Conservatives, Liberal Democrats, UKIP, Greens, SNP and Plaid Cymru was held on 2 April. with a series of other debates involving some of the parties.

A five-way BBC debate with the Labour, UKIP, Green, SNP and Plaid Cymru leaders was held on 16 April. The other parties criticised Cameron's absence from the debate. Finally, a Question Time special was broadcast on 30 April, featuring Cameron, Miliband and Clegg. Other party leaders – Sturgeon, Wood and Farage – were given about half an hour to answer questions from an audience in Ask ... programs. Ask Nicola Sturgeon, Ask Leanne Wood and Ask Nigel Farage were broadcast on BBC1 afterwards.

== Endorsements ==
Various newspapers, organisations and individuals endorsed parties or individual candidates for the election. For example, the main national newspapers gave the following endorsements:

=== National daily newspapers ===
Newspaper	Main endorsement	Secondary endorsement(s)	Notes	Link
Daily Express	UK Independence Party	Conservative Party	Endorsed UKIP, and by extension whichever other parties were promising a referendum on the UK's membership of the EU.	
Daily Mail	Conservative Party	UK Independence Party	Endorsed the Conservatives. Encouraged anti-Labour tactical voting.	
Daily Mail	Conservative Party	Liberal Democrats	Endorsed the Conservatives. Encouraged anti-Labour tactical voting.	
Daily Mirror	Labour Party	Liberal Democrats	Endorsed Labour. Supported tactically voting for the Liberal Democrats against the Conservatives in marginal seats.	
Daily Telegraph	Conservative Party	None	Endorsed the Conservatives. Discouraged voting for UKIP on the basis it could split the anti-Labour vote.	
Financial Times	Conservative Party	Liberal Democrats	Endorsed a Conservative-led coalition.	
The Guardian	Labour Party	Green parties	Endorsed Labour. Encouraged anti-Conservative tactical voting, supporting Greens and Liberal Democrats where they were the main opposition to the Conservatives.	
The Guardian	Labour Party	Liberal Democrats	Endorsed Labour. Encouraged anti-Conservative tactical voting, supporting Greens and Liberal Democrats where they were the main opposition to the Conservatives.	
The Independent	Liberal Democrats	Conservative Party	Endorsed a second term of the Conservative–Liberal Democrat coalition.	
Metro	None	None	Did not endorse any party.	—N/a
The Sun	Conservative Party	Liberal Democrats	Endorsed the Conservatives. Encouraged anti-Labour tactical voting, supporting the Liberal Democrats where they were the main opposition to Labour.	
The Times	Conservative Party	Liberal Democrats	Endorsed a second term of the Conservative–Liberal Democrat coalition.	

=== National Sunday newspapers ===
Newspaper	Party endorsed	Link
Independent on Sunday	None	
The Mail on Sunday	Conservative Party	
The Observer	Labour Party	
Sunday Express	UK Independence Party	
Sunday Mirror	Labour Party	
Sunday Telegraph	Conservative Party	
The Sunday Times	Conservative Party	

== Media coverage ==
Despite speculation that 2015 would be the 'social media election', traditional media, particularly broadcast media, remained more influential than new digital platforms. A majority of the public (62%) reported that TV coverage had been most influential for informing them during the election period, especially televised debates between politicians. Newspapers were next most influential, with the Daily Mail influencing people's opinions most (30%), followed by The Guardian (21%) and The Times (20%). Online, major media outlets—like BBC News, newspaper websites, and Sky News—were most influential. Social media was regarded less influential than radio and conversations with friends and family.

During the campaign, TV news coverage was dominated by horse race journalism, focusing on the how close Labour and the Conservatives were according to the polls, and speculation on possible coalition outcomes. There were concerns this 'meta-coverage' was pushing policy issues to the sideline. Policy received less than half of election news airtime across all five main TV broadcasters (BBC, ITV, Channel 4, Channel 5 and Sky) during the first five weeks of the campaign. When policy was addressed, the majority of the news agenda in both broadcast and print media favoured the Conservatives, focusing on the economy, tax, and constitutional matters (e.g. the possibility of a Labour-SNP coalition government), with the economy dominating the news every week of the campaign. On TV, these topics made up 43% of all election news coverage; within the papers, nearly a third (31%) of all election-related articles were on the economy alone. Within reporting and comment about the economy, newspapers prioritised the Conservative Party's angles (i.e., spending cuts (1,351 articles), economic growth (921 articles), reducing the deficit (675 articles)) over Labour's (i.e., Zero-hour contracts (445 articles), mansion tax (339 articles), non-domicile status (322 articles)). Less attention was given to policy areas that might have been problematic for the Conservatives, like the NHS or housing (policy topics favoured by Labour) or immigration (favoured by UKIP).

Reflecting on analysis carried out during the election campaign period, David Deacon of Loughborough University's Communication Research Centre said there was 'aggressive partisanship [in] many section of the national press' which could be seen especially in the 'Tory press'. Similarly, Steve Barnett, Professor of Communications at the University of Westminster, said that, while partisanship has always been part of British newspaper campaigning, in this election it was 'more relentless and more one-sided' in favour of the Conservatives and against Labour and the other parties. According to Bart Cammaerts of the Media and Communications Department at the London School of Economics, during the campaign 'almost all newspapers were extremely pro-Conservative and rabidly anti-Labour'. 57.5% of the daily newspapers backed the Conservatives, 11.7% Labour, 4.9% UKIP, and 1.4% backed a continuation of the incumbent Conservative – Liberal Democrat coalition government; 66% of Sunday national newspapers backed the Conservatives. Of newspaper front-page lead stories, the Conservatives received 80 positive splashes and 26 negative; Labour received 30 positive against 69 negative. Print media was hostile towards Labour at levels 'not seen since the 1992 general election', when Neil Kinnock was 'attacked hard and hit below the belt repeatedly'. Roy Greenslade described the newspaper coverage of Labour as 'relentless ridicule'. Of the leader columns in The Sun, 95% were anti-Labour. The SNP also received substantial negative press in English newspapers: of the 59 leader columns about the SNP during the election, one was positive. The Daily Mail ran a headline suggesting SNP leader Nicola Sturgeon was 'the most dangerous woman in Britain' and, at other times, called her a 'glamorous power-dressing imperatrix' and said that she 'would make Hillary Clinton look human'. While the Scottish edition of The Sun encouraged people north of the border to vote for the SNP, the English edition encouraged people to vote for the Conservatives in order to "stop the SNP running the country". The negative coverage of the SNP increased towards the end of the election campaign. While TV news airtime given to quotations from politicians was more balanced between the two larger parties (Con: 30.14%; Lab: 27.98%), more column space in newspapers was dedicated to quotes from Conservative politicians (44.45%, compared to 29.01% for Labour) – according to analysts, the Conservatives; benefitted from a Tory supporting press in away the other leaders did not'. At times, the Conservatives worked closely with newspapers to co-ordinate their news coverage. For example, The Daily Telegraph printed a letter purportedly sent directly to the paper from 5,000 small business owners; the letter had been organised by the Conservatives and prepared at Conservative Campaign Headquarters.

According to researchers at Cardiff University and Loughborough University, TV news agendas focused on Conservative campaign issues partly because of editorial choices to report on news originally broken in the right-leaning press but not that broken in the left-leaning press. Researchers also found that the most airtime was given to Conservative politicians, especially in Channel 4's and Channel 5's news coverage, where they received more than a third of speaking time. Only ITV gave more airtime to Labour spokespeople (26.9% compared with 25.1% for the Conservatives). Airtime given to the two main political leaders, Cameron (22.4%) and Miliband (20.9%), was more balanced than that given to their parties.

Smaller parties – especially the SNP – received unprecedented levels of media coverage because of speculation about a minority or coalition government. The five most prominent politicians were David Cameron (Con) (15% of TV and press appearances), Ed Miliband (Lab) (14.7%), Nick Clegg (Lib Dem) (6.5%), Nicola Sturgeon (SNP) (5.7%), and Nigel Farage (UKIP) (5.5%). However, according to analysts from Loughborough University Communication Research Centre: 'The big winners of the media coverage were the Conservatives. They gained the most quotation time, the most strident press support, and coverage focused on their favoured issues (the economy and taxation, rather than say the NHS).'

Other than politicians, 'business sources' were the most frequently quoted in the media. On the other hand, trade union representatives, for example, received very little coverage, with business representatives receiving seven times more coverage than unions. Former prime minister Tony Blair was also in the top ten most prominent politicians (equal 9th), warning against the possibility of the UK leaving the EU.

== Opinion polling ==
Conservative Labour Liberal Democrats UKIP Greens

Throughout most of the 2010–15 Parliament, Labour held a consistent polling lead over the Conservatives. Labour overtook the Conservatives at the end of 2010 – benefiting from a collapse in Liberal Democrat support – holding a small lead throughout 2011. Following a brief tightening in early 2012, Labour opened up a wider lead as the Conservatives suffered a slump, partially due to rising UKIP support. UKIP passed the Liberal Democrats – whose ratings were still stagnant – as the third-placed party at the start of 2013. Following this, Labour's lead dipped a little as UKIP also gained support from them.

Labour's lead gradually declined throughout 2014, largely attributed to increases in support for the SNP and the Green Party, as the Conservatives remained relatively level. Liberal Democrat support continued to fall, dipping into single-digits. UKIP won the most seats at the European elections in June 2014, receiving 26.6% of the vote. Though their support in the polls for Westminster never reached this level, it did rise up to over 15% through the year. The Scottish independence referendum was also held in 2014; despite the 'no' vote winning, support for the Scottish National Party rose quickly after the referendum. In Wales, where polls were less frequent, the decline in Labour's lead was smaller, while UKIP and Plaid Cymru made gains.

Early 2015 saw the gap between Labour and the Conservatives continue to tighten, and by the start of the campaign at the end of March, the two parties were in a dead heat. Polling during the campaign itself remained relatively static, with the Labour and Conservative parties both polling between 33 and 34% and neither able to establish a consistent lead. Support for the Green Party and UKIP showed slight drops, while Liberal Democrat support slightly rose up to around 9%. In Scotland, support for the SNP continued to grow with polling figures in late March reaching 54%, with the Labour vote continuing to decline accordingly, while Labour retained their (reduced) lead in Wales. The final polls showed a mixture of small Conservative and Labour leads and ties with both between 31 and 36%, UKIP on 11–16%, the Lib Dems on 8–10%, the Greens on 4–6%, and the SNP on 4–5% of the national vote.

=== Projections one month before the vote ===
The first-past-the-post system used in UK general elections means that the number of seats won is not exactly relative to vote share. Thus, several approaches were used to convert polling data and other information into seat predictions. The table below lists some of the predictions. Some predictions cover Northern Ireland, with its distinct political culture, while others do not. Parties are sorted by current number of seats in the House of Commons.

Parties	ElectionForecast (Newsnight / FiveThirtyEight) as of 9 April 2015	Electoral Calculus as of 12 April 2015	Elections Etc. as of 3 April 2015	The Guardian as of 12 April 2015	May2015.com(New Statesman) as of 12 April 2015	Spreadex as of 15 April 2015	Sporting Index as of 12 April 2015	First Past the Post as of 12 April 2015
Conservatives	284	278	289	281	271	282–287	267	283
Labour Party	274	284	266	271	277	271–276	272	279
SNP	41	48	49	50	54	42–45	42	38
Liberal Democrats	28	17	22	29	26	23–26	25	28
Plaid Cymru	2	3	3	3	3.8	3	3	—N/a
Green Party	1	1	1	1	1	1	1	1
UKIP	1	2	5	4	3	3.5–5.5	6	7
Others	19 (Note: DUP on 8; others (NI) on 7; SDLP on 3; others (GB) on 1.)	18 (Note: Includes Northern Irish seats.)	—N/a	18 (Note: Includes Northern Irish seats.)	19 (Note: Respect on 1; other 18 are Northern Irish seats.)	—N/a	—N/a	19.3 (Note: DUP on 8.7; Sinn Féin on 4.5; SDLP on 2.7; Independent Unionist on 1; Speaker on 1; UUP on 0.9; Respect on 0.5)
Overall result	Hung; Parliament (Con 42 seats short)	Hung; Parliament (Lab 42 seats short)	Hung; Parliament (Con 37 seats short)	Hung; Parliament (Con 45 seats short)	Hung; Parliament (Lab 49 seats short)	Hung; Parliament (Con 39–44 seats short)	Hung; Parliament (Lab 54 seats short)	Hung; Parliament (Con 43 seats short)

=== Final projections before the vote ===
Parties	ElectionForecast (Newsnight / FiveThirtyEight) as of 7 May 2015	Electoral Calculus as of 7 May 2015	Elections Etc. as of 7 May 2015	The Guardian as of 7 May 2015	May2015.com (New Statesman)as of 7 May 2015	Spreadex as of 7 May 2015	Sporting Index as of 7 May 2015	First Past the Post as of 7 May 2015
Conservatives	278	280	285	273	273	288	286	279
Labour Party	267	274	262	273	268	266	269	270
SNP	53	52	53	52	56	48	46	49
Liberal Democrats	27	21	25	27	28	25.5	26.5	25
Plaid Cymru	4	3	3	3	3	4	3	3
Green Party	1	1	1	1	1	2	1	1
UKIP	1	1	3	3	2	3	3	4
Others	19 (Note: DUP on 8; Sinn Féin on 5; SDLP on 3; UUP on 1; Independent Unionist on 1 (Sylvia Hermon); Speaker on 1.)	18 (Note: Includes Northern Irish seats.)	1 (Note: GB forecast only.)	18 (Note: Includes Northern Irish seats.)	19 (Note: Respect on 1; other 18 are Northern Irish seats)	—N/a	—N/a	19.7 (Note: DUP on 8.7; Sinn Féin on 4.7; SDLP on 2.7; Independent Unionist on 1 (Sylvia Hermon); Speaker on 1; UUP on 1; Respect on 0.6.)
Overall result	Hung; Parliament (Con 48 seats short)	Hung; Parliament (Con 46 seats short)	Hung; Parliament (Con 41 seats short)	Hung Parliament (Con & Lab both 53 seats short)	Hung; Parliament (Con 53 seats short)	Hung; Parliament (Con 38 seats short)	Hung; Parliament (Con 40 seats short)	Hung; Parliament (Con 47 seats short)

=== Exit poll ===
An exit poll, collected by Ipsos MORI and GfK on behalf of the BBC, ITN and Sky News, was published at 10 pm at the end of voting. It interviewed around 22,000 people across a sample of 133 constituencies:

Parties	Seats	Change
Conservative Party	316	▲10
Labour Party	239	▼19
Scottish National Party	58	▲52
Liberal Democrats	10	▼47
UK Independence Party	2	▲2
Green Party	2	▲1
Others	23	N/A
Hung Parliament (Conservatives 10 seats short of overall majority)

This predicted the Conservatives to be 10 seats short of an absolute majority, although with the 5 predicted Sinn Féin MPs not taking their seats, it was likely to be enough to govern – although Sinn Féin eventually only won 4 seats.

The exit poll was markedly different from pre-election polls, which had been fairly consistent; this led many pundits and MPs to speculate that the exit poll was inaccurate, and that the final result would have the two main parties closer to each other. Former Liberal Democrat leader Paddy Ashdown vowed to "eat his hat" and former Labour "spin doctor" Alastair Campbell promised to "eat his kilt" if the exit poll was right.

As it turned out, the results were even more favourable to the Conservatives than the poll predicted, with the Conservatives obtaining 330 seats, an absolute majority. Ashdown and Campbell were presented with hat- and kilt-shaped cakes (labelled "eat me") on BBC Question Time on 8 May.

=== Opinion polling inaccuracies and scrutiny ===
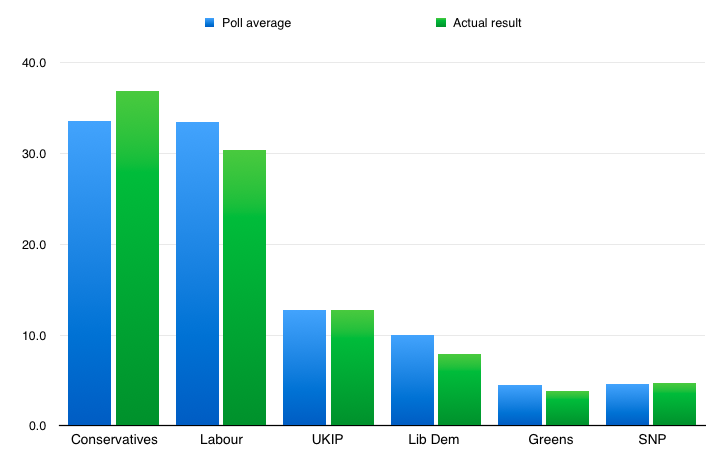
Polling results for the 2015 UK general election, compared to the actual result

With the eventual outcome in terms of both votes and seats varying substantially from the bulk of opinion polls released in the final months before the election, the polling industry received criticism for their inability to predict what was a surprisingly clear Conservative victory. Several theories were put forward to explain the inaccuracy of the pollsters: one was that there had simply been a very late swing to the Conservatives, with Survation claiming that 13% of voters made up their minds in the final days and 17% on the day of the election. Survation also claimed that a poll they carried out a day before the election gave the Conservatives 37% and Labour 31%, though they said they did not release the poll (commissioned by the Daily Mirror) on the concern that it was too much of an outlier with other poll results.

However, it was reported that pollsters had in fact picked up a very late swing to Labour immediately prior to polling day, not the Conservatives. It was reported after the election that private pollsters working for the two largest parties actually gathered more accurate results, with Labour's pollster James Morris claiming that the issue was largely to do with surveying technique. Morris claimed that telephone polls that immediately asked for voting intentions tended to get a high "Don't know" or anti-government reaction, whereas longer telephone conversations conducted by private polls that collected other information such as views on the leaders' performances placed voters in a much better mode to give their true voting intentions. Another theory was that 'shy Tories' did not want to openly declare their intention to vote Conservative to pollsters – this was the case in 1992, the last time pollsters significantly missed. A final theory was the 'Lazy Labour' factor, which claimed that Labour voters tend to not vote on polling day whereas Conservative voters have a much higher turnout.

The British Polling Council announced an inquiry into the substantial variance between the opinion polls and the actual election result. The inquiry published preliminary findings in January 2016, concluding that "the ways in which polling samples are constructed was the primary cause of the polling miss". Their final report was published in March 2016. The British Election Study team suggested that weighting error appeared to be the cause.

== Results ==

Result by countries and English regions

After all 650 constituencies had been declared, the results were:

Party	Leader	MPs			Votes	
Party	Leader		Of total			Of total
Conservative Party	David Cameron	330	50.8%	330 / 650	11,299,609	36.8%
Labour Party	Ed Miliband	232	35.7%	232 / 650	9,347,273	30.4%
Scottish National Party	Nicola Sturgeon	56	8.6%	56 / 650	1,454,436	4.7%
Liberal Democrats	Nick Clegg	8	1.2%	8 / 650	2,415,916	7.9%
Democratic Unionist Party	Peter Robinson	8	1.2%	8 / 650	184,260	0.6%
Sinn Féin	Gerry Adams	4	0.6%	4 / 650	176,232	0.6%
Plaid Cymru	Leanne Wood	3	0.5%	3 / 650	181,704	0.6%
Social Democratic & Labour Party	Alasdair McDonnell	3	0.5%	3 / 650	99,809	0.3%
Ulster Unionist Party	Mike Nesbitt	2	0.3%	2 / 650	114,935	0.4%
UK Independence Party	Nigel Farage	1	0.2%	1 / 650	3,881,099	12.6%
Green Party of England and Wales	Natalie Bennett	1	0.2%	1 / 650	1,111,603	3.8%
Speaker	John Bercow	1	0.2%	1 / 650	34,617	0.1%
Independent Unionist	Sylvia Hermon	1	0.2%	1 / 650	17,689	0.06%

The following table shows final election results as reported by BBC News and The Guardian.

Summary (Note: 66 parties are grouped together as 'other parties'. None of those parties contested more than 2 constituencies, or received more than 300 votes) of the May 2015 House of Commons of the United Kingdom results
Political party	Leader	MPs						Votes		
Political party	Leader	Candidates	Total	Gained	Lost	Net	Of total (%)	Total	Of total (%)	Change (Note: This column shows the change in vote share percentage from the 2010 general election to the 2015 general election. It does not account for by-elections.) (%)
Conservative (Note: BBC News includes the Speaker of the House of Commons, John Bercow, in the MP tally and the vote tally for the Conservatives. See About these results, BBC News (30 April 2015). In this table, however, the speaker (who usually does not vote in the Commons) is listed separately, and has been removed from the Conservative tally.)	David Cameron	647	330	35	11	+24	50.8	11,299,609	36.8	+0.7
Labour	Ed Miliband	631 (Note: Includes 42 Co-operative Party candidates, as part of the Labour-Co-op alliance)	232 (Note: Includes 24 Co-operative Party MPs, as part of the Labour-Co-op alliance)	22 (Note: Includes 3 Co-operative Party MPs, as part of the Labour-Co-op alliance)	48 (Note: Includes 7 Co-operative Party MPs, as part of the Labour-Co-op alliance)	−26 (Note: Includes -4 Co-operative Party MPs, as part of the Labour-Co-op alliance)	35.7 (Note: Includes 3.7% for the Co-operative Party, as part of the Labour-Co-op alliance)	9,347,273 (Note: Includes 873,399 for the Co-operative Party, as part of the Labour-Co-op alliance)	30.4 (Note: Includes 2.8% for the Co-operative Party, as part of the Labour-Co-op alliance)	+1.5 (Note: Includes -0.1% for the Co-operative Party, as part of the Labour-Co-op alliance)
UKIP	Nigel Farage	624	1	1	0	+1	0.2	3,881,099	12.6	+9.5
Liberal Democrats	Nick Clegg	631	8	0	49	−49	1.2	2,415,916	7.9	−15.1
SNP	Nicola Sturgeon	59	56	50	0	+50	8.6	1,454,436	4.7	+3.1
Green Party of England and Wales	Natalie Bennett	538	1	0	0	0	0.2	1,111,603	3.8	+2.7
DUP	Peter Robinson	16	8	1	1	0	1.2	184,260	0.6	0.0
Plaid Cymru	Leanne Wood	40	3	0	0	0	0.5	181,704	0.6	0.0
Sinn Féin	Gerry Adams	18	4	0	1	−1	0.6	176,232	0.6	0.0
UUP	Mike Nesbitt	15	2	2	0	+2	0.3	114,935	0.4	—N/a (Note: The UUP did not run itself in 2010; instead, it ran candidates under the Ulster Conservatives and Unionists banner.)
SDLP	Alasdair McDonnell	18	3	0	0	0	0.5	99,809	0.3	0.0
Independent	—N/a	170	1	0	0	0	0.2	98,711	0.3	—N/a
Alliance	David Ford	18	0	0	1	−1	0	61,556	0.2	+0.1
Scottish Green	Patrick Harvie / Maggie Chapman	32	0	0	0	0	0	39,205	0.1	0.0
TUSC	Dave Nellist	128	0	0	0	0	0	36,490	0.1	+0.1
Speaker	John Bercow	1	1	0	0	0	0.2	34,617	0.1	0.0
NHA (Note: BBC News lists the National Health Action Party together with Independent Community and Health Concern (formerly known as Independent Kidderminster Hospital and Health Concern), which is affiliated with the larger party, for a total of 20,210 votes. The Guardian lists each party separately. Health Concern received 7,211 of the votes attributed to the National Health Action Party.)	Richard Taylor & Clive Peedell	13	0	0	0	0	0	20,210	0.1	0.0
TUV	Jim Allister	7	0	0	0	0	0	16,538	0.1	0.0
Respect	George Galloway	4	0	0	0	0	0	9,989	0.0	−0.1
CISTA	Paul Birch	34	0	0	0	0	0	8,419	0.0	New
People Before Profit	Collective	1	0	0	0	0	0	7,854	0.0	0.0
Green (NI)	Steven Agnew	5	0	0	0	0	0	6,822	0.0	0.0
Yorkshire First	Richard Carter	14	0	0	0	0	0	6,811	0.0	New
English Democrat	Robin Tilbrook	35	0	0	0	0	0	6,531	0.0	−0.2
Mebyon Kernow	Dick Cole	6	0	0	0	0	0	5,675	0.0	0.0
Lincolnshire Independent	Marianne Overton	5	0	0	0	0	0	5,407	0.0	0.0
Liberal	Steve Radford	4	0	0	0	0	0	4,480	0.0	0.0
Monster Raving Loony	Alan "Howling Laud" Hope	27	0	0	0	0	0	3,898	0.0	0.0
Independent Save Withybush Save Lives	Chris Overton	1	0	0	0	0	0	3,729	0.0	New
Socialist Labour	Arthur Scargill	8	0	0	0	0	0	3,481	0.0	0.0
CPA	Sidney Cordle	17	0	0	0	0	0	3,260	0.0	0.0
Christian (Note: The BBC groups together the votes under the Scottish Christian Party (1,467 votes); Christian Party (1,040 votes); and Christian (698 votes) labels, for a total of 3,205 votes. The Guardian lists these designations separately.)	Jeff Green	9	0	0	0	0	0	3,205	0.0	−0.1
No description (Note: Candidates who do not specify a party or Independent are categorised as No description)	—N/a		0	0	0	0	0	3,012	0.0	—N/a
Workers' Party	John Lowry	5	0	0	0	0	0	2,724	0.0	0.0
North East	Hilton Dawson	4	0	0	0	0	0	2,138	0.0	0.0
Poole People	Mike Howell	1	0	0	0	0	0	1,766	0.0	New
BNP	Adam Walker	8	0	0	0	0	0	1,667	0.0	−1.9
Residents for Uttlesford	John Lodge	1	0	0	0	0	0	1,658	0.0	New
Rochdale First Party	Farooq Ahmed	1	0	0	0	0	0	1,535	0.0	New
Communist (Note: The Guardian lists the vote totals for the Communist Party of Britain, Communist Party, Scottish Communist Party Conservatives, and the designation "Communist" separately. In this table, these designations are grouped into a single Communist tally.)	Robert David Griffiths	9	0	0	0	0	0	1,229	0.0	New
Pirate	Laurence Kaye	6	0	0	0	0	0	1,130	0.0	0.0
National Front	Kevin Bryan	7	0	0	0	0	0	1,114	0.0	0.0
Communities United	Kamran Malik	5	0	0	0	0	0	1,102	0.0	New
Reality	Mark "Bez" Berry	3	0	0	0	0	0	1,029	0.0	New
The Southport Party	David Cobham	1	0	0	0	0	0	992	0.0	New
All People's Party	Prem Goyal	4	0	0	0	0	0	981	0.0	New
Peace	John Morris	4	0	0	0	0	0	957	0.0	New
Bournemouth Independent Alliance	David Ross	1	0	0	0	0	0	903	0.0	New
Socialist (GB)	Collective	10	0	0	0	0	0	899	0.0	New
Scottish Socialist	Executive Committee	4	0	0	0	0	0	875	0.0	0.0
Alliance for Green Socialism	Mike Davies	4	0	0	0	0	0	852	0.0	0.0
Your Vote Could Save Our Hospital	Sandra Allison	1	0	0	0	0	0	849	0.0	New
Wigan Independents	Gareth Fairhurst	1	0	0	0	0	0	768	0.0	New
Animal Welfare	Vanessa Hudson	4	0	0	0	0	0	736	0.0	0.0
Something New	James Smith	2	0	0	0	0	0	695	0.0	New
Consensus	Helen Tyrer	1	0	0	0	0	0	637	0.0	New
National Liberal	National Council	2	0	0	0	0	0	627	0.0	New
Independents Against Social Injustice	Steve Walmsley	1	0	0	0	0	0	603	0.0	New
Independence from Europe	Mike Nattrass	5	0	0	0	0	0	578	0.0	New
Whig	Waleed Ghani	4	0	0	0	0	0	561	0.0	New
Guildford Greenbelt Group	Susan Parker	1	0	0	0	0	0	538	0.0	New
Class War	Ian Bone	7	0	0	0	0	0	526	0.0	New
Above and Beyond	Mark Flanagan	5	0	0	0	0	0	522	0.0	New
Northern	Mark Dawson	5	0	0	0	0	0	506	0.0	New
Workers Revolutionary	Sheila Torrance	7	0	0	0	0	0	488	0.0	0.0
Left Unity	Kate Hudson	3	0	0	0	0	0	455	0.0	New
Liberty GB	Paul Weston	3	0	0	0	0	0	418	0.0	New
People First	Collective	1	0	0	0	0	0	407	0.0	New
Other parties (Note: 66 parties, none of which contested more than 2 constituencies, each with under 300 votes)	—N/a		0	0	0	0	0	7,958	0.0	—N/a
Total		3,921	650					30,697,525		

Vote share
Conservative	36.8%
Labour	30.4%
UK Independence	12.6%
Liberal Democrat	7.9%
Scottish National	4.7%
Green	3.8%
Democratic Unionist	0.6%
Sinn Fein	0.6%
Plaid Cymru	0.4%
UUP	0.4%
SDLP	0.3%
Others	2.1%

Parliamentary seats
Conservative	50.8%
Labour	35.7%
Scottish National	8.6%
Liberal Democrat	1.2%
Democratic Unionist	1.2%
Sinn Fein	0.6%
Plaid Cymru	0.5%
SDLP	0.5%
UUP	0.3%
UK Independence	0.2%
Green	0.2%
Independent	0.2%
Speaker	0.2%

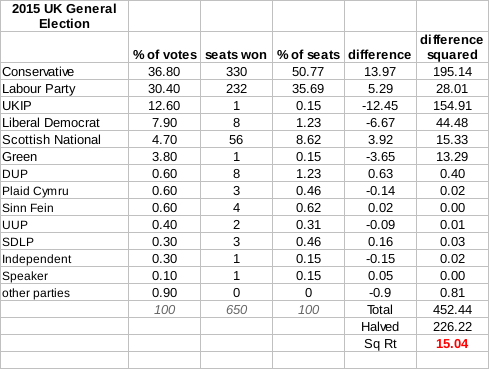
The disproportionality of parliament in the 2015 election was 15.04 according to the Gallagher Index, mainly between the UKIP and Conservative Parties.

=== Geographic voting distribution ===
One result of the 2015 general election was that a different political party won the popular vote in each of the countries of the United Kingdom. This was reflected in terms of MPs elected: The Conservatives won in England with 319 MPs out of 533 constituencies, the SNP won in Scotland with 56 out of 59, Labour won in Wales with 25 out of 40, and the Democratic Unionist Party won in Northern Ireland with 8 out of 18.

=== Outcome ===
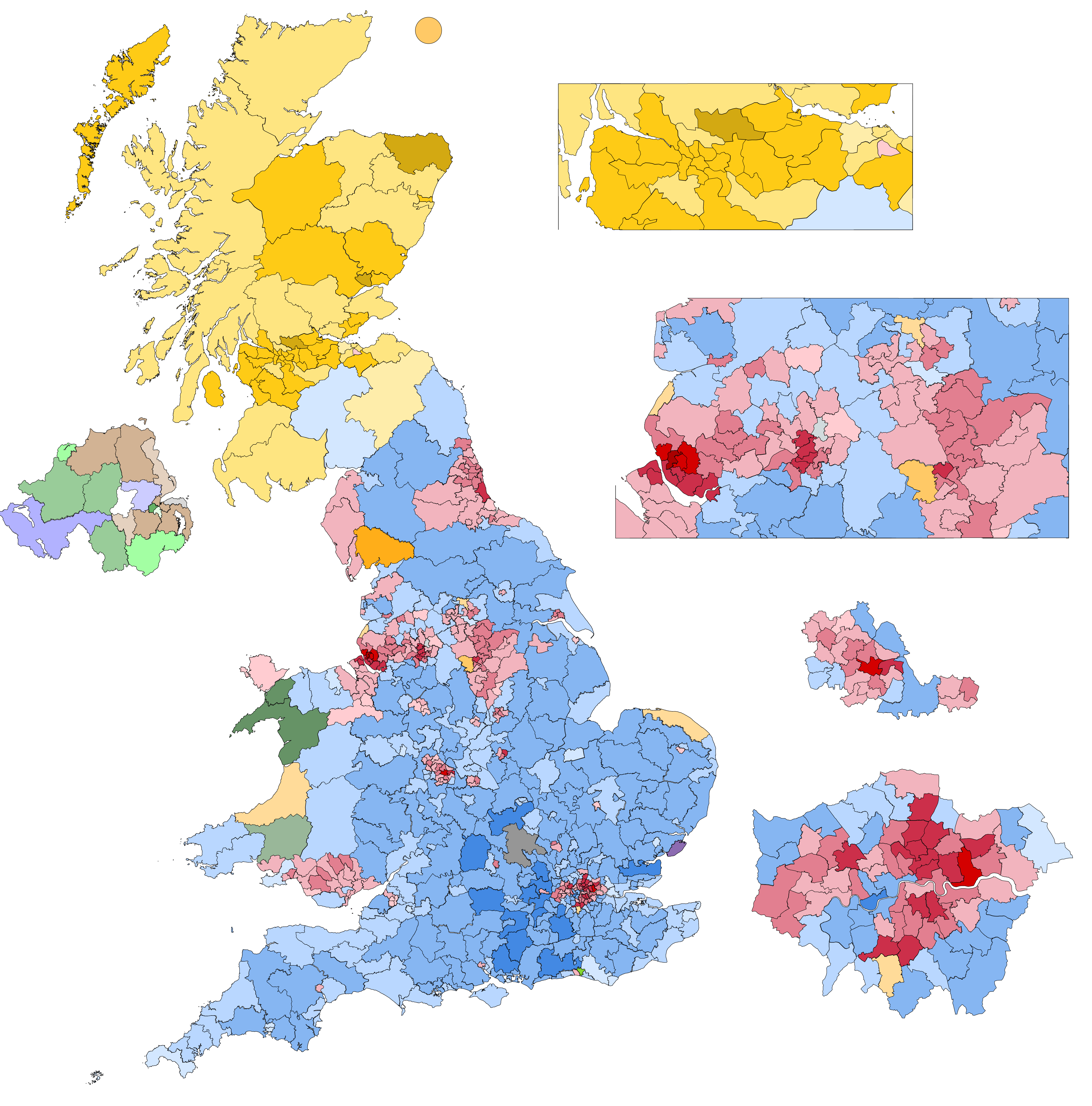
Conservative—70–80% Conservative—60–70% Conservative—50–60% Conservative—40–50% Conservative—<40% / Labour—80–85% Labour—70–80% Labour—60-70% Labour—50–60% Labour—40–50% Labour—<40%

UKIP vote share by constituency

Despite most opinion polls predicting that the Conservatives and Labour were neck and neck, the Conservatives secured a surprise victory after having won a clear lead over their rivals and incumbent Prime Minister David Cameron was able to form a majority single-party government with a working majority of 12 (in practice increased to 15 due to Sinn Féin's four MPs' abstention). Thus the result bore resemblance to 1992. The Conservatives gained 38 seats while losing 10, all to Labour; Employment Minister Esther McVey, in Wirral West, was the most senior Conservative to lose her seat. Cameron became the first Prime Minister since Lord Salisbury in 1900 to increase his popular vote share after a full term, and is sometimes credited as being the only Prime Minister other than Margaret Thatcher (in 1983) to be re-elected with a greater number of seats for his party after a 'full term' (Note: In the 20th century so few Parliaments lasted the full five-year term that some commentators regarded four years as being a 'full term', thus calling the 1979–83 Parliament a 'full term').

A map of the results, showing each constituency as a hexagon of equal size, with the black lines showing separations in regions

The Labour Party polled below expectations, winning 30.4% of the vote and 232 seats, 24 fewer than its previous result in 2010—even though in 222 constituencies there was a Conservative-to-Labour swing, as against 151 constituencies where there was a Labour-to-Conservative swing. Its net loss of seats were mainly a result of its resounding defeat in Scotland, where the Scottish National Party took 40 of Labour's 41 seats, unseating key politicians such as shadow Foreign Secretary Douglas Alexander and Scottish Labour leader Jim Murphy. Labour gained some seats in London and other major cities, but lost a further nine seats to the Conservatives, recording its lowest share of the seats since the 1987 general election. Ed Miliband subsequently tendered his resignation as Labour leader.

The Scottish National Party had a stunning election, rising from just 6 seats to 56 – winning all but 3 of the constituencies in Scotland and securing 50% of the popular vote in Scotland. They recorded a number of record breaking swings of over 30% including the new record of 39.3% in Glasgow North East. They also won the seat of former Prime Minister Gordon Brown, overturning a majority of 23,009 to win by a majority of 9,974 votes and saw Mhairi Black, then a 20-year-old student, defeat Labour's Shadow Foreign Secretary Douglas Alexander with a swing of 26.9%.

The Liberal Democrats, who had been in government as coalition partners, suffered the worst defeat they or the previous Liberal Party had suffered since the 1970 general election. Winning just eight seats, the Liberal Democrats lost their position as the UK's third party and found themselves tied in fourth place with the Democratic Unionist Party of Northern Ireland in the House of Commons, with Nick Clegg being one of the few MPs from his party to retain his seat. The Liberal Democrats gained no seats, while losing 49 in the process—of them, 27 to the Conservatives, 12 to Labour, and 10 to the SNP. The party also lost their deposit in 341 seats, the same number as in every general election from 1979 to 2010 combined. The party lost all of their seats in the South West Region, a typical stronghold. It was the first time since 1966 (as the Liberal Party) that they won 0 seats in the Region.

The UK Independence Party (UKIP) held only one of its two seats, Clacton, gaining no new ones despite increasing its vote share to 12.9% (the third-highest share overall). Party leader Nigel Farage, having failed to win the constituency of South Thanet, tendered his resignation, although this was rejected by his party's executive council and he stayed on as leader.

In Northern Ireland, the Ulster Unionist Party returned to the Commons with two MPs after a five-year absence, gaining one seat from the Democratic Unionist Party and one from Sinn Féin, while the Alliance Party lost its only Commons seat to the DUP, despite an increase in total vote share.

=== Voter demographics ===
==== Ipsos MORI ====
Ipsos MORI polling after the election suggested the following demographic breakdown:

The 2015 UK General Election vote in Great Britain
Social group	Con	Lab	UKIP	Lib Dem	Green	Others	Lead
Total vote	38	31	13	8	4	6	7
Gender
Male	38	30	14	8	4	6	8
Female	37	33	12	8	4	6	4
Age
18–24	27	43	8	5	8	9	16
25–34	33	36	10	7	7	7	3
35–44	35	35	10	10	4	6	0
45–54	36	33	14	8	4	5	3
55–64	37	31	14	9	2	7	6
65+	47	23	17	8	2	3	24
Men by Age
18–24	32	41	7	4	8	8	9
25–34	35	32	11	9	6	7	3
35–54	38	32	12	8	4	6	6
55+	40	25	19	8	2	6	15
Women by Age
18–24	24	44	10	5	9	8	20
25–34	31	40	9	5	8	7	9
35–54	32	35	12	9	4	8	3
55+	45	27	13	9	2	4	18
Social class
AB	45	26	8	12	4	5	19
C1	41	29	11	8	4	7	12
C2	32	32	19	6	4	7	0
DE	27	41	17	5	3	7	14
Men by social class
AB	46	25	10	11	3	5	21
C1	42	27	12	8	4	7	15
C2	30	32	21	5	4	8	2
DE	26	40	18	4	3	9	14
Women by social class
AB	44	28	6	12	5	5	16
C1	41	31	10	8	5	5	10
C2	34	33	17	7	4	5	1
DE	28	42	16	5	3	6	14
Housing tenure
Owned	46	22	15	9	2	6	24
Mortgage	39	31	10	9	3	8	8
Social renter	18	50	18	3	3	8	32
Private renter	28	39	11	6	9	7	11
Ethnic group
White	39	28	14	8	4	7	11
BME	23	65	2	4	3	3	44

==== YouGov ====
YouGov polling after the election suggested the following demographic breakdown:

The 2015 UK general election vote in Great Britain
Social group	Con	Lab	UKIP	Lib Dem	SNP	Green	Plaid	Others	Lead
Total vote	38	31	13	8	5	4	1	2	7
Gender
Male	37	29	15	8	5	4	1	2	8
Female	38	33	12	8	4	4	0	2	5
Age
18–29	32	36	9	9	5	7	1	2	4
30–39	36	34	10	8	5	5	0	2	2
40–49	33	33	14	7	5	4	1	2	0
50–59	36	32	16	7	5	3	1	2	4
60+	45	25	16	7	3	2	0	2	20
Men by Age
18–29	34	31	10	10	5	6	1	2	3
30–39	38	31	11	8	5	5	1	1	7
40–49	34	31	16	7	6	4	1	2	3
50–59	33	31	18	7	6	3	1	2	2
60+	44	24	18	7	4	2	0	1	20
Women by Age
18–29	29	41	7	8	4	8	1	2	12
30–39	33	37	9	8	5	5	0	2	4
40–49	33	36	12	7	5	4	1	2	3
50–59	38	32	14	7	4	3	0	2	6
60+	46	25	14	8	3	2	0	2	21
Social class
AB	44	28	9	10	4	4	1	2	16
C1	38	30	11	9	5	5	1	2	8
C2	36	31	17	6	5	3	1	2	5
DE	29	37	18	6	5	3	0	2	8
Highest educational level
GCSE or lower	38	30	20	5	3	2	0	2	8
A-Level	37	31	11	8	6	5	1	2	6
University	35	34	6	11	5	6	1	2	1
Other	41	27	13	8	5	3	0	2	14
DK/refused	32	33	18	4	6	3	0	4	1
Housing status
Own outright	47	23	15	8	3	2	0	1	24
Mortgage	42	29	12	8	4	3	0	2	13
Social housing	20	45	18	5	7	3	0	1	25
Private rented	34	32	12	9	4	7	0	1	2
Don't know	31	38	10	8	4	6	0	3	7
Work sector
Private sector	43	26	14	7	4	4	0	2	17
Public sector	33	36	11	9	5	4	1	2	3
Household income
Under £20,000	29	36	17	7	5	4	1	2	7
£20,000-£39,999	37	32	14	8	4	4	0	1	5
£40,000-£69,999	42	29	10	9	5	4	1	1	13
£70,000+	51	23	7	10	4	3	0	1	28
Newspaper
Daily Express	51	13	27	5	2	1	0	1	38
Daily Mail	59	14	19	5	1	1	0	2	45
Daily Mirror/Daily Record	11	67	9	5	6	2	0	1	56
Daily Star	25	41	26	3	3	1	0	2	16
The Sun	47	24	19	4	4	1	0	1	23
The Daily Telegraph	69	8	12	8	0	1	0	1	61
The Guardian	6	62	1	11	3	14	1	2	56
The Independent	17	47	4	16	3	11	1	1	30
The Times	55	20	6	13	1	3	1	2	35

=== Gender ===
The election led to an increase in the number of female MPs, to 191 (29% of the total, including 99 Labour; 68 Conservative; 20 SNP; 4 other) from 147 (23% of the total, including 87 Labour; 47 Conservative; 7 Liberal Democrat; 1 SNP; 5 other). As before the election, the region with the largest proportion of women MPs was North East England.

Votes, of total, by party
1. Conservative (36.8%)
2. Labour (30.4%)
3. UKIP (12.6%)
4. Liberal Democrats (7.90%)
5. SNP (4.70%)
6. Green (3.80%)
7. DUP (0.60%)
8. Plaid Cymru (0.60%)
9. Sinn Féin (0.60%)
10. UUP (0.40%)
11. SDLP (0.30%)
12. Other (1.30%)
MPs, of total, by party
1. Conservative (50.8%)
2. Labour (35.7%)
3. SNP (8.60%)
4. Liberal Democrats (1.20%)
5. DUP (1.20%)
6. Sinn Féin (0.60%)
7. Plaid Cymru (0.50%)
8. Social Democratic & Labour Party (0.50%)
9. UUP (0.30%)
10. Green (0.20%)
11. Speaker (0.20%)
12. Independent Unionist (0.20%)
13. UKIP (0.20%)

== Open seats changing hands ==
Party	Candidate	Incumbent	Constituency	Defeated by	Party
Labour	Richard Baker	Frank Doran	Aberdeen North	Kirsty Blackman	SNP
Liberal Democrats	Steve Bradley	Don Foster	Bath	Ben Howlett	Conservative
Liberal Democrats	Julie Pörksen	Alan Beith	Berwick-upon-Tweed	Anne-Marie Trevelyan	Conservative
Liberal Democrats	Lauren Keith	Sarah Teather	Brent Central	Dawn Butler	Labour
Labour	Michael Marra	Jim McGovern	Dundee West	Chris Law	SNP
Labour	Ricky Henderson	Alistair Darling	Edinburgh South West	Joanna Cherry	SNP
Independent	Karen Whitefield (Lab)	Eric Joyce (elected as Labour) (Note: Joyce was a member of the Labour Party until his resignation from the party in 2012 in the aftermath of an assault.)	Falkirk	John McNally	SNP
Labour	Melanie Ward	Lindsay Roy	Glenrothes	Peter Grant	SNP
Liberal Democrats	Christine Jardine	Malcolm Bruce	Gordon	Alex Salmond	SNP
Labour	Liz Evans	Martin Caton	Gower	Byron Davies	Conservative
Liberal Democrats	Lisa Smart	Andrew Stunell	Hazel Grove	William Wragg	Conservative
Conservative	Graham Cox	Mike Weatherley	Hove	Peter Kyle	Labour
Labour	Kenny Selbie	Gordon Brown	Kirkcaldy and Cowdenbeath	Roger Mullin	SNP
Liberal Democrats	Vikki Slade	Annette Brooke	Mid Dorset and North Poole	Michael Tomlinson	Conservative
Labour	Kenny Young	David Hamilton	Midlothian	Owen Thompson	SNP
Liberal Democrats	Tim Brett	Menzies Campbell	North East Fife	Stephen Gethins	SNP
Liberal Democrats	Josh Mason	Ian Swales	Redcar	Anna Turley	Labour Co-operative
Liberal Democrats	David Rendel	David Heath	Somerton and Frome	David Warburton	Conservative
Labour	Rowenna Davis	John Denham	Southampton Itchen	Royston Smith	Conservative
Labour	Johanna Boyd	Anne McGuire	Stirling	Steven Paterson	SNP
Liberal Democrats	Rachel Gilmour	Jeremy Browne	Taunton Deane	Rebecca Pow	Conservative

=== Seats which changed allegiance ===
111 seats changed hands compared to the result in 2010 plus three by-election gains reverted to the party that won the seat at the last general election in 2010 (Bradford West, Corby and Rochester and Strood).

Labour to SNP (40)

- Aberdeen North
- Aberdeen South
- Airdrie and Shotts
- Ayr, Carrick and Cumnock
- Central Ayrshire
- Coatbridge, Chryston and Bellshill
- Cumbernauld, Kilsyth and Kirkintilloch East
- Dumfries and Galloway
- Dundee West
- Dunfermline and West Fife
- East Kilbride, Strathaven and Lesmahagow
- East Lothian
- East Renfrewshire
- Edinburgh East
- Edinburgh North and Leith
- Edinburgh South West
- Falkirk
- Glasgow Central
- Glasgow East
- Glasgow North
- Glasgow North East
- Glasgow North West
- Glasgow South
- Glasgow South West
- Glenrothes
- Inverclyde
- Kilmarnock and Loudoun
- Kirkcaldy and Cowdenbeath
- Lanark and Hamilton East
- Linlithgow and East Falkirk
- Livingston
- Midlothian
- Motherwell and Wishaw
- North Ayrshire and Arran
- Ochil and South Perthshire
- Paisley and Renfrewshire North
- Paisley and Renfrewshire South
- Rutherglen and Hamilton West
- Stirling
- West Dunbartonshire

Liberal Democrat to Conservative (27)

- Bath
- Berwick-upon-Tweed
- Brecon and Radnorshire
- Cheadle
- Cheltenham
- Chippenham
- Colchester
- Eastbourne
- Eastleigh
- Hazel Grove
- Kingston and Surbiton
- Lewes
- Mid Dorset and North Poole
- North Cornwall
- North Devon
- Portsmouth South
- Solihull
- Somerton and Frome
- St Austell and Newquay
- St Ives
- Sutton and Cheam
- Taunton Deane
- Thornbury and Yate
- Torbay
- Twickenham
- Wells
- Yeovil

Liberal Democrat to Labour (12)

- Bermondsey and Old Southwark
- Birmingham Yardley
- Bradford East
- Brent Central
- Bristol West
- Burnley
- Cambridge
- Cardiff Central
- Hornsey and Wood Green
- Manchester Withington
- Norwich South
- Redcar

Liberal Democrat to SNP (10)

- Argyll and Bute
- Berwickshire, Roxburgh and Selkirk
- Caithness, Sutherland and Easter Ross
- East Dunbartonshire
- Edinburgh West
- Gordon
- Inverness, Nairn, Badenoch and Strathspey
- North East Fife
- Ross, Skye and Lochaber
- West Aberdeenshire and Kincardine

Conservative to Labour (10)

- Brentford and Isleworth
- City of Chester
- Dewsbury
- Ealing Central & Acton
- Enfield North
- Hove
- Ilford North
- Lancaster and Fleetwood
- Wirral West
- Wolverhampton South West

Labour to Conservative (8)

- Bolton West
- Derby North
- Gower
- Morley and Outwood
- Plymouth Moor View
- Southampton Itchen
- Telford
- Vale of Clwyd

Conservative to UKIP (1)

- Clacton

DUP to UUP (1)

- South Antrim

Sinn Féin to UUP (1)

- Fermanagh and South Tyrone

Alliance to DUP (1)

- Belfast East

=== General election records broken in 2015 ===
==== Youngest elected MP ====
- Mhairi Black, Scottish National Party, elected aged 20 years 237 days.

==== Largest swing ====
- A swing of 39.3% from Labour to the SNP was recorded in Glasgow North East.

==== Lowest winning vote share ====
- Alasdair McDonnell of the SDLP won the seat of Belfast South on 24.5% of the vote.

== Aftermath ==
=== Foreign reactions ===
President Barack Obama of the United States congratulated Cameron and his Conservative Party on his "impressive electoral victory" and that he "looked forward to continuing to strengthen the bonds between our countries as we work together on behalf of global peace, security and prosperity."

=== Resignations ===
On 8 May, three party leaders announced their resignations within an hour of each other: Ed Miliband (Labour) and Nick Clegg (Liberal Democrat) resigned due to their parties' worse-than-expected results in the election, although both had been re-elected to their seats in Parliament. Nigel Farage (UKIP) offered his resignation because he had failed to be elected as MP for South Thanet, but said he might re-stand in the resulting leadership election. However, on 11 May, the UKIP executive rejected his resignation on the grounds that the election campaign had been "a great success", and Farage agreed to continue as party leader.

Alan Sugar, a Labour peer in the House of Lords, also announced his resignation from the Labour Party for running what he perceived to be an anti-business campaign.

In response to Labour's poor performance in Scotland, Scottish Labour leader Jim Murphy initially resisted calls for his resignation by other senior party members. Despite surviving a no-confidence vote by 17–14 from the party's national executive, Murphy announced he would step down as leader on or before 16 May.

=== Financial markets ===
Financial markets reacted positively to the result, with the pound sterling rising against the Euro and US dollar when the exit poll was published, and the FTSE 100 stock market index rising 2.3% on 8 May. The BBC reported: "Bank shares saw some of the biggest gains, on hopes that the sector will not see any further rises in levies. Shares in Lloyds Banking Group rose 5.75% while Barclays was 3.7% higher", adding: "Energy firms also saw their share prices rise, as Labour had wanted a price freeze and more powers for the energy regulator. British Gas owner Centrica rose 8.1% and SSE shares were up 5.3%." BBC economics editor Robert Peston noted: "To state the obvious, investors love the Tories' general election victory. There are a few reasons. One (no surprise here) is that Labour's threat of breaking up banks and imposing energy price caps has been lifted. Second is that investors have been discounting days and weeks of wrangling after polling day over who would form the government – and so they are semi-euphoric that we already know who's in charge. Third, many investors tend to be economically Conservative and instinctively Conservative."

=== Electoral reform ===
The disparity between the numbers of votes and the number of seats obtained by the smaller parties gave rise to increased calls for replacement of the 'first-past-the-post' voting system with a more proportional system. For example, UKIP had 3.9 million votes per seat, whereas SNP had just 26,000 votes per seat, about 150 times greater representation for each vote cast. UKIP stood in 10 times as many seats as the SNP. Noting that UKIP's 13% share of the overall votes cast had resulted in the election of just one MP, Nigel Farage argued that the UK's voting system needed reforming, saying: "Personally, I think the first-past-the-post system is bankrupt."

Re-elected Green Party MP Caroline Lucas agreed, saying: "The political system in this country is broken [...] It's ever clearer tonight that the time for electoral reform is long overdue, and it's only proportional representation that will deliver a Parliament that is truly legitimate and better reflects the people it is meant to represent."

=== Daily Telegraph investigation of abuse of Wikipedia ===
Following the election, The Daily Telegraph detailed changes to Wikipedia pages made from computers with IP addresses inside Parliament raising suspicion that "MPs or their political parties deliberately hid information from the public online to make candidates appear more electable to voters" and a deliberate attempt to hide embarrassing information from the electorate.

=== Telegraph Media Group fined ===
On 21 December 2015, the UK Information Commissioner's Office fined the Telegraph Media Group £30,000 for sending 'hundreds of thousands of emails on the day of the general election urging readers to vote Conservative ... in a letter from Daily Telegraph editor Chris Evans, attached to the paper's usual morning e-bulletin'. The ICO concluded that subscribers had not expressed their consent to receive this kind of direct marketing.

=== Election petition ===
Four electors from Orkney and Shetland lodged an election petition on 29 May 2015 attempting to unseat Alistair Carmichael and force a by-election over what became known as 'Frenchgate'. The issue centred around the leaking of a memo from the Scotland Office about comments allegedly made by the French ambassador Sylvie Bermann about Nicola Sturgeon, claiming that Sturgeon had privately stated she would "rather see David Cameron remain as PM", in contrast to her publicly stated opposition to a Conservative government. The veracity of the memo was quickly denied by the French ambassador, French consul general and Sturgeon. At the time of the leak, Carmichael denied all knowledge of the leaking of the memo in a television interview with Channel 4 News. but after the election Carmichael accepted the contents of the memo were incorrect, admitted that he had lied, and that he had authorised the leaking of the inaccurate memo to the media after a Cabinet Office enquiry identified Carmichael's role in the leak. On 9 December, an Election Court decided that although he had told a "blatant lie" in a TV interview, it had not been proven beyond reasonable doubt that he had committed an "illegal practice" under the Representation of the People Act and he was allowed to retain his seat.

=== Party election spending investigations ===
At national party level, the Electoral Commission fined the three largest parties for breaches of spending regulations, levying the highest fines since its foundation: £20,000 for Labour in October 2016, £20,000 for the Liberal Democrats in December 2016, and £70,000 for the Conservative Party in March 2017.

The higher fine for the Conservatives reflected both the extent of the wrongdoing (which extended to the 2014 parliamentary by-elections in Clacton, Newark and Rochester and Strood) and 'the unreasonable uncooperative conduct by the Party'. The commission also found that the Party Treasurer, Simon Day, may not have fulfilled his obligations under the Political Parties, Elections and Referendums Act 2000 and referred him for investigation to the Metropolitan Police Service.

At constituency level, related alleged breaches of spending regulations led to 'unprecedented' police investigations for possible criminal conduct of between 20 and 30 Conservative Party MPs. On 9 May 2017, the Crown Prosecution Service decided not to prosecute the vast majority of suspects, saying that "in order to bring a charge, it must be proved that a suspect knew the return was inaccurate and acted dishonestly in signing the declaration. Although there is evidence to suggest the returns may have been inaccurate, there is insufficient evidence to prove to the criminal standard that any candidate or agent was dishonest." On 2 June 2017, charges were brought under the Representation of the People Act 1983 against Craig Mackinlay, who was elected Conservative MP for South Thanet in 2015, his agent Nathan Gray, and a party activist, Marion Little. Appearing at Westminster Magistrates' Court on 4 July 2017, the three pleased not guilty and were released on unconditional bail pending an appearance at Southwark Crown Court on 1 August 2017. The investigation of Party Treasurer Simon Day remained ongoing.

In 2016–18, the European Parliament found that UKIP had unlawfully spent over €173,000 of EU funding on the party's 2015 UK election campaign, via the Alliance for Direct Democracy in Europe and the affiliated Institute for Direct Democracy. The Parliament required the repayment of the mis-spent funds and denied the organisations some other funding. It also found that UKIP MEPs had unlawfully spent EU money on other assistance for national campaigning purposes during 2014–16 and docked their salaries to recoup the mis-spent funds.

== See also ==
- 2015 United Kingdom general election in England
- 2015 United Kingdom general election in Northern Ireland
- 2015 United Kingdom general election in Scotland
- 2015 United Kingdom general election in Wales
- List of MPs elected in the 2015 United Kingdom general election
- List of MPs for constituencies in England (2015–2017)
- List of MPs for constituencies in Northern Ireland (2015–2017)
- List of MPs for constituencies in Scotland (2015–2017)
- List of MPs for constituencies in Wales (2015–2017)
- 2015 United Kingdom local elections
- Results of the 2015 United Kingdom general election
- Results breakdown of the 2015 United Kingdom general election
- 2010s in United Kingdom political history
