= Sporting Index =

British betting company

Sporting Index Ltd
- Type: Private Limited Company
- Industry: Financial services
- Founded: 1992
- Headquarters: London, UK
- Key people: Andy Wright (CEO); Craig Artley (Finance Director); Derren Maggs (Managing Director of Sporting Index)
- Number of employees: 300
- Website: www.sportingindex.com

Sporting Index is a British-based company specialising in sports spread betting. It claims an estimated UK market share of over 70%. The company is best known for spread betting; offering a wide variety of sports, politics and showbiz events, as well as a portfolio of unique virtual games. The betting firm also provides a Fixed Odds service. Business-to-business trading and risk management services are also offered to international betting and gaming operators under the Sporting Solutions brand.

== History ==
Sporting Index was founded in April 1992 with 5 members of staff and a handful of clients. Their first bet was taken on a buy of Tory seats in the 1992 election. This was the first time Sports bettors were about to 'cash out' by opening and closing positions.

In July 2001 Sporting Index launched the first fully interactive internet-based sports spread betting website. Since 2004 Sporting Index has also hosted casino and sports related virtual games based on the concept of spread betting.

In 2002 UK private equity firm Duke Street Capital backed a management buyout of Sporting Index, led by then CEO Richard Glynn, for £52.7 million. A secondary buyout saw HgCapital acquire the company from Duke Street Capital for a total cash consideration of £75.8 million in October 2005.

Sold in 2015 for an undisclosed sum to Swedish businessman Magnus Hedman.

In March 2016, Simon Trim was appointed as the new Sporting Index CEO following the departure of Warren Murphy.

In June 2019, Sporting Index was acquired by French lottery company FDJ (Française des Jeux).

In August 2019, Sporting Index launched their new fixed odds product for their UK customers.

In November 2023, Sporting Index was acquired by Spreadex Ltd.

== Operations ==
With offices based in London and Wigan, the company offers spread bets on a wide variety of sports, political and showbiz events, as well as virtual games and an online casino.

Clients transact 24/7 via its mobile phone applications, website and a voice telephony service.

Sporting Index is the B2C division of the Sporting Group, in sports betting technology and trading. The Group employs almost 300 staff and has two principal divisions.

The Sporting Group's B2B division, Sporting Solutions, supplies sports betting software and data services to bookmakers including Sky Betting and Gaming, Danske Spil, TABCorp and Singapore Pools.

== Regulation ==
Sporting Index is authorised and regulated by the UK's Financial Conduct Authority (FCA) and the UK Gambling Commission.
