= 2024 United Kingdom general election =

- 4 July 2024

All 650 seats in the House of Commons 326 (Note: Given that Sinn Féin members of Parliament (MPs) practise abstentionism and do not take their seats, while the Speaker and deputies do not vote, the number of MPs needed for a majority is in practice slightly lower. Sinn Féin won seven seats, and considering the speaker and their three deputy speakers, a practical majority requires 320 seats.) seats needed for a majority
- Opinion polls
- Registered: 48,224,212
- Turnout: 28,809,340; 59.7% (▼7.8 pp)
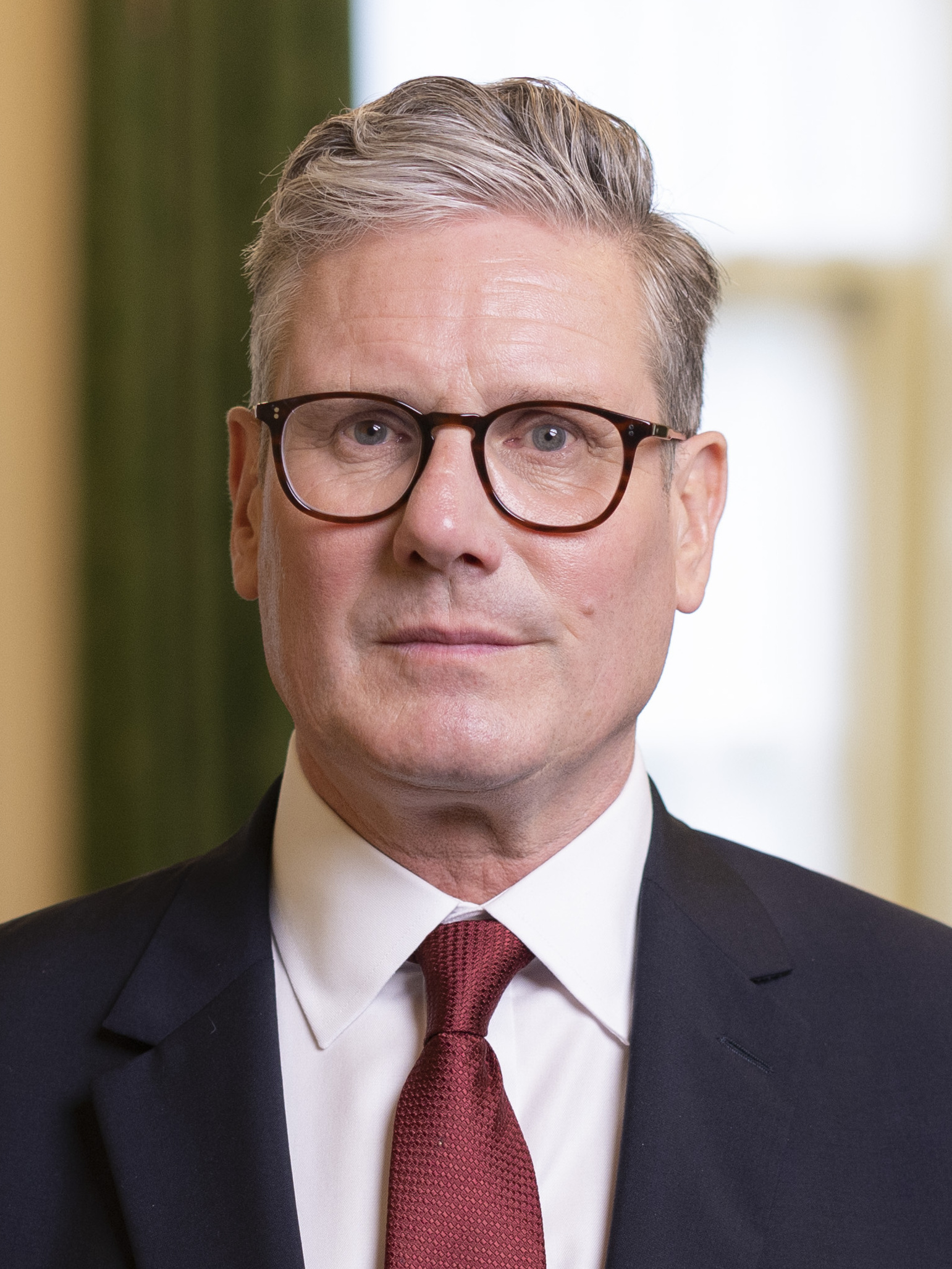

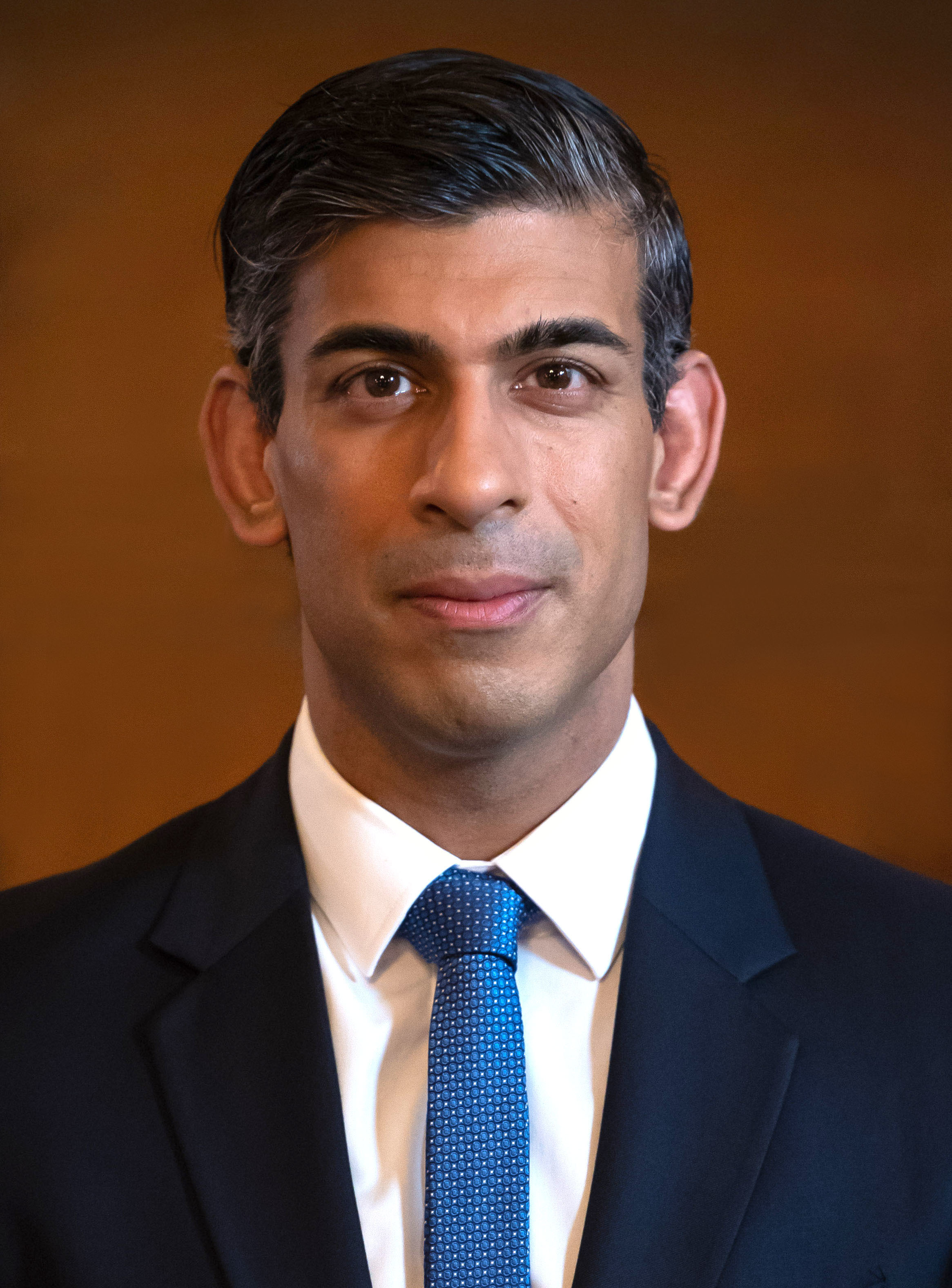

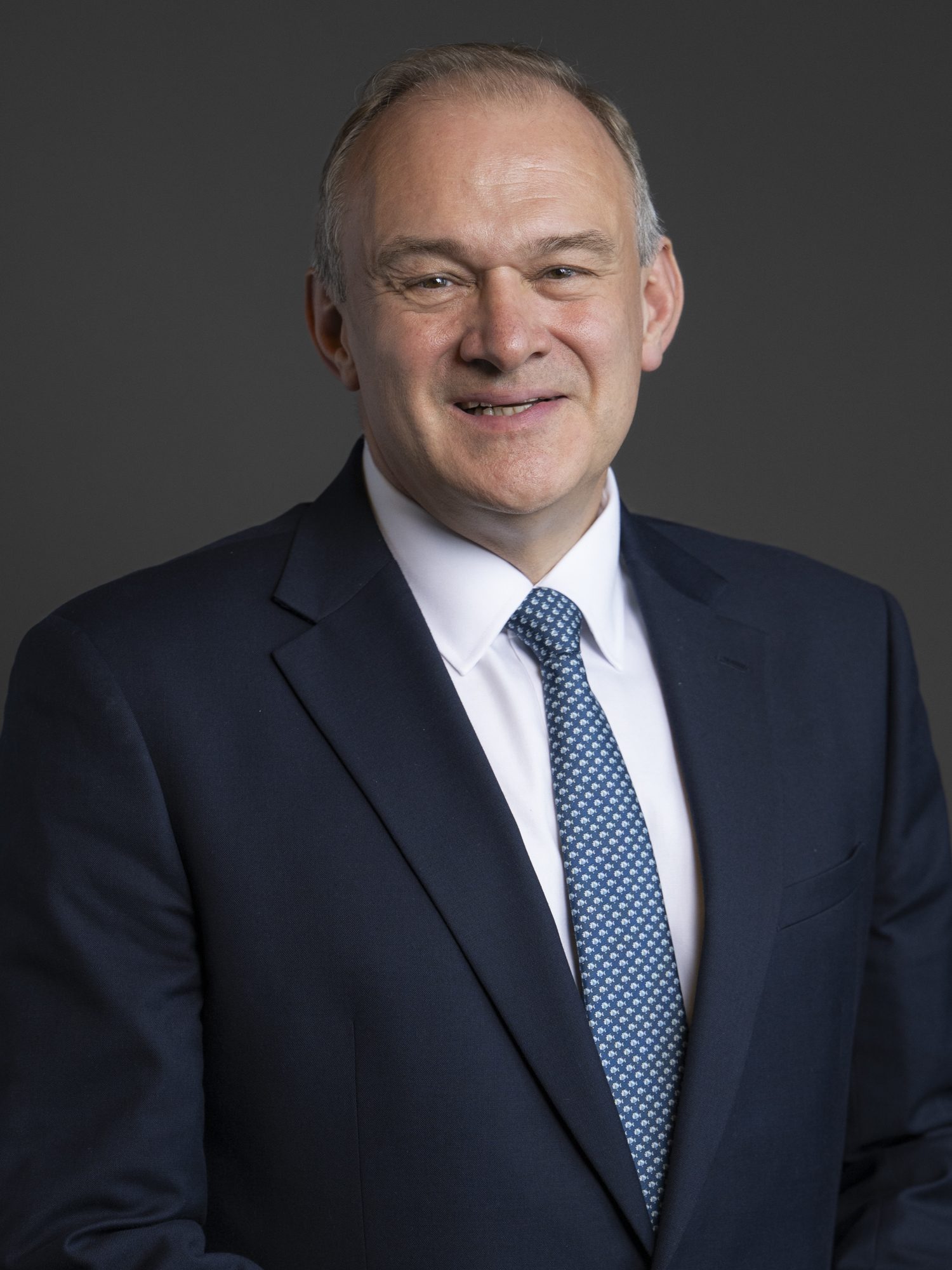
	First party	Second party	Third party
Leader	Keir Starmer	Rishi Sunak	Ed Davey
Party	Labour	Conservative	Liberal Democrats
Leader since	4 April 2020	24 October 2022	27 August 2020
Leader's seat	Holborn and St Pancras	Richmond and Northallerton (Note: Represented Richmond (Yorks) prior to dissolution. Richmond and Northallerton was the direct successor seat under new constituency boundaries.)	Kingston and Surbiton
Last election	202 seats, 32.1%	365 seats, 43.6%	11 seats, 11.6%
Seats before	205	344	15
Seats won	411 (Note: The figure does not include Lindsay Hoyle, the speaker of the House of Commons, who was included in the Labour seat total by some media outlets. By long-standing convention, the Speaker severs all ties to their affiliated party upon being elected speaker.)	121	72
Seat change	▲211 (Note: Seat change compared to notional 2019 result under new constituency boundaries. This means Labour won 200 notional seats in 2019.)	▼251 (Note: Seat change compared to notional 2019 result under new constituency boundaries. This means the Conservatives won 372 notional seats in 2019.)	▲64 (Note: Seat change compared to notional 2019 result under new constituency boundaries. This means the Liberal Democrats won 8 notional seats in 2019.)
Popular vote	9,708,716	6,828,925	3,519,143
Percentage	33.7%	23.7%	12.2%
Swing	▲1.6 pp	▼19.9 pp	▲0.6 pp
- A map presenting the results of the election, by party of the MP elected from each constituency

- Composition of the House of Commons after the election
Prime Minister before election
Rishi Sunak
Conservative
Prime Minister after election
Keir Starmer
Labour

A general election was held in the United Kingdom on 4 July 2024 to elect all 650 members of the House of Commons. The opposition Labour Party, led by Keir Starmer, won a landslide victory over the governing Conservative Party under Prime Minister Rishi Sunak, ending 14 years of Conservative-led government.

Labour secured 411 seats (Note: Including 43 Labour Co-op MPs) and a 172-seat majority, the third-best showing in the party's history and its best since 2001. The party's vote share was 33.7%, the lowest for a governing party on record. They became the largest party in England, Scotland and Wales. The Conservatives suffered their worst-ever defeat, winning 121 seats with 23.7% of the vote and losing 251 seats, including those of the former prime minister Liz Truss and 12 cabinet ministers. A total of 335 new MPs entered the House of Commons.

Smaller parties saw record support, with 42.6% of the total vote. The Liberal Democrats, led by Ed Davey, became the third-largest party with 72 seats, their best result ever and better than any Liberal Party result since 1923. Reform UK, led by Nigel Farage, won five seats and 14.3% of the vote, the third-highest vote share, and the Green Party won four seats. For both parties this was their best parliamentary result to date.

In Scotland, the Scottish National Party (SNP) dropped from 48 to nine seats, losing its status as Scotland's largest party. In Wales, Plaid Cymru won four seats. In Northern Ireland, which has a distinct set of political parties, Sinn Féin retained seven seats, while the Democratic Unionist Party dropped from eight to five seats, making this the first election in which an Irish nationalist party won the most seats in Northern Ireland.

Campaign issues included the economy, healthcare, housing, energy and immigration. There was relatively little discussion of Brexit, which was a major issue during the 2019 general election. This was the first general election under the Dissolution and Calling of Parliament Act 2022, the first with photo identification required to vote in Great Britain, (Note: In Northern Ireland, voter ID was already required at elections before it was introduced in the rest of the UK.) and the first contested using the new constituency boundaries implemented following the 2023 review of Westminster constituencies.

== Background ==
=== Political background of the Conservatives before the election ===
The Conservative Party under Boris Johnson won a large majority at the 2019 general election and the new government passed the Brexit withdrawal agreement. The COVID-19 pandemic saw the government institute extensive public health restrictions, including limitations on social interaction, that Johnson and some of his staff were later found to have broken. The resulting political scandal (Partygate), one of many controversies during Johnson's premiership, saw the Conservatives lose their poll lead. These scandals culminated in the resignation of over 50 ministers from the Government following allegations of sexual misconduct against a government minister. Johnson announced his resignation in July 2022, to become effective from the election of a successor. He resigned as MP the following year, after an investigation unanimously found that he had lied to Parliament.

Liz Truss won the resultant leadership election and succeeded Johnson. Truss announced large-scale tax cuts and borrowing in a mini-budget on 23 September, although many of its measures were reversed following financial instability. She resigned in October, making her the shortest-serving prime minister in British history, and was succeeded unopposed by Rishi Sunak.

During his premiership, Sunak was credited with improving the economy and stabilising national politics following the premierships of his predecessors, although many of his pledges and policy announcements ultimately went unfulfilled. He did not avert further unpopularity for the Conservatives who, by the time of Sunak's election, had been in government for 12 years. Public opinion in favour of a change in government was reflected in the Conservatives' poor performance at the 2022, 2023 and 2024 local elections.

=== Political background of other parties before the election ===
Keir Starmer won the Labour Party's 2020 leadership election, succeeding Jeremy Corbyn. Starmer repositioned the party away from the left and toward the political centre, and emphasised the elimination of antisemitism within the party. Starmer's leading his party rightward in order to improve its electability has been widely compared to Tony Blair's development of New Labour in the 1990s. The political turmoil from the Conservative scandals and government crises led to Labour having a significant lead in polling over the Conservatives, often by very wide margins, since late 2021, coinciding with the start of the Partygate scandal. Labour made gains in local elections: in the 2023 local elections, Labour gained more than 500 councillors and 22 councils, becoming the largest party in local government for the first time since 2002.

Ed Davey, who previously served in the Cameron–Clegg coalition, won the Liberal Democrats' 2020 leadership election, succeeding Jo Swinson, who lost her seat in the previous general election. Davey prioritised defeating the Conservatives and ruled out working with them following the election. The Liberal Democrats made gains in local elections: in the 2024 local elections, the Liberal Democrats finished second for the first time in a local election cycle since 2009.

Like the Conservatives, the SNP suffered political turmoil and saw a decrease in their popularity in opinion polling, with multiple party leaders and First Ministers (Nicola Sturgeon, Humza Yousaf and John Swinney) and the Operation Branchform police investigation. Sturgeon claimed occupational burnout was the reason for her resignation, while Yousaf resigned amid a government crisis following his termination of a power-sharing agreement with the Scottish Greens. When Swinney assumed the leadership after being elected unopposed to succeed Yousaf, the SNP had been in government for 17 years.

Carla Denyer and Adrian Ramsay took over leadership of the Green Party of England and Wales from Siân Berry and Jonathan Bartley in 2021. Rhun ap Iorwerth took over leadership of Plaid Cymru. The Brexit Party rebranded as Reform UK, and was initially led by Richard Tice in the years preceding the election before Nigel Farage resumed leadership during the election campaign. Edwin Poots took over as the Democratic Unionist Party leader in May 2021 but lasted only 20 days. He was replaced by Jeffrey Donaldson, who resigned in March 2024 after being arrested on charges relating to historical sex offences (which he was convicted of in 2026). He appeared in court on 3 July, the day before polling day, to face additional sex offence charges. Gavin Robinson initially took over as interim leader, and then became the permanent leader in May.

New political parties who made their campaign debuts in this election included the Alba Party, led by former Scottish First Minister Alex Salmond, and the Workers Party of Britain, led by anti-war activist George Galloway, who won the 2024 Rochdale by-election in a political upset three months before the election was called – advertising himself as a protest candidate against Labour's stance on the Gaza war and appealing to the constituency's sizeable Muslim population.

=== Changes to the composition of the House of Commons before the election ===
This table relates to the composition of the House of Commons at the 2019 general election and its dissolution on 30 May 2024 and summarises the changes in party affiliation that took place during the 2019–2024 Parliament.

Affiliation	Members		
Affiliation	Elected in 2019	At dissolution in 2024 (Note: On 29 May 2024, the UK Parliamentary website stated there were 345 Conservative MPs and 205 Labour MPs. However it describes Lloyd Russell-Moyle and Mark Logan as Labour and Conservative MPs respectively at the time of dissolution, despite Logan having defected from the Conservatives and Rusell-Moyle having lost the Labour Party whip prior to dissolution.)	Difference
Conservative	365	344	▼21
Labour (Note: Includes 24 MPs sponsored by the Co-operative Party, who are designated Labour and Co-operative.)	202	205	▲3
SNP	48	43	▼5
Independent	0	17 (Note: At the time of the dissolution of Parliament on 30 May 2024, eight of the independent MPs had been elected as Conservatives at the 2019 general election, including Andrew Bridgen, who defected to Reclaim in May 2023 but left the party in December 2023 and for the remainder of the 2019–2024 Parliament sat as an independent. The remaining nine independent MPs all came from the opposition benches.)	▲17
Liberal Democrats	11	15	▲4
DUP	8	7	▼1
Sinn Féin	7	7	Steady
Plaid Cymru	4	3	▼1
SDLP	2	2	Steady
Alba	Did not exist	2 (Note: Both of the Alba Party's MPs, Kenny MacAskill and Neale Hanvey, were elected for the Scottish National Party (SNP) before leaving to join Alba in 2021.)	▲2
Alliance (NI)	1	1	Steady
Green (E&W)	1	1	Steady
Speaker	1	1	Steady
Reform (Note: Known as the Brexit Party at the 2019 election.)	0	1	▲1
Workers Party	Did not exist	1	▲1
Vacant	0	0	Steady
Total	650	650	Steady
Total voting (Note: In 2019-24, the seven members of Sinn Féin followed a policy of abstentionism. They did not swear into the house, and did not take part in its formal processes (to do so would have compelled a by-election). The speaker and deputy speakers (at this Parliament's dissolution, three Conservative and one Labour) by convention exercise only a casting vote.)	639	638	▼1 (Note: Deputy speaker Eleanor Laing (Con., Chair of Ways and Means) was on an extended leave of absence, and Roger Gale (Con.) served as an additional acting deputy speaker from December 2022 until the end of the Parliament.)
Majority	87	44	▼43

== Date of the election ==
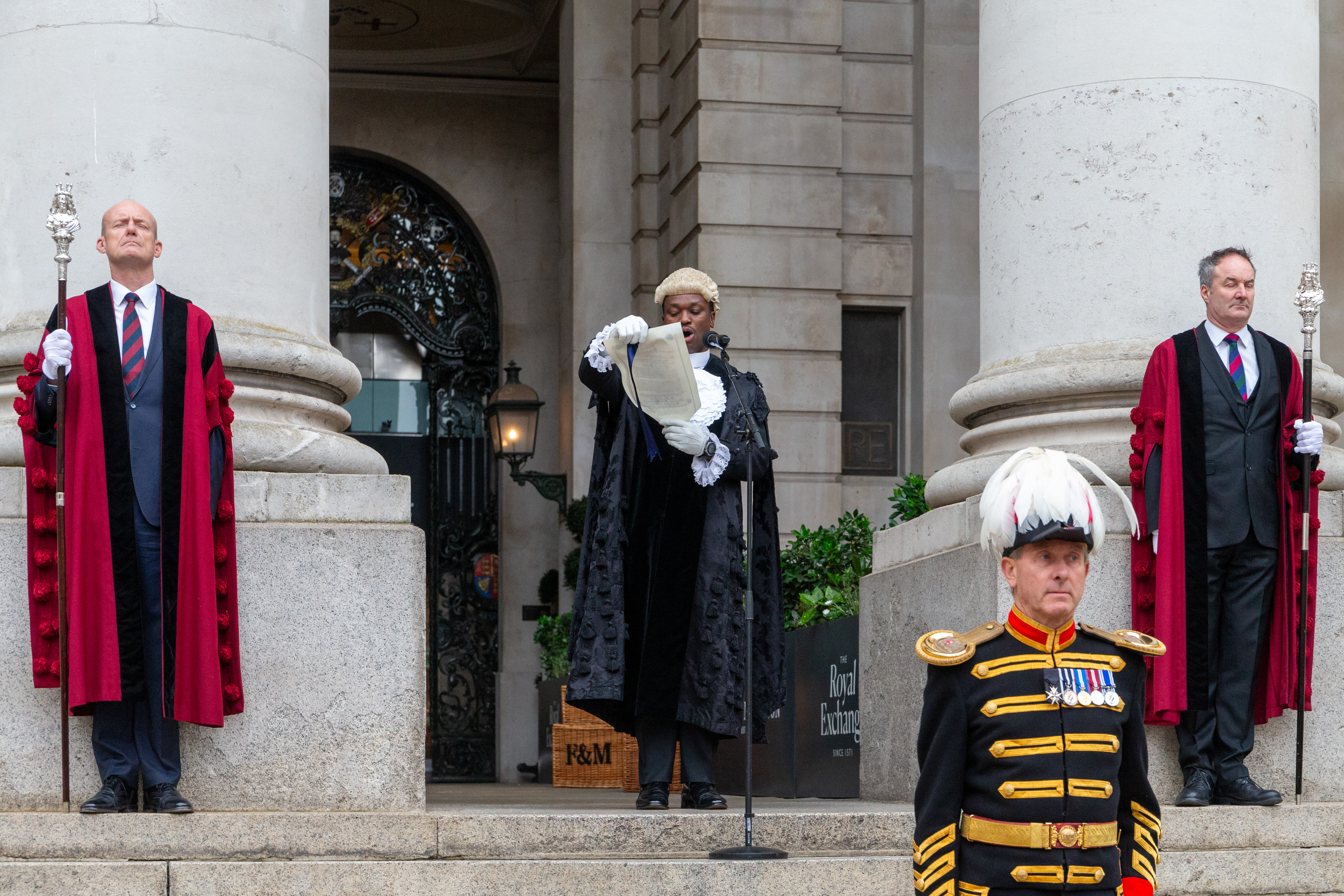
Reading of the dissolution proclamation on the steps of the Royal Exchange

Originally, the next election was scheduled to take place on 2 May 2024 under the Fixed-term Parliaments Act 2011. (Note: The Fixed-term Parliaments Act automatically scheduled general elections for the first Thursday in May of the fifth year after the previous general election. The previous election was held in December 2019.) At the 2019 general election, in which the Conservatives won a majority of 80 seats, the party's manifesto contained a commitment to repeal the Fixed-term Parliaments Act. In December 2020, the government duly published a draft Fixed-term Parliaments Act 2011 (Repeal) Bill, later retitled the Dissolution and Calling of Parliament Act 2022. This entered into force on 24 March 2022. Thus, the prime minister can again request the monarch to dissolve Parliament and call an early election with 25 working days' notice. Section 4 of the Act provided: "If it has not been dissolved earlier, a Parliament dissolves at the beginning of the day that is the fifth anniversary of the day on which it first met". The Electoral Commission confirmed that the 2019 Parliament would, therefore, have to be dissolved, at the latest, by 17 December 2024, and that the next general election had to take place no later than 28 January 2025.

With no election date fixed in law, there was speculation as to when the prime minister, Rishi Sunak, would call an election. On 18 December 2023, Sunak told journalists that the election would take place in 2024 rather than January 2025. On 4 January, he first suggested the general election would probably be in the second half of 2024. Throughout 2024, political commentators and MPs expected the election to be held in the autumn. On 22 May 2024, following much speculation through the day (including being asked about it by Stephen Flynn at Prime Minister's Questions), Sunak officially announced the election would be held on 4 July with the dissolution of the Parliament on 30 May.

The deadline for candidate nominations was 7 June 2024, with political campaigning for four weeks until polling day on 4 July. On the day of the election, polling stations across the country were open from 7 am, and closed at 10 pm. The date chosen for the 2024 general election made it the first to be held in July since the 1945 general election almost exactly seventy-nine years earlier. A total of 4,515 candidates were nominated, more than in any previous general election.

=== Timetable ===
Key dates
Date	Event
22 May	Prime Minister Rishi Sunak requests a dissolution of parliament from King Charles III and announces the date of polling day for the general election as 4 July.
24 May	Last sitting day of business (wash-up period) in the 2019–2024 Parliament. Parliament prorogued.
25 May	Beginning of pre-election period (also known as purdah).
30 May	Dissolution of parliament and official start of the campaign. Royal Proclamation issued dissolving the 2019 Parliament, summoning the 2024 Parliament and setting the date for its first meeting.
7 June	Nominations of candidates close (4 pm). Publication of statement of persons nominated, including notice of poll and situation of polling stations (5 pm).
13 June	Deadline to register to vote at 11:59 pm in Northern Ireland.
18 June	Deadline to register to vote.
19 June	Deadline to apply for a postal vote.
26 June	Deadline to register for a proxy vote at 5 pm. Exemptions applied for emergencies.
4 July	Polling Day – polls open from 7 am to 10 pm.
4–5 July	Results announced in 648 of 650 constituencies.
5 July	Labour wins election with an eventual 172-seat majority. End of pre-election period (also known as purdah). Sir Keir Starmer is appointed Prime Minister by King Charles III and forms a new government following the resignation of Rishi Sunak.
6 July	Results announced for final two undeclared seats, following recounts.
9 July	First meeting of the new Parliament of the United Kingdom for the formal election of Speaker of the House of Commons. Sir Lindsay Hoyle is re-elected unopposed and calls on Starmer and Sunak to speak as Prime Minister and Leader of the Opposition respectively for the first time.
9–16 July	MPs taking their seat are sworn in.
17 July	State Opening of Parliament and King's Speech.

== Electoral system ==
General elections in the United Kingdom are organised using first-past-the-post voting. The Conservative Party, which won a majority at the 2019 general election, included pledges in its manifesto to remove the 15-year limit on voting for British citizens living abroad, and to introduce a voter identification requirement in Great Britain. These changes were included in the Elections Act 2022.

=== Boundary reviews ===
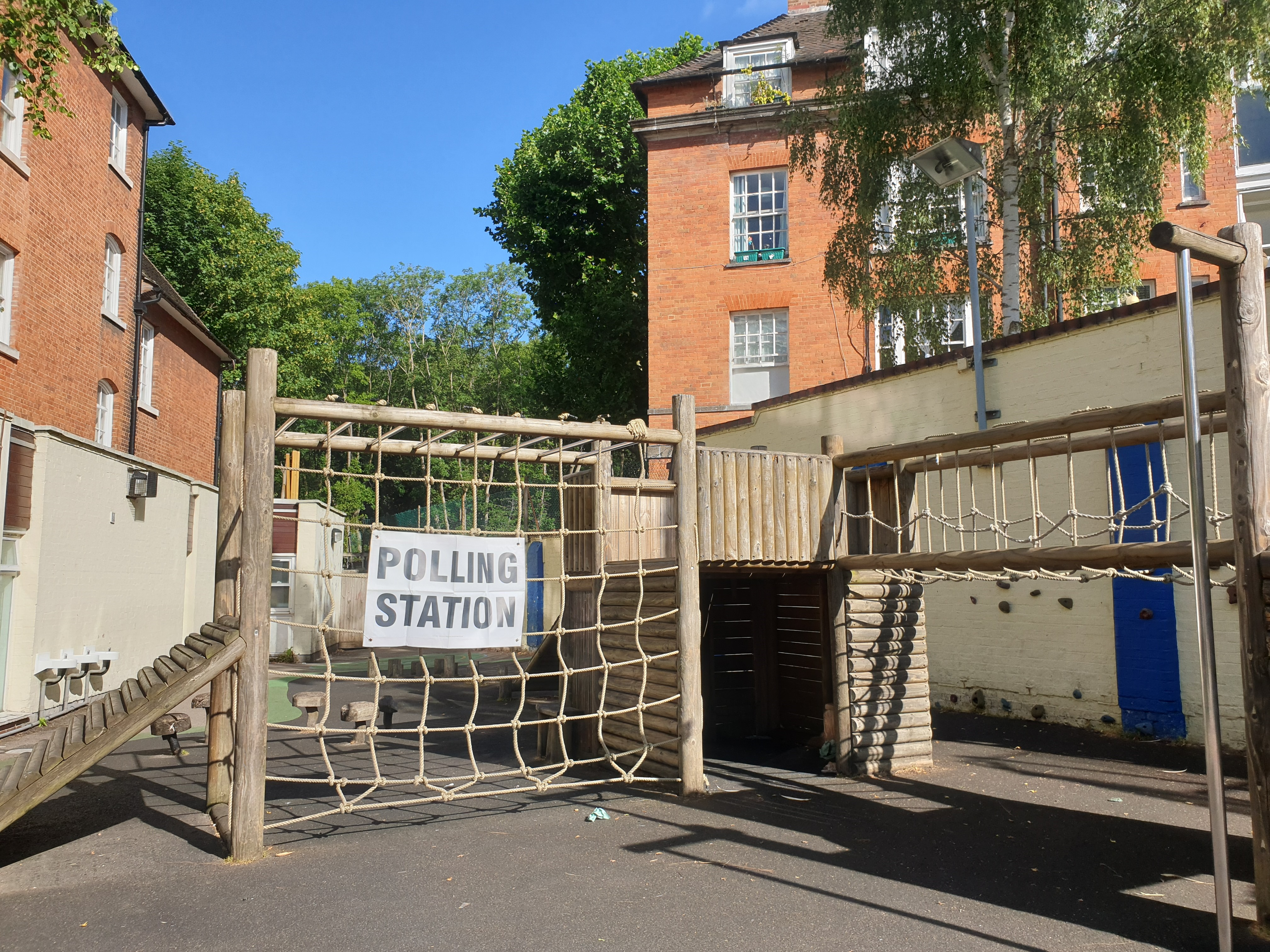
A school being used as a polling station on election day in the constituency of Hampstead and Highgate. The polling station had been in a different constituency before the boundary review.

The Periodic Review of Westminster constituencies, which proposed reducing the number of constituencies from 650 to 600, commenced in 2011 but was paused in January 2013. Following the 2015 general election, each of the four parliamentary boundary commissions of the United Kingdom recommenced their review process in April 2016. The four commissions submitted their final recommendations to the Secretary of State on 5 September 2018 and made their reports public a week later. However, the proposals were never put forward for approval before the calling of the general election held on 12 December 2019, and in December 2020 the reviews were formally abandoned under the Schedule to the Parliamentary Constituencies Act 2020. A projection by psephologists Colin Rallings and Michael Thrasher of how the 2017 votes would have translated to seats under the 2018 boundaries suggested the changes would have been beneficial to the Conservatives and detrimental to Labour.

In March 2020, Cabinet Office minister Chloe Smith confirmed that the 2023 review of Westminster constituencies would be based on retaining 650 seats. The previous relevant legislation was amended by the Parliamentary Constituencies Act 2020 and the four boundary commissions formally launched their 2023 reviews on 5 January 2021. They were required to issue their final reports prior to 1 July 2023. Once the reports had been laid before Parliament, Orders in Council giving effect to the final proposals had to be made within four months, unless "there are exceptional circumstances". Prior to the Parliamentary Constituencies Act 2020, boundary changes could not be implemented until they were approved by both Houses of Parliament. The boundary changes were approved at a meeting of the Privy Council on 15 November 2023 and came into force on 29 November 2023, meaning that the election was contested on these new boundaries.

==== Notional 2019 results ====
The notional results of the 2019 election, if they had taken place under boundaries recommended by the Sixth Periodic Review

The election was contested under new constituency boundaries established by the 2023 review of Westminster constituencies. Consequently, media outlets reported seat gains and losses as compared to notional results. These are estimates of the results if all votes cast in 2019 were unchanged, but regrouped by the new constituency boundaries. Since notional results in the vote counts at parliamentary elections in the UK do not yield figures at any level more specific than that of the whole constituency, it is only possible to estimate the notional results, with the assistance of local election results.

In England, seats were redistributed towards Southern England, away from Northern England, due to the different rates of population growth. North West England and North East England lost two seats each, whereas South East England gained seven and South West England gained three. Based on historical voting patterns, this was expected to help the Conservatives. Using the new boundaries, different parties would have won several constituencies with unchanged names but changed boundaries from the 2019 election. For example, the Conservatives would have won Wirral West and Leeds North West instead of the Labour Party, but Labour would have won Pudsey and Heywood & Middleton instead of the Conservatives. Westmorland and Lonsdale, the constituency represented by former Liberal Democrat leader Tim Farron, was notionally a Conservative seat.

In Scotland, 57 MPs were elected, down from the 59 in 2019, with the following notional partisan composition of Scotland's parliamentary delegation. The SNP would have remained steady on 48 seats despite two of its constituencies being dissolved. The Scottish Conservatives' seat count of six would likewise remained unchanged. Scottish Labour would have retained Edinburgh South, the sole constituency they won in 2019. Had the 2019 general election occurred with the new boundaries in effect, the Scottish Liberal Democrats would have only won two seats (Edinburgh West and Orkney and Shetland), instead of the four they did win that year, as the expanded electorates in the other two would overcome their slender majorities.

Under the new boundaries, Wales lost eight seats, electing 32 MPs instead of the 40 it elected in 2019. Welsh Labour would have won 18 instead of the 22 MPs it elected in 2019, and the Welsh Conservatives 12 instead of 14. Due to the abolition and merging of rural constituencies in West Wales, Plaid Cymru would have only won two seats instead of four. Nonetheless, the boundary changes were expected to cause difficulty for the Conservatives as more pro-Labour areas were added to some of their strongest seats.

In Northern Ireland, the notional results are identical to the actual results of the 2019 general election in Northern Ireland.

Notional 2019 results on 2023 boundaries
Party	2019 MPs		
Party	Actual	Notional	Difference
Conservative	365	372	▲7
Labour	202	200	▼2
SNP	48	48	Steady
Liberal Democrats	11	8	▼3
DUP	8	8	Steady
Sinn Féin	7	7	Steady
Plaid Cymru	4	2	▼2
SDLP	2	2	Steady
Green (E&W)	1	1	Steady
Alliance	1	1	Steady
Speaker	1	1	Steady

== Campaign ==
=== Overview ===
Major party election spending
Party	£ (millions)	Percent of total
Labour	30.1	31.8%
Conservative and Unionist	23.9	25.3%
Liberal Democrats	5.6	6.0%
Reform UK	5.5	5.8%
Green	1.7	1.8%
Scottish National	0.8	0.8%
Co-operative	0.3	0.3%
Total (all party, non-party and candidate)	94.5	

Labour entered the election with a large lead over the Conservatives in opinion polls, and the potential scale of the party's victory was a topic of discussion during the campaign period. The economy, healthcare, education, infrastructure development, environment, housing, energy, and immigration, and standards in public office were main campaign topics. The Conservative campaign led by Rishi Sunak focused primarily on attacks towards Labour over alleged tax plans including a – robustly disputed – claim that Labour would cost households £2,000 more in tax.

Keir Starmer used the word "change" as his campaign slogan and offered voters the chance to "turn the page" by voting Labour. The Liberal Democrat campaign led by Ed Davey was dominated by his campaign stunts, which were used to bring attention to campaign topics. When asked about these stunts, Davey said: "Politicians need to take the concerns and interests of voters seriously but I'm not sure they need to take themselves seriously all the time and I'm quite happy to have some fun." Party manifesto and fiscal spending plans were independently analysed by the Institute for Fiscal Studies and their environmental policies were assessed by Friends of the Earth.

=== Announcement ===
On the afternoon of 22 May 2024, Sunak announced that he had asked the King to call a general election for 4 July 2024, surprising his own MPs. Though Sunak had the option to wait until December 2024 to call the election, he said that he decided on the date because he believed that the economy was improving, and that "falling inflation and net migration figures would reinforce the Conservative Party's election message of 'sticking to the plan'". The calling of the election was welcomed by all major parties.

Sunak's announcement took place during heavy rain at a lectern outside 10 Downing Street, without the use of any shelter from the downpour. The D:Ream song "Things Can Only Get Better" (previously used by the Labour Party in its successful 1997 general election campaign) was being played loudly in the background by the political activist Steve Bray as Sunak announced the date of the general election. This led to the song reaching number two on UK's iTunes Charts.

=== 22–29 May ===
At the beginning of the campaign, Labour had a significant lead in polling over the Conservatives. Polling also showed Labour doing well against the SNP in Scotland. When visiting Windermere, Davey fell off a paddleboard, while campaigning to highlight the issue of sewage discharges into rivers and lakes. A couple of days later, Davey won media attention when going down a Slip 'N Slide, while drawing attention to deteriorating mental health among children.

On 23 May, Sunak said that before the election there would be no flights to Rwanda for those seeking asylum. Immigration figures were published for 2023 showing immigration remained at historically high levels, but had fallen compared to 2022. Nigel Farage announced that he would not be standing in the general election, preferring to focus on campaigning for the 2024 United States presidential election instead. However, Farage later announced on 3 June that, contrary to his statement earlier in the campaign, he would stand for Parliament in Clacton, and that he had resumed leadership of Reform UK, taking over from Richard Tice, who remained the party's chairman. Farage also predicted that Labour would win the election, whilst stating the Conservatives were incapable of being the Official Opposition due to having spent "much of the last five years fighting each other rather than fighting for the interests of this country." Also on 23 May, Davey launched the Liberal Democrat campaign in Cheltenham in Gloucestershire. The SNP campaign launch the same day was overshadowed by a dispute around leader John Swinney's support for embattled MSP Michael Matheson and developments in Operation Branchform, the investigation into potential misuse of campaign funds by Nicola Sturgeon and her husband. Starmer launched the Labour Party campaign in Gillingham at the Priestfield Stadium.

On 24 May, the Conservatives proposed setting up a Royal Commission to consider a form of mandatory national service. It would be made up of two streams for 18-year-olds to choose from, either 'community volunteering' by volunteering with organisations such as the NHS, fire service, ambulance, search and rescue, and critical local infrastructure, or 'military training' in areas like logistics and cyber security. Former Labour leader Jeremy Corbyn announced on 24 May he was standing as an independent in Islington North against a Labour candidate, and was thus expelled from the party.

On 27 May, Starmer made a keynote speech on security and other issues. On 28 May, the Conservatives pledged a "Triple Lock Plus" where the personal income tax allowance for pensioners would always stay higher than the state pension. Davey went paddleboarding on Lake Windermere in the marginal constituency of Westmorland and Lonsdale, highlighting the release of sewage in waterways. He pledged to abolish Ofwat and introduce a new water regulator to tackle the situation, in addition to proposing a ban on bonuses for chief executives of water companies. Starmer was in West Sussex and emphasised his small town roots in his first big campaign speech.

On 29 May, Labour's Wes Streeting promised a 18-week NHS waiting target within five years of a Labour government. Labour also pledged to double the number of NHS scanners in England. On the same day Starmer denied that Diane Abbott had been blocked as a candidate amid differing reports. Abbott had been elected as a Labour MP, but had been suspended from the parliamentary party for a brief period. There was controversy about further Labour Party candidate selections, with several candidates on the left of the party being excluded. Abbott said she had been barred from standing as a Labour Party candidate at the election, but Starmer later said she would be "free" to stand as a Labour candidate.

=== 30 May – 5 June ===
On 30 May, both the Conservatives and Labour ruled out any rise in value-added tax. Màiri McAllan claimed that only her party, the SNP, offered Scotland a route back into the European Union, making Pro-Europeanism part of the party's campaign. Reform UK proposed an immigration tax on British firms who employ foreign workers. Carla Denyer and Adrian Ramsay launched the Green Party of England and Wales campaign in Bristol. Rhun ap Iorwerth launched the Plaid Cymru campaign in Bangor. George Galloway launched the Workers Party of Britain campaign in Ashton-under-Lyne.

On 31 May, the Conservatives announced new "pride in places" pledges, including new rules to tackle anti-social behaviour, rolling out the hot-spot policing programme to more areas, and more town regeneration projects. The Conservatives also unveiled plans for fly-tippers to get points on their driving licences and other new measures to protect the environment.

On 2 June, Labour pledged to reduce record high legal immigration to the United Kingdom by improving training for British workers. Net migration to the UK was 685,000 in 2023. Labour also focused on national security, with Starmer reaffirming his commitment to a "nuclear deterrent triple lock", including building four new nuclear submarines. A YouGov poll conducted on the same day put Labour on course for the party's biggest election victory in history, beating Tony Blair's 1997 landslide.

On 4 June, Farage launched his campaign in Clacton. He predicted the previous day that Reform UK would be the Official Opposition following the election as opposed to the Conservatives, saying that the Conservatives were incapable of being the Opposition due to "spending most of the last five years fighting each other rather than fighting for the interests of this country".

=== 6–12 June ===
On 6 June, the Green Party announced plans to invest an extra £50 billion a year for the NHS by raising taxes on the top 1% of earners. The Conservatives announced a policy on expanding child benefit for higher-earners. Labour also announced communities will be given powers to transform derelict areas into parks and green spaces. Labour's countryside protection plan would also include the planting new national forests, taskforces for tree-planting and flood resilience, new river pathways, and a commitment to revive nature. Green spaces would be a requirement in the development of new housing and town plans.

Both Sunak and Starmer attended D-Day commemorations in Normandy on 6 June, the 80th anniversary of Operation Neptune. Sunak angered veterans and was widely criticised for leaving early to do an interview with ITV. Starmer met with Volodymyr Zelenskyy and King Charles III during the D-Day commemorations, and said that Sunak "has to answer for his actions". Sunak apologised the next day and apologised again on 10 June. He made a third apology on 12 June.

Farage was among those critical of Sunak over his leaving the D-Day events, saying on 7 June that Sunak did not understand "our culture". Conservative and Labour politicians criticised these words as being a racist attack on Sunak, which Farage denied. On 10 June, Labour pledged 100,000 new childcare places and more than 3,000 new nurseries as part of its childcare plan. It also announced its Child Health Action Plan, which included providing every school with a qualified mental health counsellor, boosting preventative mental health services, transforming NHS dentistry, legislating for a progressive ban on smoking (a bill proposed by the Conservative government which had not passed before Parliament was prorogued), banning junk food advertising to children, and banning energy drinks for under-16s.

Labour released its plan for small business on 8 June, which included pledges to replace the current business rates system and to tackle the skill shortage by creating a new public body, Skills England. They also pledged to revitalise Britain's high streets and a new trade strategy.

The Liberal Democrat manifesto For a Fair Deal was released on 10 June. It included commitments on free personal care in England, investment in the NHS including more GPs, increased funding for education and childcare (including a tutoring guarantee for children from low-income families), increased funding for public services, tax reforms, reaching net zero by 2045 (5 years before the current government target of 2050), investing in green infrastructure, innovation, training and skills across the UK to boost economic growth, and removing the two-child limit on tax and benefits. The Liberal Democrats also offered a lifelong skills grant, giving adults £5,000 to spend on improving their skills. The party wants electoral reform, and pledged to introduce proportional representation for electing MPs, and local councillors in England, and cap donations to political parties.

Sunak released the Conservative manifesto Clear Plan. Bold Action. Secure Future. on 11 June, addressing the economy, taxes, welfare, expanding free childcare, education, healthcare, environment, energy, transport, community, and crime. They pledged to lower taxes, increase education and NHS spending, deliver 92,000 more nurses and 28,000 more doctors, introduce a new model of National Service, continue to expand apprenticeships and vocational training, simplify the planning system to speed up infrastructure projects (digital, transport and energy), and to treble Britain's offshore wind capacity and support solar energy. The manifesto includes a pledge to abolish Stamp Duty on homes worth up to £425,000 for first time buyers and expand the Help to Buy scheme. The Conservatives also pledged a recruitment of 8,000 new police officers and a rollout of facial recognition technology. Much of what has been proposed is already incorporated in the 2023 and 2024 budget.

Carla Denyer and Adrian Ramsay released the Green Party's manifesto Real Hope. Real Change. on 12 June, which pledged more taxes on the highest earners, generating £70 billion a year to help tackle climate change and the NHS. They also pledged increased spending for public services, free personal care in England, renationalisation of railway, water and energy, a green society, a wealth tax, a carbon tax, and a windfall tax on the profit of banks. The manifesto promises quicker access to NHS dentistry and GPs and reductions in the hospital waiting list. They would also reach net zero by 2040 and introduce rent controls.

On 12 June Conservative minister Grant Shapps said in a radio interview that voters should support the Conservatives so as to prevent Labour winning "a super-majority", meaning a large majority (the UK Parliament does not have any formal supermajority rules). This was interpreted by journalists as a possible and surprising admission of defeat. It paralleled social media advertising by the Conservatives that also focused on urging votes not to give Starmer a large majority.

=== 13–19 June ===
On 13 June, Starmer released the Labour Party manifesto Change. It focused on economic growth, planning system reforms, infrastructure, clean energy, healthcare, education, childcare, crime, and strengthening workers' rights. It pledged a new publicly owned energy company (Great British Energy) and National Wealth Fund, a "Green Prosperity Plan", rebuilding the NHS and reducing patient waiting times, free breakfast clubs in primary schools, investing in green infrastructure, innovation, training and skills across the UK to boost economic growth, and renationalisation of the railway network (Great British Railways). It includes wealth creation and "pro-business and pro-worker" policies. The manifesto also pledged to give votes to 16-year olds, reform the House of Lords, and to tax private schools, with money generated going into improving state education. The party guaranteed giving all areas of England devolution powers, in areas such as integrated transport, planning, skills, and health.

On 17 June, Farage and Tice released the Reform UK manifesto, which they called a "contract". Our Contract with You pledged to lower taxes, lower immigration, increase funding for public services, reform the NHS and decrease its waiting lists down to zero, bring utilities and critical national infrastructure under 50% public ownership (the other 50% owned by pension funds), replace the House of Lords with a more democratic second chamber, and to replace first-past-the-post voting with a system of proportional representation. It also pledged to accelerate transport infrastructure in coastal regions, Wales, the North, and the Midlands. The party also wants to freeze non-essential immigration and recruit 40,000 new police officers. Reform UK are the only major party to oppose the current net zero target made by the government. Instead, it pledged to support the environment with more tree planting, more recycling and less single-use plastics. Farage predicted Labour would win the election, but said he was planning to campaign for the next election.

Labour's Rachel Reeves claimed Labour's green plans would create over 650,000 jobs. The Liberal Democrats offered more cost-of-living help for rural communities. Davey highlighted his manifesto pledge to build 380,000 new homes a year, 150,000 of which would be social homes. On 18 June, Labour pledged hundreds of new banking hubs, to ''breathe life'' into high streets. Labour also promised a large increase of renewable energy jobs, backed by new green apprenticeships.

On 19 June, both the SNP and Sinn Féin released their manifestos. Swinney said a vote for his party would "intensify" the pressure to secure a second Scottish independence referendum, with other pledges in the SNP manifesto including boosting NHS funding, scrapping the two-child limit on benefits, calling for an immediate ceasefire in the Gaza Strip, scrapping the Trident defence programme, re-joining the European Union, transitioning to a green economy attracting more foreign migrants, tackling drug deaths and devolving broadcasting powers. The Sinn Féin manifesto called for greater devolution to Northern Ireland and for the UK and Irish governments to set a date for a referendum on the unification of Northern Ireland with the Republic of Ireland.

Galloway released the Workers Party manifesto, Britain Deserves Better, which promised to improve "poverty pay" and provide more social housing. It pledged the renationalisation of utility companies, free school meals for all children without means testing, free adult education, and to hold a referendum on the continued existence of the monarchy and proportional representation for elections.

David T. C. Davies, the Secretary of State for Wales, told a BBC interview the polls were "clearly pointing at a large Labour majority", but added that he believed there was "no great optimism" from voters. A potentially large Labour majority was also acknowledged by Jeremy Hunt, the Chancellor of the Exchequer, and Mel Stride, the Secretary of State for Work and Pensions. Alison McGarry, the Labour chair of Islington North, resigned from the Labour Party after being spotted campaigning for Corbyn; she resigned rather than face expulsion for breaking the party's rules on campaigning for a rival candidate.

=== 20–26 June ===
On 20 June, the parties focused on housing. Labour pledged action to protect renters with new legal protections for tenants. It would immediately ban Section 21 "no-fault" evictions, as part of plans to reform the private rented sector in England. Labour also pledged to reform planning laws and build 1.5 million homes to spread homeownership. They would also ensure new housing is supported by new local infrastructure (public transport, healthcare, schools), and pledged to build more housing near railway stations and on the 'grey belt' (disused car parks or industrial estates). The Conservatives offered stronger legal protections for tenants, including banning Section 21 "no-fault" evictions. They said they would build 1.6 million new homes (including social housing) with new local infrastructure, prioritising brownfield development, while protecting the countryside. The Liberal Democrats offered more protections for tenants, additional social housing, and more garden cities.

Also on 20 June, the Alliance Party in Northern Ireland launched their manifesto. Its core policies include reforming the political institutions, dedicated funding for integrated education, a Green New Deal to decarbonise Northern Ireland's economy, childcare reforms, and lowering the voting age to 16.

On 21 June, in an interview, Farage repeated comments he had made previously stating that the West and NATO provoked Russia's invasion of Ukraine. He was criticised for this by Sunak and Starmer. He also stated that Reform UK would lower the tax burden to encourage people into work. Farage stated in another interview that he would remove university tuition fees if he won power for those studying science, technology, engineering, medicine or maths. Reform UK have already pledged to scrap interest on student loans and to extend the loan capital repayment periods to 45 years. Farage also declared his ambition for Reform UK to replace the Conservatives as the biggest right-wing party in Parliament.

The Conservatives pledged a review of licensing laws and planning rules aimed at boosting pubs, restaurants and music venues. Labour framed its 10-year science and R&D budget plans as part of its industrial strategy, with an aim of boosting workforce and regional development. Labour and the Liberal Democrats also focused on water pollution and improving England's water quality. Labour pledged to put failing water companies who do not meet ''high environmental standards'' under special measures, give regulators new powers to block the payment of bonuses to executives who pollute waterways, and criminal charges against persistent law breakers. They also ensured independent monitoring of every outlet.

On 24 June, Labour focused on NHS dentistry and health, pledged to hold a knife crime summit every year and halve incidents within a decade. The Greens pledged to end 'dental deserts' with £3 billion for new NHS contracts.

The Liberal Democrats launched a mini-manifesto for carers. It pledged to establish an independent living taskforce to help people live independently in their own homes, a new care worker's minimum wage to raise their pay by £2 an hour, and a new National Care Agency. Sunak released the Scottish Conservatives' manifesto. Starmer discussed a proposed Football Governance Bill, which will establish the new Independent Football Regulator. The Conservatives and Liberal Democrats have also committed to introducing an Independent Football Regulator. The Liberal Democrats pledged to establish a series of "creative enterprise zones" across the UK to regenerate cultural output.

On 26 June, Alex Salmond released the Alba Party manifesto. It pledged to increase funding for public services, increase NHS staffing, provide an annual £500 payment to households receiving the council tax reduction at a cost of £250 million, increase the Scottish Child Payment, reducing fuel bills, a new Scottish clean energy public company, and Scottish Independence.

Starmer pledged GP reforms, including the training of thousands more GPs, updating the NHS App, and bringing back the 'family doctor'. Labour would also trial new "neighbourhood health centres". The Social Democratic and Labour Party also launched their manifesto on 26 June in Northern Ireland. It pledged a 'Marshall Plan' to tackle health, institutional reform, stronger environmental protection with an independent Environmental Protection Agency, and improving NI's financial settlement.

=== 27 June – 4 July ===
On 27 June, Labour pledged to reform careers advice and work experience in schools for one million pupils, committing to deliver two weeks' worth of quality work experience for every young person, and recruit more than thousands of new careers advisers. This is part of the party's wider plan to establish a "youth guarantee" of access to training, an apprenticeship or support to find work for all 18 to 21-year-olds.

On 27 June, an undercover Channel 4 journalist secretly recorded members of Farage's campaign team using offensive racial, Islamophobic and homophobic language, also suggesting refugees should be used as "target practice". In a statement, Farage said that he was "dismayed" at the "reprehensible" language. Tice said that racist comments were "inappropriate". Farage later accused Channel 4 of a "set-up", stating that one of the canvassers, Andrew Parker, had been an actor. Farage stated that Parker had been "acting from the moment he came into the office", and cited video of Parker performing "rough-speaking" from his acting website. Channel 4 denied that Parker was known to them prior to the report. Regarding other members of his campaign team, Farage stated that the individuals in question had "watched England play football, they were in the pub, they were drunk, it was crass."

On 29 June, the Liberal Democrats called for an 'emergency NHS budget' to hire more GPs. Starmer hosted a major campaign rally, and stated in The Guardian "if you vote Labour on Thursday, the work of change begins. We will launch a new national mission to create wealth in every community. We'll get to work on repairing our public services with an immediate cash injection, alongside urgent reforms. And we will break with recent years by always putting country before party".

The Greens announced a 'Charter for Small Business', which pledged £2 billion per year in grant funding for local authorities, regional mutual banks for investment in decarbonisation and local economic sustainability, and increasing annual public subsidies for rail and bus travel to £10 billion. They also pledged free bus travel for under-18s. The Northern Ireland Conservatives also launched their manifesto. On 30 June, the Liberal Democrats pledged to double funding for Bereavement Support Payments, and to spend £440 million a year on support for bereaved families.

On 2 July, the Greens announced its £8 billion education package would include scrapping tuition fees, providing free school meals for all children, a qualified counsellor in every school and college, and new special needs provision. They also want to end formal testing in primary and secondary schools with a system of continuous assessment. Former prime minister Boris Johnson campaigned for the Conservatives. On 3 July, the political parties made their closing arguments on the last day of campaigning, with Sunak stating he would "take full responsibility" for the result. At the end of the campaign, Labour maintained their significant lead in polling over the Conservatives, and had endorsements from celebrities, including Elton John.

On 4 July, less than an hour before polls closed, Sunak's government announced the 2024 Dissolution Honours, with life peerages being given to 19 people, including former prime minister Theresa May and Cass Review author Hilary Cass.

== Betting scandal ==
On 12 June 2024, it was reported that Conservative candidate and Parliamentary Private Secretary to the Prime Minister, Craig Williams had placed a £100 bet on the date of the election being in July, three days before the date was announced. The bet was referred to the Gambling Commission to determine whether Williams had placed the bet based on confidential information, which could constitute a criminal offence. Williams apologised for the bet, but neither he nor Sunak would answer whether he had inside information.

On 19 June, a police protection officer assigned to Sunak was arrested for betting on the election date. On the same day, it was also announced that Laura Saunders, the Conservative candidate for Bristol North West, was being investigated for betting on the election date. Her husband, Tony Lee, was also being investigated by the Gambling Commission and took a leave of absence from his role as the party's director of campaigning on 19 June.

Over the following two weeks, it was reported that dozens of further Conservative Party-linked officials were being investigated by the Gambling Commission, including Conservative Party's chief data officer, Nick Mason; The Times reported that the investigation was being widened to hundreds of suspicious bets. On 25 June, both Williams and Saunders had their support for their candidacies withdrawn by the Conservative Party.

In April 2025, Williams and 14 others were charged with offences under the Gambling Act 2005.

== Debates and interviews ==
=== Debates ===
← 2019 debates	2024

Rishi Sunak challenged Keir Starmer to six televised debates. Starmer announced that he would not agree to such a proposal, and offered two head-to-head debates—one shown on the BBC, and one shown on ITV; a spokesperson said both networks would offer the greatest audience, and the prospect of any debates on smaller channels would be rejected as it would not be a "valuable use of campaign time". Ed Davey declared his wish to be included in "any televised debates", although he would ultimately only be featured in one debate.

On 29 May, it was announced that the first leaders' debate would be hosted by ITV News with Julie Etchingham as moderator, on 4 June. Key topics were the cost of living crisis, the National Health Service (NHS), young people, education, immigration and tax policy. Sunak said that Labour would cost households £2000 more in tax, which Starmer denied. Sunak said this figure was calculated by "independent Treasury officials". Fact checkers disputed the sum, stating it was based on assumptions made by political appointees and that the figure was over a four-year period. On 5 June, the BBC reported that James Bowler, the Treasury permanent secretary, wrote that "civil servants were not involved in the [...] calculation of the total figure used" and that "any costings derived from other sources or produced by other organisations should not be presented as having been produced by the Civil Service". The Office for Statistics Regulation also criticised the claim on the grounds that it was presented without the listener knowing it was a sum over 4 years. A YouGov snap poll after the debate indicated that 46% of debate viewers thought Sunak had performed better, and 45% believed Starmer had performed better. A Savanta poll published the next day favoured Starmer 44% to Sunak 39%. The debate was watched by 5.37 million viewers, making it the most-viewed programme of the week.

An STV debate hosted by Colin Mackay took place on 3 June, which included Douglas Ross, Anas Sarwar, John Swinney and Alex Cole-Hamilton. Another debate between these leaders (also including Lorna Slater) took place on 11 June, on BBC Scotland, hosted by Stephen Jardine. A BBC debate hosted by Mishal Husain took place on 7 June, which included Nigel Farage, Carla Denyer, Rhun ap Iorwerth, Daisy Cooper, Stephen Flynn, Angela Rayner and Penny Mordaunt. The debate included exchanges between Mordaunt and Rayner over tax, and all the attendees criticised Sunak leaving the D-Day events early; Farage called Sunak's actions "disgraceful" and said veterans had been deserted, Cooper said it was "politically shameful" and Mordaunt said Sunak's choice to leave prematurely had been "completely wrong". After the seven-way debate, a snap poll found that viewers considered Farage had won, followed by Rayner, but that Flynn, Denyer and Cooper scored best on doing a good job. Another debate between these leaders took place on 13 June, with Julie Etchingham as moderator.

On 12 June Sky News hosted a leaders' event in Grimsby hosted by Beth Rigby, including Starmer and Sunak, where they took questions from both Rigby and the audience. The debate covered various topics, including the NHS, the economy, education, immigration, housing and their future plans in government. Starmer started the event by saying he was putting the country ahead of his party, bringing Labour "back into the service of working people". He went on to attack the Conservatives on tax policy, saying that "the Tories are in no position to lecture anyone about tax rises". 64% of those questioned by YouGov immediately following the debate said that Starmer had performed better, compared to 36% who said Sunak had performed better.

Channel 4 News hosted a debate on 18 June with all seven of the main parties focusing solely on the issues of immigration and law and order. Other BBC debates included three Question Time specials, two hosted by Fiona Bruce on 20 and 28 June, and one hosted by Bethan Rhys Roberts on 24 June. The first of the two hosted by Bruce featured four separate half-hour question and answer sessions with Sunak, Starmer, Davey and Swinney; the second of the two hosted by Bruce featured the same format with Ramsay and Farage; the programme hosted by Rhys Roberts featured the same format with ap Iorwerth. There was a BBC Cymru Wales debate on 21 June; and a debate between Sunak and Starmer hosted by Husain took place on 26 June. There was also a BBC debate on 27 June involving the five largest Northern Irish political parties.

2024 United Kingdom general election debates in Great Britain
Date	Broadcaster	Host	Format	Venue	Viewing figures (million)	P Present; I Invited; S Surrogate; NI Not invited; A Absent; N No debate						
Date	Broadcaster	Host	Format	Venue	Viewing figures (million)	Conservative	Labour	SNP	Lib. Dems	Plaid Cymru	Green (E&W, SCO)	Reform UK
3 June	STV	Colin Mackay	Debate	STV Group HQ, Pacific Quay, Glasgow	TBA	P Ross	P Sarwar	P Swinney	P Cole-Hamilton	NI	NI	NI
4 June	ITV	Julie Etchingham	Debate	dock10, MediaCityUK, Salford	5.37	P Sunak	P Starmer	NI	NI	NI	NI	NI
7 June	BBC	Mishal Husain	Debate	Broadcasting House, London	3.25	S Mordaunt	S Rayner	S Flynn	S Cooper	P ap Iorwerth	P Denyer	P Farage
11 June	BBC Scotland (Debate Night Leaders' Special)	Stephen Jardine	Debate	Gilbert Scott Building, Gilmorehill Campus, University of Glasgow, Glasgow (Note: Debate took place in Gilbert Scott Building's Bute Hall.)	TBA	P Ross	P Sarwar	P Swinney	P Cole-Hamilton	NI	P Slater	NI
12 June	Sky News (Note: Not a debate: Sunak and Starmer separately answered questions from the studio audience.)	Beth Rigby	Individual	Grimsby Town Hall, Grimsby	TBA	P Sunak	P Starmer	NI	NI	NI	NI	NI
13 June	ITV	Julie Etchingham	Debate	dock10, MediaCityUK, Salford	2.1	S Mordaunt	S Rayner	S Flynn	S Cooper	P ap Iorwerth	P Denyer	P Farage
16 June	ITV Cymru Wales	Adrian Masters	Debate	ITV Cymru Wales HQ, Cardiff Bay, Cardiff	TBA	S Davies	S Stevens	NI	NI	S Saville Roberts	NI	NI
18 June	Channel 4 (News) (Note: This debate was focused solely on the issues of immigration and law and order.)	Krishnan Guru-Murthy	Debate	Firstsite, Colchester	TBA	S Philp	S Thomas-Symonds	S Brown	S Cooper	P ap Iorwerth	P Denyer	S Tice
20 June	BBC (Question Time Leaders' Special) (Note: Not a debate: the party leaders were each separately asked questions by the studio audience.)	Fiona Bruce	Individual	Ron Cooke Hub, Campus East, University of York, York	TBA	P Sunak	P Starmer	P Swinney	P Davey	NI	NI	NI
21 June	BBC Cymru Wales	Bethan Rhys Roberts	Debate	BBC Cymru Wales New Broadcasting House, Central Square, Cardiff	TBA	P Davies	P Gething	NI	P Dodds	P ap Iorwerth	NI	P Lewis
24 June	The Sun/Talk (Never Mind the Ballots: Election Showdown) (Note: Not a debate: the party leaders were both separately asked questions.)	Harry Cole	Individual	The News Building, London	TBA	P Sunak	P Starmer	NI	NI	NI	NI	NI
24 June	BBC (Question Time Plaid Cymru Leader Special) (Note: Not a debate.)	Bethan Rhys Roberts	Individual	BBC Cymru Wales New Broadcasting House, Central Square, Cardiff	TBA	NI	NI	NI	NI	P ap Iorwerth	NI	NI
26 June	BBC	Mishal Husain	Debate	Newton and Arkwright Buildings, City Campus, Nottingham Trent University, Nottingham	TBA	P Sunak	P Starmer	NI	NI	NI	NI	NI
28 June	BBC (Question Time Leaders' Special) (Note: Not a debate: the party leaders were each separately asked questions by the studio audience.)	Fiona Bruce	Individual	Midlands Arts Centre, Birmingham	TBA	NI	NI	NI	NI	NI	P Ramsay	P Farage

2024 United Kingdom general election debates in Northern Ireland
Date	Organiser	Host	Format	Venue	Viewing figures (millions)	P Present; I Invited; S Surrogate; NI Not invited; A Absent; N No debate				
Date	Organiser	Host	Format	Venue	Viewing figures (millions)	DUP	Sinn Féin	SDLP	UUP	Alliance
23 June	UTV	Vicki Hawthorne	Debate	UTV HQ, City Quays 2, Belfast	TBA	P Robinson	S Finucane	P Eastwood	S Butler	P Long
27 June	BBC Northern Ireland	Tara Mills	Debate	Broadcasting House, Belfast	TBA	P Robinson	S Hazzard	P Eastwood	S Butler	P Long

=== Interviews ===
In addition to the debates, the BBC and ITV broadcast programmes in which the leaders of the main parties were interviewed at length. Nick Robinson did BBC Panorama interviews with all the leaders of the main parties. Sunak's Tonight interview with Paul Brand drew substantial coverage in the week prior to broadcast, as Sunak controversially departed the D-Day commemorations early to attend. It was later revealed that the interview slot had been chosen by Sunak and his team from a range of options offered by ITN.

2024 United Kingdom general election Interviews in Great Britain
Date	Broadcaster	Timings	Channels		Host	Party Leader
Date	Broadcaster	Timings	TV	Digital	Host	Party Leader
6 June	ITV	20:30-21:00	ITV1; STV; UTV	ITVX; STV Player	Paul Brand	Sir Ed Davey
10 June	BBC	20:00-20:30	BBC One; BBC News	BBC iPlayer	Nick Robinson	Rishi Sunak
12 June	BBC	19:00-19:30	BBC One; BBC News	BBC iPlayer	Nick Robinson	John Swinney
12 June	ITV	19:00-19:30	ITV1; STV; UTV	ITVX; STV Player	Paul Brand	Rishi Sunak
14 June	BBC	19:30-20:00	BBC One; BBC News	BBC iPlayer	Nick Robinson	Keir Starmer
21 June	BBC	19:00-19:30	BBC One	BBC iPlayer	Nick Robinson	Nigel Farage
21 June	BBC	20:30-21:00	BBC News	BBC iPlayer	Nick Robinson	Nigel Farage
24 June	BBC	19:00-19:30	BBC One	BBC iPlayer	Nick Robinson	Adrian Ramsay
24 June	BBC	20:30-21:00	BBC News	BBC iPlayer	Nick Robinson	Adrian Ramsay
27 June	ITV	20:30-21:00	ITV1; STV; UTV	ITVX; STV Player	Paul Brand	Keir Starmer
28 June	BBC	19:30-20:00	BBC One; BBC News	BBC iPlayer	Nick Robinson	Sir Ed Davey

== Endorsements ==
Newspapers, organisations, and individuals endorsed parties or individual candidates for the election.

== Candidates ==
There were 4,515 candidates standing, which constitutes a record number, with a mean of 6.95 candidates per constituency. No seat had fewer than five people contesting it; Rishi Sunak's Richmond and Northallerton seat had the most candidates, with thirteen.

MPs who stood down at the election included the former prime minister Theresa May, the former cabinet ministers Sajid Javid, Dominic Raab, Matt Hancock, Ben Wallace, Nadhim Zahawi, Kwasi Kwarteng, and Michael Gove, the long-serving Labour MPs Harriet Harman and Margaret Beckett, and the former Green Party leader and co-leader Caroline Lucas, who was the first – and until this election the only – Green Party MP.

In March 2022, Labour abandoned all-women shortlists, citing legal advice that continuing to use them for choosing parliamentary candidates would be an unlawful practice under the Equality Act 2010, since the majority of Labour MPs were now women.

In March 2024, Reform UK announced an electoral pact with the Northern Irish unionist party TUV. The TUV applied to run candidates as "TUV/Reform UK" on ballot papers, but this was rejected by the Electoral Office. Nigel Farage unilaterally ended this deal by endorsing two competing candidates from the Democratic Unionist Party on 10 June. Reform UK also announced a pact with the Social Democratic Party (SDP), a minor socially conservative and economically left-wing party, in some seats.

All parties standing in at least 14 seats
Parties	Candidates
Conservative Party	635
Labour Party	631
Liberal Democrats	630
Reform UK	609
Green Party of England and Wales	574
Workers Party of Britain	152
Social Democratic Party	122
Scottish National Party	57
Co-operative Party	48 (Note: In electoral pact with the Labour Party, all candidates are also standing for the Labour Party)
Scottish Greens	44
Heritage Party	41
Trade Unionist and Socialist Coalition	40
Plaid Cymru	32
Yorkshire Party	27
Rejoin EU	26
UKIP	24
Christian Peoples Alliance	22
Official Monster Raving Loony Party	22
Alba Party	19
Alliance Party of Northern Ireland	18
Social Democratic and Labour Party	18
Ulster Unionist Party	17
Democratic Unionist Party	16
Party of Women	16
Scottish Family Party	16
Communist Party of Britain	14
Sinn Féin	14
Traditional Unionist Voice	14

There were additionally:

- 37 other parties with more than one candidate standing,
- 36 candidates who were the sole representatives of their party,
- 459 independent candidates,
- the Speaker.

== Opinion polling ==
Discussion around the campaign was focused on the prospect of a change in government, as Labour maintained significant leads in opinion polling over the Conservatives, with one in five voters voting tactically. Projections four weeks before the vote indicated a landslide victory for Labour that surpassed the one achieved by Tony Blair at the 1997 general election, while comparisons were made in the media to the 1993 Canadian federal election due to the prospect of a potential Conservative wipeout. A YouGov poll conducted four weeks before the vote suggested that Labour was on course for the party's biggest election victory in history, beating Blair's 1997 landslide. The poll indicated Labour could win 422 seats, while the Conservatives were projected to win 140 seats.

Halfway through the campaign, psephologist John Curtice summarised the polls as having shown little change in the first two weeks of the campaign but that they had then shown some clear shifts. Specifically, both the Conservatives and Labour had shown a decline of a few percentage points, leaving the gap between them unchanged, while Reform UK and the Liberal Democrats had both shown an increase, with one YouGov poll published 13 June attracting attention for showing Reform UK one point above the Conservatives.

=== Graphical summaries ===
The Conservatives led the polls for the two years following the 2019 general election, which included Brexit, the onset of the COVID-19 pandemic and vaccine rollout during the leadership of Boris Johnson. Labour took a lead following the Partygate scandal and maintained this through the Liz Truss and Rishi Sunak premierships until the 2024 election.

=== Projections ===
Others figures include, importantly, the Speaker and all political parties in Northern Ireland, unless otherwise stated.

==== Four weeks before the vote ====
Source	Date								Others	Result
Source	Date	Con.	Lab.	LD	SNP	PC	Green	Ref.	Others	Result
The Economist (Note: These values are medians of a series of simulations, and so do not add together.)	7 June	182	394	22	24	2	1	0	19	Labour majority 138
Electoral Calculus	7 June	75	474	61	16	3	2	0	19	Labour majority 298
ElectionMapsUK	10 June	101	451	59	13	4	2	1	19	Labour majority 252
Financial Times	7 June	139	443	32	14	2	1	0	19	Labour majority 236
New Statesman	7 June	86	455	65	20	3	1	1	19	Labour majority 260
YouGov	3 June	140	422	48	17	2	2	0	19	Labour majority 194

==== Two weeks before the vote ====
Source	Date								Others	Result
Source	Date	Con.	Lab.	LD	SNP	PC	Green	Ref.	Others	Result
The Economist	20 June	184	383	23	28	2	1	0	19 (Note: This figure includes the Speaker as well as the 18 seats in Northern Ireland.)	Labour majority 116
Electoral Calculus	21 June	76	457 (Note: This figure includes the Speaker.)	66	22	4	2	3	2	Labour majority 264
Financial Times	19 June	97	459	51	21	2	1	0	19	Labour majority 268
The New Statesman	20 June	101	437	63	22	3	1	4	19	Labour majority 224
YouGov	19 June	108	425	67	20	4	2	5	0	Labour majority 198
Ipsos	18 June	115	453	38	15	4	3	3	1	Labour majority 256
Savanta	19 June	53	516	50	8	4	1	0	0	Labour majority 380
The New Statesman	22 June	96	435	63	24	3	4	6	1	Labour majority 238

==== One week before the vote ====
Source	Date								Others	Result
Source	Date	Con.	Lab.	LD	SNP	PC	Green	Ref.	Others	Result
The Economist	27 June	117	429	42	23	3	1	2	19	Labour majority 208
Electoral Calculus	26 June	60	450	71	24	4	4	18	19 (Note: This figure includes the 18 seats in Northern Ireland.)	Labour majority 250
Financial Times	28 June	91	459	64	13	2	1	1	19	Labour majority 268
ElectionMapsUK	27 June	80	453	71	17	4	4	2	19	Labour majority 256
The New Statesman	29 June	90	436	68	23	3	4	7	19	Labour majority 222
ElectionMapsUK	1 July	81	453	69	17	4	4	3	19	Labour majority 256

==== Final projections ====
Source	Date								Others	Result
Source	Date	Con.	Lab.	LD	SNP	PC	Green	Ref.	Others	Result
Survation	2 July	64	483	61	10	3	3	7	19	Labour majority 316
More in Common	3 July	126	430	52	16	2	1	2	21	Labour majority 210
The Economist	3 July	109	432	48	21	3	1	2	19	Labour majority 214
Financial Times	3 July	98	447	63	19	2	1	1	19	Labour majority 244
YouGov	3 July	102	431	72	18	3	2	3	19	Labour majority 212
New Statesman	3 July	114	418	63	23	3	4	6	19	Labour majority 186
Election Maps UK	4 July	101	432	68	19	4	4	3	19	Labour majority 214
Electoral Calculus	4 July	78	453	67	19	3	3	7	20	Labour majority 256
Bunker Consulting Group	1 July	130	425	43	26	4	2	1	19	Labour majority 200

=== Exit poll ===
An exit poll conducted by Ipsos for the BBC, ITV, and Sky News was published at the end of voting at 22:00, predicting the number of seats for each party.

Parties	Seats	Difference
Labour Party	410	▲209
Conservative Party	131	▼241
Liberal Democrats	61	▲53
Reform UK	13	▲13
Scottish National Party	10	▼38
Plaid Cymru	4	▲2
Green Party	2	▲1
Others	19	▲1
Labour majority of 170		

=== BBC projection ===
At about 4 am on 5 July, the BBC released a new projection, combining the exit poll with the results coming in.

Parties	Seats	Difference
Labour Party	405	▲204
Conservative Party	154	▼218
Liberal Democrats	56	▲48
Scottish National Party	6	▼42
Plaid Cymru	4	▲2
Reform UK	4	▲4
Green Party	2	▲1
Others	19	▲1
Labour majority of 160		

== Results ==
Voting closed at 22:00, which was followed by an exit poll. The first seat, Houghton and Sunderland South, was declared at 23:15 with Bridget Phillipson winning for Labour. Inverness, Skye and West Ross-shire was the last seat to declare, due to multiple recounts after the election, with Angus MacDonald winning for the Liberal Democrats on the afternoon of 6 July. Notably, the 2024 election was the most unrepresentative in UK history, with Labour receiving the lowest percentage of the popular vote for a governing party in any general election since record-keeping of the popular vote began in 1830.

=== Summary of seats returned ===
Affiliate	Leader	MPs		Aggregate votes	
Affiliate	Leader		Of total		Of total
Labour Party	Keir Starmer	411 (Note: Includes 43 MPs sponsored by the Co-operative Party, who are designated Labour and Co-operative.)	63.2%	9,708,716	33.7%
Conservative Party	Rishi Sunak	121	18.6%	6,828,925	23.7%
Liberal Democrats	Ed Davey	72	11.1%	3,519,143	12.2%
Scottish National Party	John Swinney	9	1.4%	724,758	2.5%
Sinn Féin	Mary Lou McDonald	7	1.1%	210,891	0.7%
Independent	—N/a	6	0.9%	564,243	2.0%
Reform UK	Nigel Farage	5	0.8%	4,117,610	14.3%
Democratic Unionist Party	Gavin Robinson	5	0.8%	172,058	0.6%
Green Party of England and Wales	Carla Denyer; Adrian Ramsay	4	0.6%	1,841,888	6.4%
Plaid Cymru	Rhun ap Iorwerth	4	0.6%	194,811	0.7%
Social Democratic and Labour Party	Colum Eastwood	2	0.3%	86,861	0.3%
Alliance Party of Northern Ireland	Naomi Long	1	0.2%	117,191	0.4%
Ulster Unionist Party	Doug Beattie	1	0.2%	94,779	0.3%
Traditional Unionist Voice	Jim Allister	1	0.2%	48,685	0.2%
Speaker	Lindsay Hoyle	1	0.2%	25,238	0.1%

=== Full results ===
Results of the July 2024 general election to the House of Commons of the United Kingdom
Affiliate	Leader	Candidates	MPs					Aggregate votes		
Affiliate	Leader	Candidates	Total	Gained (Note: Notional gains and loses in accordance with Thrasher and Railings calculations)	Lost	Net	Of total (%)	Total	Of total (%)	Change (%)
Labour	Keir Starmer	631 (Note: Includes 44 Co-operative Party candidates, as part of the Labour-Co-op alliance)	411 (Note: Includes 43 Co-operative Party MPs, as part of the Labour-Co-op alliance)	218 (Note: Includes 17 Co-operative Party MPs, as part of the Labour-Co-op alliance)	7	▲211 (Note: Includes ▲17 Co-operative Party MPs, as part of the Labour-Co-op alliance)	63.2 (Note: Includes 6.6% for the Co-operative Party, as part of the Labour-Co-op alliance)	9,708,716 (Note: Includes 805,340 for the Co-operative Party, as part of the Labour-Co-op alliance)	33.70 (Note: Includes 2.78% for the Co-operative Party, as part of the Labour-Co-op alliance)	▲1.6 (Note: Includes ▼0.4% for the Co-operative Party, as part of the Labour-Co-op alliance)
Conservative	Rishi Sunak	635	121	1	252	▼251	18.6	6,828,925	23.70	▼19.9
Reform	Nigel Farage	609	5	5	0	▲5	0.8	4,117,620	14.29	▲12.3
Liberal Democrats	Ed Davey	630	72	64	0	▲64	11.1	3,519,143	12.22	▲0.7
Green Party of England and Wales	Carla Denyer & Adrian Ramsay	574	4	3	0	▲3	0.6	1,841,888	6.39	▲3.8
Scottish National Party	John Swinney	57	9	1	40	▼39	1.4	724,758	2.52	▼1.3
Independents	—N/a	459	6	6	0	▲6	0.9	564,243	1.96	▲1.4
Sinn Féin	Mary Lou McDonald	14	7	0	0	Steady	1.1	210,891	0.73	▲0.1
Workers Party	George Galloway	152	0	New			0.0	210,194	0.73	New
Plaid Cymru	Rhun ap Iorwerth	32	4	2	0	▲2	0.6	194,811	0.68	▲0.2
Democratic Unionist	Gavin Robinson	16	5	0	3	▼3	0.8	172,058	0.60	▼0.2
Alliance	Naomi Long	18	1	1	1	Steady	0.2	117,191	0.41	Steady
Ulster Unionist	Doug Beattie	17	1	1	0	▲1	0.2	94,779	0.33	Steady
Scottish Greens	Patrick Harvie & Lorna Slater	44	0	0	0	Steady	0.0	92,685	0.32	▲0.2
Social Democratic & Labour	Colum Eastwood	18	2	0	0	Steady	0.3	86,861	0.30	▼0.1
Traditional Unionist Voice	Jim Allister	14	1	Did not stand in 2019			0.1	48,685	0.17	—N/a
Social Democratic Party	William Clouston	122	0	0	0	Steady	0.0	33,811	0.12	▲0.1
Speaker (Note: Incumbent Speaker Sir Lindsay Hoyle left the Labour Party in 2019 after he was elected Speaker by the House of Commons; his seat of Chorley was not contested by most major parties.)	Lindsay Hoyle	1	1	0	0	Steady	0.1	25,238	0.09	Steady
Yorkshire Party	Bob Buxton & Simon Biltcliffe	27	0	0	0	Steady	0.0	17,227	0.06	Steady
Independent Network	Marianne Overton	5	0	Did not stand in 2019			0.0	13,663	0.05	—N/a
Trade Unionist & Socialist	Dave Nellist	40	0	Did not stand in 2019			0.0	12,562	0.04	—N/a
Alba	Alex Salmond	19	0	New			0.0	11,784	0.04	New
Rejoin EU	Brendan Donnelly	26	0	New			0.0	9,245	0.03	New
Green Party (NI)	Mal O'Hara	11	0	0	0	Steady	0.0	8,692	0.03	Steady
People Before Profit	Collective leadership (Note: Eamonn McCann is listed as the party's leader in Northern Ireland for the purposes of registration to the UK Electoral Commission. Electoral Commission registration)	3	0	0	0	Steady	0.0	8,438	0.03	Steady
Aontú	Peadar Tóibín	10	0	0	0	Steady	0.0	7,466	0.03	Steady
Newham Independents Party	Mehmood Mirza	1	0	New			0.0	7,180	0.02	New
Heritage Party	David Kurten	41	0	New			0.0	6,597	0.02	New
UK Independence Party	Nick Tenconi (interim)	24	0	0	0	Steady	0.0	6,530	0.02	▼0.1
Liberal Party	Steve Radford	12	0	0	0	Steady	0.0	6,375	0.02	Steady
Ashfield Independents	Jason Zadrozny	1	0	0	0	Steady	0.0	6,276	0.02	Steady
Monster Raving Loony	Howling Laud Hope	22	0	0	0	Steady	0.0	5,814	0.02	Steady
Christian Peoples Alliance	Sidney Cordle	22	0	0	0	Steady	0.0	5,604	0.02	Steady
Scottish Family	Richard Lucas	16	0	0	0	Steady	0.0	5,425	0.02	Steady
English Democrats	Robin Tilbrook	15	0	0	0	Steady	0.0	5,182	0.02	Steady
Party of Women	Kellie-Jay Keen	16	0	New			0.0	5,077	0.02	New
Lincolnshire Independents	Marianne Overton	2	0	0	0	Steady	0.0	4,277	0.01	Steady
One Leicester	Rita Patel	2	0	New			0.0	4,008	0.01	New
Socialist Labour Party	Jim McDaid	12	0	0	0	Steady	0.0	3,609	0.01	Steady
Liverpool Community Independents	Alan Gibbons	1	0	New			0.0	3,293	0.01	New
Swale Independents	Mike Baldock	1	0	Did not stand in 2019			0.0	3,238	0.01	—N/a
Hampshire Independents	Alan Stone	10	0	New			0.0	2,872	0.01	New
Communist Party of Britain	Robert Griffiths	14	0	Did not stand in 2019			0.0	2,622	0.01	—N/a
Democracy for Chorley	Ben Holden-Crowther	1	0	New			0.0	2,424	0.01	New
Independent Oxford Alliance	Anne Gwinett	1	0	New			0.0	2,381	0.01	New
Climate Party	Edmund Gemmell	13	0	New			0.0	1,967	0.01	New
South Devon Alliance	Richard Daws	1	0	New			0.0	1,924	0.01	New
British Democratic Party	James Lewthwaite	4	0	Did not stand in 2019			0.0	1,860	0.01	—N/a
True and Fair Party	Gina Miller	4	0	Did not stand in 2019			0.0	1,695	0.01	—N/a
Alliance for Democracy and Freedom	Teck Khong	9	0	New			0.0	1,586	0.01	New
North East Party	Brian Moore	1	0	0	0	Steady	0.0	1,581	0.01	Steady
English Constitution Party	Graham Moore	4	0	New			0.0	1,563	0.01	New
Abolish the Welsh Assembly Party	Richard Suchorzewski	3	0	Did not stand in 2019			0.0	1,521	0.01	—N/a
Animal Welfare Party	Vanessa Hudson	4	0	0	0	Steady	0.0	1,486	0.01	Steady
Consensus	Ian Berkeley-Hurst	1	0	New			0.0	1,289	0.00	New
Women's Equality Party	Mandu Reid	4	0	0	0	Steady	0.0	1,275	0.00	Steady
Workers Revolutionary Party	Joshua Ogunleye	5	0	0	0	Steady	0.0	1,190	0.00	Steady
Kingston Independent Residents Group	Yvonne Tracey	1	0	New			0.0	1,177	0.00	New
Propel	Neil McEvoy	1	0	New			0.0	1,041	0.00	New
Scottish Socialist Party	Colin Fox & Natalie Reid	2	0	Did not stand in 2019			0.0	1,007	0.00	—N/a
Independent Alliance (Kent)	Francis Michael Taylor	1	0	New			0.0	926	0.00	New
Freedom Alliance	Catherine Evans	5	0	New			0.0	895	0.00	New
Christian Party	Jeff Green	2	0	Coalition with CPA in 2019			0.0	806	0.00	—N/a
Confelicity	James Miller	2	0	New			0.0	750	0.00	New
Portsmouth Independents Party	Brian Moore	1	0	New			0.0	733	0.00	New
Independence for Scotland Party	Colette Walker	2	0	New			0.0	678	0.00	New
Shared Ground	Thomas Hall	2	0	New			0.0	664	0.00	New
Cross-Community Labour Alternative	Owen McCracken	1	0	Did not stand in 2019			0.0	624	0.00	—N/a
British Unionist Party	John Ferguson	2	0	New			0.0	614	0.00	New
Transform	Anwarul Khan	2	0	New			0.0	595	0.00	New
Putting Crewe First	Brian Silvester	1	0	New			0.0	588	0.00	New
Scottish Libertarian Party	Tam Laird	4	0	0	0	Steady	0.0	536	0.00	Steady
Peace Party	John Morris	2	0	0	0	Steady	0.0	531	0.00	Steady
Taking the Initiative Party	Nicola Zingwari	1	0	Did not stand in 2019			0.0	503	0.00	—N/a
Parties with fewer than 500 votes each		51	0	N/A			0.0	5,719	0.02	N/A
Blank and invalid votes								116,063	—	—
Total		4,515	650			0	100.0	28,809,340	100.00	0.0
Registered voters, and turnout								48,224,212	59.74	−7.78

=== By nation and region ===
Seats by nations and regions
Nation/region	Seats										
Nation/region	Seats	Lab.	Con.	Lib. Dems	SNP	Ref.	Green	PC	SF	DUP	Others
East of England	61	27	23	7	—N/a	3	1	—N/a	—N/a	—N/a	0
East Midlands	47	29	15	0	—N/a	2	0	—N/a	—N/a	—N/a	1
London	75	59	9	6	—N/a	0	0	—N/a	—N/a	—N/a	1
North East	27	26	1	0	—N/a	0	0	—N/a	—N/a	—N/a	0
North West	73	65	3	3	—N/a	0	0	—N/a	—N/a	—N/a	2
South East	91	36	30	24	—N/a	0	1	—N/a	—N/a	—N/a	0
South West	58	24	11	22	—N/a	0	1	—N/a	—N/a	—N/a	0
West Midlands	57	38	15	2	—N/a	0	1	—N/a	—N/a	—N/a	1
Yorkshire and the Humber	54	43	9	1	—N/a	0	0	—N/a	—N/a	—N/a	1
Scotland	57	37	5	6	9	0	—N/a	—N/a	—N/a	—N/a	0
Wales	32	27	0	1	—N/a	0	0	4	—N/a	—N/a	0
Northern Ireland	18	—N/a	0	—N/a	—N/a	—N/a	—N/a	—N/a	7	5	6
Total	650	411	121	72	9	5	4	4	7	5	12

Equal-area projection of constituencies

Runners up in each constituency

The result was a landslide win for Labour and a historic loss for the Conservatives. It was the latter's worst result since formalising as a party in the early 19th century, and the largest defeat for any incarnation of the Tories in purely numeric terms since 1761 when they achieved 112 MPs, up from their all time numeric low of 106 in 1754, although those made up a higher percentage of seats in Parliament (18.9% in 1754 and 20.1% in 1761 as opposed to 18.6% in 2024) due to the smaller sized House of Commons in 1754–1761 of 557 MPs. The Conservatives won no seats in Wales or various English counties, including Cornwall and Oxfordshire (the latter historically known for having several safe Conservative seats), and they only won one seat in North East England. Keir Starmer became the fourth prime minister in a two-year period. Turnout, at 59.9%, was the second lowest since records began in 1885 with only 2001 being lower at 59.4%.

The Liberal Democrats made significant gains to reach their highest ever number of seats, mostly gaining Conservative seats in Southern England. This was also the best performance since its predecessor Liberal Party won 158 seats, in third place, in 1923 (itself a higher score than the second-placed Conservatives achieved in this 2024 election) and superior to Labour's 1918 and 1931 performances, as second-placed official Opposition on both occasions. The Co-operative Party, which is in an electoral pact with the Labour Party, and whose MPs are designated as Labour Co-op, also had its best ever result. It elected 43 MPs, surpassing its previous record of 38 seats in the 2017 election. These MPs are typically included in the overall Labour total. Reform UK had MPs elected to the Commons for the first time. Their leader, Nigel Farage, was elected to Parliament on what was his eighth attempt. The Green Party of England and Wales also won a record number of seats. The party's two co-leaders, Carla Denyer and Adrian Ramsay, both entered Parliament for the first time.

The Scottish National Party (SNP) lost around three quarters of its seats to Scottish Labour. Labour returned to being the largest party in Scotland and remained so in Wales, although their vote share fell in Wales.

Because the Democratic Unionist Party lost 3 seats, Sinn Féin won the most seats in Northern Ireland, making it the first time an Irish nationalist party was the largest party in Parliament from Northern Ireland. The Traditional Unionist Voice entered the Commons for the first time. In North Down, independent Unionist candidate Alex Easton emerged victorious over the Alliance Party incumbent Stephen Farry, resulting in the election of a total of six independent MPs across the UK.

Four independent candidates (Ayoub Khan, Adnan Hussain, Iqbal Mohamed, Shockat Adam) outright defeated Labour candidates as well as one (Claudia Webbe) acting as a spoiler to defeat one in areas with large Muslim populations; the results were suggested to be a push-back against Labour's stance on the Gaza war and the humanitarian crisis. Additionally, Wes Streeting retained his Ilford North constituency by a margin of only 528 votes following a challenge by independent British-Palestinian candidate Leanne Mohamad, while prominent Labour MP Jess Phillips retained her Birmingham Yardley constituency by a margin of 693 votes. Labour candidate Paul Waugh won the seat of Rochdale from incumbent MP George Galloway, despite the constituency's sizeable Muslim population. In Islington North, Jeremy Corbyn defeated the Labour candidate with a majority of 7,247; Corbyn is a prominent activist for Palestinian solidarity. In September 2024, Corbyn went on to form the Independent Alliance group in parliament with four of the other five elected independent MPs.

=== Proportionality concerns ===
Seats won in the election (outer ring) versus number of votes (inner ring)

The election was highly disproportionate, as Labour won 63% of seats (411) with only 33.7% of the vote, making this the lowest vote share for any governing party since record-keeping of the popular vote began in 1830, while Reform won under 0.8% of seats (5) with 14.3% of the vote under the UK's first-past-the-post voting system. The combined vote share for Labour and the Conservatives reached a record low, with smaller parties doing well. The Liberal Democrats recorded their best ever seat result (72), despite receiving only around half the votes they did in 2010, and fewer votes overall than Reform, although the party's seat share was again lower than its share of the vote. As Starmer's government was elected with the lowest share of the vote of any majority party on record, journalist Fraser Nelson described Labour's electoral success as a "Potemkin landslide". An editorial from The Guardian described the result as a "crisis of electoral legitimacy" for the incoming Labour government.

The Gallagher index gave the election a 23.67 score, making it the least proportionate election in modern UK history according to the index, as well as the 5th least proportional result worldwide as of 2024. According to political scientist John Curtice, the 2024 election was the most disproportional in British history and Labour's parliamentary majority was "heavily exaggerated" by the voting system. Advocacy group Make Votes Matter found that 58% of voters did not vote for their elected MP. Make Votes Matter spokesman Steve Gilmore, Electoral Reform Society chief Darren Hughes, Reform UK leader Nigel Farage and the Green Party of England and Wales co-leader Adrian Ramsay were among the figures that called for electoral reform in the wake of the election. The campaigners said it was the "most disproportionate election in [British] history".

Relation of votes and seats
Affiliation	Aggregate votes	Seats	Aggregate votes per seat	Seats per aggregate vote
Total	28,805,931	650	44,317	2.256×10^{−5}
For any returned candidate	12,151,835	650	18,695	5.349×10^{−5}
Labour	9,731,363	411	23,620	4.223×10^{−5}
Conservative	6,827,112	121	56,422	1.772×10^{−5}
Liberal Democrat	3,519,163	72	48,877	2.046×10^{−5}
Scottish National Party	724,758	9	80,529	1.242×10^{−5}
Sinn Féin	210,891	7	30,127	3.319×10^{−5}
Others	842,013	7	120,288	8.31×10^{−6}
Reform UK	4,106,661	5	821,332	1.22×10^{−6}
Democratic Unionist Party	172,058	5	34,412	2.906×10^{−5}
Green	1,943,258	4	485,815	2.06×10^{−6}
Plaid Cymru	194,811	4	48,703	2.053×10^{−5}
Social Democratic and Labour Party	86,861	2	43,431	2.303×10^{−5}
Alliance	117,191	1	117,191	8.53×10^{−6}
Ulster Unionist Party	94,779	1	94,779	1.055×10^{−5}
Workers Party of Britain	210,194	0	—N/a	0
Alba	11,784	0	—N/a	0

=== Marginality ===
The election resulted in more widespread marginality, with 31% of seats won on margins up to 10% compared with 22% in the 2019 election. The average seat majority fell from 26% in 2019 to 16% in 2024.

=== Voter demographics ===
==== YouGov ====
Below is listed YouGov's demographic breakdown.

Breakdown of vote in Great Britain into affiliates (%) by demographic
Category	Lab.	Con.	Ref.	LD	Grn	SNP	Others	Margin
All	35	24	15	13	7	3	4	11
Gender
Female	35	26	12	13	8	2	4	9
Male	34	23	17	12	6	3	5	11
Age
18–24	41	8	9	16	18	3	5	23
25–49	44	14	12	14	9	2	5	30
50–64	32	26	19	11	5	3	5	6
65+	22	42	16	11	3	2	4	20
Women by age
18–24	42	6	6	16	23	3	3	19
25–49	45	15	10	14	10	2	5	30
50–64	32	29	16	11	5	3	4	3
65+	23	42	13	12	3	2	4	19
Men by age
18–24	40	10	12	16	12	3	7	24
25–49	43	14	15	13	8	3	4	28
50–64	32	23	22	11	5	3	5	9
65+	21	41	16	11	5	3	4	20
Social class (summary)
ABC1	36	25	11	14	7	2	4	11
C2DE	33	23	20	11	6	3	5	10
Social class (all)
AB	36	27	10	15	7	2	4	9
C1	36	23	13	13	8	3	4	13
C2	32	24	20	11	6	3	5	8
DE	34	23	19	10	6	3	5	11
Highest educational level
Low	28	31	23	9	4	2	4	3
Medium	32	26	16	12	7	3	5	6
High	42	18	8	15	9	3	5	24
Household earnings
Less than £20,000	33	24	17	11	8	3	5	9
£20,000–29,999	32	26	17	11	6	3	5	6
£30,000–49,999	34	25	15	12	7	3	5	11
£50,000–69,999	40	20	14	13	7	3	3	20
£70,000+	40	22	10	16	6	2	4	18
Household tenure
Own outright	25	37	16	12	4	2	4	12
Mortgage	39	21	14	13	6	2	4	18
Private rent	42	12	13	14	12	2	5	28
Social rent	42	14	21	9	7	4	4	21
Rent-free	40	15	11	14	12	3	5	25
By affiliation of vote in 2019 general election
Conservative	10	53	25	7	2	0	3	28
Labour	71	2	3	8	10	1	5	61
Lib. Dems	30	10	2	49	5	0	2	19
SNP	22	1	3	4	5	60	4	38
Brexit Party	8	9	69	4	3	0	7	60
Green	28	7	7	14	36	2	7	8

==== Ipsos ====
Below is listed Ipsos's demographic breakdown.

Breakdown of vote in Great Britain into affiliates (%) by demographic
Category	Lab.	Con.	Ref.	LD	Grn	SNP/PC	Others	Margin
All	35	24	15	13	7	4	3	11
Gender
Female	35	26	13	13	7	4	3	9
Male	34	23	17	12	7	4	3	11
Age
18–24	41	5	8	16	20	5	5	21
25–34	47	10	13	11	12	3	4	34
35–44	41	17	14	13	7	3	5	24
45–54	36	22	17	14	6	2	3	14
55–64	32	27	19	12	4	3	3	5
65+	23	43	14	12	2	4	1	20
Women by age
18–24	45	5	7	16	17	3	6	28
25–34	47	9	7	16	17	3	6	30
35–54	39	19	14	13	8	3	4	20
55+	26	40	13	13	3	4	2	14
Men by age
18–24	36	4	9	16	21	8	5	15
25–34	47	10	14	10	12	3	4	33
35–54	38	20	17	13	5	3	4	18
55+	27	35	20	11	3	3	2	8
Social class
AB	36	26	9	17	7	2	2	10
C1	36	25	12	13	8	2	3	11
C2	31	25	25	10	5	4	2	6
DE	32	26	17	10	5	5	4	11
Highest educational level
No qualifications	28	39	18	4	3	6	2	11
Other qualifications	30	32	13	13	4	3	5	2
Degree or higher	43	19	7	16	9	3	3	24
Household tenure
Own outright	27	37	15	12	4	4	2	10
Mortgage	38	21	14	14	8	2	3	17
Private rent	40	14	12	12	12	5	4	39
Social rent	43	12	20	9	8	4	4	23
Ethnic group
White	33	26	16	13	6	4	2	7
All ethnic minorities	46	17	3	8	11	1	13	29
Asian	39	18	3	8	11	1	20	19
Black	68	16	1	6	8	1	1	52
Mixed	50	14	7	11	13	3	2	36
By vote in EU referendum
Remain	46	18	3	17	8	5	3	28
Leave	19	38	29	7	3	2	2	9
Did not vote	40	18	16	11	7	5	4	22
By affiliation of vote in 2019 general election
Conservative	12	53	24	7	2	0	2	29
Labour	71	2	4	9	9	1	5	62
Lib. Dems	31	8	3	49	7	1	1	18

== Seats changing parties ==
Based on the notional results.

Conservative to Labour (182)

- Aldershot
- Altrincham and Sale West
- Amber Valley
- Ashford
- Aylesbury
- Banbury
- Bangor Aberconwy
- Barrow and Furness
- Basingstoke
- Bassetlaw
- Bexleyheath and Crayford
- Birmingham Northfield
- Bishop Auckland
- Blackpool North and Fleetwood
- Blackpool South
- Bolsover
- Bolton North East
- Bolton West
- Bournemouth East
- Bournemouth West
- Bracknell
- Bridgend
- Broxtowe
- Buckingham and Bletchley
- Burnley
- Burton and Uttoxeter
- Bury North
- Bury South
- Bury St Edmunds and Stowmarket
- Calder Valley
- Camborne and Redruth
- Cannock Chase
- Carlisle
- Chatham and Aylesford
- Chelsea and Fulham
- Chipping Barnet
- Cities of London and Westminster
- Clwyd East
- Clwyd North
- Colchester
- Colne Valley
- Congleton
- Corby and East Northamptonshire
- Crawley
- Crewe and Nantwich
- Darlington
- Dartford
- Derby North
- Derbyshire Dales
- Doncaster East and the Isle of Axholme
- Dover and Deal
- Dudley
- Dunstable and Leighton Buzzard
- Earley and Woodley
- East Thanet
- East Worthing and Shoreham
- Eltham and Chislehurst
- Erewash
- Filton and Bradley Stoke
- Finchley and Golders Green
- Folkestone and Hythe
- Forest of Dean
- Gedling
- Gillingham and Rainham
- Gloucester
- Gravesham
- Great Grimsby and Cleethorpes
- Halesowen
- Harlow
- Hastings and Rye
- Hemel Hempstead
- Hendon
- Hertford and Stortford
- Hexham
- High Peak
- Hitchin
- Hyndburn
- Ipswich
- Isle of Wight West
- Kettering
- Kingston upon Hull West and Haltemprice
- Lancaster and Wyre
- Leeds North West
- Leeds South West and Morley
- Leigh and Atherton
- Lichfield
- Lincoln
- Loughborough
- Lowestoft
- Macclesfield
- Mansfield
- Mid and South Pembrokeshire
- Mid Cheshire
- Mid Derbyshire
- Middlesbrough South and East Cleveland
- Milton Keynes Central
- Milton Keynes North
- Monmouthshire
- Montgomeryshire and Glyndŵr
- Morecambe and Lunesdale
- Newcastle-under-Lyme
- Newton Aycliffe and Spennymoor
- North East Derbyshire
- North East Hertfordshire
- North East Somerset and Hanham
- North Northumberland
- North Somerset
- North Warwickshire and Bedworth
- North West Cambridgeshire
- North West Leicestershire
- Northampton North
- Northampton South
- Norwich North
- Nuneaton
- Ossett and Denby Dale
- Pendle and Clitheroe
- Penistone and Stocksbridge
- Penrith and Solway
- Peterborough
- Plymouth Moor View
- Poole
- Portsmouth North
- Reading West and Mid Berkshire
- Redcar
- Redditch
- Ribble Valley
- Rochester and Strood
- Rossendale and Darwen
- Rother Valley
- Rugby
- Rushcliffe
- Scarborough and Whitby
- Scunthorpe
- Selby
- Sherwood Forest
- Shipley
- Shrewsbury
- Sittingbourne and Sheppey
- South Derbyshire
- South Dorset
- South East Cornwall
- South Norfolk
- South Ribble
- South West Norfolk
- Southampton Itchen
- Southend East and Rochford
- Southend West and Leigh
- Southport
- Spen Valley
- St Austell and Newquay
- Stafford
- Stevenage
- Stoke-on-Trent Central
- Stoke-on-Trent North
- Stoke-on-Trent South
- Stourbridge
- Stroud
- Suffolk Coastal
- Swindon North
- Swindon South
- Tamworth
- Telford
- Thurrock
- Tipton and Wednesbury
- Truro and Falmouth
- Uxbridge and South Ruislip
- Vale of Glamorgan
- Wakefield and Rothwell
- Walsall and Bloxwich
- Watford
- Wellingborough and Rushden
- Welwyn Hatfield
- West Bromwich
- Weston-super-Mare
- Whitehaven and Workington
- Wolverhampton North East
- Wolverhampton West
- Worcester
- Worthing West
- Wrexham
- Wycombe
- York Outer

Conservative to Liberal Democrats (60)

- Bicester and Woodstock
- Brecon, Radnor and Cwm Tawe
- Carshalton and Wallington
- Cheadle
- Chelmsford
- Cheltenham
- Chesham and Amersham
- Chichester
- Chippenham
- Didcot and Wantage
- Dorking and Horley
- Eastbourne
- Eastleigh
- Ely and East Cambridgeshire
- Epsom and Ewell
- Esher and Walton
- Frome and East Somerset
- Glastonbury and Somerton
- Guildford
- Harpenden and Berkhamsted
- Harrogate and Knaresborough
- Hazel Grove
- Henley and Thame
- Honiton and Sidmouth
- Horsham
- Lewes
- Maidenhead
- Melksham and Devizes
- Mid Dorset and North Poole
- Mid Sussex
- Newbury
- Newton Abbot
- North Cornwall
- North Devon
- North East Hampshire
- North Norfolk
- North Shropshire
- South Cambridgeshire
- South Cotswolds
- South Devon
- St Ives
- St Neots and Mid Cambridgeshire
- Stratford-on-Avon
- Surrey Heath
- Sutton and Cheam
- Taunton and Wellington
- Tewkesbury
- Thornbury and Yate
- Tiverton and Minehead
- Torbay
- Tunbridge Wells
- Wells and Mendip Hills
- West Dorset
- Westmorland and Lonsdale
- Wimbledon
- Winchester
- Witney
- Woking
- Wokingham
- Yeovil

SNP to Labour (36)

- Airdrie and Shotts
- Alloa and Grangemouth
- Ayr, Carrick and Cumnock
- Bathgate and Linlithgow
- Central Ayrshire
- Coatbridge and Bellshill
- Cowdenbeath and Kirkcaldy
- Cumbernauld and Kirkintilloch
- Dunfermline and Dollar
- East Kilbride and Strathaven
- East Renfrewshire
- Edinburgh East and Musselburgh
- Edinburgh North and Leith
- Edinburgh South West
- Falkirk
- Glasgow East
- Glasgow North
- Glasgow North East
- Glasgow South
- Glasgow South West
- Glasgow West
- Glenrothes and Mid Fife
- Hamilton and Clyde Valley
- Inverclyde and Renfrewshire West
- Kilmarnock and Loudoun
- Livingston
- Lothian East
- Midlothian
- Motherwell, Wishaw and Carluke
- Na h-Eileanan an Iar
- North Ayrshire and Arran
- Paisley and Renfrewshire North
- Paisley and Renfrewshire South
- Rutherglen
- Stirling and Strathallan
- West Dunbartonshire

Conservative to Reform UK (5)

- Ashfield
- Boston and Skegness
- Clacton
- Great Yarmouth
- South Basildon and East Thurrock

Labour to Independent (5)

- Birmingham Perry Barr
- Blackburn
- Dewsbury and Batley
- Islington North
- Leicester South

SNP to Liberal Democrats (4)

- Caithness, Sutherland and Easter Ross
- Inverness, Skye and West Ross-shire
- Mid Dunbartonshire
- North East Fife

Conservative to Green (2)

- North Herefordshire
- Waveney Valley

Conservative to Plaid Cymru (2)

- Caerfyrddin
- Ynys Môn

Alliance to Independent (1)

- North Down

Conservative to SNP (1)

- Aberdeenshire North and Moray East

DUP to Alliance (1)

- Lagan Valley

DUP to TUV (1)

- North Antrim

DUP to UUP (1)

- South Antrim

Labour to Conservative (1)

- Leicester East

Labour to Green (1)

- Bristol Central

== Aftermath ==
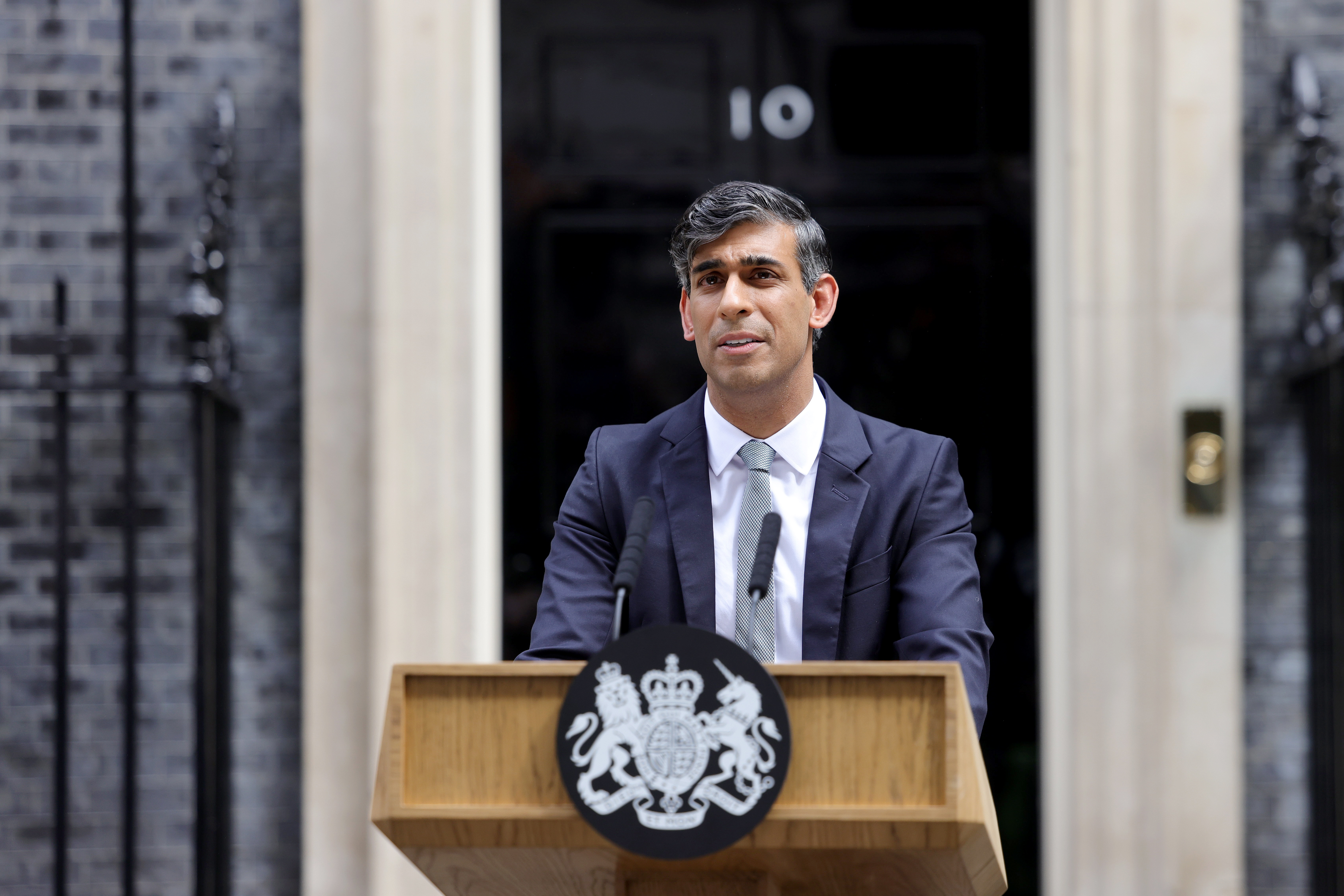
Sunak giving his final speech as Prime Minister

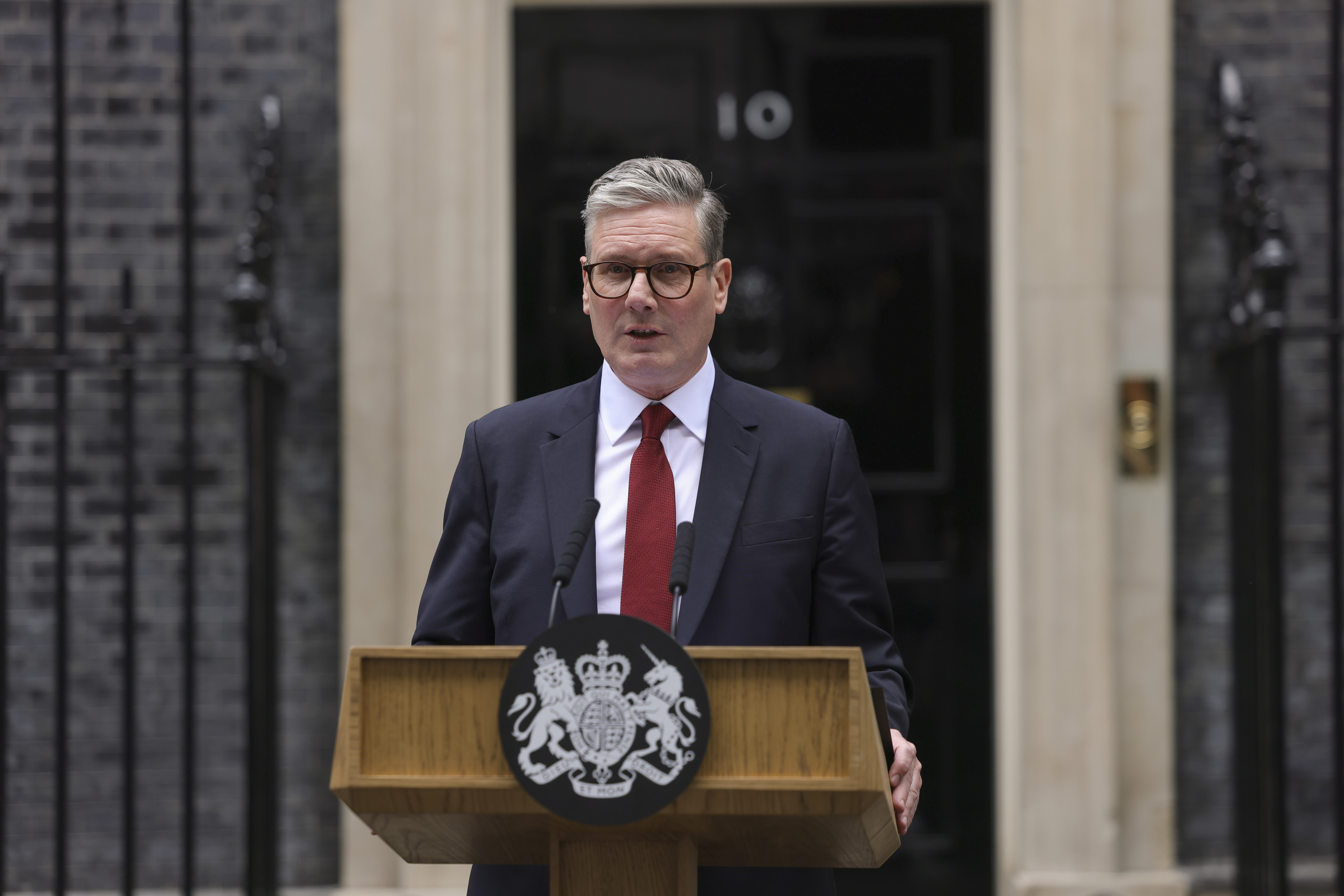
Starmer giving his first speech as Prime Minister

At around 04:45 on 5 July, Sunak conceded defeat to Starmer at the declaration at Sunak's seat of Richmond and Northallerton, before Labour had officially secured a majority. In his resignation speech later that morning, Sunak apologised to Conservative voters and candidates for the party's defeat, and offered his congratulations to Starmer and expressed hope he would be successful, saying:

Whilst he has been my political opponent, Sir Keir Starmer will shortly become our Prime Minister. In this job, his successes will be all our successes, and I wish him and his family well. Whatever our disagreements in this campaign, he is a decent, public-spirited man, who I respect. He and his family deserve the very best of our understanding, as they make the huge transition to their new lives behind this door, and as he grapples with this most demanding of jobs in an increasingly unstable world.

Starmer succeeded Sunak as prime minister, ending 14 years of the Conservatives in government. In his first speech as prime minister, Starmer paid tribute to Sunak, saying "His achievement as the first British Asian Prime Minister of our country should not be underestimated by anyone", and recognised "the dedication and hard work he brought to his leadership" but said that the people of Britain had voted for change:

From now on, you have a government unburdened by doctrine guided only by the determination to serve your interest, to defy, quietly, those who have written our country off. You have given us a clear mandate, and we will use it to deliver change. To restore service and respect to politics, end the era of noisy performance, tread more lightly on your lives and unite our country. Four nations standing together again, facing down as we have so often in our past, the challenges of an insecure world committed to a calm and patient rebuilding. So with respect and humility, I invite you all to join this government of service in the mission of national renewal. Our work is urgent, and we begin it today.

Starmer held office as Prime Minister for only 2 years, before consistently low opinion polling triggered a leadership crisis and led to his resignation following the 2026 United Kingdom local elections. Starmer was succeeded as Prime Minister by the former Mayor of Greater Manchester, Andy Burnham, in July 2026.

== See also ==
- 2020s in United Kingdom political history
- 2024 in politics
- 2024 United Kingdom general election in England
- 2024 United Kingdom general election in Northern Ireland
- 2024 United Kingdom general election in Scotland
- 2024 United Kingdom general election in Wales
- Elections in the United Kingdom
- List of United Kingdom general elections
- List of marginal seats before the 2024 United Kingdom general election
