= Hungary Guest Investor Program =

Immigrant investor program in Hungary

The Hungary Guest Investor Program (GIP) is an immigrant investor program created by the Government of Hungary to attract investments from outside the country. Under the program, foreign investors can obtain a Hungarian residence permit for 10 years by contributing at least €250,000.

== History ==
Prior to the GIP, there was another program called the Hungarian Investment Immigration program, which operated from 2012 to 2017. At that time, investors were required to purchase Hungarian bonds issued by the state through the Government Debt Management Agency worth €250,000. In return, they obtained Hungarian permanent residency. After a lock-up period of five years, participants could sell the bonds.

While the program was in force, more than 8,000 citizens obtained such residence permits in Hungary. Eventually, the scheme was suspended because of controversies.

Independent sources reported that bond payments resulted in a loss of approximately €192 million for the Hungarian budget. They also suspect that Hungarian elites personally benefited from the program since applicants invested through several offshore companies with opaque ownership structures, rather than directly.

Another reason behind suspension was its corrupted nature. Specifically, a money man of the Syrian president Bashar al-Assad, Atiya Khoury, received the Hungarian residence permit by investment in just 10 days, even after he was subjected to US sanctions.

In late 2023, the government announced a relaunch of the program. This time, the program offers not permanent residency but a temporary residence permit for 10 years. The Hungary Guest Investor Program came into force on July 1, 2024.

Holders of the residence permit are not subject to a minimum physical presence or stay requirement in Hungary. After eight years of continuous residence, permit holders may become eligible to apply for Hungarian citizenship through naturalisation, subject to a B2-level Hungarian language examination.

== Investment options ==
The GIP offers three investment options to choose from:

1. Acquisition of investment certificates worth at least €250,000, issued by a real estate fund registered with the Hungarian National Bank.
2. Purchase of residential real estate in Hungary valued at at least €500,000, which must be registered in the real estate register according to the geographic number and must be free of lawsuits, encumbrances, and claims.
3. Providing a monetary donation of at least €1 million to a higher education institution maintained by a public interest trust foundation that performs a public task for the purpose of supporting educational, scientific research, and artistic creative activities.

The residential real-estate purchase option was removed before it entered into force: a December 2024 amendment struck it from the programme days before it was due to become available on 1 January 2025, leaving the real-estate fund and the higher-education donation as the two routes.

== Eligibility ==
Foreign investors may obtain a residence permit under the GIP in Hungary if they:

- have a valid travel document;
- have proved the purpose of their entry and stay;
- enter Hungary and stay there in accordance with national economic interests, considering their investments in the country;
- have obtained a Hungary Guest Investor Visa, which grants the right to stay in Hungary for more than 90 days within 180 days, enter multiple times, and apply for a guest investor residence permit;
- have a place of accommodation or residence in the territory of Hungary;
- have the financial means to cover their stay;
- are considered to be insured for the full range of healthcare or can cover the costs of their healthcare;
- are not subject to deportation or an entry and stay ban, and their entry or stay does not threaten the public order, public safety, national security or public health interests of Hungary;
- are not subject to the Schengen Information System (SIS) alert.

Hungarian, European Union, and European Economic Area nationals are not eligible for the GIP.

The validity period of the guest investor residence permit is a maximum of ten years, which can be extended for an additional ten years only for the same purpose.

== See also ==
- Immigrant investor programs
