= Investor Program for Residence and Citizenship in Bulgaria =

The Investor Program for Residence and Citizenship in Bulgaria (also known as the Bulgarian Immigrant Investor Program) was founded in 2009 and implemented following the decisive legislation actions of the Bulgarian Government to attract foreign investment and business interest in the country. In return, investors and their families could obtain Permanent Residence Permits and become eligible for Bulgarian citizenship. This kind of program was of interest to some United States citizens as part of strategies to reduce their taxes. The program ended in 2022.
