= Continuous assessment =

Form of educational examination

Continuous assessment is a form of educational examination that evaluates a student's progress throughout a prescribed course. It is often used as an alternative to the final examination system. Proponents of continuous assessment argue that the approach allows tracking of progress and has a chance of offering students more support, guidance, and opportunities to improve during the course or programme.

== Characteristics ==
- Comprehensive
- Cumulative
- Diagnostic
- Formative
- Guidance-oriented
- Systematic in nature

== Advantages ==
Continuous assessment can help students learn in the following ways:

1. Continuous assessment can provide early indications of the performance of students.
2. An increased sense of inclusiveness: Continuous assessment provides students with a constant stream of opportunities to prove their mastery of material and sends the message that everyone can succeed if given enough time and practice. This reduces the anxiety around testing and heightens the emphasis on the learning itself.
3. Higher learning standards for all: In a system of continuous assessment, advanced students can progress through material at their own pace and remain engaged by pursuing more challenging work as they master the basics.

== Disadvantages ==
1. Greater study pressure: Unlike the final exam system, students and teachers need to focus throughout a course or programme, as all work counts towards the final grade. This may cause learners to feel more stressed. Under the final exam system, students may "cram", or study for long hours, before the test in order to get a good grade. Thus, they only have to work hard for a shorter period.
2. Risk of plagiarism: As homework and assignments become more important, students may not feel secure just showing their own knowledge. Instead, they may plagiarize other's work in order to secure a better score

== Formative assessment ==
Continuous assessment will often include some form of formative assessment. The formative assessment covers the range of informal diagnostic tests a teacher can use to assist the process of learning by their students. This may include activities such as weekly pop quizzes or preparatory assignments. Prescriptive but ungraded feedback, Instructional Research and Curriculum Evaluation, likens formative assessment to a cook tasting a soup before serving it to a guest. Despite its advantages, formative assessment can be time-consuming, and incentives in education systems tend to favor more objective assessments.

An advantage of formative assessment for learning is that it is ongoing. This allows for incremental feedback to identify problems at their earliest stages. For example, a student can correct conceptual errors before undertaking work on a term paper. As a student works on a topic, input from the teacher can inform, guide, and validate each step of the process. Cheating and plagiarism remain significant problems in academic settings. Compared to graded summative assessments like final exams, ungraded formative assessments reduce the temptation to cheat. This allows students to focus on learning instead of grades.

== See also ==
- Educational assessment
