= Immigrant investor programs =

Providing residence or citizenship in exchange for investment

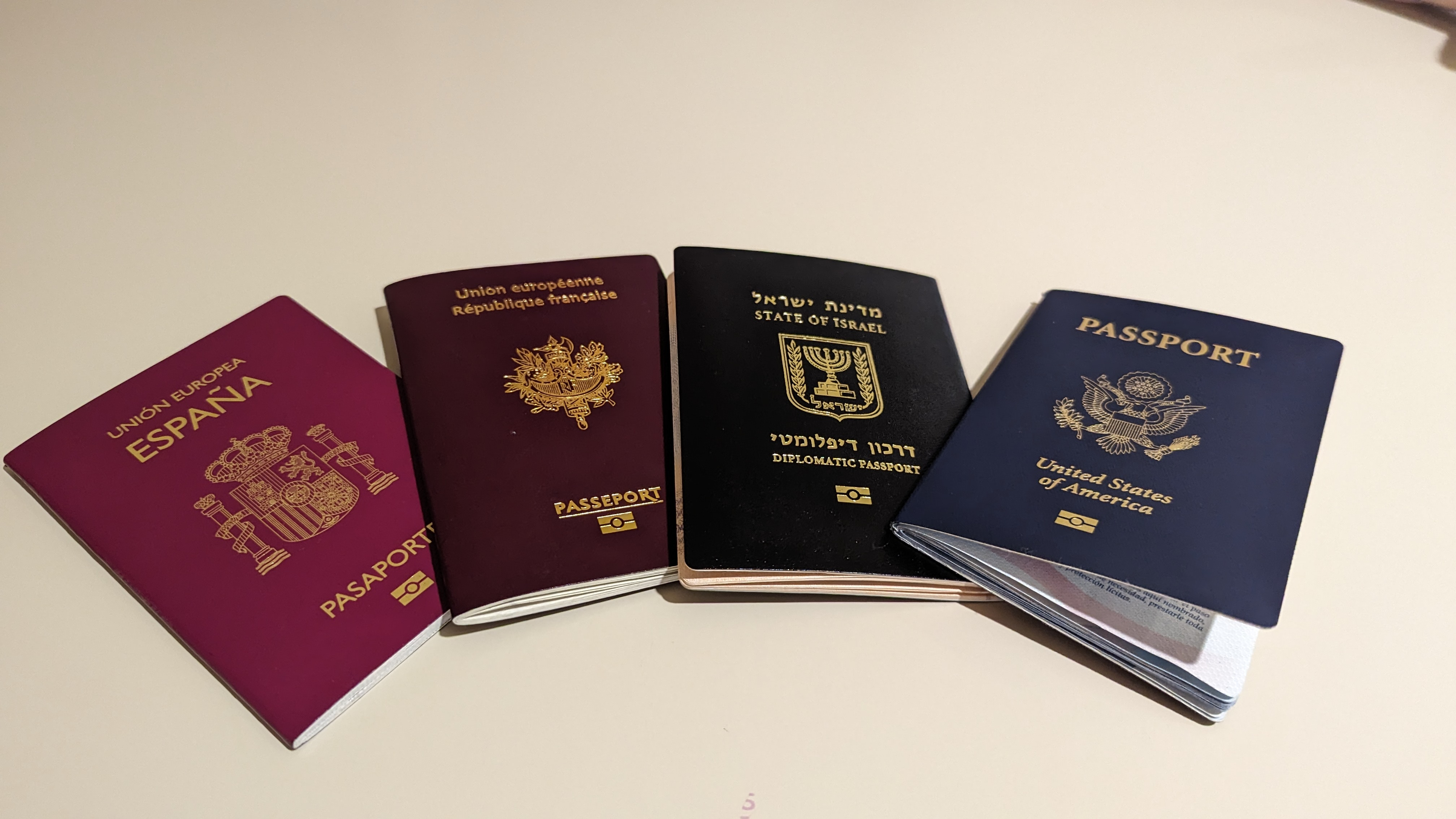
"Golden passport" programs grant citizenship to applicants who make a qualifying investment contribution to the country they are trying to enter.

Immigrant investor programs are immigration programs offered by countries or territories that allow individuals to more quickly obtain residence or citizenship of a country in return for making qualifying and substantive investments. Broadly, the programs offer either citizenship by investment ("golden passport" or "cash-for-passports"), residence by investment ("golden visa"), or a hybrid with immediate residence followed by accelerated citizenship.

Program applicants must usually fulfill multiple qualification criteria. Investment can take a variety of forms including a contribution to government funds; purchase of qualifying real estate (for example, in specific government-sanctioned projects); investment in a qualifying business (for example, in a specific industry); or creation of a set number of jobs.

== Citizenship by investment programs ==
Citizenship by investment programs enable the applicant to rapidly obtain citizenship with no required residence period, or only a short nominal period measured in days or weeks. These are often known as "golden passports" or "cash-for-passport" programs, offering visa-free travel and possible tax advantages.

As of mid-2023, more than twenty countries had citizenship by investment programs. These included five countries in the Caribbean Community (Antigua and Barbuda, Dominica, Grenada, Saint Kitts and Nevis and Saint Lucia), as well as Cambodia, Egypt, Jordan, Malta, North Macedonia, Turkey, Vanuatu and Nauru.

Countries that have historically offered citizenship by investment include Austria, Cyprus (closed), Moldova (closed),Malta (closed), and Montenegro (closed 31 December 2022).

Annually, an estimated 50,000 people, including family members of those who apply, obtain citizenship through investment programs, worldwide.

=== Argentina ===
In the context of its ongoing monetary crisis, in October 2026, Argentine president Javier Milei announced plans for the country to offer "golden passports" to individuals contributing $350,000 or investing $800,000 into a seven-year government bond. It is set to become the first South American country to offer citizenship by investment, with applications planning on opening by the end of 2026.

=== Dominica ===
Dominica implemented its program in 1993 to provide investors the opportunity to gain Dominican citizenship via a contribution to its Economic Diversification Fund or the purchase of an alternatively approved project along with a fee. As of 2022, Dominica requires a minimum donation of $100,000 in its Economic Diversification fund or a $200,000 minimum investment in a government approved real estate project.

=== Egypt ===
Egypt grants citizenship to investors who contribute $250,000 to the treasury, invest $300,000 in state-owned property, fund a business with $350,000 plus a $100,000 donation, or place $500,000 in a refundable bank deposit for three years. The program launched in 2020 under Law No. 190/2019.

=== Jordan ===
Jordan's investment program was launched by the Cabinet of Jordan in February 2018 and grants citizenship to those who invest in certain areas of the country's programs (though the minimum investment value is placed around JOD 350,000).

=== Nauru ===
Nauru has officially introduced the Nauru Economic and Climate Resilience Citizenship Program (NECRCP), unveiled at the 2024 United Nations Climate Change Conference (COP 29) in Baku. The program is defined in Nauru Economic and Climate Resilience Citizenship Act No. 15 of 2024 Part 2, Section 4, 2025.

The passport will cost a minimum of $105,000, but will be prohibited for people with certain criminal histories.

The government says the program will help raise funds for climate action, needed for a plan to move 90% of the island's around 12,500-strong population onto higher ground and build an entirely new community.

=== Saint Kitts and Nevis ===
Saint Kitts and Nevis was the first country to offer citizenship by investment, starting in 1984. It requires a minimum of US$250,000 as an economic contribution to the country or to invest in an approved real estate development or property.

The minimum qualifying real estate investment was US$400,000 until 25 October 2024, when S.R.O No. 43 of 2024, the Citizenship by Substantial Investment (Amendment) Regulations 2024, reduced the minimum to US$325,000 for both approved development real estate and condominium units or shares in approved private real estate. The changes were made separately under provisions 6 and 9(a), amending regulations 20(12) and 22(10), respectively. Provision 9(b) also reduced the minimum investment for an approved private real estate single-family home from US$800,000 to US$600,000. At the same time, the minimum age at which a parent of the main applicant or their spouse could qualify as a dependent was reduced from 65 to 55. The government said the changes followed consultations with local and international stakeholders and reflected an effort to align the programme with market needs and support further economic growth.

=== St Lucia ===
St Lucia has offered citizenship by investment since 2015. It requires a minimum of $240,000 as a contribution to the National Economic Fund (main applicant + 3 dependents) or at least $300,000 into an approved real estate development.

=== Sao Tome and Principe ===
In 2025, Sao Tome and Principe (STP) established a citizenship-by-investment framework under Nationality Law No. 7/2022, regulated by Decree-Law No. 07/2025, the Regulamentacao da Nacionalidade por Investimento ou Doacao. The framework allows applicants to qualify for Santomean nationality by making a contribution to the National Transformation Fund (NTF) and sets out the applicable tariff and cost schedule, starting with a US$90,000 contribution for an individual applicant or US$95,000 for a family application of two to four members, with an additional US$5,000 for each additional dependent. The government requires an additional US$5,000 due diligence and processing fee per application. The contribution to the NTF is payable only after receiving approval in principle.

=== Turkey ===
The Turkish citizenship by investment program was launched in 2017. As of 2024, foreign investors can acquire Turkish citizenship by purchasing real estate worth at least $400,000 and committing to hold it for three years. Alternative options include a fixed deposit of $500,000 in a Turkish bank, or a similar investment in government bonds or a Turkish business. The application process typically takes between six to nine months.

=== Vanuatu ===
Vanuatu offers one of the fastest citizenship by investment programs in the world. Launched in 2017, the scheme grants citizenship in as little as one month in exchange for a minimum donation of $130,000 to the country's Development Support Program. No residency or language test is required, and family members can be included. While the program has boosted Vanuatu's economy, it faced EU criticism over due diligence, leading to tighter security checks in recent years.

=== Former schemes ===
==== Cyprus ====
The Cyprus Investment Program allowed foreign investors to gain Cyprus citizenship by investing €2,000,000 in an approved category. The program was closed on 1 November 2020. A later review found that 53% of the passports were illegally issued.

==== Malta ====
The Malta Individual Investor Programme, which Henley & Partners was contracted in 2014 by the Government of Malta to design and implement, was similarly capped at 1,800 applicants. The minimum investment for this program was $870,000 with a non-refundable contribution of $700,000.

On the 29th of April 2025, in CJEU Case C-181/23, Malta's transactional investor-citizenship scheme was ruled contrary to EU law. A 2026 report by Kestrel Private, After the EU's Golden Passports, analyzing the situation and aftermath cites this Malta judgment as the final stage in the coordinated closure of the EU retail investor-citizenship market, after Cyprus and Bulgaria. Following Austria's approach, Maltese citizenship may still be acquired through other forms of naturalization, including the typical residence-based and discretionary naturalization on the basis of merit or exceptional contribution.

==== Montenegro ====
Citizenship of Montenegro could be obtained within a year through an investment of €250,000 into approved development projects and a €200,000 government fee, until the program ended in 2022.

== Residence by investment programs ==
Residence by investment programs allow an applicant to obtain a permanent residency visa for a country by making an investment such as purchase of property or investment in a business. These programs are often known as "golden visas". The programs (on their own) do not allow the applicant to obtain citizenship. However, the person may eventually be able to apply for citizenship using standard naturalization procedures after residing in the country for a required amount of time.

Many users of such programs are wealthy Chinese and Russian citizens seeking legal security and a better quality of life outside of their home country. Golden visas have been especially popular with Chinese nationals, over 100,000 of whom acquired them during the period from 2007 to 2016. In 2015, the majority of golden visas were issued to Chinese nationals.

Numerous governments offer these programs including in Abkhazia, Australia, Brazil, Greece, Hong Kong, Malta, Monaco, New Zealand, Portugal, Singapore, Spain, Ukraine, the United Arab Emirates, the United Kingdom and the United States.

=== In operation ===
==== Belize ====
Belize offers an investor residency program with a real estate investment of $250,000 and after 5 years an individual is eligible for Belizean citizenship which offers a CARICOM passport for travel.

==== Greece ====
Introduced in 2013, the Greek Golden Visa program offers residency to non-EEA nationals in exchange for specific direct investments in real estate or financial instruments, as an incentive to attract international capital flows. The program originally requires a minimum investment of €250,000 in real estate or €400,000 in securities or a bank deposit in Greece. The investors' close family members also receive a residence permit without further investment requirements, including their spouse, children up to 21 years old, parents and parents-in-law.

By February 2023, the country had issued 10,105 residence permits to investors and 18,154 to their family members. On 23 December 2022, the golden visa program was changed, setting the 5 year visa at a minimum of €500,000 for real estate investments in specific areas of the country, coming into effect on 1 August 2023.

As of September 2024, Greece's revised Golden Visa Program requires a minimum real estate investment of €800,000, except on islands with fewer than 3,100 residents, where the threshold is halved to €400,000. Investors are restricted to purchasing a single residential property of at least 120 square meters and are barred from short-term rentals. Violations incur a €50,000 fine and revocation of residency rights.

The visa grants residency exclusively in Greece and does not permit employment or guarantee citizenship. Naturalization requires seven consecutive years of tax residency (minimum 183 days annually), a Greek language and culture exam, and, for males aged 18–45, completion of compulsory military service unless exempted.

For comparison, ordinary residence visas are available, such as for Financially Independent Persons, or Freelance remote workers, that have a minimum income requirement with private medical insurance, and do not involve investment.

==== Hungary ====
Investing €155,000 in any completed residential property in Hungary or creating a local company to provide services, or to trade in goods, will give the investor a temporary residence permit for themselves and their family. Residential investment can give a permit lasting 5 years and the company route, 3 years. These visas are renewable. 3 years of continuous residence allows a permanent residence permit to be applied for. Seven years residency and passing a language exam will open the opportunity to acquire citizenship and a Hungarian passport.

==== Italy ====
A two year residence permit achieved with buying a house, investing or donating €1,000,000. Investments being €250,000 in a start up, €500,000 in an Italian company or €2,000,000 in government bonds. Extendable for three years periods and after 10 years may be eligible for citizenship.

==== Latvia ====
An investment of €50,000 into a Latvian company, provided the company pays at least €40,000 per annum in tax will gain the investor a five-year residency after paying a one-off €10,000 fee to the government. The residency is renewable or it can be converted to permanent residency after four years of residency. Citizenship is obtainable after 10 years.

==== New Zealand ====
In April 2025, New Zealand changed the Active Investor Plus residency-by-investment visa programme to adjust its investment and eligibility requirements. It requires a minimum investment of NZ$5 million, with eligibility for citizenship after three to five years of residency. As of the end of August 2025, 42% of applicants are from the United States, followed by 15% from China and 12% from Hong Kong.

==== Portugal ====
Portugal introduced a residence-by-investment programme commonly known as the Portugal Golden Visa in October 2012 during the Great Recession, with the aim of attracting foreign investment into the Portuguese economy, particularly through investment in the country's real-estate market.

The programme, formally known as the Residence Permit for Investment Activity (ARI), grants residence permits to non-European Union nationals who make qualifying investments in Portugal.

The Portuguese scheme forms part of a broader category of residence-by-investment programmes used by countries to attract foreign capital and high-net-worth migrants.

===== History =====
Portugal launched the golden visa programme in 2012 as part of efforts to attract international capital following the country's sovereign debt crisis.

The scheme quickly became one of the most widely known residence-by-investment programmes in Europe.

By 2023 Portugal had issued more than 10,000 golden visas to investors, excluding accompanying family members.

Chinese nationals represented the largest group of investors, followed by investors from Brazil, the United States and other countries.

===== Eligibility and investment routes =====
The eligibility criteria for the Portuguese golden visa programme have evolved over time as the government revised the scheme.

Qualifying investments currently include:

- investment in venture capital or private-equity funds,
- business investment and job creation,
- funding for scientific research,
- financial support for artistic production or cultural heritage preservation.

Prior to reforms introduced in 2023, the programme also allowed eligibility through real estate acquisition and certain capital transfers to Portuguese financial institutions.

The real estate investment route was removed as part of housing policy reforms intended to address rising housing prices and redirect foreign investment towards other sectors of the economy.

Applicants granted an ARI residence permit obtain the right to reside in Portugal and travel within the Schengen Area.

After meeting legal requirements they may apply for permanent residence or Portuguese citizenship.

===== Economic impact =====
By 2024 the programme had attracted more than €7 billion in foreign investment since its creation.

A large proportion of the investment historically flowed into the Portuguese real estate market, particularly during the first years of the programme.

===== Housing debate and reforms =====
The programme became controversial amid rising housing prices and concerns about housing affordability in Portuguese cities. House prices in Lisbon rose by 176% between 2014 and 2024.

Critics argued that residence-by-investment schemes could contribute to speculative property investment and price increases.

In February 2023 the Portuguese government announced plans to end the golden visa programme as part of a housing policy package.

Later reforms retained the programme but eliminated real estate purchases as an eligible investment category and redirected the scheme toward other investment routes such as funds and business investment.

===== Administrative delays and legal disputes =====
In the early 2020s the programme experienced administrative delays due to a backlog of immigration applications.

Some applicants initiated legal actions seeking to accelerate the processing of their residence permit applications.

Government officials have acknowledged broader immigration backlogs affecting several types of residence permits in Portugal.

==== Russia ====
Russia opened its Investor Visa program on 31 December 2022. It provides the opportunity to gain permanent residency in Russia for the applicant and their direct family. To apply, one has to either sponsor a social project, purchase real estate, invest in a business, or start their own company. The residency can be converted to citizenship after 5 years.

==== Spain ====
In 2013, Spain introduced a Golden Visa for residency with an investment of €500,000 in unmortgaged real estate, €1,000,000 in Spanish companies, or €2,000,000 in Spanish government bonds. This visa is also available to people with a business project that will make a "significant" contribution to the Spanish economy. The Golden Visa also allows holders to travel freely to and from Spain without taking up (tax) residency, as long as they visit the country once per year to renew the visa. However, because the visa itself is considered equivalent to a residency card, holders also have the right to travel within the Schengen area on visa-waiver conditions, which is a considerable advantage to citizens of certain countries who might otherwise have difficulties obtaining Schengen visitor visas.

On 8 April 2024 Spanish Prime Minister Pedro Sánchez announced that his government would terminate the Golden Visa, but without specifying an exact end date.

==== United Arab Emirates ====
The United Arab Emirates (UAE) introduced the 10 year Golden Visa system in 2019. It allows qualifying individuals to live, study and work in UAE without the need of a national sponsor. The residence visa program, offers various possibility to become a resident in the UAE for certain category of professionals, such as PhD holders, scientists, outstanding professional in a specific field or industry and/or to doctors and their families. Other skilled professionals included are senior scholars, elite specialists in industry and fourth industrial revolution, specialists in health industry and education.

The visa duration is 10 years for public investments and 5 years for real estate investments. Requirements include a minimum capital of AED 2 million, along with property ownership or contribution to an establishment paying at least AED 250,000 annually in taxes.

Golden visa holders are allowed to sponsor others, including their spouse, children and support staff. The visa can be renewed if the required criteria is met. Unlike some other golden visa programs which requires the visa holder to maintain a duration of stay in the country, the UAE golden visa has no restriction on the maximum duration of stay outside the UAE to maintain validity of the visa.

The UAE Golden Visa costs AED 9,884.75 for investors.

==== United States ====
The United States has three main investor visa programs: the E-2, EB-5 visas, or an application to the Trump Gold Card program.

The E-2 visa investor program allows foreign nationals of specific treaty countries to invest in a start up, buy a business or a franchise to reside legally in the U.S. The initial visa term varies from three months to five years depending on the U.S. reciprocity schedule with the applicant's country of citizenship. The E-2 visa can be renewed indefinitely and it is possible for the investor to change their legal status to a green card (e.g. EB-1A, EB-2, EB-3 or EB-5). The E-2 visa investor must commit to investing a substantial amount (generally US$100,000) and create American jobs (usually 2+). Most investments under US$200,000 will require the investor to work 40+ hours a week in the business at least for the first 12 to 18 months.

As per recent changes made to the US regulation, individuals holding a passport from a treaty country are required to be domiciled there for a period of three years before being eligible to apply for the E-2 investor visa. This amendment was introduced as investors who were not from the treaty countries would obtain citizenship in one of the treaty countries to become eligible for the E-2 visa program.

The EB-5 visa program is administered by the U.S. Citizenship and Immigration Services (USCIS). Successful applicants and their family can apply for a green card. The EB-5 visa program, which is also called as the Golden Visa program, requires applicants to invest between US$900,000 and US$1.8 million, depending on the location of the project, and requires at least 10 jobs to be either created or preserved. Created in 1990, the program was intended to boost the U.S. economy with the help of foreign investors and overall job growth.

There is an annual cap of 10,000 applications under the EB-5 program. The program is designed to encourage foreign investment in infrastructure projects, particularly in Targeted Employment Areas (TEA) with high unemployment. Funds are channeled through businesses known as regional centers, now designated only by the U.S. Department of Homeland Security. An example of a project is a US$200 million development by the Pennsylvania Turnpike Commission. In addition to the regional centers, various advisory firms, such as EB5 BRICS, provide services to potential investors seeking guidance on the application process and project opportunities under the EB-5 program.

In March 2022, the EB-5 program was overhauled with the passage of new legislation called the EB-5 Reform and Integrity Act (RIA). Changes were introduced by RIA to enhance the appeal of the program. RIA allows concurrent filing which permits investors to live and work in the USA while waiting for the adjudication of their EB-5 applications.

The Trump Gold Card is an immigrant investor program offered by the United States that grants investors automatic eligibility for non-immigrant or EB-1 or EB-2 immigrant visas, as well as a pathway for US lawful permanent resident status. The Trump Gold Card program was introduced by President Donald Trump in his second term to provide prospective investors a pathway to gain lawful permanent resident status, following a substantive lump sum donation to the US federal government, and paying the applicable processing fees to the United States Citizenship and Immigration Services (USCIS).

==== Cyprus ====
Introduced in 2012, with several subsequent amendments, the Cyprus Golden Visa or Residency by Investment Program allows applicants who invest at least €300,000 +19% VAT in an approved category to apply for permanent residency in Cyprus.

=== Discontinued ===
==== Canada ====
The country historically had a national-level Canadian Immigrant Investor Program since 1986, but it was suspended in 2014. Most of the applicants were Chinese, who preferred to settle on the Pacific coast. The program has been associated with the lack of housing affordability in Vancouver.

Quebec maintains its own program, also established in 1986 – the Quebec Immigrant Investor Program – since the province has the right to set its own immigration policy due to a legal agreement with the federal government. The program was suspended between 2019 and 2024 by the province, citing problems with the program's "integrity" and low retention rate. In 2024, the government reopened the reformed program, which imposes more stringent financial requirements and requires the applicants to be fluent in French, barring the majority of potential investors.

==== Ireland ====
Introduced in 2012 the "Immigrant Investor Program" (IIP) offered non-EEA nationals residence permission based on long-term investment into enterprises, investment funds, real-estate or non-profits in the Republic of Ireland. It offered a path to citizenship in Ireland through living in Ireland under the programme.

The IIP closed in early 2023. Since 2012 the program has brought €1.17 billion to Ireland. The majority of investments were made by Chinese nationals.

==== United Kingdom ====
The UK had a program known as a Tier 1 (Investor) visa, which opened for applicants in 2008. Applicants were required to invest £2 million or more in the UK and meet other eligibility criteria. Visa holders could reside in the UK for a maximum of 3 years and 4 months, with the ability to apply for an extension of 2 more years. The visa holder could apply to settle after 5 years or less; the greater the investment, the shorter the waiting period. According to the Home Office, 255 visas of this type were granted in the first half of 2019.

The Tier 1 (Investor) visa scheme was closed to new applicants on 17 February 2022.

== Hybrid residence-citizenship programs ==
Hybrid residence-citizenship programs allow applicants to first obtain residence and then, after an accelerated residence period (as short as 2 years), obtain citizenship.

This type of program was offered by a number of countries including Bulgaria, Hungary, Mauritius and Samoa.

- The Bulgarian scheme allows a company, or part of a company, to be brought to the country, or to create a new company that will employ at least 10 locals, or to invest in residential property, to apply for a D class visa and Bulgarian residence.
- The Hungarian program required a €300,000 purchase of interest free government bonds, repayable in 5 years, plus a €60,000 one off fee for the applicant, which covered all family members, the 5 year visa was renewable at no extra cost and citizenship could be applied for after 8 years. Opened in 2013, it closed in 2017.
- In Mauritius an investor needs to buy a luxury residential property in a specific development, or a ten year investment into a choice of businesses.

== Controversy ==
Immigrant Investor Programs have faced scrutiny and criticism by governments and intergovernmental organizations such as the Financial Action Task Force and the Organisation for Economic Co-operation and Development for enabling various white-collar illicit activities, undermining a country's national security, proliferating the violation of sanctions, and stripping the concept of citizenship to a commodity.

In 2014 the European Parliament approved a non-binding resolution that an EU passport should not have a "price tag".

Following the 2022 Russian invasion of Ukraine, the Biden Administration in the US described golden passport programs as a loophole for wealthy Russians to get around sanctions. Money laundering scandals involving banks in Malta and Latvia have made citizenship schemes more contentious by drawing attention to the lack of controls on sanctioned Russian funds entering EU countries.

In 2023, the European Commission proposed revising the rules on visa-free travel from countries with golden passport programs. In 2024, the European Council agreed on a draft regulation that would update a mechanism to suspend visa-free access for "third countries", which include the operation of an investor citizenship scheme as a valid grounds for suspension of visa-free access. The United Kingdom also withdrew visa-free travel from Dominica, Honduras, Namibia, Timor-Leste and Vanuatu, citing "clear and evident abuse of the scheme, including the granting of citizenship to individuals known to pose a risk to the UK".

In January 2026, the United States expanded entry restrictions under Presidential Proclamation 10998, targeting countries with vetting deficiencies. A key focus is the “partial suspension” of entry for nationals from countries with Citizenship by Investment (CBI) programs, specifically Antigua and Barbuda and Dominica, which are considered security risks for allowing individuals to bypass screening and residency requirements through purchased passports. Nationals from these CBI countries face restrictions on immigrant visas and certain nonimmigrant categories (B, F, M, and J). In addition, a new visa bond program, effective 21 January, requires travelers from these nations to post bonds up to $15,000 for visitor visas, and USCIS has placed a hold on pending benefit applications for all affected nationals to undergo national security reviews.

== Reform ==
Eastern Caribbean states operating citizenship-by-investment programs — Antigua and Barbuda, Dominica, Grenada, Saint Kitts and Nevis, and Saint Lucia — published proposals for a new regional regulatory framework in July 2025. The draft proposed that new citizens establish a greater connection with the granting state, including through a 30 day physical presence in the first five years after gaining citizenship. It also proposed new requirements on integration activities with the local society done by the applicants, and a quota system would also be introduced.

== See also ==
- Economic citizenship
- Immigration tariff
