= Immigration tariff =

Charge levied on immigrants wanting permanent residency

An immigration tariff or migrant levy is a charge levied on immigrants wanting permanent residency within a nation. As a means of applying price theory to a nation's immigration policy, it is generally advocated as an alternative to existing bureaucratic procedures as a means of moderating or better regulating the flow of immigration to a given level.

There are pros and cons of having a migrant levy. It generates revenue for the government of the host country. However, it serves as a financial burden to immigrants, which in turn serves as a barrier on immigration. From a neoliberal economics perspective, it also serves as an economic inefficiency (as do any other government interventions into immigration).

The International Labour Organization describes migrant levies in the following way:

"Some governments of labour-receiving countries earn sizeable revenues through levies on firms employing foreign workers, the burden of which may partly or fully be passed on to the workers themselves. Malaysia and Singapore are examples of countries using selective levies."

Alex Nowrasteh, an immigration policy analyst, wrote a policy analysis arguing for immigration tariffs for the Competitive Enterprise Institute.

The idea of an immigration tariff frequently associated with American economist Gary Becker, who stated, "When I mention this to people, they sometimes go hysterical."

In March 2015 the Australian government launched an inquiry into the use of an immigration tariff as an alternative to existing immigration arrangements.

== See also ==
- Economic citizenship
- Green card
- Immigrant investor programs
- Immigration law
- Permanent residency
- Tariff
- Travel visa
- Gary Becker
- Eric Weinstein
