= Next United Kingdom general election =

- On or before 15 August 2029
- All 650 seats in the House of Commons; 326 seats needed for a majority
- Opinion polls
Party	Leader	Last election
Labour	Andy Burnham	411 (Note: Includes 43 MPs sponsored by the Co-operative Party, who are designated Labour and Co-operative, and does not include Speaker Sir Lindsay Hoyle, a longtime MP for Labour.)
Conservative	Kemi Badenoch	121
Liberal Democrats	Ed Davey	72
SNP	John Swinney (Note: Dave Doogan leads the SNP in the House of Commons.)	9
Sinn Féin	Mary Lou McDonald (Note: Sinn Féin are an all-Ireland political party with an abstentionist stance from the UK Parliament. McDonald is a TD (Republic of Ireland MP). Michelle O'Neill leads Sinn Féin in Northern Ireland.)	7
Reform	Nigel Farage	5
DUP	Gavin Robinson	5
Green (E&W)	Zack Polanski (Note: Ellie Chowns leads the Greens in the House of Commons.)	4
Plaid Cymru	Rhun ap Iorwerth (Note: Liz Saville Roberts leads Plaid Cymru in the House of Commons.)	4
SDLP	Claire Hanna	2
Alliance	Naomi Long (Note: Sorcha Eastwood is the sole Alliance Party MP in the House of Commons.)	1
UUP	Jon Burrows (Note: Robin Swann is the sole Ulster Unionist Party MP in the House of Commons.)	1
TUV	Jim Allister	1
Independents	N/A	6
Speaker	Lindsay Hoyle	1
Incumbent Prime Minister
Andy Burnham; Labour

The next United Kingdom general election is scheduled to be held no later than 15 August 2029. It will determine the composition of the House of Commons.

== Background ==
=== 2024 election ===
The 2024 general election resulted in a landslide victory for the Labour Party led by Keir Starmer, but with the smallest share of the electoral vote of any majority government since record-keeping of the popular vote began in 1830. The combined vote share for Labour and the Conservatives reached a record low, with smaller parties doing well. Labour returned to being the largest party in Scotland and remained so in Wales. The election was noted as the most disproportionate in modern British history, mainly as a result of the first-past-the-post voting system.

The Conservative Party under Rishi Sunak lost 251 seats and suffered their worst ever defeat, ending their 14-year tenure as the primary governing party. The Conservatives won no seats in Wales and only one seat in North East England. On 2 November 2024, Kemi Badenoch won the 2024 Conservative leadership election to succeed Sunak, becoming the first Black British person to become the Conservative leader.

Reform UK, led by Nigel Farage, came third in the share of the vote in the 2024 election and had MPs elected to the Commons for the first time. Meanwhile, the Liberal Democrats, led by Ed Davey, made significant gains especially in seat terms to reach their highest number of seats since (as their predecessor Liberal Party) the 1920s (and highest since the merger with the SDP). The Green Party of England and Wales also won a record number of votes and seats alongside a number of independent MPs. The Scottish National Party (SNP) lost around three-quarters of its seats.

=== Current composition of the House of Commons ===
This table relates to the composition of the House of Commons after the 2024 United Kingdom general election. As of 2 November 2026, it summarises the changes in party affiliation that took place during the 2024–present Parliament.

Affiliation	Members		
Affiliation	Elected in 2024	Current	Difference
Labour (Note: The Labour total includes 43 MPs elected in 2024 (43 current MPs as at 19 June 2026) who are sponsored by the Co-operative Party and are designated Labour and Co-operative.)	411 (Note: Some media outlets, such as BBC News, listed Labour's total as 412, by including the Speaker (who, to demonstrate his neutrality, had resigned his Labour Party membership on taking office).)	404 (Note: Includes one deputy speaker) (Note: The Speaker and three deputy speakers by convention comprise two MPs from the government side and two from the opposition side. They do not vote in House of Commons divisions and exercise only a casting vote.)	▼7
Conservative	121	118 (Note: Includes two deputy speakers)	▼3
Liberal Democrats	72	71	▼1
SNP	9	8	▼1
Reform	5	8	▲3
Sinn Féin (Note: Sinn Féin's seven MPs follow a policy of abstentionism. They do not swear into the House of Commons, and do not take part in its formal processes. As a result, they are not able to sit or vote in the House of Commons.)	7	7	Steady
Green (E&W)	4	5	▲1
DUP	5	4	▼1
Plaid Cymru	4	4	Steady
Ind. Alliance (Note: Independent politicians affiliated to the Independent Alliance group of MPs. Some sources group Independent Alliance MPs with other independent MPs, instead of treating the Independent Alliance as a separate group.)	–	4	▲4
SDLP	2	2	Steady
Your Party	–	2	▲2
Alliance	1	1	Steady
UUP	1	1	Steady
TUV	1	1	Steady
Restore	–	1	▲1
Speaker	1	1	Steady
Independent (Note: Unaffiliated independent politicians)	6	8	▲2
Total MPs	650	650	Steady
Total voting	639	639	Steady
Government majority (Note: Total number of MPs on the government side minus MPs on the opposition side. The government side comprises all Labour MPs. The opposition side comprises all other MPs (except the Speaker).)	173	159	▼14
Working majority (Note: Total number of voting MPs on the government side minus voting MPs on the opposition side)	181	167	▼14

For full details of changes during the 2024–present Parliament, see By-elections and Defections, suspensions and resignations.

=== Events since 2024 ===
The 2025 United Kingdom local elections led to a rise in the number of seats held by smaller parties at the expense of the Conservatives and Labour. On 2 September 2025, Zack Polanski was elected as leader of the Green Party of England and Wales in a landslide, with 85% of the vote share succeeding Carla Denyer and Adrian Ramsay in that position. The party's membership figures doubled, from around 70,000 to over 140,000, overtaking the Liberal Democrats and Conservatives.

On 17 July 2026, Andy Burnham won the 2026 Labour Party leadership election (having won the 2026 Makerfield by-election a month prior) to succeed Starmer, and was appointed as prime minister on 20 July.

== Electoral system ==
=== Voting eligibility ===
At present, in order to vote in general elections, one must be:

- on the Electoral Register,
- aged 18 or over on polling day,
- a British citizen, a Commonwealth citizen (with leave to remain or not requiring it) or a citizen of the Republic of Ireland,
- a resident at an address in the United Kingdom (or a British citizen living abroad), and
- not legally excluded from voting (for example a convicted person detained in prison or a mental hospital, or unlawfully at large if they would otherwise have been detained, or a person found guilty of certain corrupt or illegal practices, or a sitting Member of the House of Lords)

Individuals must be registered to vote by midnight twelve working days before polling day. Anyone who qualifies as an anonymous elector has approximately five working days before polling day to register. A person who has two homes (such as a university student who has a term-time address and lives at home during holidays) may be able to register to vote at both addresses as long as they are not in the same electoral area, but can only vote in one constituency at the general election. In July 2025, the government announced plans to reduce the voting age to 16 before the next general election. Extending the vote to 16- and 17-year-olds would add well over a million potential voters across England and Northern Ireland. Analysts found that this would expand voter participation, but the additional votes would represent only a small share of the national electorate.

=== Members not standing for re-election ===
Members of Parliament not standing for re-election
Portrait	MP	Seat	First elected	Party	Date announced
	Helen Grant	Maidstone and Malling	2010	Conservative	19 July 2026
	James Cleverly	Braintree	2015	Conservative	29 August 2026
	Christine Jardine	Edinburgh West	2017	Liberal Democrats	26 September 2026

== Date of the election ==
Under the Dissolution and Calling of Parliament Act 2022, the prime minister has the power to request the monarch call an election at any time during the five-year length of a parliamentary session. If the prime minister chooses not to do this, then parliament is automatically dissolved five years after the day it first met, and a general election is held 25 working days after dissolution. Parliament first met on 9 July 2024, meaning that unless Parliament is dissolved earlier it will be automatically dissolved on 9 July 2029, and the latest an election could be held is 15 August 2029.

In September 2026, speculation of an early general election mounted amid media reports that Prime Minister Andy Burnham was being encouraged by advisors to call a snap election in early 2027. However, Burnham quickly denied any intention of calling an early election. When asked whether the next election would take place in 2029 specifically, he replied "Yes, that's when the next election will be."

== Opinion polling ==
Following the election, Labour's lead in polls collapsed, with Nigel Farage's Reform UK gaining the lead by spring 2025. Following the election of Zack Polanski as leader of the Green Party of England and Wales in September 2025, the party surged in polls, gaining even more support after winning the Gorton and Denton by-election in February 2026. However, after Starmer's resignation due to a leadership crisis caused by heavy losses in 2026 local elections and replacement by Andy Burnham as Prime Minister in July 2026, Labour retook the lead, gaining back support from the Greens and Liberal Democrats. Meanwhile, Reform lost support due to scandals around the party and the formation of the far-right Restore Britain party. Labour further increased their vote share and lead on other parties after Burnham's speech at the 2026 Labour Party Conference and the party's victory in the Holborn and St Pancras by-election.

Opinion polling for the next United Kingdom general election is being carried out continually by various organisations to gauge voting intention. Most of the polling companies listed are members of the British Polling Council (BPC) and abide by its disclosure rules. The dates for these opinion polls range from the 2024 general election on 4 July to the present day.

== Declared candidates ==
=== England ===
Constituency	Labour	Conservative	Liberal Democrats	Reform UK	Green Party	Others	Incumbent		
Aldershot								Labour	Alex Baker
Aldridge-Brownhills		Wendy Morton (Note: Incumbent MP seeking reelection)						Conservative	Wendy Morton
Altrincham and Sale West			Jane Brophy					Labour	Connor Rand
Amber Valley								Labour	Linsey Farnsworth
Arundel and South Downs								Conservative	Andrew Griffith
Ashfield								Reform	Lee Anderson
Ashford		Johnny Shilton						Labour	Sojan Joseph
Ashton-under-Lyne								Labour	Angela Rayner
Aylesbury		Jane MacBean						Labour	Laura Kyrke-Smith
Banbury								Labour	Sean Woodcock
Barking								Labour	Nesil Caliskan
Barnsley North								Labour	Dan Jarvis
Barnsley South								Labour	Stephanie Peacock
Barrow and Furness								Labour	Michelle Scrogham
Basildon and Billericay								Conservative	Richard Holden
Basingstoke								Labour	Luke Murphy
Bassetlaw								Labour	Jo White
Bath								Liberal Democrats	Wera Hobhouse
Battersea								Labour	Marsha de Cordova
Beaconsfield			Anna Crabtree					Conservative	Joy Morrissey
Beckenham and Penge								Labour	Liam Conlon
Bedford								Labour	Mohammad Yasin
Bermondsey and Old Southwark								Labour	Neil Coyle
Bethnal Green and Stepney								Labour	Rushanara Ali
Beverley and Holderness								Conservative	Graham Stuart
Bexhill and Battle								Conservative	Kieran Mullan
Bexleyheath and Crayford								Labour	Daniel Francis
Bicester and Woodstock								Liberal Democrats	Calum Miller
Birkenhead								Labour	Alison McGovern
Birmingham Edgbaston								Labour	Preet Gill
Birmingham Erdington								Labour	Paulette Hamilton
Birmingham Hall Green and Moseley								Labour	Tahir Ali
Birmingham Hodge Hill								Labour	Liam Byrne
Birmingham Ladywood								Labour	Shabana Mahmood
Birmingham Northfield								Labour	Laurence Turner
Birmingham Perry Barr								Independent Alliance	Ayoub Khan (Note: Elected as an independent)
Birmingham Selly Oak								Labour	Alistair Carns
Birmingham Yardley								Labour	Jess Phillips
Bishop Auckland								Labour	Sam Rushworth
Blackburn								Independent Alliance	Adnan Hussain
Blackley and Middleton South								Labour	Graham Stringer
Blackpool North and Fleetwood								Labour	Lorraine Beavers
Blackpool South								Labour	Chris Webb
Blaydon and Consett								Labour	Liz Twist
Blyth and Ashington								Labour	Ian Lavery
Bognor Regis and Littlehampton								Conservative	Alison Griffiths
Bolsover								Labour	Natalie Fleet
Bolton North East								Labour	Kirith Entwistle
Bolton South and Walkden								Labour	Yasmin Qureshi
Bolton West								Labour	Phil Brickell
Bootle								Labour	Peter Dowd
Boston and Skegness								Reform	Richard Tice
Bournemouth East								Labour	Tom Hayes
Bournemouth West								Labour	Jessica Toale
Bracknell			Jo Hawley					Labour	Peter Swallow
Bradford East								Labour	Imran Hussain
Bradford South								Labour	Judith Cummins
Bradford West								Labour	Naz Shah
Braintree								Conservative	James Cleverly (Note: Incumbent MP has announced intention to retire)
Brent East								Labour	Dawn Butler
Brent West								Labour	Barry Gardiner
Brentford and Isleworth								Labour	Ruth Cadbury
Brentwood and Ongar			Edward Sainsbury					Conservative	Alex Burghart
Bridgwater			Graham Oakes					Conservative	Ashley Fox
Bridlington and The Wolds								Conservative	Charlie Dewhirst
Brigg and Immingham								Conservative	Martin Vickers
Brighton Kemptown and Peacehaven								Labour	Chris Ward
Brighton Pavilion								Green	Siân Berry
Bristol Central								Green	Carla Denyer
Bristol East								Labour	Kerry McCarthy
Bristol North East								Labour	Damien Egan
Bristol North West								Labour	Darren Jones
Bristol South								Labour	Karin Smyth
Broadland and Fakenham								Conservative	Jerome Mayhew
Bromley and Biggin Hill								Conservative	Peter Fortune
Bromsgrove								Conservative	Bradley Thomas
Broxbourne			Freddie Jewitt					Conservative	Lewis Cocking
Broxtowe			David Watts					Labour	Juliet Campbell
Buckingham and Bletchley								Labour	Callum Anderson
Burnley			Gordon Birtwistle (Note: Former MP seeking to return to Parliament)			Don Whitaker (Restore)		Labour	Oliver Ryan
Burton and Uttoxeter								Labour	Jacob Collier
Bury North								Labour	James Frith
Bury South								Labour	Christian Wakeford
Bury St Edmunds and Stowmarket								Labour	Peter Prinsley
Calder Valley								Labour	Josh Fenton-Glynn
Camborne and Redruth						Roger Tarrant (Restore)		Labour	Perran Moon
Cambridge			Cheney Payne					Labour	Daniel Zeichner
Cannock Chase								Labour	Josh Newbury
Canterbury								Independent	Rosie Duffield (Note: Elected for the Labour Party)
Carlisle								Labour	Julie Minns
Carshalton and Wallington								Liberal Democrats	Bobby Dean
Castle Point								Conservative	Rebecca Harris
Central Devon			Ed Tyldesley					Conservative	Mel Stride
Central Suffolk and North Ipswich					Annette Dunning			Conservative	Patrick Spencer
Chatham and Aylesford								Labour	Tris Osborne
Cheadle			Tom Morrison					Liberal Democrats	Tom Morrison
Chelmsford			Marie Goldman					Liberal Democrats	Marie Goldman
Chelsea and Fulham		Tom Bennett						Labour	Ben Coleman
Cheltenham								Liberal Democrats	Max Wilkinson
Chesham and Amersham								Liberal Democrats	Sarah Green
Chester North and Neston			Carol Braithwaite					Labour	Samantha Dixon
Chester South and Eddisbury			Rob Herd					Conservative	Aphra Brandreth
Chesterfield								Labour	Toby Perkins
Chichester								Liberal Democrats	Jess Brown-Fuller
Chingford and Woodford Green		Iain Duncan Smith						Conservative	Iain Duncan Smith
Chippenham			Sarah Gibson					Liberal Democrats	Sarah Gibson
Chipping Barnet								Labour	Dan Tomlinson
Chorley								Speaker	Lindsay Hoyle
Christchurch								Conservative	Christopher Chope
Cities of London and Westminster								Labour	Rachel Blake
City of Durham								Labour	Mary Kelly Foy
Clacton								Reform	Nigel Farage
Clapham and Brixton Hill								Labour	Bell Ribeiro-Addy
Colchester								Labour	Pam Cox
Colne Valley								Labour	Paul Davies
Congleton								Labour	Sarah Russell
Corby and East Northamptonshire								Labour	Lee Barron
Coventry East								Labour	Mary Creagh
Coventry North West								Labour	Taiwo Owatemi
Coventry South								Your Party	Zarah Sultana
Cramlington and Killingworth								Labour	Emma Foody
Crawley								Labour	Peter Lamb
Crewe and Nantwich								Labour	Connor Naismith
Croydon East								Labour	Natasha Irons
Croydon South								Conservative	Chris Philp
Croydon West								Labour	Sarah Jones
Dagenham and Rainham								Labour	Margaret Mullane
Darlington								Labour	Lola McEvoy
Dartford								Labour	Jim Dickson
Daventry			Jonathan Harris					Conservative	Stuart Andrew
Derby North								Labour	Catherine Atkinson
Derby South								Labour	Baggy Shanker
Derbyshire Dales			Barry Holliday					Labour	John Whitby
Dewsbury and Batley								Independent Alliance	Iqbal Mohamed
Didcot and Wantage								Liberal Democrats	Olly Glover
Doncaster Central								Labour	Sally Jameson
Doncaster East and the Isle of Axholme								Labour	Lee Pitcher
Doncaster North								Labour	Ed Miliband
Dorking and Horley								Liberal Democrats	Chris Coghlan
Dover and Deal								Labour	Mike Tapp
Droitwich and Evesham		Nigel Huddleston						Conservative	Nigel Huddleston
Dudley								Labour	Sonia Kumar
Dulwich and West Norwood								Labour	Helen Hayes
Dunstable and Leighton Buzzard								Labour	Alex Mayer
Ealing Central and Acton								Labour	Rupa Huq
Ealing North								Labour	James Murray
Ealing Southall								Labour	Deirdre Costigan
Earley and Woodley			Mike Giles					Labour	Yuan Yang
Easington								Labour	Grahame Morris
East Grinstead and Uckfield			Ben Dempsey					Conservative	Mims Davies
East Ham								Labour	Stephen Timms
East Hampshire			Dominic Martin					Conservative	Damian Hinds
East Surrey								Conservative	Claire Coutinho
East Thanet								Labour	Polly Billington
East Wiltshire			Edward Marsh					Reform	Danny Kruger (Note: Elected for the Conservative Party)
East Worthing and Shoreham								Labour	Tom Rutland
Eastbourne								Liberal Democrats	Josh Babarinde
Eastleigh			Liz Jarvis					Liberal Democrats	Liz Jarvis
Edmonton and Winchmore Hill								Labour	Kate Osamor
Ellesmere Port and Bromborough								Labour	Justin Madders
Eltham and Chislehurst								Labour	Clive Efford
Ely and East Cambridgeshire		Lucius Vellacott	Charlotte Cane					Liberal Democrats	Charlotte Cane
Enfield North								Labour	Feryal Clark
Epping Forest								Conservative	Neil Hudson
Epsom and Ewell			Helen Maguire					Liberal Democrats	Helen Maguire
Erewash								Labour	Adam Thompson
Erith and Thamesmead								Labour	Abena Oppong-Asare
Esher and Walton								Liberal Democrats	Monica Harding
Exeter			Jonnie Beddall					Labour	Steve Race
Exmouth and Exeter East			Charlotte FitzGerald					Conservative	David Reed
Fareham and Waterlooville								Reform	Suella Braverman
Farnham and Bordon			Khalil Yousuf					Conservative	Greg Stafford
Faversham and Mid Kent								Conservative	Helen Whately
Feltham and Heston								Labour	Seema Malhotra
Filton and Bradley Stoke			Eden Lunt					Labour	Claire Hazelgrove
Finchley and Golders Green								Labour	Sarah Sackman
Folkestone and Hythe								Labour	Tony Vaughan
Forest of Dean								Labour	Matt Bishop
Frome and East Somerset								Liberal Democrats	Anna Sabine
Fylde								Conservative	Andrew Snowden
Gainsborough								Conservative	Edward Leigh
Gateshead Central and Whickham								Labour	Mark Ferguson
Gedling								Labour	Michael Payne
Gillingham and Rainham								Labour	Naushabah Khan
Glastonbury and Somerton			Sarah Dyke					Liberal Democrats	Sarah Dyke
Gloucester								Labour	Alex McIntyre
Godalming and Ash								Conservative	Jeremy Hunt
Goole and Pocklington								Conservative	David Davis
Gorton and Denton								Green	Hannah Spencer
Gosport								Conservative	Caroline Dinenage
Grantham and Bourne								Conservative	Gareth Davies
Gravesham								Labour	Lauren Sullivan
Great Grimsby and Cleethorpes								Labour	Melanie Onn
Great Yarmouth								Restore	Rupert Lowe (Note: Elected for Reform)
Greenwich and Woolwich								Labour	Matthew Pennycook
Guildford			Zöe Franklin					Liberal Democrats	Zöe Franklin
Hackney North and Stoke Newington								Labour	Diane Abbott
Hackney South and Shoreditch								Labour	Meg Hillier
Halesowen								Labour	Alex Ballinger
Halifax								Labour	Kate Dearden
Hamble Valley								Conservative	Paul Holmes
Hammersmith and Chiswick								Labour	Andy Slaughter
Hampstead and Highgate			Katie Mansfield					Labour	Tulip Siddiq
Harborough, Oadby and Wigston								Conservative	Neil O'Brien
Harlow		Hannah Ellis						Labour	Chris Vince
Harpenden and Berkhamsted			Victoria Collins					Liberal Democrats	Victoria Collins
Harrogate and Knaresborough			Tom Gordon					Liberal Democrats	Tom Gordon
Harrow East								Conservative	Bob Blackman
Harrow West								Labour	Gareth Thomas
Hartlepool								Labour	Jonathan Brash
Harwich and North Essex								Conservative	Bernard Jenkin
Hastings and Rye								Labour	Helena Dollimore
Havant								Conservative	Alan Mak
Hayes and Harlington								Labour	John McDonnell
Hazel Grove			Lisa Smart					Liberal Democrats	Lisa Smart
Hemel Hempstead								Labour	David Taylor
Hendon		Ameet Jogia						Labour	David Pinto-Duschinsky
Henley and Thame			Freddie Van Mierlo					Liberal Democrats	Freddie Van Mierlo
Hereford and South Herefordshire								Conservative	Jesse Norman
Herne Bay and Sandwich								Conservative	Roger Gale
Hertford and Stortford								Labour	Josh Dean
Hertsmere								Conservative	Oliver Dowden
Hexham								Labour	Joe Morris
Heywood and Middleton North								Labour	Elsie Blundell
High Peak								Labour	Jon Pearce
Hinckley and Bosworth			Michael Mullaney					Conservative	Luke Evans
Hitchin								Labour	Alistair Strathern
Holborn and St Pancras								Labour	Sagal Abdi-Wali
Honiton and Sidmouth			Richard Foord					Liberal Democrats	Richard Foord
Hornchurch and Upminster								Conservative	Julia Lopez
Hornsey and Friern Barnet								Labour	Catherine West
Horsham								Liberal Democrats	John Milne
Houghton and Sunderland South								Labour	Bridget Phillipson
Hove and Portslade								Labour	Peter Kyle
Huddersfield								Labour	Harpreet Uppal
Huntingdon								Conservative	Ben Obese-Jecty
Hyndburn								Labour	Sarah Smith
Ilford North								Labour	Wes Streeting
Ilford South								Labour	Jas Athwal
Ipswich								Labour	Jack Abbott
Isle of Wight East								Conservative	Joe Robertson
Isle of Wight West								Labour	Richard Quigley
Islington North								Your Party	Jeremy Corbyn
Islington South and Finsbury								Labour	Emily Thornberry
Jarrow and Gateshead East								Labour	Kate Osborne
Keighley and Ilkley								Conservative	Robbie Moore
Kenilworth and Southam			Louis Adam					Conservative	Jeremy Wright
Kensington and Bayswater		Felicity Buchan						Labour	Joe Powell
Kettering		Philip Hollobone						Labour	Rosie Wrighting
Kingston and Surbiton								Liberal Democrats	Ed Davey
Kingston upon Hull East								Independent	Karl Turner
Kingston upon Hull North and Cottingham								Labour	Diana Johnson
Kingston upon Hull West and Haltemprice								Labour	Emma Hardy
Kingswinford and South Staffordshire								Conservative	Mike Wood
Knowsley								Labour	Anneliese Midgley
Lancaster and Wyre								Labour	Cat Smith
Leeds Central and Headingley								Labour	Alex Sobel
Leeds East								Labour	Richard Burgon
Leeds North East								Labour	Fabian Hamilton
Leeds North West			Michael Fox					Labour	Katie White
Leeds South								Labour	Hilary Benn
Leeds South West and Morley								Labour	Mark Sewards
Leeds West and Pudsey								Labour	Rachel Reeves
Leicester East								Conservative	Shivani Raja
Leicester South								Independent Alliance	Shockat Adam
Leicester West								Labour	Liz Kendall
Leigh and Atherton								Labour	Jo Platt
Lewes								Liberal Democrats	James MacCleary
Lewisham East								Labour	Janet Daby
Lewisham North								Labour	Vicky Foxcroft
Lewisham West and East Dulwich								Labour	Ellie Reeves
Leyton and Wanstead								Labour	Calvin Bailey
Lichfield		Doug Pullen						Labour	Dave Robertson
Lincoln								Labour	Hamish Falconer
Liverpool Garston								Labour	Maria Eagle
Liverpool Riverside								Labour	Kim Johnson
Liverpool Walton								Labour	Dan Carden
Liverpool Wavertree								Labour	Paula Barker
Liverpool West Derby								Labour	Ian Byrne
Loughborough								Labour	Jeevun Sandher
Louth and Horncastle								Conservative	Victoria Atkins
Lowestoft								Labour	Jessica Asato
Luton North								Labour	Sarah Owen
Luton South and South Bedfordshire								Labour	Rachel Hopkins
Macclesfield								Labour	Tim Roca
Maidenhead			Joshua Reynolds					Liberal Democrats	Joshua Reynolds
Maidstone and Malling		David Thompson	Michael Stephens					Conservative	Helen Grant
Makerfield								Labour	Andy Burnham
Maldon								Conservative	John Whittingdale
Manchester Central								Labour	Lucy Powell
Manchester Rusholme								Labour	Afzal Khan
Manchester Withington								Labour	Jeff Smith
Mansfield								Labour	Steve Yemm
Melksham and Devizes			Brian Mathew					Liberal Democrats	Brian Mathew
Melton and Syston		Edward Argar						Conservative	Edward Argar
Meriden and Solihull East								Conservative	Saqib Bhatti
Mid Bedfordshire								Conservative	Blake Stephenson
Mid Buckinghamshire			Anja Schaefer					Conservative	Greg Smith
Mid Cheshire								Labour	Andrew Cooper
Mid Derbyshire								Labour	Jonathan Davies
Mid Dorset and North Poole			Vikki Slade					Liberal Democrats	Vikki Slade
Mid Leicestershire								Conservative	Peter Bedford
Mid Norfolk								Conservative	George Freeman
Mid Sussex								Liberal Democrats	Alison Bennett
Middlesbrough South and East Cleveland								Labour	Luke Myer
Middlesbrough and Thornaby East								Labour	Andy McDonald
Milton Keynes Central								Labour	Emily Darlington
Milton Keynes North								Labour	Chris Curtis
Mitcham and Morden								Labour	Siobhain McDonagh
Morecambe and Lunesdale		David Morris						Labour	Lizzi Collinge
New Forest East								Conservative	Julian Lewis
New Forest West								Conservative	Desmond Swayne
Newark		Mark Spencer		Robert Jenrick				Reform	Robert Jenrick
Newbury			Lee Dillon					Liberal Democrats	Lee Dillon
Newcastle-under-Lyme								Labour	Adam Jogee
Newcastle upon Tyne Central and West								Labour	Chi Onwurah
Newcastle upon Tyne East and Wallsend								Labour	Mary Glindon
Newcastle upon Tyne North								Labour	Catherine McKinnell
Newton Abbot			Martin Wrigley					Liberal Democrats	Martin Wrigley
Newton Aycliffe and Spennymoor								Labour	Alan Strickland
Normanton and Hemsworth								Labour	Jon Trickett
North Bedfordshire								Conservative	Richard Fuller
North Cornwall			Ben Maguire					Liberal Democrats	Ben Maguire
North Cotswolds			Paul Hodgkinson					Conservative	Geoffrey Clifton-Brown
North Devon			Ian Roome					Liberal Democrats	Ian Roome
North Dorset			Gary Jackson					Conservative	Simon Hoare
North Durham								Labour	Luke Akehurst
North East Cambridgeshire								Conservative	Steve Barclay
North East Derbyshire								Labour	Louise Sandher-Jones
North East Hampshire			Alex Brewer					Liberal Democrats	Alex Brewer
North East Hertfordshire								Labour	Chris Hinchliff
North East Somerset and Hanham								Independent	Dan Norris
North Herefordshire								Green	Ellie Chowns
North Norfolk			Steffan Aquarone					Liberal Democrats	Steffan Aquarone
North Northumberland		Guy Renner-Thompson						Labour	David Smith
North Shropshire								Liberal Democrats	Helen Morgan
North Somerset			Janey Little					Labour	Sadik Al-Hassan
North Warwickshire and Bedworth								Labour	Rachel Taylor
North West Cambridgeshire								Labour	Sam Carling
North West Essex								Conservative	Kemi Badenoch
North West Hampshire								Conservative	Kit Malthouse
North West Leicestershire								Labour	Amanda Hack
North West Norfolk								Conservative	James Wild
Northampton North								Labour	Lucy Rigby
Northampton South								Labour	Mike Reader
Norwich North								Labour	Alice MacDonald
Norwich South								Labour	Clive Lewis
Nottingham East								Labour	Nadia Whittome
Nottingham North and Kimberley								Labour	Alex Norris
Nottingham South								Labour	Lilian Greenwood
Nuneaton								Labour	Jodie Gosling
Old Bexley and Sidcup								Conservative	Louie French
Oldham East and Saddleworth								Labour	Debbie Abrahams
Oldham West, Chadderton and Royton								Labour	Jim McMahon
Orpington								Conservative	Gareth Bacon
Ossett and Denby Dale								Labour	Jade Botterill
Oxford East								Labour	Anneliese Dodds
Oxford West and Abingdon								Liberal Democrats	Layla Moran
Peckham								Labour	Miatta Fahnbulleh
Pendle and Clitheroe								Labour	Jonathan Hinder
Penistone and Stocksbridge								Labour	Marie Tidball
Penrith and Solway								Labour	Markus Campbell-Savours
Peterborough								Labour	Andrew Pakes
Plymouth Moor View								Labour	Fred Thomas
Plymouth Sutton and Devonport								Labour	Luke Pollard
Pontefract, Castleford and Knottingley								Labour	Yvette Cooper
Poole		Carol Traves						Labour	Neil Duncan-Jordan
Poplar and Limehouse								Labour	Apsana Begum
Portsmouth North								Labour	Amanda Martin
Portsmouth South			Charlie Murphy					Labour	Stephen Morgan
Preston								Labour	Mark Hendrick
Putney								Labour	Fleur Anderson
Queen's Park and Maida Vale								Labour	Georgia Gould
Rawmarsh and Conisbrough								Labour	John Healey
Rayleigh and Wickford								Conservative	Mark Francois
Reading Central								Labour	Matt Rodda
Reading West and Mid Berkshire								Labour	Olivia Bailey
Redcar								Labour	Anna Turley
Redditch		Michael Prendergast						Labour	Chris Bloore
Reigate								Conservative	Rebecca Paul
Ribble Valley		James Daly						Labour	Maya Ellis
Richmond Park			Sarah Olney					Liberal Democrats	Sarah Olney
Richmond and Northallerton		Rishi Sunak					|	Conservative	Rishi Sunak
Rochdale								Labour	Paul Waugh
Rochester and Strood								Labour	Lauren Edwards
Romford								Reform	Andrew Rosindell
Romsey and Southampton North			Thomas Gravatt					Conservative	Caroline Nokes
Rossendale and Darwen								Labour	Andy MacNae
Rother Valley								Labour	Jake Richards
Rotherham								Labour	Sarah Champion
Rugby								Labour	John Slinger
Ruislip, Northwood and Pinner								Conservative	David Simmonds
Runcorn and Helsby								Reform	Sarah Pochin
Runnymede and Weybridge			Chelsea Whyte					Conservative	Ben Spencer
Rushcliffe								Labour	James Naish
Rutland and Stamford								Conservative	Alicia Kearns
Salford								Labour	Rebecca Long-Bailey
Salisbury			Victoria Charleston					Conservative	John Glen
Scarborough and Whitby								Labour	Alison Hume
Scunthorpe								Labour	Nic Dakin
Sefton Central								Labour	Bill Esterson
Selby								Labour	Keir Mather
Sevenoaks								Conservative	Laura Trott
Sheffield Brightside and Hillsborough								Labour	Gill Furniss
Sheffield Central								Labour	Abtisam Mohamed
Sheffield Hallam			Sophie Crossthorn					Labour	Olivia Blake
Sheffield Heeley								Labour	Louise Haigh
Sheffield South East								Labour	Clive Betts
Sherwood Forest								Labour	Michelle Welsh
Shipley								Labour	Anna Dixon
Shrewsbury								Labour	Julia Buckley
Sittingbourne and Sheppey								Labour	Kevin McKenna
Skipton and Ripon								Conservative	Julian Smith
Sleaford and North Hykeham								Conservative	Caroline Johnson
Slough								Labour	Tan Dhesi
Smethwick								Labour	Gurinder Josan
Solihull West and Shirley								Conservative	Neil Shastri-Hurst
South Basildon and East Thurrock								Independent	James McMurdock
South Cambridgeshire			Pippa Heylings					Liberal Democrats	Pippa Heylings
South Cotswolds			Roz Savage					Liberal Democrats	Roz Savage
South Derbyshire								Labour	Samantha Niblett
South Devon			Caroline Voaden					Liberal Democrats	Caroline Voaden
South Dorset			Ben Wilson					Labour	Lloyd Hatton
South East Cornwall								Labour	Anna Gelderd
South Holland and The Deepings								Conservative	John Hayes
South Leicestershire								Conservative	Alberto Costa
South Norfolk								Labour	Ben Goldsborough
South Northamptonshire			Stewart Tolley					Conservative	Sarah Bool
South Ribble								Labour	Paul Foster
South Shields								Labour	Emma Lewell
South Shropshire			Matthew Green					Conservative	Stuart Anderson
South Suffolk								Conservative	James Cartlidge
South West Devon		Rebecca Smith						Conservative	Rebecca Smith
South West Hertfordshire			Matt Sanders					Conservative	Gagan Mohindra
South West Norfolk						Stuart Pembery (Restore)		Labour	Terry Jermy
South West Wiltshire			Mel Jacob					Conservative	Andrew Murrison
Southampton Itchen								Labour	Darren Paffey
Southampton Test								Labour	Satvir Kaur
Southend East and Rochford								Independent	Bayo Alaba
Southend West and Leigh		Anna Firth						Labour	David Burton-Sampson
Southgate and Wood Green								Labour	Bambos Charalambous
Southport								Labour	Patrick Hurley
Spelthorne			Harry Boparai					Conservative	Lincoln Jopp
Spen Valley								Labour	Kim Leadbeater
St Albans			Daisy Cooper					Liberal Democrats	Daisy Cooper
St Austell and Newquay								Labour	Noah Law
St Helens North								Labour	David Baines
St Helens South and Whiston								Labour	Marie Rimmer
St Ives			Andrew George					Liberal Democrats	Andrew George
St Neots and Mid Cambridgeshire			Ian Sollom					Liberal Democrats	Ian Sollom
Stafford								Labour	Leigh Ingham
Staffordshire Moorlands								Conservative	Karen Bradley
Stalybridge and Hyde								Labour	Jonathan Reynolds
Stevenage								Labour	Kevin Bonavia
Stockport			Alice Delemare Tangpuori					Labour	Navendu Mishra
Stockton North								Labour	Chris McDonald
Stockton West								Conservative	Matt Vickers
Stoke-on-Trent Central								Labour	Gareth Snell
Stoke-on-Trent North								Labour	David Williams
Stoke-on-Trent South								Labour	Allison Gardner
Stone, Great Wyrley and Penkridge								Conservative	Gavin Williamson
Stourbridge								Labour	Cat Eccles
Stratford and Bow								Labour	Uma Kumaran
Stratford-on-Avon								Liberal Democrats	Manuela Perteghella
Streatham and Croydon North								Labour	Steve Reed
Stretford and Urmston								Labour	Andrew Western
Stroud								Labour	Simon Opher
Suffolk Coastal								Labour	Jenny Riddell-Carpenter
Sunderland Central								Labour	Lewis Atkinson
Surrey Heath			Al Pinkerton					Liberal Democrats	Al Pinkerton
Sussex Weald								Conservative	Nus Ghani
Sutton and Cheam								Liberal Democrats	Luke Taylor
Sutton Coldfield								Conservative	Andrew Mitchell
Swindon North								Labour	Will Stone
Swindon South								Labour	Heidi Alexander
Tamworth								Labour	Sarah Edwards
Tatton								Conservative	Esther McVey
Taunton and Wellington			Gideon Amos					Liberal Democrats	Gideon Amos
Telford								Labour	Shaun Davies
Tewkesbury								Independent	Cameron Thomas (Note: Elected for the Liberal Democrats)
The Wrekin								Conservative	Mark Pritchard
Thirsk and Malton								Conservative	Kevin Hollinrake
Thornbury and Yate			Claire Young					Liberal Democrats	Claire Young
Thurrock								Labour	Jen Craft
Tipton and Wednesbury								Labour	Antonia Bance
Tiverton and Minehead			Rachel Gilmour					Liberal Democrats	Rachel Gilmour
Tonbridge								Conservative	Tom Tugendhat
Tooting								Labour	Rosena Allin-Khan
Torbay			Steve Darling					Liberal Democrats	Steve Darling
Torridge and Tavistock			Phil Hutty					Conservative	Geoffrey Cox
Tottenham								Labour	David Lammy
Truro and Falmouth			Ruth Gripper					Labour	Jayne Kirkham
Tunbridge Wells			Mike Martin					Liberal Democrats	Mike Martin
Twickenham			Munira Wilson					Liberal Democrats	Munira Wilson
Tynemouth								Labour	Alan Campbell
Uxbridge and South Ruislip								Labour	Danny Beales
Vauxhall and Camberwell Green								Labour	Florence Eshalomi
Wakefield and Rothwell								Labour	Simon Lightwood
Wallasey								Labour	Angela Eagle
Walsall and Bloxwich								Labour	Valerie Vaz
Walthamstow								Labour	Stella Creasy
Warrington North								Labour	Charlotte Nichols
Warrington South								Labour	Sarah Hall
Warwick and Leamington								Labour	Matt Western
Washington and Gateshead South								Labour	Sharon Hodgson
Watford			Peter Taylor					Labour	Matt Turmaine
Waveney Valley								Green	Adrian Ramsay
Weald of Kent								Conservative	Katie Lam
Wellingborough and Rushden								Labour	Gen Kitchen
Wells and Mendip Hills								Liberal Democrats	Tessa Munt
Welwyn Hatfield								Labour	Andrew Lewin
West Bromwich								Labour	Sarah Coombes
West Dorset								Liberal Democrats	Edward Morello
West Ham and Beckton								Labour	James Asser
West Lancashire								Labour	Ashley Dalton
West Suffolk								Conservative	Nick Timothy
West Worcestershire			Dan Boatright-Greene					Conservative	Harriett Baldwin
Westmorland and Lonsdale			Tim Farron					Liberal Democrats	Tim Farron
Weston-super-Mare								Labour	Dan Aldridge
Wetherby and Easingwold								Conservative	Alec Shelbrooke
Whitehaven and Workington								Labour	Josh MacAlister
Widnes and Halewood								Labour	Derek Twigg
Wigan								Labour	Lisa Nandy
Wimbledon								Liberal Democrats	Paul Kohler
Winchester			Danny Chambers					Liberal Democrats	Danny Chambers
Windsor								Conservative	Jack Rankin
Wirral West								Labour	Matthew Patrick
Witham								Conservative	Priti Patel
Witney								Liberal Democrats	Charlie Maynard
Woking								Liberal Democrats	Will Forster
Wokingham			Clive Jones					Liberal Democrats	Clive Jones
Wolverhampton North East								Labour	Sureena Brackenridge
Wolverhampton South East								Labour	Pat McFadden
Wolverhampton West								Labour	Warinder Juss
Worcester			Mel Alcott					Labour	Tom Collins
Worsley and Eccles								Labour	Michael Wheeler
Worthing West								Labour	Beccy Cooper
Wycombe								Labour	Emma Reynolds
Wyre Forest		Mark Garnier						Conservative	Mark Garnier
Wythenshawe and Sale East								Labour	Mike Kane
Yeovil			Adam Dance					Liberal Democrats	Adam Dance
York Central								Labour	Rachael Maskell
York Outer			Andrew Hollyer					Labour	Luke Charters

=== Scotland ===
Constituency	Labour	SNP	Conservative	Liberal Democrats	Reform UK	Green Party	Others	Incumbent	
Aberdeen North								SNP	Kirsty Blackman
Aberdeen South								Con	Douglas Lumsden
Aberdeenshire North and Moray East								SNP	Seamus Logan
Airdrie and Shotts								Lab	Kenneth Stevenson
Alloa and Grangemouth								Lab	Brian Leishman
Angus and Perthshire Glens								SNP	Dave Doogan
Arbroath and Broughty Ferry								SNP	Lara Bird
Argyll, Bute and South Lochaber								SNP	Brendan O'Hara
Ayr, Carrick and Cumnock								Lab	Elaine Stewart
Bathgate and Linlithgow								Lab	Kirsteen Sullivan
Berwickshire, Roxburgh and Selkirk								Con	John Lamont
Caithness, Sutherland and Easter Ross								LD	Jamie Stone
Central Ayrshire								Lab	Alan Gemmell
Coatbridge and Bellshill								Lab	Frank McNally
Cowdenbeath and Kirkcaldy								Lab	Melanie Ward
Cumbernauld and Kirkintilloch								Lab	Katrina Murray
Dumfries and Galloway								Con	John Cooper
Dumfriesshire, Clydesdale and Tweeddale								Con	David Mundell
Dundee Central								SNP	Chris Law
Dunfermline and Dollar								Lab	Graeme Downie
East Kilbride and Strathaven								Lab	Joani Reid
East Renfrewshire								Lab	Blair McDougall
Edinburgh East and Musselburgh								Lab	Chris Murray
Edinburgh North and Leith								Lab	Tracy Gilbert
Edinburgh South								Lab	Ian Murray
Edinburgh South West								Lab	Scott Arthur
Edinburgh West								LD	Christine Jardine
Falkirk								Lab	Euan Stainbank
Glasgow East								Lab	John Grady
Glasgow North								Lab	Martin Rhodes
Glasgow North East								Lab	Maureen Burke
Glasgow South								Lab	Gordon McKee
Glasgow South West								Lab	Zubir Ahmed
Glasgow West								Lab	Patricia Ferguson
Glenrothes and Mid Fife								Lab	Richard Baker
Gordon and Buchan								Con	Harriet Cross
Hamilton and Clyde Valley								Lab	Imogen Walker
Inverclyde and Renfrewshire West								Lab	Martin McCluskey
Inverness, Skye and West Ross-shire								LD	Angus MacDonald
Kilmarnock and Loudoun								Lab	Lillian Jones
Livingston								Lab	Gregor Poynton
Lothian East								Lab	Douglas Alexander
Mid Dunbartonshire				Susan Murray				LD	Susan Murray
Midlothian								Lab	Kirsty McNeill
Moray West, Nairn and Strathspey								SNP	Graham Leadbitter
Motherwell, Wishaw and Carluke								Lab	Pamela Nash
Na h-Eileanan an Iar								Lab	Torcuil Crichton
North Ayrshire and Arran								Lab	Irene Campbell
North East Fife				Wendy Chamberlain				LD	Wendy Chamberlain
Orkney and Shetland								LD	Alistair Carmichael
Paisley and Renfrewshire North								Lab	Alison Taylor
Paisley and Renfrewshire South								Lab	Johanna Baxter
Perth and Kinross-shire								SNP	Pete Wishart
Rutherglen								Lab	Michael Shanks
Stirling and Strathallan								Lab	Chris Kane
West Aberdeenshire and Kincardine								Con	Andrew Bowie
West Dunbartonshire								Lab	Douglas McAllister

=== Wales ===
Constituency	Labour	Plaid Cymru	Conservative	Liberal Democrats	Reform UK	Green Party	Others	Incumbent	
Aberafan Maesteg								Labour	Stephen Kinnock
Alyn and Deeside								Labour	Mark Tami
Bangor Aberconwy								Labour	Claire Hughes
Blaenau Gwent and Rhymney								Labour	Nick Smith
Brecon, Radnor and Cwm Tawe				David Chadwick				Liberal Democrats	David Chadwick
Bridgend								Labour	Chris Elmore
Caerfyrddin								Plaid Cymru	Ann Davies
Caerphilly								Labour	Chris Evans
Cardiff East				Rodney Berman				Labour	Jo Stevens
Cardiff North				Joseph Carter				Labour	Anna McMorrin
Cardiff South and Penarth								Labour	Stephen Doughty
Cardiff West								Labour	Alex Barros-Curtis
Ceredigion Preseli								Plaid Cymru	Ben Lake
Clwyd East								Labour	Becky Gittins
Clwyd North								Labour	Gill German
Dwyfor Meirionnydd								Plaid Cymru	Liz Saville Roberts
Gower								Labour	Tonia Antoniazzi
Llanelli								Labour	Nia Griffith
Merthyr Tydfil and Aberdare								Labour	Gerald Jones
Mid and South Pembrokeshire								Labour	Henry Tufnell
Monmouthshire								Labour	Catherine Fookes
Montgomeryshire and Glyndŵr								Labour	Steve Witherden
Neath and Swansea East								Labour	Carolyn Harris
Newport East								Labour	Jessica Morden
Newport West and Islwyn								Labour	Ruth Jones
Pontypridd								Labour	Alex Davies-Jones
Rhondda and Ogmore								Labour	Chris Bryant
Swansea West								Labour	Torsten Bell
Torfaen								Labour	Nick Thomas-Symonds
Vale of Glamorgan								Labour	Kanishka Narayan
Wrexham								Labour	Andrew Ranger
Ynys Môn								Plaid Cymru	Llinos Medi
