= Islamophobia in the British Labour Party =

Issues regarding Islamophobia and anti-Muslim racism within the Labour Party have been the subject of controversy.

== Reports by the Labour Muslim Network ==
In November 2020, the Labour Muslim Network (LMN) published the Islamophobia and the Muslim Experience report into prejudice within the Labour Party, which reported that half of Muslim members said that they did not trust Keir Starmer or the party leadership to address Islamophobia, 29% had directly experienced Islamophobia in the party, and that 56% did not believe that Keir Starmer represented the Muslim community.

In March 2022, the LMN published a follow up report stating that the issues had gotten worse, specifically referencing the hierarchy of racism that had developed in the party. The second report found that 59% of Muslim members thought the party's handling of Islamophobia since the first report had been either bad (19%) or very bad (40%), and that 63% of people believed Labour did not represent the Muslim community.

== Forde report ==
The Forde Report was written by lawyer Martin Forde in response to a leaked dossier about the Labour Party's response to the Equality and Human Rights Commission's investigation into the party's handling of antisemitism. Released on 19 July 2022, the report said that the party failed to tackle Islamophobia, which had resulted in staff members leaving the party. The report called for Labour to address concerns about antisemitism and Islamophobia through a "broader ethical anti-racism training programme". In response to the report, the LMN said that the report suggested Labour had "institutional Islamophobia".

== The Labour Files ==
Al Jazeera's Investigative Unit published their 3-part documentary The Labour Files on the inner workings of the Labour Party. The producers claimed it was the 'biggest leak of confidential documents in British political history'. This documentary series gave evidence to allege that reports of Islamophobia were not dealt with, as well as detailing the abuse faced by some Muslim members of the party, including Apsana Begum.

== Gaza war ==
The Gaza war was something that bought about much controversy in the Labour party, and led to the resignation from the party of several Muslim councillors. In the initial days following the Israeli response to the October 7 attacks, Keir Starmer had said in an interview with LBC radio that Israel “has the right” to withhold power and water from Gaza, though he later said he did not intend to say this and said he supported humanitarian aid getting into Gaza. In the aftermath of these comments, several Muslim Labour councillors criticised the leadership, and several resigned from the party. Further backlash followed after an anonymous senior Labour source was quoted as saying the resignations amounted to "shaking off the fleas”.

Shabana Mahmood, Louise Haigh and Wes Streeting spoke up during a meeting of the Shadow Cabinet to warn that Labour risked appearing callous and of losing Muslim votes over the Gaza war. Mahmood, at the time Labour's highest-profile Muslim MP, told Starmer his stance had caused huge offence in the Muslim community. Haigh said Labour leaders needed to express an emotional connection with Palestinians who were suffering. Streeting, one of Starmer's closest frontbench allies, talked about fear among Muslims of an Islamophobic backlash. The day after the meeting, Starmer wrote a letter to Labour councillors attempting to address their concerns about the conflict and Labour's response to it. The letter made no mention of Starmer's comments made in the LBC interview, resulting in a councillor describing the letter as gaslighting.

In January 2024, Labour suspended Kate Osamor for allegedly making anti-Semitic comments about Israel during the Gaza war. Osamor had written that there was an "international duty" to remember the victims of The Holocaust and that "more recent genocides in Cambodia, Rwanda, Bosnia and now Gaza" should also be remembered.

=== 2024 local elections ===
The BBC's analysis of the 2024 local election results suggested that Labour vote share had fallen 21 percentage points in council wards where more than 20% of residents are Muslim. Similar analysis by Number Cruncher Politics found that Labour lost 33 percentage points in majority-Muslim areas. Following the elections, in response to a decline in Muslim votes for Labour, an anonymous Labour source stated "It's the Middle East, not West Midlands that will have won [Andy] Street the Mayoralty. Once again Hamas are the real villains". The statement was criticised by some, including the Labour Party, for being racist but Labour refused to name the source.

=== 2024 general election ===
The 2024 general election oversaw a landslide of 411 Labour Party candidates elected, but with a record low 34% of the vote share. Three of the new independents—Ayoub Khan, Adnan Hussain, and Shockat Adam, defeated Labour incumbent MPs. Iqbal Mohamed was elected to the new constituency of Dewsbury and Batley, the predecessor of which voted Labour in 2019. In Islington North, Jeremy Corbyn, a prominent activist for Palestinian rights, defeated the Labour candidate with a majority of 7,247.

There were other independent candidates who won a substantial proportion of the vote in areas with a high Muslim population. For example, Wes Streeting retained his Ilford North constituency by a margin of only 528 votes following a challenge by independent British-Palestinian candidate Leanne Mohamad, and Jess Phillips retained her Birmingham Yardley constituency by a margin of 693 votes. These results were suggested to be in part a push-back against Labour's stance on the Gaza war, Gaza humanitarian crisis and issues regarding Labour's Islamophobia.

== See also ==
- Antisemitism in the British Labour Party
- Antisemitism in the British Conservative Party
- Islamophobia in the British Conservative Party
- Islamophobia in the United Kingdom
