= Independent Alliance (UK) =

Alliance of independent MPs in the United Kingdom

- Founders: Shockat Adam; Jeremy Corbyn; Adnan Hussain; Ayoub Khan; Iqbal Mohamed
- Founded: 2 September 2024; 2 years ago
- House of Commons: 4 / 650 (Note: Two MPs of the Independent Alliance, Shockat Adam, and Ayoub Khan, are members of Your Party, but sit as independents in Parliament.)

The Independent Alliance is a grouping of four independent members of Parliament (MPs) in the House of Commons of the United Kingdom. The group was created partly to gain more speaking time in Parliament, and opposes austerity, the two-child benefit cap, the sale of arms to Israel, the abolition of the Winter Fuel Payment for most pensioners, and restricting eligibility for Personal Independence Payments (PIP).

At four MPs, the Independent Alliance is the seventh-equal largest grouping in the House of Commons, tied with Plaid Cymru. Although the group is not a political party, two of its four members support Your Party, which was founded by MPs Jeremy Corbyn and Zarah Sultana in July 2025.

== History ==
=== Background ===
In the 2024 general election, the Labour Party won a landslide victory, but a record six independent candidates were also elected. Three of the new independents—Ayoub Khan, Adnan Hussain and Shockat Adam—defeated the Labour incumbent MPs. Iqbal Mohamed was elected to the new constituency of Dewsbury and Batley, which was created from abolished constituencies contested at the previous general election in 2019: Dewsbury had elected a Conservative MP while Batley and Spen elected a Labour member. The results were suggested to be, in part, a push-back against Labour's stance on the Gaza war, the Gaza humanitarian crisis, and issues regarding Islamophobia in the Labour Party.

In Islington North, Jeremy Corbyn, the incumbent MP since 1983, had been forbidden from standing as a Labour parliamentary candidate by the Labour Party's National Executive Committee despite "unanimous support" from his Constituency Labour Party (CLP). After announcing on 24 May 2024 that he would stand as an independent candidate, he was fully expelled from the Labour Party. Corbyn was comfortably re-elected against the Labour candidate with a majority of 7,247.

On 23 July 2024, the Scottish National Party (SNP) tabled an amendment to the King's speech to scrap the two-child benefit cap. Labour whipped its MPs to vote against the SNP amendment, resulting in the amendment being rejected by 363 no votes to 103 ayes. Despite the whip, seven Labour MPs rebelled by voting to abolish the cap and were suspended from the party for at least six months. The seven Labour MPs suspended were John McDonnell, Richard Burgon, Ian Byrne, Rebecca Long-Bailey, Imran Hussain, Apsana Begum and Zarah Sultana.

Shortly after, Shockat Adam, Jeremy Corbyn, Adnan Hussain, Ayoub Khan, and Iqbal Mohamed produced a joint letter decrying the two major parties and stated the need for a caring alternative. Corbyn also stated that he was disappointed with Labour's actions, but dismissed the idea of forming a new political party as being premature. Instead, Corbyn and Adam said they would continue working with Ayoub Khan, Adnan Hussain and Iqbal Mohamed. The five informally worked together with the Greens in tabling motions, and reached out to cooperate with the seven suspended Labour MPs.

By 28 July 2024, Adam, Hussain, Khan and Mohamed were being advised by James Giles, who had previously worked as George Galloway's campaign manager.

=== Formation and activities ===
On 2 September 2024, Shockat Adam, Jeremy Corbyn, Adnan Hussain, Ayoub Khan and Iqbal Mohamed announced the formation of the Independent Alliance. The MPs stated they had formed the group so that they would be allocated parliamentary time to ask questions and speak in debates. While the seven suspended Labour MPs were not founding members, the Independent Alliance's MPs said they would welcome other MPs who share their principles.

During the launch of her campaign to become leader of the Conservative Party, Kemi Badenoch alleged the MPs had been elected due to "sectarian Islamist politics" and said the group was more worrying than the rise of the right-wing Reform UK. In a joint statement, the five MPs of the alliance condemned the comments as dangerous and Islamophobic, particularly in the aftermath of the 2024 United Kingdom riots. Ayoub Khan attributed death threats and harassment targeted at him to Badenoch's comments.

In October, Shockat Adam introduced a private members bill seeking official UK recognition of the State of Palestine. Co-sponsoring MPs included the four other members of the Independent Alliance, as well as Siân Berry of the Green Party, Stephen Gethins and Brendan O'Hara of the SNP, Liz Saville Roberts of Plaid Cymru, the suspended Labour member Ian Byrne and the sitting Labour member Kim Johnson. The creation of the Independent Alliance raised questions on the status of independent Members of Parliament and in December, the Procedure Committee of the House of Commons launched an inquiry on independent MPs. Although the inquiry will mostly deal with the status of parliamentary groupings by independent MPs, it will consider the status of MPs who have had the whip suspended too.

=== Towards a new party ===
In December 2024, The Spectator claimed that the Independent Alliance was likely to form a political party in 2025. According to The Spectator, Adam, Khan and Hussain were in favour of the creation of a political party to build a momentum but Corbyn was more hesitant. MP Zarah Sultana, who had been elected as a Labour Party candidate but had had the whip suspended, announced in early July 2025 that she was leaving Labour and planned to create a new political party with Corbyn and other independents. Mohamed supported her comments on social media. Corbyn confirmed there were ongoing discussions around forming a new party based around the Independent Alliance members. Corbyn and Sultana launched a new party going by the interim name of Your Party on 24 July 2025, with the support of the other members of the Independent Alliance. Sultana joined the Independent Alliance. However, by November 2025, it was reported the other MPs no longer considered her a member while two other members of the Alliance, Hussain and Mohamed, had withdrawn their support for Your Party. At the Your Party founding conference in November 2025, members voted to make the name permanent.

== Policy aims ==
In their first statement, the MPs of the Independent Alliance declared:

Millions of people are crying out for a real alternative to austerity, inequality and war – and their voices deserve to be heard. As individuals we were voted by our constituents to represent their concerns in parliament on these matters, and more, and we believe that as a collective group we can carry on doing this with greater effect.

The group's MPs call for an end to austerity policies as well as the two-child benefit cap. The group's MPs also advocated against the abolition of the winter fuel allowance, and proposals to limit eligibility for Personal Independence Payments (PIP). In regards to the Israeli–Palestinian conflict and the ongoing Israeli invasion of the Gaza Strip, the MPs of the group call for a total arms embargo on Israel, an end to Israeli settlements, and immediate recognition of the State of Palestine.

== Members of Parliament ==
=== Current members ===
Shockat Adam and Ayoub Khan are members of Your Party.

Name	Portrait	Constituency	First elected	Joined
Shockat Adam		Leicester South	4 July 2024	2 September 2024
Adnan Hussain		Blackburn	4 July 2024	2 September 2024
Iqbal Mohamed		Dewsbury and Batley	4 July 2024	2 September 2024
Ayoub Khan		Birmingham Perry Barr	4 July 2024	2 September 2024

=== Former members ===
Name	Portrait	Constituency	First elected	Joined	Left	Current party
Jeremy Corbyn		Islington North	9 June 1983	2 September 2024	10 June 2026	Your Party
Zarah Sultana		Coventry South	12 December 2019	24 July 2025	18 September 2025	Your Party

== See also ==
- 2024 suspension of rebel Labour MPs
- List of minor party and independent MPs elected in the United Kingdom
- Change UK
- The Independents (UK)
- The Muslim Vote
