= 2024 suspension of rebel Labour MPs =

UK political controversy

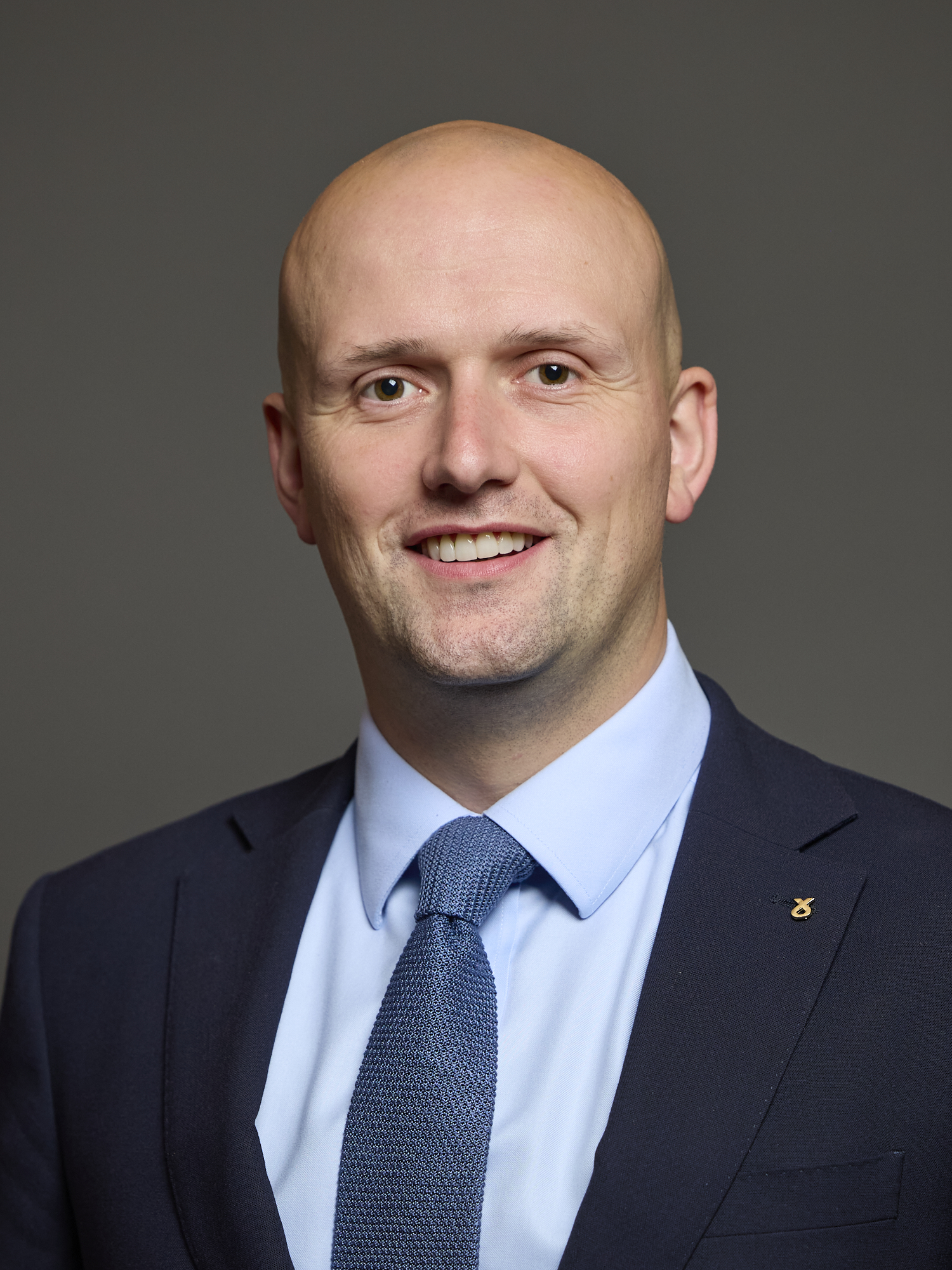
Stephen Flynn, who supported an amendment by the SNP to scrap the two child benefit cap, leading to Labour withdrawing the whip from 7 of its MPs who had supported it

On 23 July 2024, the British Labour Party withdrew the whip from seven of its MPs who had supported an amendment tabled by the Scottish National Party Westminster leader Stephen Flynn to scrap the two child benefit cap. MPs rejected the SNP amendment by 363 votes to 103.

The seven Labour MPs suspended for six months were John McDonnell, Richard Burgon, Ian Byrne, Rebecca Long-Bailey, Imran Hussain, Apsana Begum and Zarah Sultana, who subsequently sat as independents but remained members of the Labour Party. In early 2025 Burgon, Byrne, Long-Bailey and Hussain's suspensions were ended and they re-joined the Parliamentary Labour Party. McDonnell and Begum's suspensions were subsequently ended in September 2025. Sultana left Labour in July 2025 to co-found Your Party with the former Labour leader Jeremy Corbyn.

== Background ==
The benefit cap is a UK welfare policy that limits the amount in state benefits that an individual household can claim per year. It was introduced by the Cameron–Clegg coalition government in 2013 as part of the coalition government's wide-reaching welfare reform agenda which included the introduction of Universal Credit and reforms of housing benefit and disability benefits. The government cited wide public support for the measure, despite it being highly controversial. The benefit cap primarily affects families with children, high rents, or both. By 2024, two-thirds of the families affected by the cap were single-parent families, half of which had a child under five.

A two-child policy restricting child tax credit and universal credit was introduced in 2017. It limits these benefits to the first two children in most households, and is referred to as the "two-child benefit cap". These two benefit caps form part of a set of three benefits policies designed by the then Chancellor of the Exchequer, George Osborne, as part of the United Kingdom government austerity programme. The third policy, introduced in 2013, was known as the bedroom tax.

Keir Starmer and Rachel Reeves have refused to scrap the benefit cap since entering government, citing financial reasons. Starmer has, however, launched a Child Poverty Taskforce, in which expert officials from across government would work together on how best to support more than four-million children living in poverty.

== Amendment ==
On 23 July 2024, Labour withdrew the whip from 7 of its MPs who had supported an amendment tabled by the Scottish National Party (SNP)'s Westminster leader Stephen Flynn to scrap it, with Flynn stating that scrapping the cap would immediately raise 300,000 children out of poverty. MPs rejected the SNP amendment by 363 votes to 103.

The seven Labour MPs suspended for six months were John McDonnell, Richard Burgon, Ian Byrne, Rebecca Long-Bailey, Imran Hussain, Apsana Begum and Zarah Sultana, all of whom subsequently sat as independents. In early 2025, after six months had elapsed, Burgon, Byrne, Long-Bailey and Hussain had the whip restored and were re-admitted to the Labour parliamentary group, whilst McDonnell, Begum and Sultana remained suspended after continuing to criticise government policy during that period.

In July 2025, Sultana announced that she would be leaving Labour to co-found a new party alongside former Labour leader Jeremy Corbyn. McDonnell, Byrne and fellow left-wing Labour MP Kim Johnson expressed regret that Sultana felt unable to continue within the Labour Party. In September 2025, following the appointment of Jonathan Reynolds as Chief Whip of the Labour Party in a cabinet reshuffle, the whip was restored to McDonnell and Begum: afterwards the latter stated that she would continue to oppose the two child benefit cap.

== See also ==
- Labour MPs suspended in July 2025:
  - Rachael Maskell
  - Neil Duncan-Jordan
  - Brian Leishman
  - Chris Hinchliff
  - Diane Abbott
- Independent Alliance (UK)
