= The work of the Labour Party's Governance and Legal Unit in relation to antisemitism, 2014–2019 =

British Labour Party dossier

"The work of the Labour Party's Governance and Legal Unit in relation to antisemitism, 2014–2019", is a leaked British dossier written by party staff in response to the Equality and Human Rights Commission's investigation into the party's handling of antisemitism complaints. The report includes emails of senior party staff, aligned with the right of the party, and suggests factionalism within the party ultimately led to antisemitism and racism allegations not being dealt with properly.

The dossier was first reported by Tom Rayner, political correspondent at Sky News, on 11 April 2020. He reported that Labour's lawyers had advised against submitting the report to the commission. The dossier was subsequently leaked on social media. Keir Starmer, Leader of the Labour Party, and Angela Rayner, Deputy Leader of the Labour Party, announced an investigation into the report the following day. HOPE not hate welcomed the dossier's statement that it "thoroughly disproves any suggestion that antisemitism is not a problem in the Party", and also called on the party to investigate the racism it details against Diane Abbott. The dossier was criticised by the Campaign Against Antisemitism, which suggested it had been written to absolve the leadership of Jeremy Corbyn of failing to deal with antisemitism.

The resulting inquiry into the dossier, headed by Martin Forde KC, published its report on 19 July 2022. The Forde Report concluded that antisemitism had been used as a "factional weapon" by both opponents and supporters of Corbyn in the Labour Party, which impeded investigation into antisemitism complaints. It also supported the dossier's claims of racism and discrimination in the party more generally, suggesting there was a "hierarchy of racism", and made 165 recommendations to address the "toxic" culture within the party.

== Background ==
Jeremy Corbyn became leader of the Labour Party after winning the 2015 Labour Party leadership election. In May 2019, following complaints submitted by the Jewish Labour Movement and the Campaign Against Antisemitism, the Equality and Human Rights Commission (EHRC) launched a formal investigation into whether Labour had "unlawfully discriminated against, harassed or victimised people because they are Jewish", and specifically whether "unlawful acts have been committed by the party and/or its employees and/or its agents, and; whether the party has responded to complaints of unlawful acts in a lawful, efficient and effective manner." The Labour Party asked the EHRC to communicate any interim recommendations in the course of the investigation. To support the party's submission to the EHRC investigation, Labour's Governance and Legal Unit, which handles disciplinary cases, conducted its own investigations. The evidence compiled from these investigations formed "The work of the Labour Party's Governance and Legal Unit in relation to antisemitism, 2014–2019", but was ultimately not submitted to the EHRC.

== Leak ==
On 4 April 2020, Keir Starmer, who had just won the 2020 Labour leadership election, said he would look to cooperate fully with the EHRC's investigation into antisemitism in the party. The following week, Sky News reported that an 860-page report into the handling of antisemitism by the party, planned to be sent to the EHRC in addition to previous submissions, would be withheld on the advice of lawyers. Thomas Gardiner, head of Governance and Legal at the time of the internal investigations, said the report should not be shared because evidence such as private messages and emails had been obtained improperly, and was "presented selectively" and without context "to give a misleading picture". The dossier was subsequently leaked on social media.

== Findings ==
The report concluded that there was "no evidence that antisemitism complaints were treated any differently than other forms of complaint", or of current or former staff being "motivated by antisemitic intent". The report also found that Jeremy Corbyn's leadership staff inherited a lack of "robust processes, systems, training, education and effective line management", and that former senior officials opposed to Corbyn's leadership contributed to "a litany of mistakes", which "affected the expeditious and resolute handling of disciplinary complaints", including providing "false and misleading information" to Corbyn's office on the scale and handling of antisemitism allegations. In the period between November 2016 and February 2018, the report claimed that more than 300 complaints were made into antisemitism, "at least half" of which warranted action, but only 34 led to investigations being initiated.

The Independent, which saw the report in full, stated that Labour Party officials appeared disappointed by Labour's better-than-expected performance in the 2017 general election. The report also urged the EHRC to "question the validity of the personal testimonies" of former members of staff.

=== Scale of antisemitism ===
The report's executive summary stated:

This report thoroughly disproves any suggestion that antisemitism is not a problem in the party, or that it is all a smear or a witch-hunt. The report's findings prove the scale of the problem and could help end the denialism amongst parts of the party membership which has further hurt Jewish members and the Jewish community."

The report also named complainants in antisemitism cases, and identified complainants as being Jewish, even where they had not sought to self-identify as such originally.

=== Factionalism and discrimination ===
The report included hundreds of private WhatsApp messages and emails from Labour staff members, many of them expressing hostility towards Corbyn or his close allies and unhappiness at Labour's better-than-expected performance at the 2017 general election. The officials discussed directing election campaign funds to favoured candidates, including the former deputy leader Tom Watson.

The report lists examples of staff members who were opposed to Corbyn using insulting and aggressive language towards Labour politicians, other staff, and party members, including terms like "trots" and "bitch face cow". The report says these staff members repeatedly used derogatory tropes associated with mental health, and repeatedly disparaged the appearance of party staff and members, using terms like "pube head", "smelly cow", and "fat". The report also included comments made that certain party members should "die in a fire", and that a senior aide's "face would make a good dartboard". According to the report, one message said that Labour MPs who nominated Corbyn should be "taken out and shot". The report included communications attacking Labour politicians including Ed Miliband, Sadiq Khan, Dawn Butler, Diane Abbott, Rachael Maskell, Clive Lewis, and Corbyn. Abbott was reportedly described as "truly repulsive" and "a very angry woman", while the complaints of racism experienced within the party by fellow black Labour MP Butler were said to have been dismissed. There was also one instance of a staffer in the policy unit sharing an Islamophobic clip from right-wing commentator Douglas Murray in the aftermath of the 2017 Westminster attack. The report also documents talk of violence against Corbyn, talking about "hanging and burning" him, calling him a "lying little toerag", claiming "death by fire is too kind for LOTO [Leader of the Opposition]".

The report said that senior management told staff that they need not be comradely in their attitudes and statements about the leader. The report also suggests the management team co-ordinated in "refusing to share basic information to LOTO during the election", created a "parallel general election campaign", and boasted about "hardly working" during the campaign. The report included marked statements about their dismay at Labour over-performing expectations during the campaign, and apparent disappointment with the increase in seats after the election.

== Reaction ==
Many MPs, party members and activists within the Labour Party expressed dismay at the contents of the report and called for an investigation into the behaviour detailed within it, including "the possible misuse of funds" by officials. Labour politicians, such as Andy Burnham and Alex Sobel, spoke out against the emails and practices described in the report. Labour MP Charlotte Nichols said "this document should be published in full" and that "Jewish members have a right to know what has happened and to see the evidence". Sobel said, "To read the messages and emails that our own staff conspired to undermine our candidates and starve those in marginal seats of resources is a disgrace." He also condemned the "toxic internal culture" which had resulted in the mismanagement of complaints of antisemitism, Islamophobia, and sexual harassment.

Momentum called for a full inquiry into the report, including any misuse of funds. A submission by Corbyn and eight other colleagues to the Forde Report's inquiry said officials had sabotaged the party and suggested their diversion of funds could constitute fraud. The diverted funds were paid to the Bespoke Materials Service, sometimes referred to as the Ergon House Project, representing 1.2 per cent of Labour's total election expenditures. The funds were focused on certain Labour-held seats rather than offensive targets. Corbyn said:

I always knew that there was a culture in the Labour party that was not a healthy one, of an almost self-perpetuating bureaucracy. All organisations have a degree of self-perpetuating bureaucracy about them.

New Statesman political editor Stephen Bush and The Guardian political correspondent Peter Walker suggested the report gave no definitive proof of obstruction by Labour officials during the 2017 general election. The Campaign Against Antisemitism suggested the report had been written to absolve the Corbyn leadership of the failure to deal with antisemitism. Bush and HOPE not hate also raised concerns about the privacy and welfare of Jewish complainants named within an unredacted version of the report circulated on social media.

Len McCluskey, the general secretary of Unite the Union, said the report showed there was a "rancid, and very cruel, political culture", and said the former officials implicated to be suspended from the party. Matt Wrack, general secretary of the Fire Brigades Union (FBU), called for disciplinary action against the officials named in the report, and for "dealing swiftly with complaints of antisemitism and other forms of racism". He further said that obstruction by Labour Party staff had resulted in the 2017 electoral defeat. HOPE not hate welcomed the dossier's statement that it "thoroughly disproves any suggestion that antisemitism is not a problem in the Party", and also called on the party to investigate the racism it detailed against Diane Abbott.

BAME Labour members raised concerns over the treatment of black MPs described in the report, with hundreds signing open letters to the new leadership calling for internal party reform and increased transparency. Labour staffers tried to stop the party's Unite the Union branch from sending letters of solidarity to the BAME MPs named in the leaked report as victims of racism and racial profiling. Walker also highlighted the anti-Black racism and misogyny directed at Diane Abbott and said that "many BAME MPs and members want more than just words from Starmer about tackling toxic attitudes at Labour HQ".

== Forde Report ==
In response to the report's leak, Keir Starmer and Angela Rayner issued a joint statement:

"We have seen a copy of an apparently internal report about the work of the Labour Party's Governance and Legal Unit in relation to antisemitism. The content and the release of the report into the public domain raise a number of matters of serious concern. We will therefore commission an urgent independent investigation into this matter. This investigation will be instructed to look at three areas.

1. The background and circumstances in which the report was commissioned and the process involved.
2. The contents and wider culture and practices referred to in the report.
3. Third, the circumstances in which the report was put into the public domain.

We have also asked for immediate sight of any legal advice the Labour Party has already received about the report. In the meantime, we ask everyone concerned to refrain from drawing conclusions before the investigation is complete and we will be asking the GS to put measures in place to protect the welfare of party members and party staff who are concerned or affected by this report."

John McDonnell, former Shadow Chancellor of the Exchequer, called for the immediate suspension of some former staff named in the document, pending the results of the independent investigation, and for the document to be provided to the EHRC investigation into the party. He said: "They've got to have access to all of the information. We've got to rid ourselves of this culture that prevented a Labour government when we desperately needed one but also, by the looks of it, undermined the party's ability to deal with antisemitism effectively" and wrote that "the revelations in the leaked Labour report are a genuine scandal."

On 23 April, the National Executive Committee of the Labour Party (NEC) held a meeting via Zoom to agree the terms of reference for the independent investigation into the circumstances, contents, and release of an internal report to conclude with its own report being published by mid-July. Several amendments were passed by the NEC, including one moved by Rayner that referred to the offer of whistleblower protections. On 1 May, the NEC appointed a four-person panel to investigate the report on the party's handling of internal antisemitism complaints. Barrister Martin Forde was chosen by the NEC to chair the independent inquiry. He was supported by three Labour peers: Debbie Wilcox, Baroness Wilcox of Newport, a councillor and former leader of Newport City Council; Larry Whitty, Baron Whitty, a former Labour general secretary; and Ruth Lister, Baroness Lister of Burtersett, a social policy professor. Momentum chair and NEC member Jon Lansman proposed Alf Dubs, Baron Dubs, as a panel member because there was no Jewish representation. This was voted down in the meeting, including by Starmer, on the grounds that Dubs had supported Starmer's leadership bid; another NEC member also argued that Dubs was a higher-profile backer of Starmer, and an NEC member said that Baroness Wilcox backed Starmer's leadership campaign. Another factor considered was gender balance, particularly as the chair chosen is male. The vote on the proposal to include Dubs was lost 18–16; there was a request during the meeting for a new vote after one NEC member argued that Wilcox had supported both Starmer and Rosena Allin-Khan, liked tweets that attacked Corbyn and Unite the Union, and promoted the NEC's slate of Labour First.

In June 2020, Labour's press office provided a statement prepared by party lawyers to journalists covering the story that defended the comments, describing criticism as "po-faced", and stated: "These were messages exchanged between co-workers in the expectation that they would remain private and confidential and the tone of the language used reflects that." In response, 13 NEC members (one third of the NEC), including representatives from four trade unions (Transport Salaried Staffs' Association, Fire Brigades Union, Associated Society of Locomotive Engineers and Firemen, and Unite the Union) wrote to Starmer, accusing his office of misleading them about how the party dealt with leaked WhatsApp messages by senior officials detailed in the report and accusing party officials of defending "racist, sexist and abusive" messages about colleagues, and "also directly prejudged the specific issues that Martin Forde's inquiry is considering ... and thereby undermines its independence". The NEC members called for an apology and retraction from Starmer.

=== Findings ===
The Forde Report was released on 19 July 2022, concluding that antisemitism had been used as a "factional weapon" by opponents, and by supporters, of Corbyn in the Labour Party. The report said: "[R]ather than confront the paramount need to deal with the profoundly serious issue of anti-Semitism in the party, both factions treated it as a factional weapon." It also said that senior Labour staff displayed "deplorably factional and insensitive, and at times discriminatory, attitudes" towards Corbyn and his supporters, and suggested there was a "hierarchy of racism" in the party which ignored Black and Asian people.

Responding to this, Corbyn's former advisor Andrew Fisher wrote: "Forde confirms that reflection is necessary. Cultural change requires painstaking work, not glib assertions of change."

== See also ==
- Islamophobia in the British Labour Party
- Antisemitism in the British Conservative Party
- Antisemitism in the United Kingdom
- Islamophobia in the British Conservative Party
