= Ratta, Azad Kashmir =

Pakistani village

Ratta
- Location within Azad Kashmir
- Coordinates: 33.357°N 73.659°E
- Administering Country: Pakistan
- State: Azad Kashmir

Population
  - Estimate: 3,152
- Time zone: UTC+5 (PST)

Ratta is a village in Dadyal in the Mirpur District of Azad Kashmir. It is located 70 km (43 mi) east of Islamabad, Pakistan. Residents of Ratta sometimes add the word Ratvi to their surname. Ratta is one of the most prosperous villages in Azad Kashmir, with an overwhelming Raja population. Notable historic people who originate from here are Ch Simon Mohammed BSc (Hons), Raja Kala Khan, Ayoub Khan MP, Choudhary Yousaf & Raja Mohammed Younas Khan. In the 1400s, Dadyal did not exist as a town or a "tehsil" in the way we know it today. Instead, this century was the era of the Great Settlement, when the Chib Rajputs first arrived and established their rule over the region. If you could travel back to the Dadyal hills in the year 1450, here is what the world would have looked like: 1. The Arrival of the Chib Dynasty (c. 1400) Historical records (such as the Tawarikh-i-Rajputan) suggest that the Chib dynasty was founded right at the start of the 1400s.

* The Migration: Raja Chib Chand (a prince of the Katoch royal line from Kangra) migrated to the Bhimber hills.
* The Conquest: The area around Dadyal and Bhimber was then ruled by the Thakyal Rajputs. Chib Chand married the daughter of the Thakyal King, Raja Sripat, and eventually inherited or conquered the territory.
* The Naming of Chibhal: Because of this conquest in the 1400s, the entire region—from the Jhelum river to the Chenab—began to be called Chibhal (the land of the Chibs).

2. Dadyal: A Collection of Tribal Hamlets In the 1400s, "Dadyal" was likely a series of scattered hamlets (Bastis) belonging to different clans.

* The Landscape: It was a wild, heavily forested region. Agriculture was minimal, and the economy was based on cattle-rearing and small-scale farming in the Kandi (hilly) areas.
* Fortified Settlements: Villages were built on higher ground for defense against rival tribes. The "Dadyal" we know today grew out of these smaller 15th-century settlements as clans like the Rachyals, Kalyals, and Chibs began to clear the forests for land.

3. Political Status: The Khari Khariyali State During the 1400s, the Dadyal region fell under the jurisdiction of the Khari Khariyali state.

* Capital: The seat of power was at Mangla Fort.
* Independence: While the Delhi Sultanate (the Lodi dynasty) ruled the plains of India, the Chibhal hills remained largely independent. The local Rajas paid little to no tax to Delhi, living as sovereign warrior-kings in their mountain strongholds.

4. Religion: The Hindu Era It is important to remember that in the 1400s, the people of Dadyal—including the Chib Rajputs and the local Jats—were still Hindu.

* Faith: They worshipped ancestral deities and followed the customs of the Kangra hills.
* The Transition: The mass conversion to Islam did not happen until the late 1400s and early 1500s, starting with the conversion of Raja Bhoop Chand (later Raja Shadi Khan’s lineage) at the invitation of the Delhi Sultans or early Mughals.

5. Interaction with Neighbors

* The Jhelum River: The river was the lifeblood and the boundary. Across the river (in what is now Rawalpindi District), the Gakhars were the dominant power. The 1400s were marked by constant small-scale wars between the Chib Rajputs of Dadyal and the Gakhars for control of the river crossings.

Summary of the 1400s | Category | Status in the 1400s | |---|---| | Ruling Tribe | Chib Rajputs (Newly arrived from Kangra) | | Religion | Hindu (Shaivite and Ancestor worship) | | Governance | Independent Hill Chiefdoms (Khari Khariyali) | | Environment | Dense forests with small, fortified tribal villages |

The Era of the "Chibhal" Governors The 1600s saw the Chibs of Ratta and Bhimber firmly established as the Governors (Hakims) of the Chibhal territory. • Imperial Favour: Because Raja Shadi Khan (the first convert) had proven his loyalty, the Mughal court granted the Chib Rajas the right to collect revenue and maintain a standing army in the hills. • The "Ratta" Connection: Ratta served as a key residential and defensive pocket. While the main political capital was Bhimber, Ratta was where the "clansmen" lived—the warriors who would be called upon whenever the Mughal Emperor went on a campaign to Kabul or Kandahar. 2. The Golden Road (Mughal Travel) The 1600s were the years of the great Mughal processions to Kashmir. • The Route: Emperors like Jahangir (who loved Kashmir) and Shah Jahan (who built the Taj Mahal) traveled through the Bhimber-Rajouri axis. • Local Impact: While Ratta was slightly off the main "Imperial Road," the wealth from these royal processions trickled down. The Rajputs of Ratta provided security for the supply lines and horses for the royal stables. This brought significant gold and influence into the village. 3. Martial Culture: The Rise of the Cavalry In the 1600s, the Rajputs of Ratta were famous for their Cavalry (Horsemen). • Mansabdari System: The head of the Chib clan was often a "Mansabdar" of 1,000 or 1,500 horses. • The Warrior Life: A young man from Ratta in the 1600s would spend his winters in the village and his summers serving in the Mughal armies in distant lands like the Deccan (South India) or the Northwest Frontier. They were known for their skill with the Tegh (curved sword) and the Spear. 4. Religious and Social Life This was the century when the Islamic identity of Ratta began to take deep root, but it was a very "Rajput" version of Islam. • Sufi Centers: This is the era when local Pirs (Saints) began establishing small mosques and Madrasas in the Dadyal hills. • Tribal Law: Despite being Muslim, the Rajputs of Ratta still followed the "Reet" (Customary Law). Disputes were settled by the elders based on Rajput honor codes (Ghairat) rather than strict administrative law. 5. Conflict with the Gakhars The 1600s were not entirely peaceful. A massive rivalry existed between the Chib Rajputs and the Gakhars of Pothohar (Rawalpindi area). • Border Skirmishes: The Jhelum River was the border. Gakhar raiders often crossed over to raid the Dadyal subdivision. • Ratta as a Shield: Ratta, being one of the more populated and fortified villages near the river, acted as the "Shield of the Chibs." The warriors of Ratta were responsible for patrolling the riverbanks to prevent further Gakhar incursions. the Chib Rajas were so respected by the Mughals that they were allowed to use the "Nalki" (a type of royal palanquin/litter)? This was a privilege usually reserved only for princes of the blood While Ratta is a "Raja" village, many Jatt families from the neighboring areas have moved into Ratta over the last 50 years to be part of its commercial growth

== Demography ==
According to the Pakistan census of 1998, its population was 3,152.
