= Ayoub Khan =

British politician (born 1973)

Ayoub Khan MP
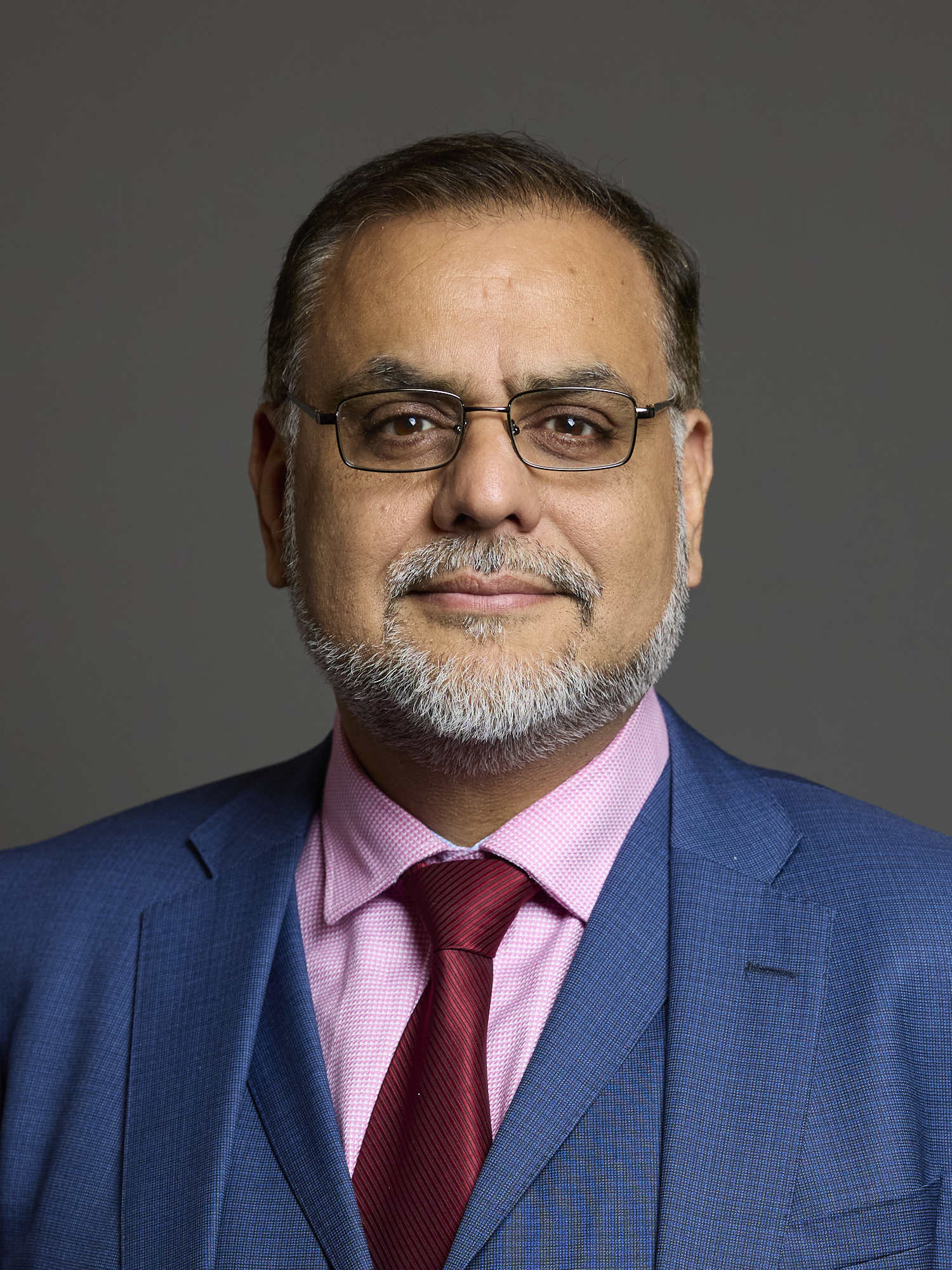
- Official portrait, 2024

Member of Parliament for Birmingham Perry Barr
- Incumbent
- Assumed office 4 July 2024
- Preceded by: Khalid Mahmood
- Majority: 507 (1.4%)

Member of Birmingham City Council for Aston
- In office 6 May 2022 – 7 May 2026
- In office July 2005 – May 2012
- In office May 2003 – June 2004

Personal details
- Born: May 1973 (age 53) Ratta, Azad Kashmir, Pakistan
- Party: Independent
- Other political affiliations: Liberal Democrats (until 2024); Independent Alliance (co-founder, 2024–present); Your Party (2025–present)
- Children: 6
- Education: University of Birmingham (BSc, MEng); Birmingham City University (LLB); BPP University (BVC)
- Website: ayoubkhan.org.uk

Ayoub Khan (born May 1973) is a British independent politician and barrister who has served as Member of Parliament (MP) for Birmingham Perry Barr since 2024. Khan served as a councillor for Aston on Birmingham City Council from 2003 to 2004, 2005 to 2012, and from 2022 to 2026, and has served as a cabinet member on the council.

A member of the Liberal Democrats until his resignation prior to the 2024 general election, since September 2024 he has been active in the Independent Alliance parliamentary group, with whose members he registered Your Party UK Limited in 2025.

== Early life and education ==
Born into a Mirpuri-speaking family as one of twelve children of steel worker Iqbal and Parveen, Ayoub Khan moved to England from Ratta, Azad Kashmir at six months old. He attended Prince Albert Primary School, Duddeston Manor Secondary School and Josiah Mason College. He graduated with a BSc in Chemistry from the University of Birmingham and a MEng in Integrated Management Systems from the University of Birmingham.

He worked as an IT consultant from 1999 to 2003. He studied Law at the University of Central England, completed his Bar Vocational Training Course at the BPP Law College London and qualified as a barrister in 2007 after being called to the bar in 2005. He is a member of Lincoln’s Inn.

== Political career ==
=== Councillor ===
Khan entered politics against the backdrop of the Iraq War. He was first elected as a Liberal Democrat councillor in the Aston ward in Birmingham Council in 2003. He lost the seat in 2004 but successfully challenged the result through an election petition at the High Court of Justice whose judge Richard Mawrey determined that the Labour Party candidates were involved in a postal voting scandal. He won the subsequent by-election in 2005. He represented the Aston ward again from 2005 to 2012. He served as the City Council's cabinet member for local services and community safety from 2007, becoming at the time its only non-white appointee.

In 2008, Khan alleged the use of underhanded tactics by Labour opponent Muhammad Afzal during the 2007 election. Khan subsequently won the 2008 election. In 2009, Afzal was cleared, and Khan was declared to have made unsubstantiated claims against Afzal by the election commissioner, Timothy Straker. The leader of Birmingham council's Labour group, Albert Bore, said that he should be barred from contesting the 2010 general election. Khan appealed the decision to the High Court of Justice, asserting that the judge's findings were "perverse" and "unsubstantiated"; Khan was unsuccessful in his appeal. Khan said that the judgement was "beyond [his] belief" and that he would fight to clear his name. Afzal reported Khan to the Bar Standards Board, who cleared Khan of wrongdoing. An internal Liberal Democrat investigation also cleared Khan of any wrongdoing, and he was retained as their prospective parliamentary candidate.

He contested the Birmingham Ladywood constituency at the 2010 general election, and came second to Labour's Shabana Mahmood.

Following the deaths of three young Muslim community patrollers during the 2011 riots in Birmingham, Khan praised the victims for "protecting the properties and sanctity of fellow community members be they black or white, Muslim or non-Muslim" and for fulfilling their "duties as proud British Muslims", and lauded the restraint of the Muslim youth in not seeking retribution.

Khan contested the West Midlands constituency at the 2014 European Parliament election, at which he was also not elected.

During the 2018 Birmingham Council election, Khan contested the election in his old ward of Aston, but was unsuccessful. In the 2022 Birmingham Council election Khan again stood in Aston, and was successful in being re-elected to the City Council. The win was in part attributed to a Gifting Scandal, which led to a high court case and the downfall of Labour Councillor Mohammad Afzal.

Following the outbreak of the Gaza war, Ayoub Khan and fellow Liberal Democrat councillor Izzy Knowles proposed a motion within the Birmingham City Council calling on the council to recognise the negative effects of the Israeli–Palestinian conflict; the increase in anti-Jewish and anti-Muslim hate; and to note the council's duty of care to the people of Birmingham, and to promote peace, tolerance and respect." The motion notably called for the council to support a Homes for Palestine Refugees programme inspired by the Homes for Ukraine programme.

Khan faced controversy after he created videos on TikTok saying that evidence of those killed or harmed in October 7 attacks should be publicly released and saying that Suella Braverman was misguided over her claims that the "from the river to the sea Palestine will be free" slogan is anti-Semitic. Some considered the posts anti-Semitic, while the Liberal Democrats conducted an investigation in relation to the posts and dismissed the complaints. Khan apologised to members of his community for any offence caused by the posts. Khan was offered antisemitism training by the Liberal Democrats but declined. Khan stated "at no stage have I considered my material on TikTok offensive. It illustrates, doesn’t it, how the media can get it wrong".

Khan presented a motion to Birmingham City Council proposing that private hire drivers be allowed to use bus lanes while on duty. He argued that private hire drivers provide essential services, such as transporting elderly vulnerable passengers to shopping centres or hospital appointments and young children with special needs to school, which happens often during peak travel times when congestion is at its highest. He suggested that allowing these drivers to use bus lanes would reduce congestion and emissions in the city and lead to faster journey times for passengers. This motion however failed.

=== Member of Parliament ===
In May 2024, a general election was called. A precondition of standing as a Liberal Democrat was that Khan would have been limited by the party when talking about the Gaza war. Instead, he resigned from the Liberal Democrats and stood as an independent candidate for the Birmingham Perry Barr constituency. In an interview preceding the election, he stated his belief that independent candidates across the country responded to a broad public desire for "a new form of politics", free from "the influence of big companies". During the election campaign, his wife suffered a brain injury in a fall, which resulted in Khan reducing his campaigning efforts to be with his wife. Khan said that it was eye-opening and provoked him to "double down efforts" with reducing NHS wait times. Ayoub Khan was elected as an independent MP for Perry Barr, with 35.5% of the vote, overturning the incumbent Labour MP Khalid Mahmood's 15,000 vote majority to win by 507 votes. Following his victory, he appointed George Galloway's campaign manager James Giles as his chief of staff.

Khan sponsored the independent–Green "Amendment B" to abolish the two-child benefit cap, and voted in support of the Scottish National Party's "Amendment D" to abolish the cap. Both amendments were voted down by the Labour Party. Shortly after the vote Ayoub Khan, Shockat Adam, Jeremy Corbyn, Adnan Hussain, and Iqbal Mohamed produced a joint letter decrying the two major parties and stating the need for a caring alternative. Adam and Corbyn had been in discussions with Khan, Hussain, and Mohamed regarding how to impact policy, with Adam stating that the five were "looking at options that would give us more access to the levers of power".

On 2 September 2024, Khan became a founding member of the Independent Alliance parliamentary group.

On 11 September 2024, as an MP, Khan tabled an early day motion in the parliament which expressed solidarity with drivers for Uber and other private hire services across the UK. It called on the government to implement measures to protect workers from exploitation, ensure fair pay and employment protections.

In February 2025, Khan tabled a motion to make a visa scheme for Palestinians with family ties in the United Kingdom. In April 2025, he was joined by Liberal Democrat councillors in calling for the armed forces to help remove uncollected rubbish from Birmingham streets at an early stage of the 2025 Birmingham bin strike, and charged that a decade of "financial mismanagement of Labour-run Birmingham city council" had provided "a damning indictment of Labour's inability to govern".

In July 2025, Khan voted against a motion that would decriminalise abortions that occur after 24 weeks of pregnancy.

On 31 July 2025, he took up the position of a director in the newly incorporated Your Party UK Limited alongside other members of the Independent Alliance.

== Positions ==
=== LGBT rights ===
In the past, when asked if he supported LGBT rights including marriage equality, Khan has stated that "My personal opinion as a Muslim is well known. You only have to look at what other Muslims believe, what's taught".

=== Aston Villa – Maccabi Tel Aviv football match ===
In October 2025, Khan supported the decision by West Midlands Police to ban Maccabi Tel Aviv fans from attending a forthcoming UEFA Europa League match against Aston Villa at Villa Park.

Khan said the decision to ban fans was a "moral question", not merely a matter of public safety.

=== Waada event in Birmingham ===
In June 2025, Khan was guest of honour at an event promoting Waada, a luxury housing project in Dubai. The two men behind Waada project are Malik Riaz and Ali Riaz Malik, a father-son duo who are wanted in Pakistan and banned from Britain owing to their involvement in Al-Qadir Trust case corruption and financial crime via their property company, Bahria Town.

=== Flydubai Flight 1073 ===
After the attempted takeover of Flydubai Flight 1073 in which the first officer stabbed the pilot and was thwarted in his attempt to crash the plane flying with more than 170 passengers from Dubai to Tel Aviv, Ayoub claimed that he "smelt a rat" and was unwilling to believe that the Israeli description of the events on the flight. In the House of Commons, Ian Austin insisted that Khan issue an apology for what he called a "disgraceful comment which appears to endorse crazy conspiracy theories that the Flydubai terror attack was somehow a false flag by Israel."

Parliament of the United Kingdom
Preceded by Khalid Mahmood	Member of Parliament for Birmingham Perry Barr; 2024–present	Incumbent
