= Your Party (UK) =

Political party

- Logo (Note: The red triangle typically appears on a cream background and next to or above text that says either "THIS IS YOUR PARTY" or just "YOUR PARTY".)
- Leader: Collective leadership
- Governing body: Central Executive Committee
- Parliamentary Leader: Jeremy Corbyn
- Chair: Jennifer Forbes
- Vice-chair: Laura Smith
- Founders: Jeremy Corbyn; Zarah Sultana among others
- Founded: 24 July 2025
- Registered: 30 September 2025; 13 months ago
- Headquarters: 89–93 Fonthill Road; London; N4 3JH
- Membership (December 2025): 55,000
- Ideology: Socialism
- Political position: Left-wing
- Colours: Red Cream; Peach (Customary) (Note: Used by BBC News in the 2026 English local elections)
- Slogan: This is Your Party (2025)
- House of Commons: 2 / 650 (Note: Two additional MPs, Shockat Adam, and Ayoub Khan, are members of Your Party, but sit as independents in Parliament.)
- Councillors: 11 / 18,645

Election symbol
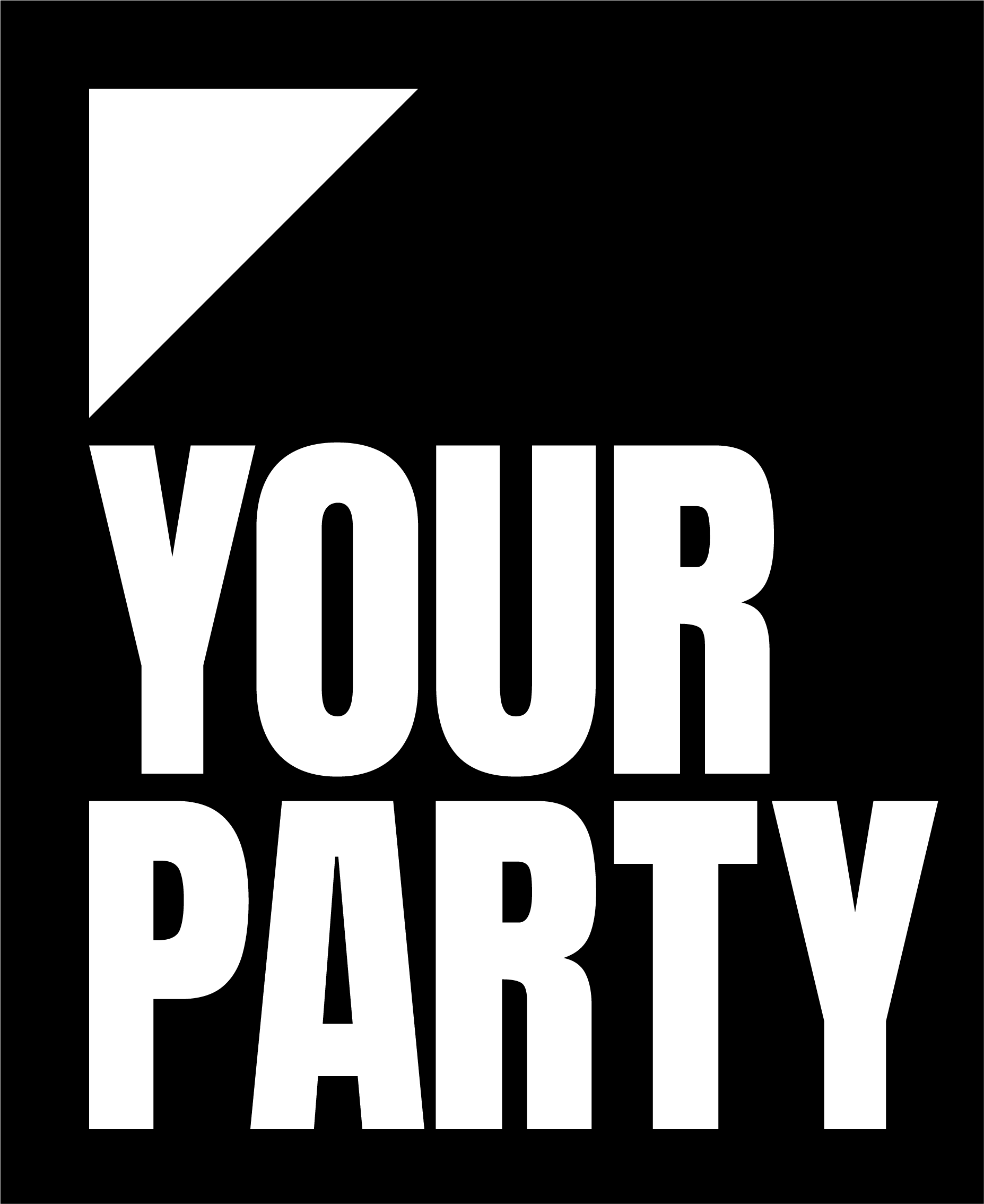

Website
- www.yourparty.uk

Your Party is a socialist political party in the United Kingdom announced in July 2025 by Jeremy Corbyn and Zarah Sultana. It was registered with the Electoral Commission on 30 September 2025. The party is led by its Central Executive Committee, under a system of collective leadership. Corbyn has served as the party's parliamentary leader since March 2026.

Your Party has two declared members of Parliament (MPs), Corbyn and Sultana, in the House of Commons, with two MPs in the Independent Alliance, also in the party but not declared as supporters in Parliament. Sultana had joined the Independent Alliance in July 2025, but exited in September. Two further Independent Alliance MPs had supported Your Party, but have since withdrawn their support.

There have been disputes between its key figures regarding how the party should have been launched, including a contested launch of paid membership, questions of the role of social conservatism, as well as issues regarding gender imbalance, dual membership and democratic accountability. As of August 2026, the party's leadership is split between Corbyn-led and Sultana-led factions, with Corbyn's faction in effective control.

== History ==
=== Background ===
The former Labour Party leader Jeremy Corbyn stood as an independent candidate for Islington North at the 2024 general election, winning re-election. He then formed a parliamentary group, the Independent Alliance, with four independent MPs who were elected on pro-Palestinian platforms.

Discussions were held in autumn 2024 involving Corbyn and senior members of an umbrella organisation called Collective including Corbyn's former chief of staff Karie Murphy, the former Labour Mayor of the North of Tyne Jamie Driscoll (leader of Majority), Tower Hamlets mayor Lutfur Rahman (leader of Aspire) and others. At the time, it was reported the intention was to create a party called "Collective". Politics Home reported one idea for the leadership group was to be Corbyn, Rahman, the former National Assembly of South Africa member Andrew Feinstein, and the former Respect Party leader Salma Yaqoob. According to The Spectator, three of the members of the Independent Alliance, Shockat Adam, Adnan Hussain and Ayoub Khan, were in favour of the creation of a political party to build momentum, but Corbyn was more hesitant. By 2025, Collective involved groups including Aspire, Just Stop Oil, The Muslim Vote, the Socialist Party, Trade Union and Socialist Coalition (TUSC), and independents in Liverpool and Harrow.

Zarah Sultana was re-elected as a Labour Party MP in 2024, but shortly afterward had the whip suspended for voting in favour of scrapping the two child benefit cap, and soon became involved in discussions towards a new party. Feinstein, Driscoll and the former Labour MP Beth Winter set up the company MoU Operations Ltd (MoU), incorporated on 2 April 2025, "to support the creation of an alliance of progressive community independents, with Jeremy Corbyn playing a central role in its formation". The directors have said that the company was not involved in the creation of Your Party.

=== Announcement ===
At the start of July 2025, an online meeting of an organising committee was convened by Salma Yaqoob, bringing together various socialist activists. The discussions included Corbyn and his allies in Collective, as well as Sultana. A vote was passed in favour of forming a party co-led by Corbyn and Sultana. Corbyn and his allies had abstained, as they wished to wait until a conference setting up a new party was held to vote on the leadership.

On 3 July 2025, Sultana announced online that she was leaving Labour and planned to create a new political party with Corbyn and other independents. Independent Alliance MP Iqbal Mohamed supported her comments on social media. Corbyn confirmed there were ongoing discussions around forming a new party. Corbyn had not been expecting the announcement, and it reportedly "frustrated" him. According to The Times, Corbyn had not agreed to Sultana's statement, and had implored her to delete it after posting.

On 24 July, Corbyn and Sultana launched a website with a mailing list sign-up, and invited supporters to an inaugural conference. The website was named "Your Party", which was described by Sultana as an interim name. The other members of the Independent Alliance expressed support for the creation of a new party, and welcomed Sultana to the group.

Corbyn said that more than 80,000 people signed up to the party's mailing list in the first five hours, and in less than a week, the party had received over 600,000 sign-ups. Sky News reported that the party had about 200 councillors already involved, some of whom had come from existing independent groups. By 22 August, the party was said to have over 800,000 sign-ups, including over 23,000 in Wales, and over 40,000 in Scotland. An online form asking for suggestions for a permanent name opened on 26 August.

=== Membership launch dispute ===
Membership opened in September. Mark Serwotka, the former General Secretary of the Public and Commercial Services Union, and the former Labour MP Claudia Webbe stated that they had joined the party. On 18 September 2025, Sultana and her team sent out a formal membership invitation by email to those who had expressed interest in the new party, and saw more than 22,000 sign up, which raised an estimated £500,000. Sultana announced the membership launch on her social media and attributed rumours about it being fake to "right-wing bad faith actors". On her account on the social media site X, Sultana posted a new sign-up URL for a membership portal on a different domain to the party's main website.

Within hours, the other five members of the Independent Alliance released a joint statement that urged supporters to ignore the "unauthorised email" and cancel any direct debits, and declared that legal advice was being taken. The statement was posted by Corbyn on X and circulated by email. Another statement posted on the official Your Party X account stated that the data controller had reported the matter to the Information Commissioner's Office. In January, the Information Commissioner’s Office concluded that its involvement was not required, and advised the party to consider going to the police if it wished to determine whether “serious criminal activity” occurred. The party did not refer itself to the police.

In her counter-statement on X, Sultana said that she had acted "in line with the roadmap set out to members" and "to safeguard the grassroots involvement" after having been "sidelined by the MPs named in [the] statement", adding that Your Party was being run as a "sexist boys' club" due to a lack of gender balance on the party's Working Group. She also alleged that Corbyn's former chief of staff Karie Murphy had been handed "sole financial control", and informed that membership fees were received by the company MoU Operations Ltd, in which Corbyn and his team had no direct involvement. Sultana urged Corbyn to meet with her to discuss the dispute and to make all agreements public. At the annual conference of the Peace and Justice Project on 20 September, Corbyn defended Murphy, saying he was "appalled" when people attacked her.

PoliticsHome reported that a split was now "inevitable" according to "several" party sources while some external observers speculated about the collapse of the project. Corbyn allies who spoke to BBC News and to the Middle East Eye did not believe reconciliation was likely but claimed that the party building process would follow the agreed schedule, with key decisions left to members at the November conference. Corbyn's former policy director Andrew Fisher and The Guardian journalist Owen Jones both warned that a prolonged dispute would lead to a transfer of support to the Green Party, and Corbyn's former spokesman Matt Zarb-Cousin called on Corbyn and Sultana to both join the Green Party. The Guardian reported on the following day that the "public split" contributed to a "surge" in the Green Party membership, with the party gaining over 1,400 members in 24 hours.

On 19 September, Sultana wrote she had instructed defamation lawyers to take action against the authors of "false and defamatory statements" concerning her launch of the membership portal, and described the "attacks" as "baseless" and "politically-motivated". On 20 September, Jamie Driscoll, Andrew Feinstein and Beth Winter, the directors of MoU Operations Ltd, published a letter saying they had "tried to mediate between Jeremy and Zarah for some weeks" and "demanded a meeting [to which one side had] not responded despite multiple attempts", and promising to communicate a mechanism for refunds. On 21 September, Sultana announced in a further statement she would desist from legal action "as an act of good faith" and was "determined to reconcile" during ongoing talks with Corbyn.

=== Official membership launch ===
On 24 September 2025, Corbyn announced the launch of the official membership portal for the party via a video on social media, based on the same domain as the party's original website. The party said that members that signed up using the previous membership system would be carried over automatically. Later that day, Sultana reaffirmed that she was a member of the party. Following a joint appearance by Sultana and Corbyn at The World Transformed in October, Sultana said that the pair were still able to work together and compared their relationship to that of Oasis' Gallagher brothers. The Daily Telegraph and The Guardian reported that legal issues were preventing members who had signed up with the first membership portal controlled by MoU Operations Ltd from transferring their details and funds to the new system. The Guardian also reported that figures in Your Party would be taking legal action against MoU's directors. Feinstein, Winter and Driscoll subsequently resigned as directors of MoU, with Sultana taking control as the sole director of the company from 28 October.

On 29 October, the party published its draft founding documents, including plans for its constitution, the rules of the party, organisational strategy and a political statement. Party members could use an online crowd editing tool to suggest edits and suggestions, before a final version was created to be voted on at the inaugural conference. On 3 November, it was announced that Your Party membership stood at 50,000, which was below the 100,000–200,000 members that insiders had expected to sign up. Reports suggested that the total amount of money held by MoU was around £1,300,000, with £800,000 from the initial donations and the rest from Sultana's membership launch. An offer by Sultana to transfer £600,000 from MoU in a series of phases was opposed by the Independent Alliance MPs. The first £200,000 was transferred on 13 November. Ahead of the party's inaugural conference, Sultana stated that she had transferred £600,000 (of the initial donations), with any remaining money to follow when liabilities were settled and "the legal details are ironed out".

On 14 November, Adnan Hussain withdrew his support for Your Party over "persistent infighting" within the party. In a statement on social media he also claimed that there had been prejudice towards himself and other Muslim MPs within the party, including the use of "offensive slurs". Hussain confirmed that he would continue to sit as an independent Alliance MP. Around the same time, Jamie Driscoll told The House that he was not a member of Your Party and would not be joining, and subsequently joined the Green Party a month later. Iqbal Mohamed left Your Party on 21 November. In a statement on X, Mohamed cited the "many false allegations and smears made against me and others, and reported as fact without evidence". He also said that Zarah Sultana had "voluntarily left the Independent Alliance and the Your Party stewarding group on 18 Sept 2025" (the date that she launched the first membership portal). Sultana has said that she was "excluded". Mohamed said that he would continue serving as an independent MP, working with his colleagues in the Independent Alliance.

=== Inaugural conference ===
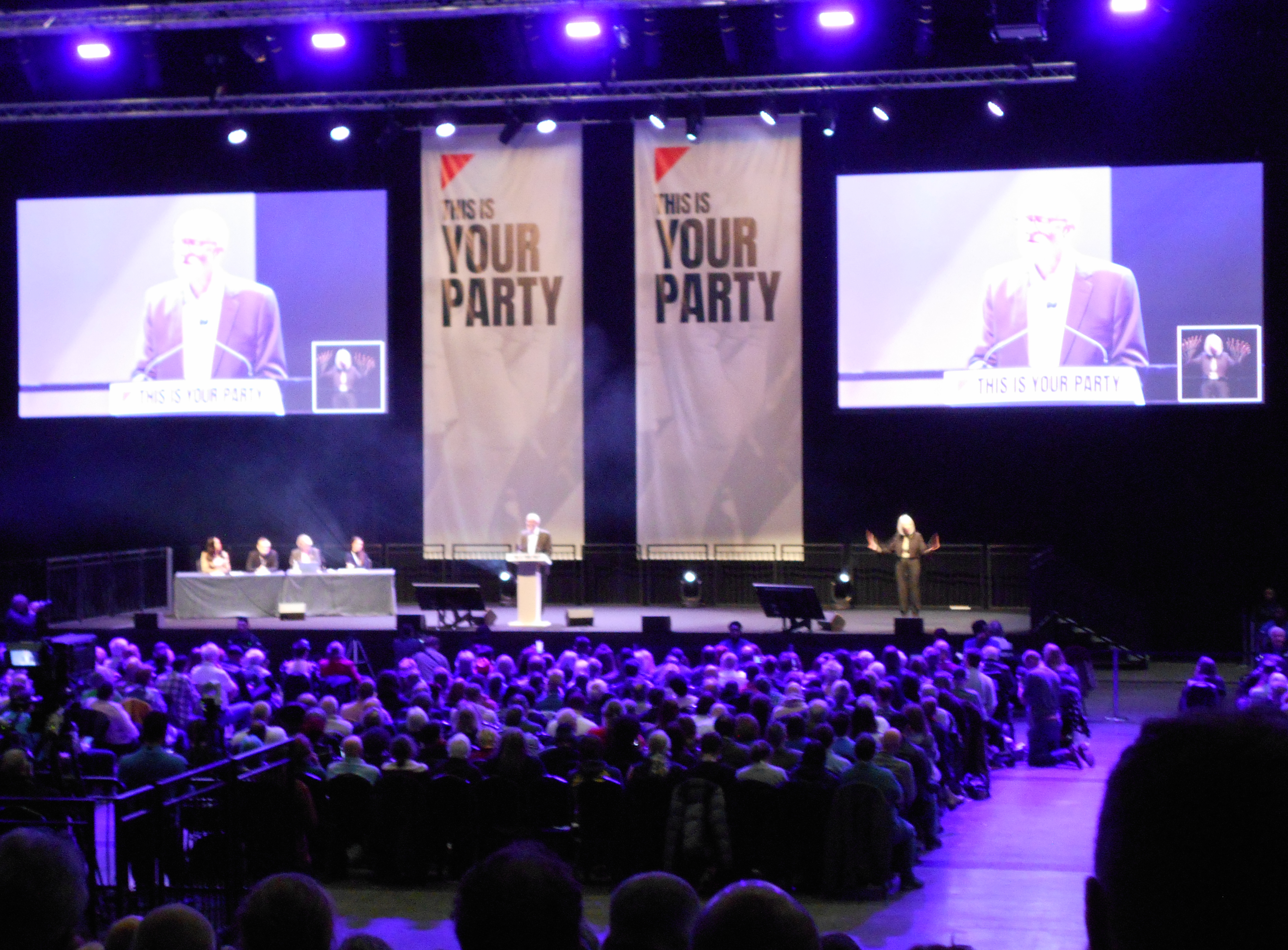
Jeremy Corbyn giving his speech at the conference on 29 November 2025

The party's inaugural conference was held on 29 and 30 November 2025 at the ACC in Liverpool, following a number of regional assemblies. About 2,500 members selected via a sortition process participated in the conference, fewer than an initial target of 13,000 attendees. Delegates voted on the party's founding documents, including its constitution, standing orders, organisational strategy and a political statement, using a one-member-one-vote system. Although she arrived at the venue, Sultana did not attend the first day of the conference in protest at the exclusion of delegates for holding membership of other political parties, including members of the Socialist Workers Party. In another incident, members of the Revolutionary Communist Group were removed from the venue.

The conference subsequently voted to allow such dual memberships. On the second day of the conference, the delegates voted against having any single leader, instead opting for the party to have a collective leadership consisting of a Central Executive Committee with a chairperson who was required not to be an MP, the position supported by Sultana. The delegates also voted to permanently adopt the then-temporary name Your Party, rejecting the alternate names of Our Party, Popular Alliance, and For The Many.

=== Post-formation ===
By 1 December 2025, the party had a membership of 55,000. On 6 December, The Telegraph reported that the Electoral Commission was investigating a complaint made by group Labour Against Antisemitism that the name 'Your Party' could breach the Political Parties, Elections and Referendums Act 2000 by misleading voters. On 7 December, Sultana called for discussion around possible electoral alliances with the Greens.

The party's first conference in Scotland was held on 7 and 8 February 2026 in Dundee to establish its Scottish branch. Your Party Scotland members voted to stand candidates for the 2026 Scottish Parliament election on a strategy of standing candidates on the regional list in a limited number of regions. Members also voted for Your Party Scotland to be an organisationally independent party that remains in alliance with Your Party in England and Wales, adopted a collective leadership structure, and adopted policy positions supporting Scottish independence and mandating representatives to "never vote for cuts". Gaelic-speaking members voted to adopt "Am Pàrtaidh Agaibh" as Your Party's Gaelic name. The former Welsh Labour MP Beth Winter said in February she was no longer a member of Your Party. Your Party did not stand a candidate in the 2026 Gorton and Denton by-election as the CEC was not formed in time.

Elections for the party's Central Executive Committee were conducted from 5 February to 23 February 2026. The CEC election was described by party insiders as a "proxy war" between Corbyn and Sultana. Sultana endorsed a "Grassroots Left" slate of candidates, and Corbyn endorsed an opposing slate named "The Many". The elections resulted in the Corbyn-aligned "The Many" slate winning a majority of 14 out of 24 seats, with the Sultana-aligned "Grassroots Left" slate winning 7 seats and independent candidates winning 3 seats. Following the election, Corbyn was elected Your Party's parliamentary leader by the CEC. On 15 March 2026, Andrew Feinstein confirmed on X that he had not joined Your Party because of "factionalism & a number of other issues", and said he was working with the Camden People's Alliance to unseat both Labour MPs in Camden: Keir Starmer and Tulip Siddiq.

In March 2026, the interim Scottish Executive Committee leading Your Party Scotland announced it will be unable to stand candidates in the 2026 Scottish Parliament election due to inaction from the national party. Niall Christie, the sole Scottish representative on the CEC, said members were leaving the Scottish party due to inaction and a lack of autonomy, and criticised the CEC for a lack of engagement with Your Party Scotland. On 13 April, Christie and all 12 of the party's interim Scottish executive committee resigned, criticising the central leadership for, among other things, blocking them from standing candidates. On 12 May, 29 members of the party's Edinburgh and Lothian branch resigned on masse, saying the party was no longer a "viable vehicle" for left-wing politics in Scotland.

On 12 April, the Central Executive Committee banned dual memberships with certain socialist parties, including the Socialist Workers Party, Alliance for Workers' Liberty, and Scottish Socialist Party. This issue has been a point of contention between the Corbyn and Sultana factions. For the 2026 UK local elections, Your Party announced it would endorse 250 candidates, a majority of whom would be independent candidates and community groups aligned with the party's platform rather than Your Party candidates. The party said it would target its efforts towards urban areas with large Muslim populations where support for Labour has weakened, such as Tower Hamlets (where they support Aspire), Newham, Redbridge, and Bradford. 20 candidates in 17 wards stood under the Your Party name; none were elected. Discontent with the election results and the direction of the party led to some members of the Grassroots Left faction leaving the party to form a new party, Socialist Federation. The party's first conference in Wales is planned to be held on 18 and 19 July 2026 in Aberystwyth to establish the party's Welsh branch. Corbyn is set to address the conference, and Your Party Cymru members will vote on the party's constitution, standing orders, organisational strategy, and political statement.

== Ideology and positions ==
In their joint statement formally announcing the new party in July 2025, Corbyn and Sultana mentioned policy areas such as wealth redistribution, nationalisation, investing in social housing and opposing the privatisation of the National Health Service. They stated that members would decide on the party's direction, leadership and policies at an inaugural conference.

At the time of its launch, the party was expected to be significantly more critical of Israel compared to Labour, with its founding platform setting out Your Party's opposition to selling arms to the Israeli military. In an interview in August 2025, Sultana claimed that Corbyn, when he was Labour leader, had "capitulated" in adopting the International Holocaust Remembrance Alliance definition of antisemitism, arguing that the definition equates antisemitism with anti-Zionism. Following commentary around these statements, Sultana posted to social media that she was an anti-Zionist. Her comments were criticised by Jewish organisations, including the Board of Deputies and Campaign Against Antisemitism. Responding, in a separate interview, Corbyn suggested it was "not really necessary" to "bring all that up", and said that he was more in favour of the Jerusalem Declaration. In November, the New Statesman reported that activists and members had repeatedly pressed Corbyn to clarify his position and confirm that the party would be anti-Zionist. Corbyn responded by restating his support for Palestine.

The party has been described by observers as embroiled in divided views between members who support progressive stances on LGBTQ rights and transgender issues and those who hold socially conservative beliefs on the matter. The divide was cited as a factor in MPs Adnan Hussain and Iqbal Mohamed withdrawing their support for Your Party, while The Independent cited the more progressive faction around Sultana as ideologically clashing with the socially conservative attitudes among some Muslim communities which Your Party also hopes to win support from. The dispute had emerged in September 2025, after Adnan Hussain publicly agreed with a social media user who said that the fledgling party shouldn't "parrot the same neoliberal idea of gender ideology" and called for separate spaces for transgender people. Sultana later stated that "trans rights are human rights. Your Party will defend them. No ifs, no buts, and I won’t let anyone get in the way of this fight", without naming Hussain publicly. Corbyn has not taken a stance over whether there should be a zero tolerance approach to allowing such views in the party. During its November 2025 conference, the party's members voted to add the term "trans liberation" to its mission statement to fight the "struggles of all oppressed people."

Interviewed at the Majority conference in September 2025, Sultana named "beating Reform" as the party's "most important goal for the [following] four years". At the party's founding conference, held in November 2025, members voted for the party to describe itself as a "member-led socialist party". At the founding conference of Your Party Scotland, held in February 2026, Scottish members voted to support Scottish independence and to move towards making Your Party Scotland an independent sister party. At the conference, Corbyn said that if the people of Scotland want to hold an independence referendum then "that is their choice".

== Electoral history ==
=== 2026 local elections ===
Your Party initially listed 24 candidates due to stand across 15 wards in the 2026 United Kingdom local elections. However, only 20 candidates across 12 wards eventually ran, none of whom were elected.

Council	Candidates	Votes
Birmingham	5	3,543
Croydon	1	327
Greenwich	2	1,064
Hampshire	1	43
Leeds	1	62
Lewisham	3	270
Peterborough	1	78
Salford	1	66
Stockport	1	54
Tameside	1	123
Waltham Forest	1	180
West Lancashire	2	450
Total	20	6,260

== Representation ==
=== House of Commons ===
Prior to the withdrawal of Hussain and then Mohamed from Your Party in November, all members of the Independent Alliance, including Sultana, had expressed an intention to sit for the new party in the UK House of Commons. The party is also attempting to convince a number of sitting Labour MPs, including those from the Socialist Campaign Group, to defect and join the new party.

On 18 November 2025, Zarah Sultana became Your Party's first MP in the House of Commons. Shockat Adam and Ayoub Khan continue to be listed as Independent MPs as, according to a Your Party source, they believe they cannot unilaterally declare themselves as Your Party MPs while the party is being governed by an interim authority. In March 2026, Jeremy Corbyn was elected as the party's parliamentary leader, and Politics Home reported that Corbyn was set to become a Your Party MP after going through the necessary CEC and parliamentary procedures. In June 2026, Corbyn began to be listed as a Your Party MP in parliament.

Portrait	Member	Constituency	Elected	Joined Your Party
	Zarah Sultana	Coventry South	12 December 2019	18 November 2025
	Jeremy Corbyn	Islington North	9 June 1983	10 June 2026
	Shockat Adam	Leicester South	4 July 2024	Sits as an independent
	Ayoub Khan	Birmingham Perry Barr	4 July 2024	Sits as an independent

=== Local government ===
Various councillors were involved in talks leading up to the creation of the party. As of December 2025, 28 councillors had declared their support for Your Party. Lancashire County Council has three councillors that have joined the party, while Walsall Council and Hastings Borough Council have six councillors each. Three Scottish Green councillors on Glasgow City Council defected to Your Party in October 2025.

Council	Councillors
Amber Valley	2 / 42
Cambridge	1 / 42
Glasgow City	3 / 85
King's Lynn and West Norfolk	1 / 55
Lancashire	3 / 84
Preston	1 / 48
Wirral	1 / 66

== Structure ==
The Daily Telegraph reported in July 2025 that Corbyn and his allies were in the process of forming a steering committee for the new party, which would operate independently from the Peace & Justice Project, a campaign movement led by Corbyn. The six Independent Alliance MPs would oversee the founding of the party.

There are discussions about trades unions possibly affiliating. The party was registered with the Electoral Commission on 30 September 2025 under the name "Your Party". Corbyn was listed as leader of the party, with Adnan Hussain and Marion Roberts listed as nominating officer and treasurer respectively. The Commission requires a single named leader and does not recognise co-leadership. By December 2025, Andrew Jordan had replaced Adnan Hussain as the nominating officer.

=== Central Executive Committee ===
At the party's inaugural conference, delegates voted to adopt a collective leadership model, in which an elected Central Executive Committee would make executive decisions. The committee is composed of 24 members: four public office holders (such as MPs, mayors, or councillors), two 'ordinary member' representatives for each of the nine regions of England, and one representative each for Scotland and Wales. The committee elects a non-MP chair, vice chair, and spokesperson to provide public political leadership.

Composition of Central Executive Committee
Region	Member	Slate	Officers' Group
Public office holders	Jeremy Corbyn	The Many	Parliamentary Leader
Public office holders	Zarah Sultana	Grassroots Left	
Public office holders	Laura Smith	The Many	Vice Chair
Public office holders	Grace Lewis	Grassroots Left	
North West	Sam Gorst	Independent	
North West	Dawn Aspinall	The Many	Secretary
North East	Catherine Davis	The Many	
North East	Hannah Hawkins	The Many	
Yorkshire and the Humber	Monique Mosley	The Many	
Yorkshire and the Humber	Sophie Wilson	Grassroots Left	
East of England	Solma Ahmed	Grassroots Left	
East of England	Jo Rust	The Many	
West Midlands	Megan Clarke	Grassroots Left	
West Midlands	Fadel Takrouri (Note: Takrouri was elected after a recalculation of votes following the resignation of Sue Moffat (The Many) due to family illness.)	The Many	Treasurer
East Midlands	Louise Regan	The Many	Political Officer
East Midlands	Riaz Khan	The Many	
London	Melecia Mullins	Grassroots Left	
London	Noor Jahan Begum	The Many	Spokesperson
South East	Naomi Wimborne-Idrissi	Independent	
South East	Cassandra Bellingham	The Many	Membership Officer
South West	Candi Williams	Grassroots Left	
South West	Jennifer Forbes	The Many	Chair
Wales	Maria Donnellan	The Many	
Scotland	Jim Monaghan (Note: Monaghan was elected after a recalculation of votes following the resignation of Niall Christie (Independent) alongside the interim Scottish executive committee.)	Independent	

==== 2026 CEC election ====
Elections for the Central Executive Committee were conducted from 5 February to 23 February 2026, using a single transferable vote system. The elections resulted in the Corbyn-aligned "The Many" slate winning a majority of 14 out of 24 seats, with the Sultana-aligned "Grassroots Left" slate winning 7 seats and independent candidates winning 3 seats. On 8 March 2026, the CEC elected the party's Officers' Group, including Jennifer Forbes as chair, former MP Laura Smith as vice-chair, and Jeremy Corbyn as parliamentary leader. All members of the Officers' Group were elected as part of the Corbyn-aligned "The Many" slate.

== Polling ==
Polling carried out by YouGov in July 2025 found that 18% of the electorate would be open to consider voting for a new party led by Corbyn. In November 2025 they found that this had fallen to 12%. Another poll carried out by Ipsos in August found that 20% of voters considered themselves very or fairly likely to back the new party, while 31% would be open to voting for a united ticket between the new party and the Green Party. In late 2025, the party polled between 4% and 6% in hypothetical voting intention polls.

== See also ==
- List of Labour Party breakaway parties (UK)
