= Adnan Hussain =

British politician (born 1989)

Adnan Hussain MP
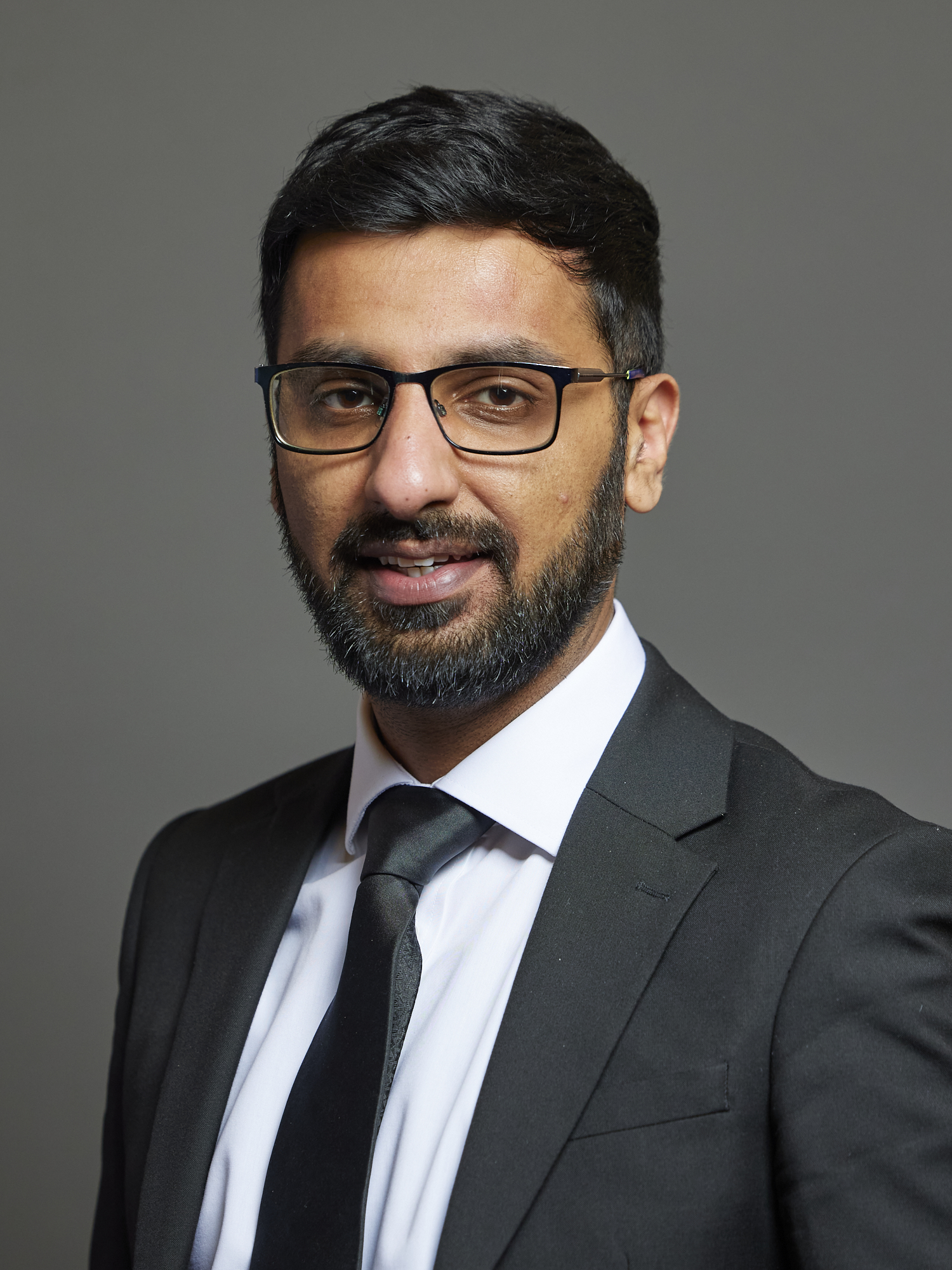
- Official portrait, 2024

Member of Parliament for Blackburn
- Incumbent
- Assumed office 4 July 2024
- Preceded by: Kate Hollern
- Majority: 132 (0.3%)

Personal details
- Born: July 1989 (age 37) Burnley, Lancashire, England
- Party: Independent
- Other political affiliations: Your Party (2025); Labour (before 2020); Independent Alliance (co-founder, 2024–present)
- Education: Mansfield High School; University of Central Lancashire

Adnan Hussain (born July 1989) is a British independent politician, solicitor and barrister who has served as Member of Parliament (MP) for Blackburn since 2024.

He is a founding member of the Independent Alliance.

== Early life ==
Adnan Hussain was born in Burnley, Lancashire to a father who was an engineer and an alumnus of Liverpool University. He attended Mansfield High School and Blackburn College. He graduated with a Bachelor of Laws degree from the University of Central Lancashire.

== Legal and business career ==
Hussain was admitted as a solicitor in August 2022. From 2017 to 2025 he was a director at Bank View Solicitors in Blackburn, Lancashire. He is a director of two small private companies dealing in real estate.

In the Register of Members' Financial Interests, Hussain has declared shareholdings of over 15% in five companies and ownership of two residential properties in Burnley that provide a rental income of more than £10,000 a year.

== Parliamentary career ==
Hussain was a member of the Labour Party and worked on several campaigns for the Blackburn MP Kate Hollern. He left the party in April 2020 following Keir Starmer's win in the Labour Party leadership election.

Hussain only decided to stand as an independent candidate in the 2024 general election five days after the election was called, placing his bid within "a growing movement" for "a different politics" in Britain. He beat the incumbent Kate Hollern by 132 votes, overturning a Labour Party majority of 18,000. His election campaign focused on the 2024 Israel-Gaza war and was supported by 4BwD, a group of 12 independent councillors on Blackburn with Darwen Borough Council who had resigned from the Labour Party in opposition to its stance on the war. It was led by the former Labour councillor Salim Sidat and featured Ibrahim Master, the Blackburn ex-Labour activist, businessman and community cohesion advocate, former Lancashire Council of Mosques chairman and Lancashire's deputy police and crime commissioner. During the campaign, Hussain said he would speak out "against the injustice being inflicted against the people of Gaza.” He named cultural segregation and economic stagnation as core problems affecting Blackburn, and proposed assistance to local small businesses and to the most vulnerable. After his election, he said: "This is for Gaza" and "We are here on the back of a genocide and if that is giving us an opportunity then we must grasp it and use it for the betterment of our communities.

After Hussain won his seat, The Daily Telegraph reported on speeches he gave in 2014 where he used violent language against the Israeli government and said it was committing genocide against the Palestinian people. He responded by saying that he was speaking in support of boycotting Israel and that "with the maturity of at least ten years since the speech in question, I'd use my words much more carefully".

Hussain sponsored the Independent—Green "Amendment B" to abolish the two-child benefit cap and voted in support of the Scottish National Party's "Amendment D" to abolish the cap. Shortly after the vote, Hussain, Shockat Adam, Jeremy Corbyn, Ayoub Khan, and Iqbal Mohamed produced a joint letter decrying the two major parties and stating the need for a caring alternative. Adam and Corbyn had been in discussions with Khan, Hussain, and Mohamed regarding how to impact policy, with Adam stating that the five were "looking at options that would give us more access to the levers of power."

On 2 September 2024, Hussain became a founding member of the Independent Alliance parliamentary group.

In June 2025, Hussain voted against Tonia Antoniazzi's amendment to the prospective Crime and Policing Bill that would decriminalise abortions occurring after 24 weeks of pregnancy.

Following the announcement of a new party by Zarah Sultana and Corbyn in July 2025, he expressed his support for the initiative. On 31 July 2025, he was appointed company secretary of Your Party UK Limited. He resigned from Your Party on 14 November, citing party infighting as the reason, as well as alleging "generalised accusations and offensive slurs" against Muslims in the party.

== Views ==
In August 2025, Hussain said he believed transgender women were "not biologically women", and that trans people should use separate toilets to men and women, which he described as "safe third spaces". In an article for Politics Home, he said that social conservatism should be welcome in left-wing parties.

== Personal life ==
Hussain lives in Wilpshire, Lancashire. He is of Pakistani descent, his paternal grandfather having moved to the UK from Kharian in the 1950s.

Parliament of the United Kingdom
Preceded by Kate Hollern	Member of Parliament for Blackburn; 2024–present	Incumbent
