= Iqbal Mohamed =

British politician and engineer (born 1970/71)

Iqbal Mohamed MP
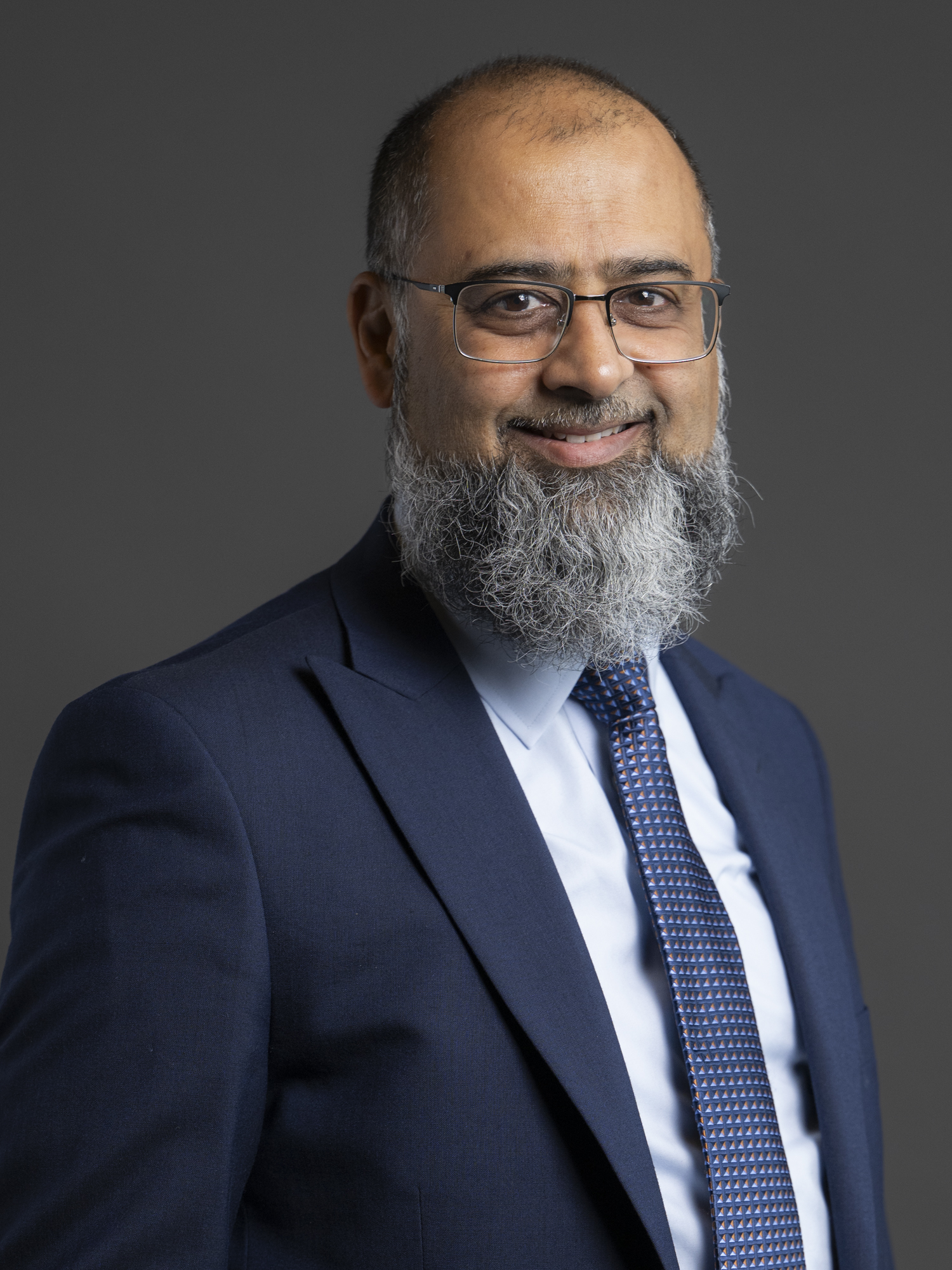
- Official portrait, 2024

Member of Parliament for Dewsbury and Batley
- Incumbent
- Assumed office 4 July 2024
- Preceded by: Constituency established
- Majority: 6,934 (18.2%)

Personal details
- Born: Iqbal Hussain Mohamed; 1970 or 1971 (age 55–56) Dewsbury, West Yorkshire, England
- Party: Independent
- Other political affiliations: Independent Alliance (2024–present); Your Party (2025)
- Education: Durham University (BSc)
- Website: imohamed4mp.co.uk

Iqbal Hussain Mohamed (born 1970 or 1971) is a British independent politician, engineer and IT consultant who has served as the Member of Parliament for Dewsbury and Batley since 2024. Mohamed, campaigning on a pro-Palestine platform, defeated Heather Iqbal of the Labour Party. He became the first independent MP to be elected to a seat in Yorkshire since 1907. On 2 September 2024, he co-founded the Independent Alliance parliamentary group. He was briefly a member of the Jeremy Corbyn-led Your Party.

== Early life and career ==
Mohamed was born in Dewsbury in West Yorkshire into an Indian Muslim family from Bharuch, Gujarat. He attended Westborough High School and Huddersfield New College before attending Durham University where he studied applied physics and electronics. Before his election as an MP, he worked in manufacturing and electrical engineering and later as a consultant in business and technology management.

== Member of Parliament ==
Mohamed was elected as an independent candidate in a shock victory, defeating his Labour Party rival by a margin of 6,934 votes. He is the first independent MP to be elected by a Yorkshire constituency since the 1907 Colne Valley by-election. He was one of five independent candidates elected across England in the 2024 general election, a much higher number than usual; this has been suggested to be in part a result of anger at Labour's stance on the Gaza war.

Mohamed's campaign focused on calling for a ceasefire and two-state solution to the wider Israeli–Palestinian conflict, as well as tackling the United Kingdom cost-of-living crisis.

Mohamed sponsored the Independent–Green "Amendment B" to abolish the two-child benefit cap, and voted in support of the Scottish National Party's "Amendment D" to abolish the cap. Both amendments were voted down by the Labour Party. Shortly after the vote, Iqbal Mohamed, Shockat Adam, Jeremy Corbyn, Adnan Hussain, and Ayoub Khan produced a joint letter decrying the two major parties and stating the need for a caring alternative. Adam and Corbyn had been in discussions with Khan, Hussain, and Mohamed regarding how to impact policy, with Adam stating that the five were "looking at options that would give us more access to the levers of power". On 2 September 2024, Mohamed was a founding member of the Independent Alliance parliamentary group.

In December 2024, Conservative MP Richard Holden submitted a Ten Minute Rule bill to ban marriages between first cousins. Mohamed argued against the bill, stating that there were health risks associated with first-cousin marriages but that a ban would be ineffective, and the issues would be best addressed through education programmes to raise awareness of the risks. Mohamed also argued for more education about the risks of first-cousin marriage, and for test screening for children of prospective couples.

In July 2025, Mohamed voted against an Abortion Bill amendment that would have decriminalized abortion after 24 weeks of pregnancy.

In September 2025, Mohamed, Shockat Adam, Ayoub Khan, and Adnan Hussain co-signed the letter in support of Jeremy Corbyn during the membership launch dispute of "Your Party", a forming Zarah Sultana–Corbyn political party. During a breakdown of relations within the group, Sultana criticised the Independent Alliance as a "sexist boys' club". Mohamed left Your Party on 21 November.

In January 2026, the parliamentary standards commissioner opened an investigation into Mohamed over denial of the October 7 attacks.

Parliament of the United Kingdom
New constituency	Member of Parliament for Dewsbury and Batley; 2024–present	Incumbent
