= Dewsbury and Batley =

UK Parliament constituency (since 2024)

Coordinates: 53.68°N 1.63°W

- County constituency for the House of Commons
- Boundaries since 2024
- Boundary of Dewsbury and Batley in Yorkshire and the Humber
- County: West Yorkshire
- Major settlements: Batley; Dewsbury; Kirkburton; Thornhill

Current constituency
- Created: 2024
- Member of Parliament: Iqbal Mohamed (Independent)
- Seats: One
- Created from: Dewsbury (majority); Batley and Spen (minority)

Dewsbury and Batley is a constituency of the House of Commons in the UK Parliament, represented since 2024 by Iqbal Mohamed, an independent. It was created following the 2023 review of Westminster constituencies, and first contested in the 2024 general election. The constituency is located in the borough of Kirklees in West Yorkshire.

== Constituency profile ==
The Dewsbury and Batley constituency is located in West Yorkshire within the borough of Kirklees. It covers the connected towns of Dewsbury and Batley as well as a rural area to the south, including the villages of Thornhill and Flockton. The area forms part of the Heavy Woollen District, a region of West Yorkshire that was traditionally reliant on the textile trade. The constituency has high levels of deprivation, with parts of both towns falling within the 10% most-deprived areas in England.

House prices in the constituency are amongst the lowest in the country, and residents have low levels of income, education and professional employment compared to nationwide averages. The constituency has a significant Muslim community of predominantly Indian and Pakistani origin who made up 44% of the population at the 2021 census. The Muslim population is concentrated in the neighbourhoods of Savile Town (where they made up 90% of residents) and Batley Carr. Most of the constituency is represented by Labour Party and independent councillors at the local council, with some Conservative representation in the rural south. An estimated 55% of voters in the constituency supported leaving the European Union in the 2016 referendum compared to 52% nationwide.

== Boundaries ==
The constituency is composed of the following (as they existed on 1 December 2020):

- The Borough of Kirklees wards of Batley East; Batley West; Dewsbury East; Dewsbury South; Dewsbury West; Kirkburton (polling districts KB04, KB07A, KB07B and KB10).

It comprises the following areas of Kirklees:

Areas	Kirklees Wards	Former Constituency
Batley	Batley East, and Batley West	Batley and Spen
Dewsbury	Dewsbury East, Dewsbury South, and Dewsbury West	Dewsbury
Flockton / Grange Moor	Kirkburton (minority)	Dewsbury (plus 30 voters from Huddersfield)

== Members of Parliament ==
Dewsbury and Batley & Spen prior to 2024

Election	Member	Party
2024	Iqbal Mohamed	Independent

== Elections ==
=== Elections in the 2020s ===
General election 2024: Dewsbury and Batley
Party	Candidate	Votes	%	±%
Independent	Iqbal Mohamed	15,641	41.1	N/A
Labour	Heather Iqbal	8,707	22.9	▼36.2
Reform	Jonathan Thackray	6,152	16.2	▲12.8
Conservative	Lalit Suryawanshi	4,182	11.0	▼17.7
Green	Simon Cope	2,048	5.4	▲4.3
Liberal Democrats	John Rossington	1,340	3.5	▲1.0
Majority		6,934	18.2	N/A
Turnout		38,070	53.1	▼12.5
Registered electors		71,685		
Independent gain from Labour				

=== Elections in the 2010s ===
2019 notional result
Party	Vote	%
Labour	27,241	59.1
Conservative	13,232	28.7
Others	2.395	5.1
Brexit Party	1,565	3.4
Liberal Democrats	1,156	2.5
Green	512	1.1
Turnout	46,101	65.6
Electorate	70,226	

== See also ==
- Parliamentary constituencies in West Yorkshire
- Parliamentary constituencies in Yorkshire and the Humber
