= Results of the 2024 United Kingdom general election =

These are the results of the 2024 general election, by constituency, held on 4 July 2024.

== By country and constituency ==
=== England ===
Constituency	County	Region	2019 seat	2024 seat					Votes							Turnout (Note: Excludes spoilt ballots)
Constituency	County	Region	2019 seat	Party	Candidate	Votes	Share	Majority	Lab. (Note: Includes Labour Party and allied Co-operative Party)	Con.	Ref.	Lib. Dems	Green	Other (Note: Includes all other parties, all independent candidates and the Speaker)	Total	Turnout
Aldershot	HAM	SE	Con	Lab	Alex Baker	19,764	40.7%	5,683	19,764	14,081	8,210	4,052	2,155	282	48,544	61.8%
Aldridge-Brownhills	WMD	WM	Con	Con	Wendy Morton	15,901	38.8%	4,231	11,670	15,901	9,903	1,755	1,746	—N/a	40,975	58.2%
Altrincham and Sale West	GTM	NW	Con	Lab	Connor Rand	20,798	40.4%	4,174	20,798	16,624	4,961	4,727	3,699	643	51,452	69.5%
Amber Valley	DBY	EM	Con	Lab	Linsey Farnsworth	15,746	37.0%	3,554	15,746	10,725	12,192	1,590	2,278	—N/a	42,531	59.5%
Arundel and South Downs	WSX	SE	Con	Con	Andrew Griffith	22,001	40.2%	12,134	9,782	22,001	7,391	9,867	5,515	184	54,740	70.2%
Ashfield	NTT	EM	Con	Ref	Lee Anderson	17,062	42.8%	5,509	11,554	3,271	17,062	619	1,100	6,276	39,881	57.9%
Ashford	KEN	SE	Con	Lab	Sojan Joseph	15,262	32.5%	1,779	15,262	13,483	10,141	2,445	4,355	1,289	46,975	61.6%
Ashton-under-Lyne	GTM	NW	Lab	Lab	Angela Rayner	15,575	43.9%	6,791	15,575	4,375	8,784	1,411	2,481	2,835	35,461	49.9%
Aylesbury	BKM	SE	Con	Lab	Laura Kyrke-Smith	15,081	30.2%	630	15,081	14,451	6,746	10,440	2,590	632	49,940	63.1%
Banbury	OXF	SE	Con	Lab	Sean Woodcock	18,468	38.3%	3,256	18,468	15,212	6,284	4,352	2,615	1,247	48,178	65.8%
Barking	LND	LND	Lab	Lab	Nesil Caliskan	16,227	44.5%	11,054	16,227	4,294	5,173	1,015	4,988	4,780	36,477	45.7%
Barnsley North	SYK	YTH	Lab	Lab	Dan Jarvis	18,610	50.4%	7,811	18,610	3,083	10,799	1,336	1,805	1,261	37,026	47.2%
Barnsley South	SYK	YTH	Lab	Lab	Stephanie Peacock	16,399	46.7%	4,748	16,399	3,247	11,651	1,172	1,521	1,092	35,109	46.2%
Barrow and Furness	CMA	NW	Con	Lab	Michelle Scrogham	18,537	43.9%	5,324	18,537	13,213	7,035	1,680	1,466	290	42,221	56.3%
Basildon and Billericay	ESS	E	Con	Con	Richard Holden	12,905	30.6%	20	12,885	12,905	11,354	2,292	2,123	565	42,124	54.8%
Basingstoke	HAM	SE	Con	Lab	Luke Murphy	20,922	42.7%	6,484	20,922	14,438	6,314	3,176	3,568	571	48,989	62.4%
Bassetlaw	NTT	EM	Con	Lab	Jo White	18,476	41.2%	5,768	18,476	12,708	9,751	1,996	1,947	—N/a	44,878	57.4%
Bath	AVN	SW	LD	LD	Wera Hobhouse	19,883	41.3%	11,218	8,665	7,659	3,798	19,883	5,952	2,173	48,130	69.1%
Battersea	LND	LND	Lab	Lab	Marsha de Cordova	22,983	48.8%	12,039	22,983	10,944	2,825	4,826	4,239	1,265	47,082	64.7%
Beaconsfield	BKM	SE	Con	Con	Joy Morrissey	18,494	38.8%	5,455	7,216	18,494	6,055	13,039	1,977	945	47,726	65.6%
Beckenham and Penge	LND	LND	Lab	Lab	Liam Conlon	25,753	49.3%	12,905	25,753	12,848	5,355	4,436	3,830	—N/a	52,207	67.7%
Bedford	BDF	E	Lab	Lab	Mohammad Yasin	18,342	45.1%	9,430	18,342	8,912	4,548	4,025	2,394	2,438	40,869	56.2%
Bermondsey and Old Southwark	LND	LND	Lab	Lab	Neil Coyle	16,857	44.8%	7,787	16,857	2,879	3,397	9,070	4,477	923	37,603	54.1%
Bethnal Green and Stepney	LND	LND	Lab	Lab	Rushanara Ali	15,896	34.1%	1,689	15,896	1,920	1,964	4,777	6,391	15,699	46,647	57.3%
Beverley and Holderness	HUM	YTH	Con	Con	Graham Stuart	15,501	34.5%	124	15,377	15,501	8,198	3,386	1,647	788	44,897	62.4%
Bexhill and Battle	SXE	SE	Con	Con	Kieran Mullan	16,186	33.9%	2,657	13,529	16,186	7,929	3,473	2,972	3,661	47,606	66.0%
Bexleyheath and Crayford	LND	LND	Con	Lab	Daniel Francis	15,717	36.2%	2,114	15,717	13,603	9,861	2,204	2,076	—N/a	43,461	61.8%
Bicester and Woodstock	OXF	SE	Con	LD	Calum Miller	19,419	38.7%	4,958	8,236	14,461	5,408	19,419	2,404	291	50,219	67.6%
Birkenhead	MSY	NW	Lab	Lab	Alison McGovern	22,468	52.1%	13,798	22,468	3,238	6,142	2,292	8,670	324	43,134	55.4%
Birmingham Edgbaston	WMD	WM	Lab	Lab	Preet Gill	16,599	44.4%	8,368	16,599	8,231	4,363	2,102	2,797	3,336	37,428	52.1%
Birmingham Erdington	WMD	WM	Lab	Lab	Paulette Hamilton	14,774	43.7%	7,019	14,774	5,402	7,755	1,128	2,452	2,287	33,798	44.1%
Birmingham Hall Green and Moseley	WMD	WM	Lab	Lab	Tahir Ali	12,798	30.8%	5,656	12,798	3,845	2,305	4,711	3,913	14,034	41,606	54.1%
Birmingham Hodge Hill and Solihull North	WMD	WM	Lab	Lab	Liam Byrne	10,655	31.2%	1,566	10,655	4,634	6,456	942	2,360	9,089	34,136	43.9%
Birmingham Ladywood	WMD	WM	Lab	Lab	Shabana Mahmood	15,558	42.5%	3,421	15,558	2,218	1,477	1,711	3,478	12,137	36,579	43.7%
Birmingham Northfield	WMD	WM	Con	Lab	Laurence Turner	14,929	39.7%	5,389	14,929	9,540	7,895	1,791	2,809	688	37,652	50.8%
Birmingham Perry Barr	WMD	WM	Lab	Ind.	Ayoub Khan	13,303	35.5%	507	12,796	4,227	2,446	1,302	2,440	14,265	37,476	49.1%
Birmingham Selly Oak	WMD	WM	Lab	Lab	Alistair Carns	17,371	45.2%	11,537	17,371	5,834	5,732	2,324	4,320	2,842	38,423	50.8%
Birmingham Yardley	WMD	WM	Lab	Lab	Jess Phillips	11,275	31.2%	693	11,275	3,634	5,061	3,634	1,958	10,582	36,144	49.4%
Bishop Auckland	DUR	NE	Con	Lab	Sam Rushworth	17,036	42.1%	6,672	17,036	10,364	9,466	1,373	1,857	331	40,427	57.1%
Blackburn	LAN	NW	Lab	Ind.	Adnan Hussain	10,518	27.0%	132	10,386	3,474	4,844	689	1,416	18,078	38,887	53.1%
Blackley and Middleton South	GTM	NW	Lab	Lab	Graham Stringer	16,864	53.8%	10,220	16,864	3,073	6,614	1,592	3,197	—N/a	31,310	43.4%
Blackpool North and Fleetwood	LAN	NW	Con	Lab	Lorraine Beavers	16,744	40.0%	4,647	16,744	12,097	9,913	1,318	1,269	469	41,810	57.0%
Blackpool South	LAN	NW	Con	Lab	Chris Webb	16,916	48.1%	6,848	16,916	5,504	10,068	1,041	1,207	444	35,180	45.4%
Blaydon and Consett	TWR	NE	Lab	Lab	Liz Twist	21,160	50.1%	11,153	21,160	6,052	10,007	2,273	2,589	135	42,216	59.9%
Blyth and Ashington	NBL	NE	Lab	Lab	Ian Lavery	20,030	49.6%	9,173	20,030	6,121	10,857	1,433	1,960	—N/a	40,401	52.7%
Bognor Regis and Littlehampton	WSX	SE	Con	Con	Alison Griffiths	15,678	32.8%	1,765	13,913	15,678	10,262	5,081	2,185	708	47,827	62.2%
Bolsover	DBY	EM	Con	Lab	Natalie Fleet	17,197	40.5%	6,323	17,197	10,874	9,131	1,478	3,754	—N/a	42,434	55.0%
Bolton North East	GTM	NW	Con	Lab	Kirith Entwistle	16,166	37.3%	6,653	16,166	9,513	9,428	1,507	4,683	2,062	43,359	54.2%
Bolton South and Walkden	GTM	NW	Lab	Lab	Yasmin Qureshi	15,093	40.9%	6,743	15,093	4,170	8,350	1,384	2,827	5,106	36,930	46.4%
Bolton West	GTM	NW	Con	Lab	Phil Brickell	17,363	38.9%	4,945	17,363	12,418	8,517	1,966	4,132	202	44,803	59.6%
Bootle	MSY	NW	Lab	Lab	Peter Dowd	26,729	68.8%	21,983	26,729	1,674	4,746	1,301	3,904	526	38,880	53.2%
Boston and Skegness	LIN	EM	Con	Ref	Richard Tice	15,520	38.4%	2,010	7,629	13,510	15,520	1,375	1,506	915	40,455	53.4%
Bournemouth East	DOR	SW	Con	Lab	Tom Hayes	18,316	40.8%	5,479	18,316	12,837	6,268	3,082	2,790	1,617	44,910	62.1%
Bournemouth West	DOR	SW	Con	Lab	Jessica Toale	14,365	36.4%	3,224	14,365	11,141	6,647	4,311	2,614	340	39,418	56.1%
Bracknell	BRK	SE	Con	Lab	Peter Swallow	14,783	33.7%	784	14,783	13,999	7,445	4,768	2,166	676	43,837	61.2%
Bradford East	WYK	YTH	Lab	Lab	Imran Hussain	14,098	37.9%	6,189	14,098	3,450	4,952	1,910	2,571	10,235	37,151	49.5%
Bradford South	WYK	YTH	Lab	Lab	Judith Cummins	11,833	35.8%	4,392	11,833	4,853	7,441	954	3,366	4,595	33,042	46.5%
Bradford West	WYK	YTH	Lab	Lab	Naz Shah	11,724	31.6%	707	11,724	3,055	2,958	756	3,690	14,898	37,081	47.6%
Braintree	ESS	E	Con	Con	James Cleverly	17,414	35.5%	3,670	13,744	17,414	11,346	2,879	2,878	767	49,028	63.1%
Brent East	LND	LND	Lab	Lab	Dawn Butler	19,370	51.2%	13,047	19,370	6,323	2,024	2,635	3,729	3,721	37,802	48.7%
Brent West	LND	LND	Lab	Lab	Barry Gardiner	17,258	41.7%	3,793	17,258	13,465	2,061	3,013	2,805	2,774	41,376	51.7%
Brentford and Isleworth	LND	LND	Lab	Lab	Ruth Cadbury	20,007	44.2%	9,824	20,007	10,183	3,940	3,863	4,029	3,232	45,254	57.0%
Brentwood and Ongar	ESS	E	Con	Con	Alex Burghart	17,731	36.7%	5,980	11,082	17,731	11,751	5,809	1,770	189	48,332	64.1%
Bridgwater	SOM	SW	Con	Con	Ashley Fox	12,281	30.6%	1,349	10,932	12,281	8,913	5,781	1,720	502	40,129	56.1%
Bridlington and The Wolds	HUM	YTH	Con	Con	Charlie Dewhirst	14,846	34.6%	3,125	11,721	14,846	10,350	3,097	1,595	1,328	43,077	57.7%
Brigg and Immingham	HUM	YTH	Con	Con	Martin Vickers	15,905	37.4%	3,243	12,662	15,905	10,594	1,442	1,905	—N/a	42,508	58.2%
Brighton Kemptown and Peacehaven	SXE	SE	Lab	Lab	Chris Ward	17,893	44.0%	9,663	17,893	8,230	—N/a	3,949	7,997	2,617	40,686	59.2%
Brighton Pavilion	SXE	SE	Grn	Grn	Siân Berry	28,809	55.0%	14,290	14,519	3,975	2,836	1,604	28,809	620	52,363	70.0%
Bristol Central	AVN	SW	Lab	Grn	Carla Denyer	24,539	56.6%	10,407	14,132	1,998	1,338	1,162	24,539	196	43,365	69.1%
Bristol East	AVN	SW	Lab	Lab	Kerry McCarthy	20,748	45.0%	6,606	20,748	6,435	—N/a	2,713	14,142	2,071	46,109	60.7%
Bristol North East	AVN	SW	Lab	Lab	Damien Egan	19,004	45.3%	11,167	19,004	6,216	5,418	1,964	7,837	1,550	41,989	59.9%
Bristol North West	AVN	SW	Lab	Lab	Darren Jones	24,058	49.6%	15,669	24,058	6,773	4,863	4,159	8,389	222	48,464	65.3%
Bristol South	AVN	SW	Lab	Lab	Karin Smyth	18,521	42.7%	7,666	18,521	4,947	6,195	2,721	10,855	164	43,403	57.5%
Broadland and Fakenham	NFK	E	Con	Con	Jerome Mayhew	16,322	33.0%	719	15,603	16,322	8,859	5,526	3,203	—N/a	49,513	64.4%
Bromley and Biggin Hill	LND	LND	Con	Con	Peter Fortune	15,929	34.0%	302	15,627	15,929	8,203	4,352	2,583	94	46,788	66.2%
Bromsgrove	WOR	WM	Con	Con	Bradley Thomas	16,533	32.8%	3,016	13,517	16,533	9,584	7,391	1,675	1,705	50,405	65.9%
Broxbourne	HRT	E	Con	Con	Lewis Cocking	15,810	36.8%	2,858	12,952	15,810	8,782	2,688	2,461	259	42,952	57.1%
Broxtowe	NTT	EM	Con	Lab	Juliet Campbell	19,561	40.9%	8,403	19,561	11,158	8,402	3,807	3,488	1,422	47,838	66.5%
Buckingham and Bletchley	BKM	SE	Con	Lab	Callum Anderson	17,602	36.9%	2,421	17,602	15,181	7,468	4,300	2,590	500	47,847	63.7%
Burnley	LAN	NW	Con	Lab	Oliver Ryan	12,598	31.7%	3,420	12,598	8,058	7,755	9,178	1,518	612	39,719	53.0%
Burton and Uttoxeter	STS	WM	Con	Lab	Jacob Collier	16,222	35.6%	2,266	16,222	13,956	9,611	1,663	2,119	2,056	45,627	58.5%
Bury North	GTM	NW	Con	Lab	James Frith	19,625	43.1%	6,944	19,625	12,681	7,385	1,317	1,747	2,765	45,520	58.6%
Bury South	GTM	NW	Con	Lab	Christian Wakeford	19,247	45.6%	9,361	19,247	9,886	6,865	1,796	2,715	1,705	42,214	56.0%
Bury St Edmunds and Stowmarket	SFK	E	Con	Lab	Peter Prinsley	16,745	32.9%	1,452	16,745	15,293	8,595	3,154	5,761	1,345	50,893	64.9%
Calder Valley	SYK	YTH	Con	Lab	Josh Fenton-Glynn	22,046	44.4%	8,991	22,046	13,055	7,644	2,587	3,701	575	49,796	64.1%
Camborne and Redruth	CUL	SW	Con	Lab	Perran Moon	19,360	40.5%	7,806	19,360	11,554	8,952	4,113	2,840	966	47,785	64.3%
Cambridge	CAM	E	Lab	Lab	Daniel Zeichner	19,614	46.6%	11,078	19,614	5,073	—N/a	8,536	6,842	2,035	42,100	59.9%
Cannock Chase	STS	WM	Con	Lab	Josh Newbury	15,671	36.5%	3,125	15,671	12,546	11,570	1,029	2,137	—N/a	42,953	55.8%
Canterbury	KEN	SE	Lab	Lab	Rosie Duffield	19,531	41.4%	8,653	19,531	10,878	6,805	3,812	5,920	285	47,231	66.4%
Carlisle	CMA	NW	Con	Lab	Julie Minns	18,129	39.4%	5,200	18,129	12,929	9,295	2,982	1,922	722	45,979	59.0%
Carshalton and Wallington	LND	LND	Con	LD	Bobby Dean	20,126	43.1%	7,905	6,108	12,221	5,941	20,126	1,517	757	46,670	62.8%
Castle Point	ESS	E	Con	Con	Rebecca Harris	15,485	38.1%	3,251	9,455	15,485	12,234	1,341	2,118	—N/a	40,633	57.2%
Central Devon	DEV	SW	Con	Con	Mel Stride	16,831	31.5%	61	16,770	16,831	7,784	8,232	3,338	477	53,432	71.0%
Central Suffolk and North Ipswich	SFK	E	Con	Con	Patrick Spencer	15,144	32.6%	4,290	10,854	15,144	8,806	5,407	5,652	560	46,423	63.7%
Chatham and Aylesford	KEN	SE	Con	Lab	Tris Osborne	13,689	33.5%	1,998	13,689	11,691	9,989	2,175	2,504	797	40,845	54.4%
Cheadle	GTM	NW	Con	LD	Tom Morrison	23,681	46.7%	12,235	7,909	11,446	5,149	23,681	1,630	916	50,731	68.2%
Chelmsford	ESS	E	Con	LD	Marie Goldman	20,214	39.9%	4,753	6,108	15,461	6,754	20,214	1,588	591	50,868	65.9%
Chelsea and Fulham	LND	LND	Con	Lab	Ben Coleman	18,556	39.4%	152	18,556	18,404	3,144	3,611	2,798	603	47,116	60.0%
Cheltenham	GLS	SW	Con	LD	Max Wilkinson	25,076	50.6%	7,210	2,665	17,866	—N/a	25,076	3,160	775	49,542	65.1%
Chesham and Amersham	BKM	SE	Con	LD	Sarah Green	24,422	44.8%	5,451	3,502	18,971	5,310	24,422	1,673	577	54,455	72.7%
Chester North and Neston	CHS	NW	Lab	Lab	Samantha Dixon	22,258	49.8%	11,870	22,258	10,388	5,870	2,076	4,102	—N/a	44,694	63.7%
Chester South and Eddisbury	CHS	NW	Con	Con	Aphra Brandreth	19,905	37.9%	3,057	16,848	19,905	6,414	5,430	2,278	1,611	52,486	70.7%
Chesterfield	DBY	EM	Lab	Lab	Toby Perkins	19,316	46.5%	10,820	19,316	8,496	7,897	2,553	2,682	611	41,555	58.0%
Chichester	WSX	SE	Con	LD	Jess Brown-Fuller	25,540	49.2%	12,178	3,175	13,368	7,859	25,540	1,815	190	51,947	66.3%
Chingford and Woodford Green	LND	LND	Con	Con	Iain Duncan Smith	17,281	35.6%	4,758	12,524	17,281	3,653	1,275	1,334	12,445	48,512	65.4%
Chippenham	WIL	SW	Con	LD	Sarah Gibson	22,552	45.5%	8,138	3,925	14,414	6,127	22,552	1,954	540	49,557	66.8%
Chipping Barnet	LND	LND	Con	Lab	Dan Tomlinson	21,585	42.4%	2,914	21,585	18,671	3,986	2,614	3,442	561	50,859	65.2%
Chorley	LAN	NW	Spkr	Spkr	Lindsay Hoyle	25,238	74.3%	20,575	—N/a				4,663	29,301	33,964	45.4%
Christchurch	DOR	SW	Con	Con	Christopher Chope	16,941	35.8%	7,455	7,762	16,941	8,961	9,486	1,900	2,285	47,335	66.6%
Cities of London and Westminster	LND	LND	Con	Lab	Rachel Blake	15,302	39.0%	2,708	15,302	12,594	2,752	4,335	2,844	1,388	39,126	53.5%
City of Durham	DUR	NE	Lab	Lab	Mary Kelly Foy	19,131	47.1%	11,757	19,131	5,221	7,374	5,920	2,803	178	40,627	57.6%
Clacton	ESS	E	Con	Ref	Nigel Farage	21,225	46.2%	8,405	7,448	12,820	21,225	2,016	1,935	514	45,958	58.4%
Clapham and Brixton Hill	LND	LND	Lab	Lab	Bell Ribeiro-Addy	24,166	56.5%	10,941	24,166	4,360	1,758	6,161	5,768	528	42,741	57.6%
Colchester	ESS	E	Con	Lab	Pam Cox	18,804	41.9%	8,250	18,804	10,554	6,664	6,393	2,414	74	44,903	57.1%
Colne Valley	WYK	YTH	Con	Lab	Paul Davies	18,970	41.0%	4,963	18,970	14,007	7,298	2,007	3,480	459	46,221	63.7%
Congleton	CHS	NW	Con	Lab	Sarah Russell	18,875	37.7%	3,387	18,875	15,488	8,245	2,785	2,007	2,725	49,425	67.5%
Corby and East Northamptonshire	NTH	EM	Con	Lab	Lee Barron	21,020	42.4%	6,331	21,020	14,689	8,760	2,191	2,507	422	49,589	62.9%
Coventry East	WMD	WM	Lab	Lab	Mary Creagh	18,308	49.5%	11,623	18,308	6,240	6,685	1,227	2,730	1,824	37,142	48.8%
Coventry North West	WMD	WM	Lab	Lab	Taiwo Owatemi	19,696	46.9%	11,174	19,696	8,522	7,950	1,931	3,420	511	42,030	56.0%
Coventry South	WMD	WM	Lab	Lab	Zarah Sultana	20,361	47.6%	10,201	20,361	10,160	5,711	2,531	2,363	1,605	42,731	56.0%
Cramlington and Killingworth	NBL	NE	Lab	Lab	Emma Foody	22,274	49.1%	12,820	22,274	8,592	9,454	1,898	2,144	1,032	45,394	59.5%
Crawley	WSX	SE	Con	Lab	Peter Lamb	17,453	38.2%	5,235	17,453	12,218	8,447	2,205	2,621	2,698	45,642	60.4%
Crewe and Nantwich	CHS	NW	Con	Lab	Connor Naismith	20,837	44.1%	9,727	20,837	11,110	9,602	2,286	2,151	1,211	47,197	60.2%
Croydon East	LND	LND	Lab	Lab	Natasha Irons	18,541	42.4%	6,825	18,541	11,716	5,862	3,563	4,097	—N/a	43,779	57.2%
Croydon South	LND	LND	Con	Con	Chris Philp	19,757	40.0%	2,313	17,444	19,757	4,149	4,384	2,859	785	49,378	65.9%
Croydon West	LND	LND	Lab	Lab	Sarah Jones	20,612	54.1%	14,226	20,612	6,386	2,148	3,667	3,851	1,458	38,122	48.9%
Dagenham and Rainham	LND	LND	Lab	Lab	Margaret Mullane	16,571	42.6%	7,173	16,571	6,926	9,398	1,033	4,184	755	38,867	50.8%
Darlington	DUR	NE	Con	Lab	Lola McEvoy	16,621	39.2%	2,298	16,621	14,323	6,852	1,735	2,847	—N/a	42,378	59.9%
Dartford	KEN	SE	Con	Lab	Jim Dickson	15,392	34.6%	1,192	15,392	14,200	9,523	2,184	3,189	—N/a	44,488	59.0%
Daventry	NTH	EM	Con	Con	Stuart Andrew	17,872	33.7%	3,012	14,860	17,872	10,636	6,755	2,959	—N/a	53,082	65.6%
Derby North	DBY	EM	Con	Lab	Catherine Atkinson	18,619	45.5%	8,915	18,619	9,704	7,488	1,822	3,286	—N/a	40,919	57.1%
Derby South	DBY	EM	Lab	Lab	Baggy Shanker	14,503	38.8%	6,002	14,503	5,192	8,501	1,807	1,899	5,497	37,389	51.3%
Derbyshire Dales	DBY	EM	Con	Lab	John Whitby	17,759	34.6%	350	17,759	17,409	7,728	4,860	2,830	686	51,272	69.9%
Dewsbury and Batley	WYK	YTH	Lab	Ind.	Iqbal Mohamed	15,641	41.1%	6,934	8,707	4,182	6,152	1,340	2,048	15,641	38,070	53.1%
Didcot and Wantage	OXF	SE	Con	LD	Olly Glover	21,793	39.8%	6,233	8,045	15,560	6,400	21,793	2,693	242	54,733	67.8%
Doncaster Central	SYK	YTH	Lab	Lab	Sally Jameson	17,515	46.2%	9,551	17,515	7,964	7,886	1,199	1,880	1,500	38,057	50.8%
Doncaster East and the Isle of Axholme	SYK	YTH	Con	Lab	Lee Pitcher	15,122	38.6%	2,311	15,122	12,811	8,487	1,166	1,400	146	39,266	55.8%
Doncaster North	SYK	YTH	Lab	Lab	Ed Miliband	16,231	52.4%	9,126	16,231	7,105	—N/a	1,045	1,778	4,843	31,002	44.4%
Dorking and Horley	SRY	SE	Con	LD	Chris Coghlan	20,921	41.9%	5,391	4,053	15,530	6,898	20,921	2,563	—N/a	49,965	69.8%
Dover and Deal	KEN	SE	Con	Lab	Mike Tapp	18,940	39.6%	7,559	18,940	10,370	11,355	2,595	3,106	1,409	47,749	62.5%
Droitwich and Evesham	WOR	WM	Con	Con	Nigel Huddleston	19,975	40.1%	8,995	10,980	19,975	9,456	5,131	3,828	239	49,786	64.7%
Dudley	WMD	WM	Con	Lab	Sonia Kumar	12,215	34.1%	1,900	12,215	10,315	9,442	1,056	1,154	1,614	35,796	50.9%
Dulwich and West Norwood	LND	LND	Lab	Lab	Helen Hayes	27,356	60.3%	18,798	27,356	3,873	1,801	3,485	8,567	296	45,378	61.1%
Dunstable and Leighton Buzzard	BDF	E	Con	Lab	Alex Mayer	14,976	32.5%	667	14,976	14,309	8,071	6,497	2,115	77	46,045	60.0%
Ealing Central and Acton	LND	LND	Lab	Lab	Rupa Huq	22,340	46.8%	13,995	22,340	8,345	3,105	6,056	5,444	2,479	47,769	60.9%
Ealing North	LND	LND	Lab	Lab	James Murray	20,663	47.8%	12,489	20,663	8,144	3,948	2,543	4,056	3,878	43,202	57.8%
Ealing Southall	LND	LND	Lab	Lab	Deirdre Costigan	23,000	49.1%	15,793	23,000	7,207	2,585	2,832	4,356	6,836	46,816	59.5%
Earley and Woodley	BRK	SE	Con	Lab	Yuan Yang	18,209	39.7%	848	18,209	17,361	—N/a	6,142	3,418	784	45,914	62.4%
Easington	DUR	NE	Lab	Lab	Grahame Morris	16,774	48.9%	6,542	16,774	3,753	10,232	811	1,173	1,581	34,385	49.5%
East Grinstead and Uckfield	WSX	SE	Con	Con	Mims Davies	19,319	38.3%	8,480	10,440	19,319	—N/a	10,839	5,277	4,518	50,393	66.9%
East Ham	LND	LND	Lab	Lab	Stephen Timms	19,570	51.6%	12,863	19,570	3,876	1,340	1,210	4,226	7,670	37,892	47.8%
East Hampshire	HAM	SE	Con	Con	Damian Hinds	18,509	36.9%	1,275	4,967	18,509	6,476	17,234	2,404	516	50,106	70.8%
East Surrey	SRY	SE	Con	Con	Claire Coutinho	17,502	35.6%	7,450	10,052	17,502	8,380	8,833	2,957	1,472	49,196	67.1%
East Thanet	KEN	SE	Con	Lab	Polly Billington	17,054	39.9%	6,971	17,054	10,083	8,591	1,365	4,590	1,030	42,713	57.0%
East Wiltshire	WIL	SW	Con	Con	Danny Kruger	16,849	35.7%	4,716	12,133	16,849	7,885	8,204	1,844	278	47,193	63.6%
East Worthing and Shoreham	WSX	SE	Con	Lab	Tom Rutland	22,120	45.1%	9,519	22,120	12,601	7,169	3,180	3,246	762	49,078	65.7%
Eastbourne	SXE	SE	Con	LD	Josh Babarinde	23,742	52.1%	12,204	2,689	11,538	6,061	23,742	1,424	154	45,608	62.8%
Eastleigh	HAM	SE	Con	LD	Liz Jarvis	15,970	34.4%	1,546	7,005	14,424	6,151	15,970	2,403	467	46,420	66.3%
Edmonton and Winchmore Hill	LND	LND	Lab	Lab	Kate Osamor	20,520	50.0%	12,632	20,520	7,888	3,501	2,721	3,681	2,734	41,045	54.2%
Ellesmere Port and Bromborough	CHS	NW	Lab	Lab	Justin Madders	24,186	57.6%	16,908	24,186	5,210	7,278	2,328	2,706	256	41,964	59.3%
Eltham and Chislehurst	LND	LND	Lab	Lab	Clive Efford	20,069	44.0%	8,429	20,069	11,640	7,428	2,423	3,079	927	45,566	61.6%
Ely and East Cambridgeshire	CAM	E	Con	LD	Charlotte Cane	17,127	32.7%	495	9,160	16,632	6,443	17,127	2,359	648	52,369	66.2%
Enfield North	LND	LND	Lab	Lab	Feryal Clark	21,368	49.1%	12,736	21,368	8,632	5,146	2,517	3,713	2,116	43,492	55.2%
Epping Forest	ESS	E	Con	Con	Neil Hudson	18,038	43.2%	5,682	12,356	18,038	—N/a	5,268	2,486	3,605	41,753	57.8%
Epsom and Ewell	SRY	SE	Con	LD	Helen Maguire	20,674	37.9%	3,686	8,325	16,988	5,795	20,674	1,745	998	54,525	71.3%
Erewash	DBY	EM	Con	Lab	Adam Thompson	17,224	39.9%	5,859	17,224	11,365	9,162	2,426	2,478	351	43,181	60.1%
Erith and Thamesmead	LND	LND	Lab	Lab	Abena Oppong-Asare	22,246	55.1%	16,032	22,246	5,564	5,944	1,872	3,482	1,271	40,379	51.3%
Esher and Walton	SRY	SE	Con	LD	Monica Harding	28,315	52.6%	12,003	2,846	16,312	4,777	28,315	1,396	234	53,880	72.8%
Exeter	DEV	SW	Lab	Lab	Steve Race	18,225	45.3%	11,937	18,225	6,288	4,914	4,201	5,907	660	40,195	59.3%
Exmouth and Exeter East	DEV	SW	Con	Con	David Reed	14,728	28.7%	121	14,607	14,728	7,085	11,387	2,331	1,178	51,478	64.2%
Fareham and Waterlooville	HAM	SE	Con	Con	Suella Braverman	17,561	35.0%	6,079	11,482	17,561	9,084	9,533	2,036	427	50,123	65.1%
Farnham and Bordon	HAM	SE	Con	Con	Gregory Stafford	18,951	35.8%	1,349	7,328	18,951	6,217	17,602	2,496	421	53,015	69.8%
Faversham and Mid Kent	KEN	SE	Con	Con	Helen Whately	14,816	31.8%	1,469	13,347	14,816	9,884	4,158	4,218	171	46,594	62.7%
Feltham and Heston	LND	LND	Lab	Lab	Seema Malhotra	16,139	41.5%	7,944	16,139	8,195	5,130	1,821	2,543	5,059	38,494	50.5%
Filton and Bradley Stoke	GLS	SW	Con	Lab	Claire Hazelgrove	22,905	45.5%	10,000	22,905	12,905	6,819	3,596	4,142	—N/a	50,367	64.9%
Finchley and Golders Green	LND	LND	Con	Lab	Sarah Sackman	21,857	44.3%	4,581	21,857	17,276	2,598	3,375	3,107	1,076	49,289	63.6%
Folkestone and Hythe	KEN	SE	Con	Lab	Tony Vaughan	15,020	34.7%	3,729	15,020	11,291	10,685	1,736	3,954	560	43,246	61.7%
Forest of Dean	GLS	SW	Con	Lab	Matt Bishop	16,373	34.0%	278	16,373	16,095	8,194	2,604	4,735	90	48,091	66.0%
Frome and East Somerset	SOM	SW	Con	LD	Anna Sabine	16,580	35.5%	5,415	6,416	11,165	6,441	16,580	5,083	1,031	46,716	65.3%
Fylde	LAN	NW	Con	Con	Andrew Snowden	15,917	33.2%	561	15,356	15,917	8,295	2,120	1,560	4,712	48,105	62.2%
Gainsborough	LIN	EM	Con	Con	Edward Leigh	16,636	35.6%	3,532	13,104	16,636	9,916	5,001	1,832	196	46,685	61.6%
Gateshead Central and Whickham	TWR	NE	Lab	Lab	Mark Ferguson	18,245	45.4%	11,153	18,245	4,628	8,601	4,987	3,217	539	40,217	57.6%
Gedling	NTT	EM	Con	Lab	Michael Payne	23,278	47.8%	11,881	23,278	11,397	8,211	2,473	3,122	241	48,722	63.3%
Gillingham and Rainham	KEN	SE	Con	Lab	Naushabah Khan	15,562	37.8%	3,972	15,562	11,590	8,792	2,248	2,318	630	41,140	56.0%
Glastonbury and Somerton	SOM	SW	Con	LD	Sarah Dyke	20,364	42.7%	6,611	3,111	13,753	7,678	20,364	2,736	—N/a	47,642	65.0%
Gloucester	GLS	SW	Con	Lab	Alex McIntyre	16,472	36.1%	3,431	16,472	13,041	7,307	4,759	2,307	1,806	45,692	57.5%
Godalming and Ash	SRY	SE	Con	Con	Jeremy Hunt	23,293	42.6%	891	2,748	23,293	4,815	22,402	1,243	195	54,884	72.1%
Goole and Pocklington	HUM	YTH	Con	Con	David Davis	18,981	38.2%	3,572	15,409	18,981	9,054	3,380	2,451	467	49,742	62.2%
Gorton and Denton	GTM	NW	Lab	Lab	Andrew Gwynne	18,555	50.8%	13,413	18,555	2,888	5,142	1,399	4,810	3,766	36,735	47.8%
Gosport	HAM	SE	Con	Con	Caroline Dinenage	17,830	40.3%	6,066	11,776	17,830	7,983	4,039	1,948	701	44,277	60.4%
Grantham and Bourne	LIN	EM	Con	Con	Gareth Davies	16,770	36.4%	4,496	12,274	16,770	9,393	2,027	2,570	3,091	46,275	62.9%
Gravesham	KEN	SE	Con	Lab	Lauren Sullivan	16,623	38.5%	2,712	16,623	13,911	8,910	1,534	2,254	—N/a	43,232	59.1%
Great Grimsby and Cleethorpes	HUM	YTH	Con	Lab	Melanie Onn	15,336	41.9%	4,803	15,336	8,269	10,533	1,036	1,115	330	36,619	48.1%
Great Yarmouth	NFK	E	Con	Ref	Rupert Lowe	14,385	35.3%	1,426	12,959	10,034	14,385	1,102	1,736	532	40,748	55.6%
Greenwich and Woolwich	LND	LND	Lab	Lab	Matthew Pennycook	23,999	56.2%	18,366	23,999	4,863	3,305	3,865	5,633	1,054	42,719	58.5%
Guildford	SRY	SE	Con	LD	Zöe Franklin	22,937	47.5%	8,429	3,931	14,508	4,395	22,937	2,268	255	48,294	68.3%
Hackney North and Stoke Newington	LND	LND	Lab	Lab	Diane Abbott	24,355	59.5%	15,080	24,355	3,457	1,283	1,562	9,275	1,027	40,959	53.2%
Hackney South and Shoreditch	LND	LND	Lab	Lab	Meg Hillier	24,724	59.3%	14,737	24,724	2,076	1,601	1,996	9,987	1,317	41,701	53.7%
Halesowen	WMD	WM	Con	Lab	Alex Ballinger	15,023	38.9%	4,364	15,023	10,659	8,484	2,261	2,151	—N/a	38,578	56.3%
Halifax	WYK	YTH	Lab	Lab	Kate Dearden	14,135	35.1%	6,269	14,135	7,866	7,811	2,359	4,133	3,910	40,363	51.9%
Hamble Valley	HAM	SE	Con	Con	Paul Holmes	19,671	36.4%	4,802	8,753	19,671	8,216	14,869	2,310	185	54,004	67.1%
Hammersmith and Chiswick	LND	LND	Lab	Lab	Andy Slaughter	24,073	52.3%	15,290	24,073	8,783	2,929	4,292	4,468	1,476	46,021	60.7%
Hampstead and Highgate	LND	LND	Lab	Lab	Tulip Siddiq	23,432	48.3%	13,970	23,432	8,462	2,940	6,181	6,630	905	48,550	60.7%
Harborough, Oadby and Wigston	LEI	EM	Con	Con	Neil O'Brien	18,614	36.9%	2,378	16,236	18,614	6,332	4,732	4,269	203	50,386	65.4%
Harlow	ESS	E	Con	Lab	Chris Vince	16,313	37.6%	2,504	16,313	13,809	9,461	1,350	2,267	157	43,357	58.1%
Harpenden and Berkhamsted	HRT	E	Con	LD	Victoria Collins	27,282	50.2%	10,708	4,061	16,574	4,245	27,282	1,951	223	54,336	75.2%
Harrogate and Knaresborough	NYK	YTH	Con	LD	Tom Gordon	23,976	46.1%	8,238	4,153	15,738	5,679	23,976	1,762	756	52,064	66.8%
Harrow East	LND	LND	Con	Con	Bob Blackman	25,466	53.3%	11,680	13,786	25,466	2,188	1,511	2,006	2,820	47,777	62.4%
Harrow West	LND	LND	Lab	Lab	Gareth Thomas	19,833	43.8%	6,642	19,833	13,191	2,639	2,404	2,438	4,736	45,241	56.6%
Hartlepool	DUR	NE	Con	Lab	Jonathan Brash	16,414	46.2%	7,698	16,414	7,767	8,716	572	834	1,208	35,511	49.7%
Harwich and North Essex	ESS	E	Con	Con	Bernard Jenkin	16,522	34.4%	1,162	15,360	16,522	9,806	3,561	2,794	—N/a	48,043	62.8%
Hastings and Rye	SXE	SE	Con	Lab	Helena Dollimore	19,134	41.6%	8,653	19,134	10,481	7,401	2,586	5,761	627	45,990	60.6%
Havant	HAM	SE	Con	Con	Alan Mak	12,986	30.8%	92	12,894	12,986	9,959	3,275	2,861	211	42,186	58.3%
Hayes and Harlington	LND	LND	Lab	Lab	John McDonnell	20,405	53.3%	12,031	20,405	8,374	4,114	1,316	2,131	1,975	38,315	51.5%
Hazel Grove	GTM	NW	Con	LD	Lisa Smart	17,328	37.7%	12,235	10,828	9,011	6,955	17,328	1,763	113	45,998	63.1%
Hemel Hempstead	HRT	E	Con	Lab	David Taylor	16,844	38.2%	4,857	16,844	11,987	7,689	5,096	2,492	—N/a	44,108	62.1%
Hendon	LND	LND	Con	Lab	David Pinto-Duschinsky	15,855	38.4%	15	15,855	15,840	3,038	1,966	2,667	1,890	41,256	55.1%
Henley and Thame	OXF	SE	Con	LD	Freddie Van Mierlo	23,904	45.0%	6,267	3,574	17,637	5,213	23,904	2,008	821	53,157	72.1%
Hereford and South Herefordshire	HFR	WM	Con	Con	Jesse Norman	14,871	32.6%	1,279	13,592	14,871	8,395	5,325	3,175	214	45,572	63.1%
Herne Bay and Sandwich	KEN	SE	Con	Con	Roger Gale	17,243	35.3%	2,499	14,744	17,243	10,602	2,709	3,529	—N/a	48,827	62.7%
Hertford and Stortford	HRT	E	Con	Lab	Josh Dean	20,808	38.5%	4,748	20,808	16,060	8,325	4,167	4,373	276	54,009	68.4%
Hertsmere	HRT	E	Con	Con	Oliver Dowden	21,451	44.7%	7,992	13,459	21,451	6,584	3,710	2,267	536	48,007	65.3%
Hexham	NBL	NE	Con	Lab	Joe Morris	23,988	46.3%	3,713	23,988	20,275	—N/a	2,376	2,467	2,722	51,828	67.8%
Heywood and Middleton North	GTM	NW	Lab	Lab	Elsie Blundell	15,069	40.6%	6,082	15,069	6,423	8,987	2,302	—N/a	4,349	37,130	50.6%
High Peak	DBY	EM	Con	Lab	Jon Pearce	22,533	45.8%	7,908	22,533	14,625	6,959	1,707	3,382	—N/a	49,226	66.2%
Hinckley and Bosworth	LEI	EM	Con	Con	Luke Evans	17,032	35.6%	5,408	8,601	17,032	8,817	11,624	1,514	211	47,799	62.5%
Hitchin	HRT	E	Con	Lab	Alistair Strathern	23,067	43.9%	8,109	23,067	14,958	6,760	4,913	2,631	181	52,510	69.2%
Holborn and St Pancras	LND	LND	Lab	Lab	Keir Starmer	18,884	48.9%	11,572	18,884	2,776	2,371	2,236	4,030	8,305	38,602	54.2%
Honiton and Sidmouth	DEV	SW	Con	LD	Richard Foord	23,007	45.4%	6,700	2,947	16,307	6,289	23,007	1,394	711	50,655	67.1%
Hornchurch and Upminster	LND	LND	Con	Con	Julia Lopez	15,260	32.5%	1,943	12,939	15,260	13,317	2,381	2,620	394	46,911	62.2%
Hornsey and Friern Barnet	LND	LND	Lab	Lab	Catherine West	28,535	58.7%	21,475	28,535	4,011	1,989	6,099	7,060	948	48,929	68.7%
Horsham	WSX	SE	Con	LD	John Milne	21,632	39.0%	2,517	5,979	19,115	6,116	21,632	2,137	520	55,499	70.2%
Houghton and Sunderland South	TWR	NE	Lab	Lab	Bridget Phillipson	18,837	47.1%	7,168	18,837	5,514	11,668	2,290	1,723	—N/a	40,032	51.0%
Hove and Portslade	SXE	SE	Lab	Lab	Peter Kyle	27,209	52.4%	19,881	27,209	6,630	4,558	3,046	7,418	3,048	51,909	70.1%
Huddersfield	WYK	YTH	Lab	Lab	Harpreet Uppal	15,101	37.6%	4,533	15,101	6,559	6,196	1,741	10,568	—N/a	40,165	51.6%
Huntingdon	CAM	E	Con	Con	Ben Obese-Jecty	18,257	35.1%	1,499	16,758	18,257	8,039	4,821	3,042	1,123	52,234	65.8%
Hyndburn	LAN	NW	Con	Lab	Sarah Smith	12,186	33.5%	1,687	12,186	10,499	7,541	1,210	4,938	—N/a	36,570	54.2%
Ilford North	LND	LND	Lab	Lab	Wes Streeting	15,647	33.4%	528	15,647	9,619	3,621	1,088	1,794	15,119	47,008	59.6%
Ilford South	LND	LND	Lab	Lab	Jas Athwal	16,537	40.2%	6,896	16,537	6,142	2,329	1,340	3,437	11,385	41,338	50.8%
Ipswich	SFK	E	Con	Lab	Jack Abbott	19,099	43.3%	7,403	19,099	11,696	7,027	2,241	3,652	356	44,071	58.5%
Isle of Wight East	IOW	SE	Con	Con	Joe Robertson	10,427	30.6%	3,323	6,264	10,427	7,104	3,550	6,313	420	34,078	61.0%
Isle of Wight West	IOW	SE	Con	Lab	Richard Quigley	13,240	38.6%	3,177	13,240	10,063	5,834	2,726	2,310	117	34,290	61.9%
Islington North	LND	LND	Lab	Ind.	Jeremy Corbyn	24,120	49.2%	7,247	16,873	1,950	1,710	1,661	2,660	24,152	49,006	67.3%
Islington South and Finsbury	LND	LND	Lab	Lab	Emily Thornberry	22,946	53.7%	15,455	22,946	3,584	3,388	4,045	7,491	1,300	42,754	57.7%
Jarrow and Gateshead East	TWR	NE	Lab	Lab	Kate Osborne	18,856	51.3%	8,946	18,856	3,354	9,892	1,740	2,384	502	36,728	52.3%
Keighley and Ilkley	WYK	YTH	Con	Con	Robbie Moore	18,589	40.3%	1,625	16,964	18,589	4,782	970	2,447	2,425	46,186	62.1%
Kenilworth and Southam	WAR	WM	Con	Con	Jeremy Wright	19,395	36.4%	6,574	12,821	19,395	6,920	10,464	3,125	595	53,320	71.2%
Kensington and Bayswater	LND	LND	Lab	Lab	Joe Powell	17,025	40.6%	2,903	17,025	14,122	2,514	2,910	2,732	2,605	41,908	54.2%
Kettering	NTH	EM	Con	Lab	Rosie Wrighting	18,009	35.9%	3,900	18,009	14,189	8,468	1,357	7,004	1,204	50,231	63.3%
Kingston and Surbiton	LND	LND	LD	LD	Ed Davey	25,870	51.1%	17,235	6,561	8,635	4,787	25,870	3,009	1,802	50,664	65.5%
Kingston upon Hull East	HUM	YTH	Lab	Lab	Karl Turner	13,047	43.8%	3,920	13,047	2,715	9,127	3,252	1,675	—N/a	29,816	42.2%
Kingston upon Hull North and Cottingham	HUM	YTH	Lab	Lab	Diana Johnson	18,480	48.3%	10,769	18,480	4,897	7,801	3,246	2,322	1,482	38,228	50.8%
Kingston upon Hull West and Haltemprice	HUM	YTH	Con	Lab	Emma Hardy	17,875	46.8%	8,979	17,875	6,924	8,896	2,625	1,748	110	38,178	52.2%
Kingswinford and South Staffordshire	STS	WM	Con	Con	Mike Wood	18,199	40.3%	6,303	11,896	18,199	9,928	2,080	2,077	1,000	45,326	63.1%
Knowsley	MSY	NW	Lab	Lab	Anneliese Midgley	24,243	67.3%	18,319	24,243	1,496	5,924	1,232	2,772	380	36,047	50.1%
Lancaster and Wyre	LAN	NW	Con	Lab	Cat Smith	19,315	44.9%	9,253	19,315	10,062	6,866	1,529	5,236	—N/a	43,008	57.5%
Leeds Central and Headingley	WYK	YTH	Lab	Lab	Alex Sobel	15,853	50.2%	8,422	15,853	2,237	2,399	2,611	7,431	1,064	31,595	44.8%
Leeds East	WYK	YTH	Lab	Lab	Richard Burgon	18,610	47.2%	11,265	18,610	6,898	7,345	1,445	3,506	1,584	39,517	51.8%
Leeds North East	WYK	YTH	Lab	Lab	Fabian Hamilton	23,260	51.5%	16,083	23,260	7,177	3,426	2,168	5,911	3,225	45,388	64.4%
Leeds North West	WYK	YTH	Con	Lab	Katie White	22,882	46.0%	11,896	22,882	10,986	5,935	5,641	3,231	1,102	49,953	69.6%
Leeds South	WYK	YTH	Lab	Lab	Hilary Benn	17,117	54.0%	11,279	17,117	4,172	—N/a	1,340	5,838	3,211	32,151	41.8%
Leeds South West and Morley	WYK	YTH	Con	Lab	Mark Sewards	17,681	44.0%	8,423	17,681	9,258	8,187	1,798	2,522	763	40,323	56.0%
Leeds West and Pudsey	WYK	YTH	Lab	Lab	Rachel Reeves	18,976	49.3%	12,392	18,976	6,584	6,281	1,743	3,794	1,116	38,494	55.0%
Leicester East	LEI	EM	Lab	Con	Shivani Raja	14,526	31.1%	4,426	10,100	14,526	2,611	6,329	2,143	11,005	46,714	61.0%
Leicester South	LEI	EM	Lab	Ind.	Shockat Adam	14,739	35.2%	979	13,760	4,820	2,470	1,425	3,826	15,536	41,837	59.0%
Leicester West	LEI	EM	Lab	Lab	Liz Kendall	15,798	44.6%	8,777	15,798	7,021	5,666	2,179	4,089	644	35,397	47.8%
Leigh and Atherton	GTM	NW	Con	Lab	Jo Platt	19,971	48.5%	8,881	19,971	6,483	11,090	1,597	1,653	376	41,170	51.5%
Lewes	SXE	SE	Con	LD	James MacCleary	26,895	50.6%	12,624	3,574	14,271	6,335	26,895	1,869	229	53,338	69.8%
Lewisham East	LND	LND	Lab	Lab	Janet Daby	23,646	58.2%	18,073	23,646	4,401	3,469	2,471	5,573	1,077	40,637	55.4%
Lewisham North	LND	LND	Lab	Lab	Vicky Foxcroft	15,782	57.7%	15,228	25,467	2,701	2,000	3,284	9,685	1,030	44,167	59.5%
Lewisham West and East Dulwich	LND	LND	Lab	Lab	Ellie Reeves	27,406	59.1%	18,397	27,406	3,477	2,234	3,558	9,009	730	46,414	66.9%
Leyton and Wanstead	LND	LND	Lab	Lab	Calvin Bailey	20,755	47.5%	13,964	20,755	4,846	2,475	2,815	6,791	6,050	43,732	61.2%
Lichfield	STS	WM	Con	Lab	Dave Robertson	17,232	35.1%	810	17,232	16,422	9,734	3,572	1,724	420	49,104	64.5%
Lincoln	LIN	EM	Con	Lab	Hamish Falconer	18,470	43.8%	8,793	18,470	9,677	7,602	2,580	2,751	1,080	42,160	58.3%
Liverpool Garston	MSY	NW	Lab	Lab	Maria Eagle	24,510	58.4%	20,104	24,510	2,943	4,406	3,239	2,816	4,078	41,993	60.6%
Liverpool Riverside	MSY	NW	Lab	Lab	Kim Johnson	20,039	61.9%	14,793	20,039	1,155	3,272	1,544	5,246	1,125	32,381	45.4%
Liverpool Walton	MSY	NW	Lab	Lab	Dan Carden	26,032	70.6%	20,245	26,032	1,282	5,787	945	2,388	452	36,886	53.2%
Liverpool Wavertree	MSY	NW	Lab	Lab	Paula Barker	23,077	58.0%	16,304	23,077	1,887	3,454	2,759	6,773	1,865	39,815	56.5%
Liverpool West Derby	MSY	NW	Lab	Lab	Ian Byrne	25,302	66.6%	20,423	25,302	1,566	4,879	1,276	2,647	2,336	38,006	54.3%
Loughborough	LEI	EM	Con	Lab	Jeevun Sandher	17,249	40.8%	4,960	17,249	12,289	7,204	2,561	2,956	—N/a	42,259	61.3%
Louth and Horncastle	LIN	EM	Con	Con	Victoria Atkins	17,441	37.5%	5,506	10,475	17,441	11,935	2,364	2,504	1,760	46,479	60.5%
Lowestoft	SFK	E	Con	Lab	Jessica Asato	14,464	34.6%	2,016	14,464	12,448	10,328	1,489	3,095	—N/a	41,824	56.3%
Luton North	BDF	E	Lab	Lab	Sarah Owen	14,677	37.9%	7,510	14,677	7,167	4,666	1,890	1,940	8,405	38,745	51.8%
Luton South and South Bedfordshire	BDF	E	Lab	Lab	Rachel Hopkins	13,593	35.4%	6,858	13,593	6,735	4,759	2,400	2,401	8,494	38,382	49.7%
Macclesfield	CHS	NW	Con	Lab	Tim Roca	24,672	46.7%	9,120	24,672	15,552	6,592	2,482	2,493	1,001	52,935	69.1%
Maidenhead	BRK	SE	Con	LD	Joshua Reynolds	21,895	43.5%	2,963	5,766	18,932	—N/a	21,895	1,996	1,740	50,329	67.0%
Maidstone and Malling	KEN	SE	Con	Con	Helen Grant	14,146	30.5%	1,674	12,472	14,146	9,316	6,375	3,727	353	46,389	60.7%
Makerfield	GTM	NW	Lab	Lab	Josh Simons	18,202	45.2%	5,399	18,202	4,379	12,803	2,735	1,776	368	40,398	52.5%
Maldon	ESS	E	Con	Con	John Whittingdale	19,374	38.9%	6,906	9,817	19,374	12,468	5,882	2,300	—N/a	49,841	63.7%
Manchester Central	GTM	NW	Lab	Lab	Lucy Powell	20,184	50.8%	13,797	20,184	2,823	4,760	3,051	6,387	2,520	39,725	46.6%
Manchester Rusholme	GTM	NW	Lab	Lab	Afzal Khan	15,054	51.9%	8,235	15,054	1,678	1,313	—N/a	6,819	4,169	29,033	40.0%
Manchester Withington	GTM	NW	Lab	Lab	Jeff Smith	22,066	52.9%	13,982	22,066	2,280	1,961	5,412	8,084	1,928	41,731	59.1%
Mansfield	NTT	EM	Con	Lab	Steve Yemm	16,048	39.1%	3,485	16,048	12,563	9,385	799	1,326	966	41,206	55.1%
Melksham and Devizes	WIL	SW	Con	LD	Brian Mathew	20,031	39.1%	2,401	4,587	17,630	6,726	20,031	2,229	—N/a	51,223	69.7%
Melton and Syston	LEI	EM	Con	Con	Edward Argar	17,526	38.1%	5,396	12,130	17,526	8,945	2,547	3,685	1,153	46,149	61.9%
Meriden and Solihull East	WMD	WM	Con	Con	Saqib Bhatti	16,792	38.1%	4,584	12,208	16,792	8,753	3,353	2,929	—N/a	44,198	59.8%
Mid Bedfordshire	BDF	E	Con	Con	Blake Stephenson	16,912	34.1%	1,321	15,591	16,912	8,594	4,068	2,584	1,872	49,621	65.8%
Mid Buckinghamshire	BKM	SE	Con	Con	Greg Smith	20,150	37.3%	5,872	9,171	20,150	6,926	14,278	2,942	484	54,951	71.3%
Mid Cheshire	CHS	NW	Con	Lab	Andrew Cooper	18,457	44.5%	8,927	18,457	9,530	7,967	2,465	1,967	1,123	41,624	59.0%
Mid Derbyshire	DBY	EM	Con	Lab	Jonathan Davies	17,346	36.5%	1,878	17,346	15,468	8,356	2,361	3,547	465	47,543	68.0%
Mid Dorset and North Poole	DOR	SW	Con	LD	Vikki Slade	21,442	43.3%	1,352	4,566	20,090	—N/a	21,442	2,355	1,061	49,514	65.8%
Mid Leicestershire	LEI	EM	Con	Con	Peter Bedford	17,735	36.9%	2,201	15,534	17,735	8,923	2,444	3,414	—N/a	48,235	63.3%
Mid Norfolk	NFK	E	Con	Con	George Freeman	16,770	36.5%	3,054	13,716	16,770	9,427	3,126	2,858	—N/a	45,897	61.1%
Mid Sussex	WSX	SE	Con	LD	Alison Bennett	21,136	39.6%	6,662	9,397	14,474	5,921	21,136	2,048	352	53,328	70.2%
Middlesbrough South and East Cleveland	NYK	NE	Con	Lab	Luke Myer	16,468	43.3%	214	16,468	16,254	—N/a	2,032	1,446	1,835	38,035	54.1%
Middlesbrough and Thornaby East	NYK	NE	Lab	Lab	Andy McDonald	16,238	47.2%	9,192	16,238	6,174	7,046	1,037	1,522	2,390	34,407	45.8%
Milton Keynes Central	BKM	SE	Con	Lab	Emily Darlington	20,209	42.3%	7,291	20,209	12,918	6,245	4,931	3,226	200	47,930	58.9%
Milton Keynes North	BKM	SE	Con	Lab	Chris Curtis	19,318	42.0%	5,430	19,318	13,888	6,164	3,365	3,242	—N/a	45,977	65.0%
Mitcham and Morden	LND	LND	Lab	Lab	Siobhain McDonagh	25,085	55.4%	18,761	25,085	6,324	4,135	3,622	4,635	1,454	45,255	58.6%
Morecambe and Lunesdale	LAN	NW	Con	Lab	Lizzi Collinge	19,603	40.8%	5,815	19,603	13,788	7,810	4,769	2,089	—N/a	48,059	62.9%
New Forest East	HAM	SE	Con	Con	Julian Lewis	17,412	38.5%	8,495	8,917	17,412	7,646	7,198	3,118	939	45,376	64.0%
New Forest West	HAM	SE	Con	Con	Desmond Swayne	16,412	35.4%	5,600	10,812	16,412	7,577	8,186	2,800	550	46,337	67.5%
Newark	NTT	EM	Con	Con	Robert Jenrick	20,968	39.2%	3,572	17,396	20,968	8,280	3,026	2,345	1,444	53,459	67.0%
Newbury	BRK	SE	Con	LD	Lee Dillon	19,645	40.1%	2,377	3,662	17,268	5,357	19,645	2,714	284	48,930	68.0%
Newcastle-under-Lyme	STS	WM	Con	Lab	Adam Jogee	15,992	40.4%	5,069	15,992	10,923	8,865	1,987	1,851	—N/a	39,618	58.4%
Newcastle upon Tyne Central and West	TWR	NE	Lab	Lab	Chi Onwurah	18,875	45.6%	11,060	18,875	4,228	7,815	1,946	3,228	5,263	41,355	53.8%
Newcastle upon Tyne East and Wallsend	TWR	NE	Lab	Lab	Mary Glindon	21,200	50.1%	12,817	21,200	3,522	8,383	2,965	5,257	994	42,321	55.5%
Newcastle upon Tyne North	TWR	NE	Lab	Lab	Catherine McKinnell	24,440	50.3%	17,762	24,440	6,678	5,933	5,936	5,035	595	48,617	65.0%
Newton Abbot	DEV	SW	Con	LD	Martin Wrigley	15,201	31.7%	2,246	7,115	12,955	8,494	15,201	2,083	2,144	47,992	65.0%
Newton Aycliffe and Spennymoor	DUR	NE	Con	Lab	Alan Strickland	18,394	46.2%	8,839	18,394	8,195	9,555	1,491	1,701	510	39,925	55.2%
Normanton and Hemsworth	WYK	YTH	Lab	Lab	Jon Trickett	17,275	47.5%	6,662	17,275	4,995	10,613	1,319	2,147	—N/a	36,349	48.1%
North Bedfordshire	BDF	E	Con	Con	Richard Fuller	19,981	38.8%	5,414	14,567	19,981	8,433	5,553	3,027	—N/a	51,561	65.5%
North Cornwall	CUL	SW	Con	LD	Ben Maguire	24,904	47.8%	10,767	2,958	14,137	8,444	24,904	1,335	277	52,055	66.9%
North Cotswolds	GLS	SW	Con	Con	Geoffrey Clifton-Brown	17,426	34.7%	3,357	8,593	17,426	6,502	14,069	3,191	448	50,229	68.6%
North Devon	DEV	SW	Con	LD	Ian Roome	21,820	42.4%	6,744	3,216	15,076	8,137	21,820	2,348	820	51,417	65.0%
North Dorset	DOR	SW	Con	Con	Simon Hoare	18,208	36.6%	1,589	4,370	18,208	7,894	16,619	2,082	510	49,683	68.4%
North Durham	DUR	NE	Lab	Lab	Luke Akehurst	16,562	39.8%	5,873	16,562	6,492	10,689	4,208	2,366	1,248	41,727	56.8%
North East Cambridgeshire	CAM	E	Con	Con	Steve Barclay	16,246	41.5%	7,189	8,008	16,246	9,057	2,716	2,001	1,148	39,176	54.8%
North East Derbyshire	DBY	EM	Con	Lab	Louise Jones	17,591	38.4%	1,753	17,591	15,838	7,899	2,159	2,271	108	46,149	62.6%
North East Hampshire	HAM	SE	Con	LD	Alex Brewer	21,178	38.1%	634	5,057	20,544	6,673	21,178	1,425	683	55,560	72.2%
North East Hertfordshire	HRT	E	Con	Lab	Chris Hinchliff	18,358	35.0%	1,923	18,358	16,435	8,462	5,463	3,802	—N/a	52,520	67.6%
North East Somerset and Hanham	SOM	SW	Con	Lab	Dan Norris	20,739	40.6%	5,319	20,739	15,420	7,424	3,878	3,222	442	51,125	69.2%
North Herefordshire	HFR	WM	Con	Grn	Ellie Chowns	21,736	43.2%	5,894	3,205	15,842	8,048	1,436	21,736	95	50,362	69.2%
North Norfolk	NFK	E	Con	LD	Steffan Aquarone	19,488	41.4%	2,585	2,878	16,903	6,368	19,488	1,406	—N/a	50,219	65.9%
North Northumberland	NBL	NE	Con	Lab	David Smith	17,855	36.6%	5,067	17,855	12,788	7,688	5,169	1,743	3,600	48,843	65.9%
North Shropshire	SAL	WM	Con	LD	Helen Morgan	26,214	52.9%	15,311	3,423	10,903	7,687	26,214	1,234	133	49,594	63.9%
North Somerset	SOM	SW	Con	Lab	Sadik Al-Hassan	19,138	35.6%	639	19,138	18,499	5,602	7,121	3,273	133	53,766	72.2%
North Warwickshire and Bedworth	WAR	WM	Con	Lab	Rachel Taylor	14,727	36.0%	2,198	14,727	12,529	10,701	1,228	1,755	—N/a	40,940	58.7%
North West Cambridgeshire	CAM	E	Con	Lab	Sam Carling	14,785	33.3%	39	14,785	14,746	8,741	3,192	2,960	—N/a	44,424	58.5%
North West Essex	ESS	E	Con	Con	Kemi Badenoch	19,360	35.6%	2,610	16,750	19,360	7,668	6,055	2,846	1,707	54,386	68.2%
North West Hampshire	HAM	SE	Con	Con	Kit Malthouse	17,770	35.0%	3,288	14,482	17,770	7,734	7,626	2,745	466	50,823	64.6%
North West Leicestershire	LEI	EM	Con	Lab	Amanda Hack	16,871	34.7%	1,012	16,871	15,859	9,678	1,629	2,831	1,704	48,572	62.5%
North West Norfolk	NFK	E	Con	Con	James Wild	16,097	36.1%	4,954	11,143	16,097	8,697	6,492	2,137	—N/a	44,566	59.9%
Northampton North	NTH	EM	Con	Lab	Lucy Rigby	18,209	43.5%	9,014	18,209	9,195	7,010	2,251	2,558	2,590	41,813	55.3%
Northampton South	NTH	EM	Con	Lab	Mike Reader	16,890	38.5%	4,071	16,890	12,819	8,210	3,193	2,398	394	43,904	59.4%
Norwich North	NFK	E	Con	Lab	Alice MacDonald	20,794	45.4%	10,850	20,794	9,944	8,229	2,073	4,372	353	45,765	62.1%
Norwich South	NFK	E	Lab	Lab	Clive Lewis	21,484	47.6%	13,239	21,484	5,806	5,227	3,577	8,245	756	45,095	59.1%
Nottingham East	NTT	EM	Lab	Lab	Nadia Whittome	19,494	53.6%	15,162	19,494	3,925	3,578	1,741	4,332	3,291	36,401	52.5%
Nottingham North and Kimberley	NTT	EM	Lab	Lab	Alex Norris	16,480	47.1%	9,427	16,480	6,787	7,053	1,336	3,351	—N/a	35,007	47.5%
Nottingham South	NTT	EM	Lab	Lab	Lilian Greenwood	15,579	47.4%	10,294	15,579	5,285	4,936	2,059	2,923	2,097	32,879	51.2%
Nuneaton	WAR	WM	Con	Lab	Jodie Gosling	15,216	36.9%	3,479	15,216	11,737	9,059	1,340	2,894	967	41,214	57.4%
Old Bexley and Sidcup	LND	LND	Con	Con	Louie French	17,910	37.6%	3,548	14,362	17,910	10,384	1,927	2,601	449	47,633	65.1%
Oldham East and Saddleworth	GTM	NW	Lab	Lab	Debbie Abrahams	14,091	35.2%	6,357	14,091	6,838	7,734	3,386	1,490	6,526	40,065	54.5%
Oldham West, Chadderton and Royton	GTM	NW	Lab	Lab	Jim McMahon	13,232	34.3%	4,976	13,232	4,066	6,848	1,271	1,857	11,299	38,573	50.7%
Orpington	LND	LND	Con	Con	Gareth Bacon	17,504	38.0%	5,118	12,386	17,504	8,896	4,728	2,319	240	46,073	64.6%
Ossett and Denby Dale	WYK	YTH	Con	Lab	Jade Botterill	17,232	39.3%	4,542	17,232	12,690	9,224	1,785	2,132	810	43,873	60.7%
Oxford East	OXF	SE	Lab	Lab	Anneliese Dodds	19,541	49.7%	14,465	19,541	4,739	—N/a	3,437	5,076	6,548	39,341	54.8%
Oxford West and Abingdon	OXF	SE	LD	LD	Layla Moran	23,414	50.9%	14,894	5,981	8,520	4,164	23,414	3,236	683	45,998	65.9%
Peckham	LND	LND	Lab	Lab	Miatta Fahnbulleh	22,813	58.8%	15,228	22,813	2,276	1,790	2,724	7,585	1,609	38,644	53.8%
Pendle and Clitheroe	LAN	NW	Con	Lab	Jonathan Hinder	16,129	34.5%	902	16,129	15,227	8,171	2,039	1,421	3,767	46,754	59.4%
Penistone and Stocksbridge	SYK	YTH	Con	Lab	Marie Tidball	19,169	43.6%	8,739	19,169	10,430	9,456	2,866	2,044	—N/a	44,132	62.4%
Penrith and Solway	CMA	NW	Con	Lab	Markus Campbell-Savours	19,986	40.6%	5,257	19,986	14,729	7,624	4,742	1,730	470	49,281	63.2%
Peterborough	CAM	E	Con	Lab	Andrew Pakes	13,418	32.0%	118	13,418	13,300	5,379	1,746	2,542	5,487	41,872	57.1%
Plymouth Moor View	DEV	SW	Con	Lab	Fred Thomas	17,665	41.2%	5,604	17,665	12,061	9,670	1,766	1,694	—N/a	42,856	57.3%
Plymouth Sutton and Devonport	DEV	SW	Lab	Lab	Luke Pollard	20,795	49.4%	13,328	20,795	6,873	7,467	2,441	3,186	1,333	42,095	56.0%
Pontefract, Castleford and Knottingley	WYK	YTH	Lab	Lab	Yvette Cooper	17,089	47.5%	6,630	17,089	5,406	10,459	1,213	1,651	139	35,957	48.2%
Poole	DOR	SW	Con	Lab	Neil Duncan-Jordan	14,168	31.8%	18	14,168	14,150	7,429	5,507	2,218	1,023	44,495	61.4%
Poplar and Limehouse	LND	LND	Lab	Lab	Apsana Begum	18,535	43.1%	12,560	18,535	4,738	3,403	4,189	5,975	6,211	43,051	51.2%
Portsmouth North	HAM	SE	Con	Lab	Amanda Martin	14,495	34.8%	780	14,495	13,715	8,501	3,031	1,851	—N/a	41,593	59.1%
Portsmouth South	HAM	SE	Lab	Lab	Stephen Morgan	18,857	48.4%	13,155	18,857	5,643	5,702	4,886	3,107	733	38,928	52.8%
Preston	LAN	NW	Lab	Lab	Mark Hendrick	14,006	35.0%	5,291	14,006	5,212	5,738	3,195	1,751	10,091	40,132	51.7%
Putney	LND	LND	Lab	Lab	Fleur Anderson	20,952	49.0%	10,941	20,952	10,011	2,681	5,189	3,182	722	42,737	67.8%
Queen's Park and Maida Vale	LND	LND	Lab	Lab	Georgia Gould	20,126	52.5%	14,913	20,126	5,088	2,106	3,417	5,213	2,393	38,613	50.7%
Rawmarsh and Conisbrough	SYK	YTH	Lab	Lab	John Healey	16,612	49.0%	6,908	16,612	4,496	9,704	1,137	1,687	268	33,904	49.0%
Rayleigh and Wickford	ESS	E	Con	Con	Mark Francois	17,756	37.0%	5,621	11,823	17,756	12,135	4,068	2,196	—N/a	47,978	62.7%
Reading Central	BRK	SE	Lab	Lab	Matt Rodda	21,598	47.7%	12,637	21,598	8,961	3,904	3,963	6,417	448	45,291	61.5%
Reading West and Mid Berkshire	BRK	SE	Con	Lab	Olivia Bailey	16,273	35.0%	1,361	16,273	14,912	6,260	5,103	3,169	834	46,551	67.6%
Redcar	NYK	NE	Con	Lab	Anna Turley	15,663	41.0%	3,323	15,663	12,340	7,216	1,542	1,270	169	38,200	54.4%
Redditch	WOR	WM	Con	Lab	Chris Bloore	14,810	34.9%	789	14,810	14,021	8,516	2,165	2,098	765	42,375	59.7%
Reigate	SRY	SE	Con	Con	Rebecca Paul	18,822	35.4%	3,187	15,635	18,822	7,240	6,773	4,691	—N/a	53,161	69.0%
Ribble Valley	LAN	NW	Con	Lab	Maya Ellis	18,177	34.9%	856	18,177	17,321	8,524	5,001	1,727	1,273	52,023	64.6%
Richmond Park	LND	LND	LD	LD	Sarah Olney	28,528	55.4%	17,155	5,048	11,373	3,258	28,528	2,728	582	51,517	69.3%
Richmond and Northallerton	NYK	YTH	Con	Con	Rishi Sunak	23,059	47.5%	12,185	10,874	23,059	7,142	4,322	2,058	1,071	48,636	65.7%
Rochdale	GTM	NW	Lab	Lab	Paul Waugh	13,027	32.8%	1,440	13,027	4,273	6,773	2,816	1,212	11,587	39,688	54.7%
Rochester and Strood	KEN	SE	Con	Lab	Lauren Edwards	15,403	36.2%	2,293	15,403	12,473	9,966	1,894	2,427	435	42,598	57.4%
Romford	LND	LND	Con	Con	Andrew Rosindell	15,339	34.8%	1,463	13,876	15,339	9,624	1,895	2,220	1,093	44,047	60.4%
Romsey and Southampton North	HAM	SE	Con	Con	Caroline Nokes	19,893	39.8%	2,191	4,640	19,893	5,716	17,702	1,893	183	50,027	69.6%
Rossendale and Darwen	LAN	NW	Con	Lab	Andy MacNae	18,247	40.9%	5,628	18,247	12,619	9,695	1,241	2,325	491	44,618	60.0%
Rother Valley	SYK	YTH	Con	Lab	Jake Richards	16,023	38.5%	998	16,023	15,025	7,679	1,175	1,706	—N/a	41,712	59.9%
Rotherham	SYK	YTH	Lab	Lab	Sarah Champion	16,671	45.1%	5,490	16,671	—N/a	11,181	2,824	2,632	3,624	37,296	48.6%
Rugby	WAR	WM	Con	Lab	John Slinger	19,533	39.9%	4,428	19,533	15,105	8,225	3,252	2,556	333	49,004	65.4%
Ruislip, Northwood and Pinner	LND	LND	Con	Con	David Simmonds	21,366	45.4%	7,581	13,785	21,366	4,671	4,343	2,926	—N/a	47,091	65.7%
Runcorn and Helsby	CHS	NW	Lab	Lab	Mike Amesbury	22,358	52.9%	14,696	22,358	6,756	7,662	2,149	2,715	595	42,406	59.7%
Runnymede and Weybridge	SRY	SE	Con	Con	Ben Spencer	18,442	38.2%	7,627	9,963	18,442	6,419	10,815	1,954	660	48,253	65.6%
Rushcliffe	NTT	EM	Con	Lab	James Naish	25,291	43.6%	7,426	25,291	17,865	6,353	3,133	4,367	735	57,959	73.0%
Rutland and Stamford	LIN	EM	Con	Con	Alicia Kearns	21,248	43.7%	10,394	10,854	21,248	7,008	6,252	2,806	409	48,577	67.7%
Salford	GTM	NW	Lab	Lab	Rebecca Long-Bailey	21,132	53.2%	15,101	21,132	3,583	6,031	2,752	5,188	1,018	39,889	47.5%
Salisbury	WIL	SW	Con	Con	John Glen	17,110	34.1%	3,807	13,303	17,110	5,235	11,825	2,115	585	50,173	69.9%
Scarborough and Whitby	NYK	YTH	Con	Lab	Alison Hume	17,758	40.2%	5,408	17,758	12,350	9,657	1,899	1,719	838	44,221	59.3%
Scunthorpe	HUM	YTH	Con	Lab	Nic Dakin	15,484	39.7%	3,542	15,484	11,942	8,163	942	1,218	1,302	39,157	52.9%
Sefton Central	MSY	NW	Lab	Lab	Bill Esterson	26,772	56.4%	18,282	26,772	8,490	5,767	2,630	3,294	496	47,449	63.9%
Selby	NYK	YTH	Con	Lab	Keir Mather	22,788	46.3%	10,195	22,788	12,593	9,565	1,792	2,484	—N/a	49,222	63.0%
Sevenoaks	KEN	SE	Con	Con	Laura Trott	18,328	36.7%	5,440	6,802	18,328	9,341	12,888	2,033	507	49,899	67.7%
Sheffield Brightside and Hillsborough	SYK	YTH	Lab	Lab	Gill Furniss	16,301	51.6%	11,600	16,301	4,069	—N/a	1,694	4,701	4,847	32,141	44.9%
Sheffield Central	SYK	YTH	Lab	Lab	Abtisam Mohamed	16,569	52.1%	8,286	16,569	2,339	—N/a	2,174	8,283	2,438	32,090	52.5%
Sheffield Hallam	SYK	YTH	Lab	Lab	Olivia Blake	23,875	46.3%	8,189	23,875	6,205	—N/a	15,686	4,491	1,344	51,601	70.8%
Sheffield Heeley	SYK	YTH	Lab	Lab	Louise Haigh	21,230	55.2%	15,304	21,230	5,242	—N/a	3,863	5,926	2,185	39,084	52.3%
Sheffield South East	SYK	YTH	Lab	Lab	Clive Betts	18,710	52.3%	12,458	18,710	6,252	—N/a	3,421	3,158	4,230	35,771	48.2%
Sherwood Forest	NTT	EM	Con	Lab	Michelle Welsh	18,841	38.7%	5,443	18,841	13,398	11,320	1,838	2,216	1,047	48,660	61.7%
Shipley	WYK	YTH	Con	Lab	Anna Dixon	21,738	45.0%	8,603	21,738	13,135	7,238	1,341	3,605	1,246	48,303	65.2%
Shrewsbury	SAL	WM	Con	Lab	Julia Buckley	22,932	44.3%	11,355	22,932	11,577	7,524	6,722	2,387	418	51,765	67.3%
Sittingbourne and Sheppey	KEN	SE	Con	Lab	Kevin McKenna	11,919	29.1%	355	11,919	11,564	10,512	1,321	1,692	3,990	40,998	51.9%
Skipton and Ripon	NYK	YTH	Con	Con	Julian Smith	18,833	35.2%	1,650	17,183	18,833	8,516	4,194	3,446	1,278	53,450	67.5%
Sleaford and North Hykeham	LIN	EM	Con	Con	Caroline Johnson	17,348	35.7%	4,346	13,002	17,348	10,484	2,264	2,435	3,032	48,565	64.2%
Slough	BRK	SE	Lab	Lab	Tan Dhesi	14,666	33.9%	3,647	14,666	7,457	3,352	2,060	1,873	13,870	43,278	53.2%
Smethwick	WMD	WM	Lab	Lab	Gurinder Josan	16,858	48.0%	11,188	16,858	4,546	5,670	1,018	2,741	4,282	35,125	48.2%
Solihull West and Shirley	WMD	WM	Con	Con	Neil Shastri-Hurst	16,284	34.7%	4,620	11,664	16,284	7,149	7,916	3,270	594	46,877	65.3%
South Basildon and East Thurrock	ESS	E	Con	Ref	James McMurdock	12,178	30.8%	98	12,080	10,159	12,178	1,071	1,718	2,343	39,549	54.4%
South Cambridgeshire	CAM	E	Con	LD	Pippa Heylings	25,704	46.8%	10,641	6,106	15,063	4,897	25,704	2,656	459	54,885	71.0%
South Cotswolds	GLS	SW	Con	LD	Roz Savage	22,961	43.9%	4,973	3,942	17,988	5,146	22,961	1,564	686	52,287	72.7%
South Derbyshire	DBY	EM	Con	Lab	Samantha Niblett	17,734	38.8%	4,168	17,734	13,566	8,979	2,134	1,941	1,383	45,737	62.0%
South Devon	DEV	SW	Con	LD	Caroline Voaden	22,540	46.0%	7,127	3,066	15,413	6,363	22,540	1,497	125	49,004	67.8%
South Dorset	DOR	SW	Con	Lab	Lloyd Hatton	15,659	31.9%	1,048	15,659	14,611	8,168	8,017	2,153	429	49,037	64.6%
South East Cornwall	CUL	SW	Con	Lab	Anna Gelderd	15,670	31.8%	1,911	15,670	13,759	9,311	8,284	1,999	263	49,286	67.9%
South Holland and The Deepings	LIN	EM	Con	Con	John Hayes	17,462	38.0%	6,856	9,086	17,462	10,606	1,945	1,800	5,031	45,930	58.5%
South Leicestershire	LEI	EM	Con	Con	Alberto Costa	18,264	35.6%	5,508	12,758	18,264	10,235	7,621	2,481	—N/a	51,359	65.4%
South Norfolk	NFK	E	Con	Lab	Ben Goldsborough	17,353	35.0%	2,826	17,353	14,527	7,583	5,746	3,987	383	49,579	67.0%
South Northamptonshire	NTH	EM	Con	Con	Sarah Bool	19,191	35.7%	3,687	15,504	19,191	8,962	4,989	3,040	2,011	53,697	68.6%
South Ribble	LAN	NW	Con	Lab	Paul Foster	19,840	42.5%	6,501	19,840	13,339	8,995	2,972	1,574	—N/a	46,720	63.6%
South Shields	TWR	NE	Lab	Lab	Emma Lewell-Buck	15,122	41.1%	6,653	15,122	4,128	8,469	1,402	5,433	2,270	36,824	53.9%
South Shropshire	SAL	WM	Con	Con	Stuart Anderson	17,628	34.1%	1,624	6,939	17,628	9,171	16,004	1,911	—N/a	51,653	67.4%
South Suffolk	SFK	E	Con	Con	James Cartlidge	16,082	33.0%	3,047	13,035	16,082	9,252	6,424	4,008	—N/a	48,801	65.5%
South West Devon	DEV	SW	Con	Con	Rebecca Smith	17,916	34.3%	2,112	15,804	17,916	9,361	5,551	2,925	685	52,242	67.3%
South West Hertfordshire	HRT	E	Con	Con	Gagan Mohindra	16,458	34.1%	4,456	9,637	16,458	6,790	12,002	2,532	835	48,254	67.3%
South West Norfolk	NFK	E	Con	Lab	Terry Jermy	11,847	26.7%	630	11,847	11,217	9,958	2,618	1,838	6,857	44,335	59.3%
South West Wiltshire	WIL	SW	Con	Con	Andrew Murrison	15,617	33.8%	3,243	12,374	15,617	7,840	7,205	2,243	889	46,168	63.2%
Southampton Itchen	HAM	SE	Con	Lab	Darren Paffey	15,782	41.5%	6,105	15,782	9,677	6,853	2,684	2,793	264	38,053	55.6%
Southampton Test	HAM	SE	Lab	Lab	Satvir Kaur	15,945	44.5%	9,333	15,945	6,612	5,261	3,252	3,594	1,141	35,805	54.6%
Southend East and Rochford	ESS	E	Con	Lab	Bayo Alaba	15,395	38.8%	4,027	15,395	11,368	7,214	2,269	2,716	694	39,656	56.5%
Southend West and Leigh	ESS	E	Con	Lab	David Burton-Sampson	16,739	35.6%	1,949	16,739	14,790	8,273	3,174	3,262	632	46,968	62.4%
Southgate and Wood Green	LND	LND	Lab	Lab	Bambos Charalambous	23,337	51.1%	12,736	23,337	8,037	3,147	3,925	5,607	1,618	45,671	58.9%
Southport	MSY	NW	Con	Lab	Patrick Hurley	17,252	38.3%	5,789	17,252	11,463	7,395	5,868	2,159	922	45,059	61.2%
Spelthorne	SRY	SE	Con	Con	Lincoln Jopp	14,038	30.4%	1,590	12,448	14,038	8,284	8,710	2,413	273	46,166	62.6%
Spen Valley	WYK	YTH	Con	Lab	Kim Leadbeater	16,076	39.2%	6,188	16,076	9,859	9,888	1,425	2,284	1,526	41,058	56.5%
St Albans	HRT	E	LD	LD	Daisy Cooper	29,222	56.6%	19,834	5,189	9,388	4,336	29,222	3,272	207	51,614	71.0%
St Austell and Newquay	CUL	SW	Con	Lab	Noah Law	15,958	34.1%	2,470	15,958	13,488	9,212	4,805	2,337	932	46,732	61.4%
St Helens North	MSY	NW	Lab	Lab	David Baines	21,284	52.6%	12,169	21,284	4,507	9,115	1,799	3,495	274	40,474	53.6%
St Helens South and Whiston	MSY	NW	Lab	Lab	Marie Rimmer	18,919	49.7%	11,945	18,919	3,057	6,974	2,199	2,642	4,244	38,120	53.1%
St Ives	CUL	SW	Con	LD	Andrew George	25,033	52.0%	13,786	2,788	11,247	6,492	25,033	1,797	749	48,106	68.8%
St Neots and Mid Cambridgeshire	CAM	E	Con	LD	Ian Sollom	19,517	36.9%	4,648	6,918	14,896	5,673	19,517	2,663	3,215	52,855	67.7%
Stafford	STS	WM	Con	Lab	Leigh Ingham	18,531	40.3%	4,595	18,531	13,936	8,612	1,676	2,856	398	46,009	65.2%
Staffordshire Moorlands	STS	WM	Con	Con	Karen Bradley	15,310	35.4%	1,175	14,135	15,310	10,065	1,499	2,293	—N/a	43,302	62.0%
Stalybridge and Hyde	GTM	NW	Lab	Lab	Jonathan Reynolds	16,320	43.8%	8,539	16,320	6,872	7,781	1,080	2,745	2,441	37,239	51.5%
Stevenage	HRT	E	Con	Lab	Kevin Bonavia	17,698	41.4%	6,618	17,698	11,080	7,667	3,467	2,655	148	42,715	60.2%
Stockport	GTM	NW	Lab	Lab	Navendu Mishra	21,787	49.9%	15,270	21,787	4,967	6,517	3,724	4,865	1,823	43,868	57.0%
Stockton North	DUR	NE	Lab	Lab	Chris McDonald	17,128	45.8%	7,939	17,128	8,028	9,189	1,133	1,923	—N/a	37,401	53.2%
Stockton West	DUR	NE	Con	Con	Matt Vickers	20,372	41.9%	2,139	18,233	20,372	6,833	1,203	1,477	520	48,765	67.7%
Stoke-on-Trent Central	STS	WM	Con	Lab	Gareth Snell	14,950	42.4%	6,409	14,950	6,221	8,541	999	1,703	2,875	35,289	47.8%
Stoke-on-Trent North	STS	WM	Con	Lab	David Williams	14,579	40.3%	5,082	14,579	9,497	8,824	911	1,236	1,103	36,150	51.8%
Stoke-on-Trent South	STS	WM	Con	Lab	Allison Gardner	14,221	34.7%	627	14,221	13,594	8,851	1,577	1,207	1,492	40,942	58.5%
Stone, Great Wyrley and Penkridge	STS	WM	Con	Con	Gavin Williamson	19,880	46.5%	5,466	14,414	19,880	—N/a	2,952	2,236	3,288	42,770	59.8%
Stourbridge	WMD	WM	Con	Lab	Cat Eccles	15,338	38.5%	3,073	15,338	12,265	7,869	1,607	1,732	1,067	39,878	58.5%
Stratford and Bow	LND	LND	Lab	Lab	Uma Kumaran	19,145	44.1%	11,634	19,145	3,114	2,093	1,926	7,511	9,646	43,742	53.8%
Stratford-on-Avon	WAR	WM	Con	LD	Manuela Perteghella	23,450	44.3%	7,122	3,753	16,328	7,753	23,450	1,197	478	52,959	69.9%
Streatham and Croydon North	LND	LND	Lab	Lab	Steve Reed	23,232	52.1%	15,603	23,232	5,328	1,994	5,031	7,629	1,339	44,553	57.9%
Stretford and Urmston	GTM	NW	Lab	Lab	Andrew Western	22,642	49.2%	16,150	22,642	6,492	5,485	2,216	4,398	4,769	46,170	61.2%
Stroud	GLS	SW	Con	Lab	Simon Opher	25,607	46.4%	11,411	25,630	14,219	6,329	2,913	5,729	424	55,244	70.9%
Suffolk Coastal	SFK	E	Con	Lab	Jenny Riddell-Carpenter	15,672	31.7%	1,070	15,672	14,602	7,850	6,947	4,380	—N/a	49,451	66.4%
Sunderland Central	TWR	NE	Lab	Lab	Lewis Atkinson	16,852	42.2%	6,073	16,852	5,731	10,779	3,602	2,993	—N/a	39,957	52.5%
Surrey Heath	SRY	SE	Con	LD	Al Pinkerton	21,387	44.8%	5,640	3,148	15,747	6,252	21,387	1,162	92	47,928	66.4%
Sussex Weald	SXE	SE	Con	Con	Nus Ghani	16,758	34.1%	6,842	8,239	16,758	8,920	9,916	3,762	1,580	49,175	67.5%
Sutton and Cheam	LND	LND	Con	LD	Luke Taylor	17,576	36.9%	3,801	8,430	13,775	5,787	17,576	1,721	317	47,606	65.9%
Sutton Coldfield	WMD	WM	Con	Con	Andrew Mitchell	18,502	38.3%	2,543	15,959	18,502	8,213	2,587	2,419	653	48,333	65.2%
Swindon North	WIL	SW	Con	Lab	Will Stone	17,930	40.6%	4,103	17,930	13,827	7,557	2,086	2,366	399	44,165	60.3%
Swindon South	WIL	SW	Con	Lab	Heidi Alexander	21,676	48.4%	9,606	21,676	12,070	6,194	1,843	2,539	472	44,794	61.7%
Tamworth	STS	WM	Con	Lab	Sarah Edwards	15,338	35.0%	1,382	15,338	13,956	11,004	1,451	1,579	460	43,788	58.3%
Tatton	CHS	NW	Con	Con	Esther McVey	19,956	38.4%	1,136	18,820	19,956	5,948	4,614	2,571	—N/a	51,909	68.3%
Taunton and Wellington	SOM	SW	Con	LD	Gideon Amos	24,331	48.4%	11,939	3,552	12,392	8,053	24,331	1,832	134	50,294	63.9%
Telford	SAL	WM	Con	Lab	Shaun Davies	18,212	44.7%	8,102	18,212	8,728	10,110	1,560	2,120	—N/a	40,730	55.2%
Tewkesbury	GLS	SW	Con	LD	Cameron Thomas	20,730	42.7%	6,262	4,298	14,468	6,000	20,730	2,873	170	48,539	66.1%
The Wrekin	SAL	WM	Con	Con	Mark Pritchard	16,320	32.6%	883	15,437	16,320	9,920	4,757	3,028	558	50,020	63.4%
Thirsk and Malton	NYK	YTH	Con	Con	Kevin Hollinrake	19,544	39.2%	7,550	11,994	19,544	8,963	5,379	2,986	931	49,797	63.5%
Thornbury and Yate	AVN	SW	Con	LD	Claire Young	20,815	39.0%	3,014	5,057	17,801	7,529	20,815	2,165	–	53,367	68.3%
Thurrock	ESS	E	Con	Lab	Jen Craft	16,050	42.7%	6,474	16,050	8,009	9,576	1,157	1,632	1,134	37,558	51.2%
Tipton and Wednesbury	WMD	WM	Con	Lab	Antonia Bance	11,755	36.9%	3,385	11,755	8,370	8,019	592	1,509	1,605	31,850	43.0%
Tiverton and Minehead	SOM	SW	Con	LD	Rachel Gilmour	18,326	38.6%	3,507	4,325	14,819	7,787	18,326	2,234	—N/a	47,491	65.9%
Tonbridge	KEN	SE	Con	Con	Tom Tugendhat	20,517	40.8%	11,166	9,351	20,517	7,548	4,234	7,596	1,082	50,328	69.1%
Tooting	LND	LND	Lab	Lab	Rosena Allin-Khan	29,209	55.2%	19,487	29,209	9,722	2,546	4,438	5,672	1,356	52,943	69.5%
Torbay	DEV	SW	Con	LD	Steve Darling	18,937	41.1%	5,349	3,276	13,588	8,660	18,937	1,420	234	46,115	60.5%
Torridge and Tavistock	DEV	SW	Con	Con	Geoffrey Cox	16,049	31.6%	3,950	10,765	16,049	9,152	12,099	2,350	405	50,820	68.0%
Tottenham	LND	LND	Lab	Lab	David Lammy	23,066	57.5%	15,434	23,066	2,320	1,602	1,928	7,632	3,600	40,148	52.9%
Truro and Falmouth	CUL	SW	Con	Lab	Jayne Kirkham	20,783	41.4%	8,151	20,783	12,632	6,163	6,552	3,470	664	50,264	68.9%
Tunbridge Wells	KEN	SE	Con	LD	Mike Martin	23,661	43.6%	8,687	6,178	14,974	6,484	23,661	2,344	609	54,250	68.9%
Twickenham	LND	LND	LD	LD	Munira Wilson	30,185	56.3%	21,457	6,693	8,728	4,092	30,185	3,590	347	53,635	71.5%
Tynemouth	TWR	NE	Lab	Lab	Alan Campbell	24,491	50.6%	15,455	24,491	9,036	7,392	2,709	3,592	1,198	48,418	66.2%
Uxbridge and South Ruislip	LND	LND	Con	Lab	Danny Beales	16,599	36.2%	587	16,599	16,012	6,610	1,752	4,354	587	45,914	61.4%
Vauxhall and Camberwell Green	LND	LND	Lab	Lab	Florence Eshalomi	21,528	57.4%	15,112	21,528	2,809	2,033	4,549	6,416	201	37,536	53.8%
Wakefield and Rothwell	WYK	YTH	Con	Lab	Simon Lightwood	17,773	43.7%	9,346	17,773	7,322	8,427	3,249	2,389	1,496	40,656	54.2%
Wallasey	MSY	NW	Lab	Lab	Angela Eagle	24,674	57.7%	17,996	24,674	4,987	6,678	1,843	3,905	659	42,914	57.8%
Walsall and Bloxwich	WMD	WM	Con	Lab	Valerie Vaz	12,514	33.5%	4,914	12,514	6,679	7,293	817	2,288	7,600	37,332	49.6%
Walthamstow	LND	LND	Lab	Lab	Stella Creasy	27,172	59.3%	17,996	27,172	2,353	1,836	1,736	9,176	3,586	45,668	61.3%
Warrington North	CHS	NW	Lab	Lab	Charlotte Nichols	18,730	46.8%	9,190	18,730	6,486	9,540	2,737	1,889	659	40,041	56.7%
Warrington South	CHS	NW	Lab	Lab	Sarah Hall	23,201	46.7%	11,340	23,201	11,861	7,913	3,829	2,313	555	49,672	63.4%
Warwick and Leamington	WAR	WM	Lab	Lab	Matt Western	23,975	48.7%	12,412	23,975	11,563	5,154	3,881	4,471	154	49,198	64.5%
Washington and Gateshead South	TWR	NE	Lab	Lab	Sharon Hodgson	17,682	47.8%	6,913	17,682	4,654	10,769	1,602	1,687	627	37,021	52.2%
Watford	HRT	E	Con	Lab	Matt Turmaine	15,708	35.3%	4,723	15,708	10,985	4,930	7,577	2,428	2,827	44,455	60.8%
Waveney Valley	SFK	E	Con	Grn	Adrian Ramsay	20,467	41.7%	5,593	4,621	14,874	7,779	1,214	20,467	118	49,073	67.5%
Weald of Kent	KEN	SE	Con	Con	Katie Lam	20,202	39.8%	8,422	11,780	20,202	10,208	3,975	4,547	—N/a	50,712	66.7%
Wellingborough and Rushden	NTH	EM	Con	Lab	Gen Kitchen	17,734	40.3%	5,486	17,734	12,248	9,456	1,570	2,704	273	43,985	56.7%
Wells and Mendip Hills	SOM	SW	Con	LD	Tessa Munt	23,622	46.9%	11,121	3,527	12,501	6,611	23,622	2,068	2,039	50,368	68.5%
Welwyn Hatfield	HRT	E	Con	Lab	Andrew Lewin	19,877	41.0%	3,799	19,877	16,078	6,397	3,117	2,986	—N/a	48,455	64.4%
West Bromwich	WMD	WM	Con	Lab	Sarah Coombes	16,872	46.2%	9,554	16,872	7,318	7,101	1,314	2,036	1,840	36,481	49.3%
West Dorset	DOR	SW	Con	LD	Edward Morello	26,999	50.7%	7,789	3,086	19,210	—N/a	26,999	2,288	1,022	53,223	69.2%
West Ham and Beckton	LND	LND	Lab	Lab	James Asser	16,434	45.2%	9,254	16,434	3,781	2,800	1,606	3,897	7,830	36,497	46.0%
West Lancashire	LAN	NW	Lab	Lab	Ashley Dalton	22,305	50.5%	13,625	22,305	8,680	7,909	2,043	3,263	—N/a	44,200	59.7%
West Suffolk	SFK	E	Con	Con	Nick Timothy	15,814	34.3%	3,247	12,567	15,814	9,623	4,284	2,910	963	46,331	59.8%
West Worcestershire	WOR	WM	Con	Con	Harriett Baldwin	19,783	36.2%	6,547	8,335	19,783	7,902	13,236	5,068	363	54,687	69.0%
Westmorland and Lonsdale	CMA	NW	Con	LD	Tim Farron	31,061	62.7%	21,472	2,306	9,589	4,842	31,061	1,486	249	49,533	68.8%
Weston-super-Mare	SOM	SW	Con	Lab	Dan Aldridge	16,310	38.5%	4,409	16,310	11,901	7,735	3,756	2,688	—N/a	42,533	59.4%
Wetherby and Easingwold	WYK	YTH	Con	Con	Alec Shelbrooke	20,597	39.4%	4,846	15,751	20,597	7,288	3,351	4,529	743	52,438	70.3%
Whitehaven and Workington	CMA	NW	Con	Lab	Josh MacAlister	22,173	52.9%	13,286	22,173	8,455	8,887	1,189	1,207	—N/a	41,911	57.2%
Widnes and Halewood	MSY	NW	Lab	Lab	Derek Twigg	23,484	61.6%	16,425	23,484	3,507	7,059	1,593	2,058	415	38,116	54.3%
Wigan	GTM	NW	Lab	Lab	Lisa Nandy	19,401	47.4%	9,549	19,401	4,310	9,852	1,692	1,629	4,015	40,899	52.7%
Wimbledon	LND	LND	Con	LD	Paul Kohler	24,790	45.1%	12,610	11,733	12,180	3,221	24,790	2,442	619	54,985	72.0%
Winchester	HAM	SE	Con	LD	Danny Chambers	29,939	52.5%	13,821	3,023	16,118	4,797	29,939	2,740	459	57,261	73.0%
Windsor	BRK	SE	Con	Con	Jack Rankin	16,483	36.4%	6,457	10,026	16,483	4,660	9,539	2,288	2,250	45,419	61.9%
Wirral West	MSY	NW	Lab	Lab	Matthew Patrick	23,156	46.4%	9,998	23,156	13,158	6,422	3,055	4,160	—N/a	50,138	68.9%
Witham	ESS	E	Con	Con	Priti Patel	18,827	37.2%	5,145	13,682	18,827	9,870	3,439	3,539	1,246	50,603	64.1%
Witney	OXF	SE	Con	LD	Charlie Maynard	20,832	41.2%	4,339	4,773	16,493	6,307	20,832	1,661	518	50,584	67.0%
Woking	SRY	SE	Con	LD	Will Forster	24,019	49.9%	11,245	4,444	12,773	4,888	24,019	1,853	168	48,145	66.0%
Wokingham	BRK	SE	Con	LD	Clive Jones	25,743	47.7%	8,345	3,631	17,398	5,274	25,743	1,953	—N/a	53,999	71.9%
Wolverhampton North East	WMD	WM	Con	Lab	Sureena Brackenridge	14,282	42.9%	5,422	14,282	8,860	7,721	1,002	1,424	—N/a	33,289	47.1%
Wolverhampton South East	WMD	WM	Lab	Lab	Pat McFadden	16,800	50.3%	9,188	16,800	5,654	7,612	758	1,643	915	33,382	43.1%
Wolverhampton West	WMD	WM	Con	Lab	Warinder Juss	19,331	44.3%	7,868	19,331	11,463	6,078	1,376	2,550	2,859	43,657	56.1%
Worcester	WOR	WM	Con	Lab	Tom Collins	18,622	40.5%	7,116	18,622	11,506	6,723	3,986	4,789	410	46,036	61.4%
Worsley and Eccles	GTM	NW	Lab	Lab	Michael Wheeler	20,277	47.7%	11,091	20,277	6,791	9,186	1,851	3,283	1,155	42,707	54.1%
Worthing West	WSX	SE	Con	Lab	Beccy Cooper	20,519	40.2%	3,949	20,519	16,570	7,562	2,708	3,274	364	50,997	66.3%
Wycombe	BKM	SE	Con	Lab	Emma Reynolds	16,035	35.9%	4,591	16,035	11,444	4,769	4,236	2,193	5,960	44,637	60.8%
Wyre Forest	WOR	WM	Con	Con	Mark Garnier	14,489	32.1%	812	13,677	14,489	9,682	2,809	2,443	2,058	45,158	58.4%
Wythenshawe and Sale East	GTM	NW	Lab	Lab	Mike Kane	20,596	52.6%	14,610	20,596	5,392	5,986	1,985	4,133	1,040	39,132	50.9%
Yeovil	SOM	SW	Con	LD	Adam Dance	23,765	48.5%	12,286	3,002	11,497	7,677	23,765	2,403	608	48,942	61.3%
York Central	NYK	YTH	Lab	Lab	Rachael Maskell	24,537	56.6%	19,154	24,537	5,383	4,721	3,051	5,185	446	43,551	54.5%
York Outer	NYK	YTH	Con	Lab	Luke Charters	23,161	45.3%	9,391	23,161	13,770	5,912	5,496	2,212	555	51,106	67.0%
All constituencies									8,365,122	6,279,411	3,726,244	3,199,060	1,780,226	938,079	24,288,122	60.0%
All constituencies									34.4%	25.9%	15.3%	13.2%	7.3%	3.9%	100.0%	
All constituencies									Seats							
All constituencies									348	116	5	65	4	5	543	
All constituencies									64.1%	21.4%	0.921%	12.0%	0.737%	0.921%	100.0%	

=== Scotland ===
Constituency	2019 seat	2024 seat					Votes								Turnout
Constituency	2019 seat	Party	Candidate	Votes	Share	Majority	Lab.	SNP	Con.	Lib. Dems	Ref.	Green	Other	Total	Turnout
Aberdeen North	SNP	SNP	Kirsty Blackman	14,552	34.5%	1,779	12,773	14,552	5,881	2,583	3,781	1,275	1,269	42,114	55.4%
Aberdeen South	SNP	SNP	Stephen Flynn	15,213	32.8%	3,758	11,455	15,213	11,300	2,921	3,199	1,609	648	46,345	59.9%
Aberdeenshire North and Moray East	Con	SNP	Seamus Logan	13,455	35.2%	942	3,876	13,455	12,513	2,782	5,562	—N/a	—N/a	38,188	54.5%
Airdrie and Shotts	SNP	Lab	Kenneth Stevenson	18,871	51.5%	7,547	18,871	11,324	1,696	725	2,971	—N/a	1,079	36,666	52.2%
Alloa and Grangemouth	SNP	Lab	Brian Leishman	18,039	43.8%	6,122	18,039	11,917	3,127	1,151	3,804	1,421	1,742	41,201	58.3%
Angus and Perthshire Glens	SNP	SNP	Dave Doogan	19,142	40.4%	4,870	6,799	19,142	14,272	3,156	3,246	—N/a	733	47,348	61.8%
Arbroath and Broughty Ferry	SNP	SNP	Stephen Gethins	15,581	35.3%	859	14,722	15,581	6,841	2,249	3,800	—N/a	924	44,117	57.9%
Argyll, Bute and South Lochaber	SNP	SNP	Brendan O'Hara	15,582	34.7%	6,232	8,585	15,582	9,350	7,359	3,045	—N/a	941	45,078	62.5%
Ayr, Carrick and Cumnock	SNP	Lab	Elaine Stewart	14,930	36.5%	4,154	14,930	10,776	9,247	1,081	3,544	886	472	40,936	58.2%
Bathgate and Linlithgow	SNP	Lab	Kirsteen Sullivan	19,774	47.0%	8,323	19,774	11,451	3,144	2,171	3,524	1,390	611	42,065	58.3%
Berwickshire, Roxburgh and Selkirk	Con	Con	John Lamont	18,872	40.5%	6,599	6,311	12,273	18,872	3,686	3,340	1,526	550	46,558	60.9%
Caithness, Sutherland and Easter Ross	LD	LD	Jamie Stone	22,736	49.4%	10,489	3,409	12,247	1,860	22,736	3,360	1,641	795	46,170	61.8%
Central Ayrshire	SNP	Lab	Alan Gemmell	18,091	43.7%	6,869	18,091	11,222	6,147	983	3,420	1,039	517	41,419	59.7%
Coatbridge and Bellshill	SNP	Lab	Frank McNally	19,291	49.8%	6,344	19,291	12,947	1,382	671	2,601	1,229	610	38,731	53.3%
Cowdenbeath and Kirkcaldy	SNP	Lab	Melanie Ward	18,662	45.7%	7,248	18,662	11,414	3,203	1,593	3,128	1,556	1,258	40,814	56.8%
Cumbernauld and Kirkintilloch	SNP	Lab	Katrina Murray	18,513	45.2%	4,144	18,513	14,369	1,939	1,294	3,167	1,694	—N/a	40,976	58.2%
Dumfries and Galloway	Con	Con	John Cooper	13,527	29.6%	930	11,767	12,597	13,527	2,092	4,313	1,249	230	45,775	58.3%
Dumfriesshire, Clydesdale and Tweeddale	Con	Con	David Mundell	14,999	33.9%	4,242	10,140	10,757	14,999	2,800	3,822	1,448	208	44,174	61.5%
Dundee Central	SNP	SNP	Chris Law	15,544	40.0%	675	14,869	15,544	1,569	2,402	2,363	—N/a	2,101	38,848	52.3%
Dunfermline and Dollar	SNP	Lab	Graeme Downie	20,336	45.7%	8,241	20,336	12,095	3,297	3,181	2,887	2,078	663	44,537	61.2%
East Kilbride and Strathaven	SNP	Lab	Joani Reid	22,682	48.6%	9,057	22,682	13,625	3,547	1,074	3,377	1,811	591	46,707	61.1%
East Renfrewshire	SNP	Lab	Blair McDougall	21,935	43.7%	8,421	21,935	13,514	8,494	1,150	2,360	1,510	1,364	50,227	67.3%
Edinburgh East and Musselburgh	SNP	Lab	Chris Murray	18,790	41.2%	3,715	18,790	15,075	2,598	1,949	2,129	4,669	365	45,575	59.8%
Edinburgh North and Leith	SNP	Lab	Tracy Gilbert	20,805	42.1%	7,268	20,805	13,537	3,254	3,879	1,818	5,417	765	49,418	63.1%
Edinburgh South	Lab	Lab	Ian Murray	24,976	53.3%	17,251	24,976	7,725	4,001	2,746	1,845	4,270	1,263	46,826	66.1%
Edinburgh South West	SNP	Lab	Scott Arthur	18,663	40.9%	6,217	18,663	12,446	5,558	3,014	2,087	3,450	446	45,664	61.9%
Edinburgh West	LD	LD	Christine Jardine	26,645	50.8%	16,470	7,854	10,175	2,897	26,645	2,209	2,100	591	52,471	68.6%
Falkirk	SNP	Lab	Euan Stainbank	18,343	43.0%	4,996	18,343	13,347	3,576	1,092	3,375	1,711	1,181	42,625	57.9%
Glasgow East	SNP	Lab	John Grady	15,543	43.8%	3,784	15,543	11,759	1,707	872	2,371	2,727	466	35,445	51.4%
Glasgow North	SNP	Lab	Martin Rhodes	14,655	42.2%	3,539	14,655	11,116	1,366	1,142	1,655	4,233	572	34,739	51.4%
Glasgow North East	SNP	Lab	Maureen Burke	15,639	45.9%	4,637	15,639	11,002	1,182	592	2,272	2,471	933	34,091	47.0%
Glasgow South	SNP	Lab	Gordon McKee	17,696	41.8%	4,154	17,696	13,542	1,617	1,316	1,736	5,554	917	42,378	60.4%
Glasgow South West	SNP	Lab	Zubir Ahmed	15,552	43.6%	3,285	15,552	12,267	1,387	958	2,236	2,727	542	35,669	51.8%
Glasgow West	SNP	Lab	Patricia Ferguson	18,621	46.7%	6,446	18,621	12,175	1,720	1,316	2,098	3,662	310	39,902	57.8%
Glenrothes and Mid Fife	SNP	Lab	Richard Baker	15,994	44.3%	2,954	15,994	13,040	1,973	1,604	3,528	—N/a	—N/a	36,139	51.1%
Gordon and Buchan	Con	Con	Harriet Cross	14,418	32.9%	878	4,686	13,540	14,418	7,307	3,978	—N/a	—N/a	44,014	63.0%
Hamilton and Clyde Valley	SNP	Lab	Imogen Walker	21,020	49.9%	9,472	21,020	11,548	4,589	1,511	3,299	—N/a	117	42,084	55.8%
Inverclyde and Renfrewshire West	SNP	Lab	Martin McCluskey	18,931	46.9%	6,371	18,931	12,560	2,863	1,259	2,476	1,173	1,088	40,350	57.5%
Inverness, Skye and West Ross-shire	SNP	LD	Angus MacDonald	18,159	37.8%	2,160	6,246	15,999	2,502	18,159	2,034	2,038	178	48,056	61.7%
Kilmarnock and Loudoun	SNP	Lab	Lillian Jones	19,055	44.9%	5,129	19,055	13,936	3,527	850	3,472	1,237	401	42,478	56.9%
Livingston	SNP	Lab	Gregor Poynton	18,324	40.9%	3,528	18,324	14,796	3,469	2,025	3,977	1,704	545	44,840	57.5%
Lothian East	SNP	Lab	Douglas Alexander	23,555	49.2%	13,265	23,555	10,290	5,335	2,649	3,039	2,477	557	47,902	63.7%
Mid Dunbartonshire	SNP	LD	Susan Murray	22,349	42.4%	9,673	10,933	12,676	2,452	22,349	2,099	1,720	449	52,738	71.7%
Midlothian	SNP	Lab	Kirsty McNeill	21,480	48.6%	8,167	21,480	13,313	3,248	2,589	3,276	—N/a	259	44,165	60.0%
Moray West, Nairn and Strathspey	SNP	SNP	Graham Leadbitter	14,961	32.1%	1,001	8,259	14,961	13,960	3,785	3,490	1,676	423	46,554	60.4%
Motherwell, Wishaw and Carluke	SNP	Lab	Pamela Nash	19,168	49.1%	7,085	19,168	12,083	2,415	822	3,004	1,200	334	39,151	54.4%
Na h-Eileanan an Iar	SNP	Lab	Torcuil Crichton	6,692	49.5%	3,836	6,692	2,856	647	382	697	—N/a	2,254	13,528	63.7%
North Ayrshire and Arran	SNP	Lab	Irene Campbell	16,821	39.8%	3,551	16,821	13,270	5,954	1,005	3,415	1,327	470	42,262	58.6%
North East Fife	LD	LD	Wendy Chamberlain	23,384	54.7%	13,479	4,026	9,905	1,666	23,384	2,094	1,653	—N/a	42,728	61.2%
Orkney and Shetland	LD	LD	Alistair Carmichael	11,392	55.1%	7,807	1,493	3,585	586	11,392	1,586	2,046	—N/a	20,688	60.4%
Paisley and Renfrewshire North	SNP	Lab	Alison Taylor	19,561	47.1%	6,333	19,561	13,228	2,659	1,374	3,228	1,469	—N/a	41,519	58.6%
Paisley and Renfrewshire South	SNP	Lab	Johanna Baxter	19,583	47.4%	6,527	19,583	13,056	2,219	1,315	2,956	1,724	430	41,283	57.7%
Perth and Kinross-shire	SNP	SNP	Pete Wishart	18,928	37.8%	4,127	9,018	18,928	14,801	3,681	2,970	—N/a	679	50,077	64.8%
Rutherglen	SNP	Lab	Michael Shanks	21,460	50.5%	8,767	21,460	12,693	2,420	1,714	2,685	—N/a	1,512	42,484	58.5%
Stirling and Strathallan	SNP	Lab	Chris Kane	16,856	33.9%	1,394	16,856	15,462	9,469	2,530	3,145	2,320	—N/a	49,782	65.6%
West Aberdeenshire and Kincardine	Con	Con	Andrew Bowie	17,428	35.6%	3,441	6,397	13,987	17,428	6,342	3,497	1,032	275	48,958	67.1%
West Dunbartonshire	SNP	Lab	Douglas McAllister	19,312	48.8%	6,010	19,312	13,302	1,474	839	2,770	1,496	391	39,584	57.3%
All constituencies							851,897	724,758	307,344	234,228	167,979	92,685	35,919	2,414,810	59.0%
All constituencies							35.3%	30.0%	12.7%	9.7%	7.0%	3.8%	1.5%	100.0%	
All constituencies							Seats								
All constituencies							37	9	5	6	0	0	0	57	
All constituencies							65%	16%	8.8%	11%	0%	0%	0%	100.0%	

=== Wales ===
Constituency	2019 seat	2024 seat					Votes								Turnout
Constituency	2019 seat	Affiliate	Candidate	Votes	Share	Majority	Lab.	Con.	Ref.	PC	Lib. Dems	Green	Other	Total	Turnout
Aberafan Maesteg	Lab	Lab	Stephen Kinnock	17,838	49.9%	10,354	17,838	2,903	7,484	4,719	916	1,094	801	35,755	49.3%
Alyn and Deeside	Lab	Lab	Mark Tami	18,395	42.4%	8,794	18,395	7,892	9,601	1,938	2,065	1,926	1,575	43,392	57.3%
Bangor Aberconwy	Con	Lab	Claire Hughes	14,008	33.6%	4,896	14,008	9,036	6,091	9,112	1,524	1,361	528	41,660	59.1%
Blaenau Gwent and Rhymney	Lab	Lab	Nick Smith	16,027	53.6%	12,183	16,027	3,776	—N/a	3,844	1,268	1,719	3,288	29,922	42.7%
Brecon, Radnor and Cwm Tawe	Con	LD	David Chadwick	13,736	29.5%	1,472	9,904	12,264	6,567	2,280	13,736	1,188	609	46,548	63.7%
Bridgend	Con	Lab	Chris Elmore	16,516	39.9%	8,595	16,516	6,764	7,921	3,629	1,446	1,760	3,338	41,482	56.6%
Caerfyrddin	Con	PC	Ann Davies	15,520	34.0%	4,505	10,985	8,825	6,944	15,520	1,461	1,371	498	45,604	61.6%
Caerphilly	Lab	Lab	Chris Evans	14,538	38.0%	6,419	14,538	4,385	7,754	8,119	1,788	1,650	—N/a	38,234	52.6%
Cardiff East	Lab	Lab	Jo Stevens	15,833	40.5%	9,097	15,833	3,913	4,980	3,550	6,736	3,916	195	39,123	53.7%
Cardiff North	Lab	Lab	Anna McMorrin	20,849	43.9%	11,207	20,849	9,642	5,985	4,669	3,168	3,160	—N/a	47,473	66.4%
Cardiff South and Penarth	Lab	Lab	Stephen Doughty	17,428	44.5%	11,767	17,428	5,459	4,493	3,227	2,908	5,661	—N/a	39,176	53.6%
Cardiff West	Lab	Lab	Alex Barros-Curtis	16,442	36.7%	7,019	16,442	6,835	5,626	9,423	1,921	3,157	1,353	44,757	59.1%
Ceredigion Preseli	PC	PC	Ben Lake	21,738	46.9%	14,789	5,386	4,763	5,374	21,738	6,949	1,864	228	46,302	61.2%
Clwyd East	Con	Lab	Becky Gittins	18,484	38.7%	4,622	18,484	13,862	7,626	3,733	1,859	1,659	599	47,822	62.4%
Clwyd North	Con	Lab	Gill German	14,794	35.5%	1,196	14,794	13,598	7,000	3,159	1,685	1,391	—N/a	41,627	55.5%
Dwyfor Meirionnydd	PC	PC	Liz Saville Roberts	21,788	53.9%	15,876	5,912	4,712	4,857	21,788	1,381	1,448	297	40,395	55.3%
Gower	Lab	Lab	Tonia Antoniazzi	20,480	43.4%	11,567	20,480	8,913	8,530	3,942	2,593	2,488	283	47,229	62.0%
Llanelli	Lab	Lab	Nia Griffith	12,751	31.3%	1,504	12,751	4,275	11,247	9,511	1,254	1,106	600	40,744	57.0%
Merthyr Tydfil and Aberdare	Lab	Lab	Gerald Jones	15,791	44.8%	7,447	15,791	2,687	8,344	4,768	1,276	1,231	1,118	35,215	47.3%
Mid and South Pembrokeshire	Con	Lab	Henry Tufnell	16,505	35.4%	1,878	16,505	14,627	7,828	2,962	2,372	1,654	681	46,629	59.0%
Monmouthshire	Con	Lab	Catherine Fookes	21,010	41.3%	3,338	21,010	17,672	5,438	1,273	2,279	2,357	815	50,844	68.0%
Montgomeryshire and Glyndŵr	Con	Lab	Steve Witherden	12,709	29.4%	3,815	12,709	7,775	8,894	5,667	6,470	1,744	—N/a	43,259	58.4%
Neath and Swansea East	Lab	Lab	Carolyn Harris	16,797	41.8%	6,627	16,797	3,765	10,170	5,350	2,344	1,711	—N/a	40,137	52.6%
Newport East	Lab	Lab	Jessica Morden	16,370	42.5%	9,009	16,370	6,487	7,361	2,239	2,045	2,092	1,937	38,531	50.2%
Newport West and Islwyn	Lab	Lab	Ruth Jones	17,409	41.5%	8,868	17,409	6,710	8,541	3,529	2,087	2,078	1,597	41,951	55.4%
Pontypridd	Lab	Lab	Alex Davies-Jones	16,225	41.2%	8,402	16,225	3,775	7,823	5,275	1,606	1,865	2,809	39,378	51.8%
Rhondda and Ogmore	Lab	Lab	Chris Bryant	17,118	47.8%	7,790	17,118	2,050	9,328	5,198	935	1,177	—N/a	35,806	48.1%
Swansea West	Lab	Lab	Torsten Bell	14,761	41.4%	8,515	14,761	3,536	6,246	4,105	4,367	2,305	337	35,657	48.0%
Torfaen	Lab	Lab	Nick Thomas-Symonds	15,176	42.5%	7,322	15,176	5,737	7,854	2,571	1,644	1,705	1,018	35,705	49.8%
Vale of Glamorgan	Con	Lab	Kanishka Narayan	17,740	38.7%	4,216	17,740	13,524	6,973	3,245	1,612	1,881	851	45,826	61.5%
Wrexham	Con	Lab	Andrew Ranger	15,836	39.2%	5,948	15,836	9,888	6,915	4,138	1,777	1,339	480	40,373	57.4%
Ynys Môn	Con	PC	Llinos Medi	10,590	32.5%	637	7,619	9,953	3,223	10,590	439	604	200	32,628	61.4%
All constituencies							487,636	240,003	223,018	194,811	85,911	61,662	35,919	1,319,076	56.0%
All constituencies							37.0%	18.2%	16.9%	14.8%	6.5%	4.7%	2.7%	100.0%	
All constituencies							Seats								
All constituencies							27	0	0	4	1	0	0	32	
All constituencies							84%	0%	0%	13%	3.2%	0%	0%	100.0%	

=== Northern Ireland ===
Constituency	2019 seat	2024 seat					Votes									Turnout
Constituency	2019 seat	Affiliate	Candidate	Votes	Share	Majority	SF	DUP	APNI	UUP	SDLP	TUV	Ind.	Other	Total	Turnout
Belfast East	DUP	DUP	Gavin Robinson	19,894	46.6%	2,676	—N/a	19,894	17,218	1,818	619	1,918	162	1,077	42,706	58.6%
Belfast North	SF	SF	John Finucane	17,674	43.7%	5,612	17,674	12,062	4,274	—N/a	1,413	2,877	—N/a	2,152	40,452	54.5%
Belfast South and Mid Down	SDLP	SDLP	Claire Hanna	21,345	49.1%	12,506	—N/a	6,859	8,839	2,653	21,345	2,218	—N/a	1,577	43,491	58.0%
Belfast West	SF	SF	Paul Maskey	21,009	52.9%	15,961	21,009	4,304	1,077	461	4,318	2,010	161	6,403	39,743	53.0%
East Antrim	DUP	DUP	Sammy Wilson	11,462	28.9%	1,306	2,986	11,462	10,156	9,476	892	4,135	—N/a	568	39,675	54.1%
East Londonderry	DUP	DUP	Gregory Campbell	11,506	27.9%	179	11,327	11,506	3,734	3,412	5,260	4,363	—N/a	1,675	41,277	55.0%
Fermanagh and South Tyrone	SF	SF	Pat Cullen	24,844	48.6%	4,571	24,844	—N/a	2,420	20,273	2,386	—N/a	—N/a	1,153	51,076	65.6%
Foyle	SDLP	SDLP	Colum Eastwood	15,647	40.8%	4,166	11,481	3,915	1,268	1,422	15,647	—N/a	1,519	3,106	38,358	52.0%
Lagan Valley	DUP	APNI	Sorcha Eastwood	18,618	37.9%	2,959	—N/a	15,659	18,618	11,157	1,028	2,186	—N/a	433	49,081	59.7%
Mid Ulster	SF	SF	Cathal Mallaghan	24,085	53.0%	14,923	24,085	9,162	2,001	2,269	3,722	2,978	181	1,047	45,445	61.4%
Newry and Armagh	SF	SF	Dáire Hughes	22,299	48.5%	15,493	22,299	5,900	2,692	3,175	6,806	4,099	—N/a	971	45,942	59.1%
North Antrim	DUP	TUV	Jim Allister	11,642	28.3%	450	7,714	11,192	4,488	3,901	1,661	11,642	136	451	41,185	55.0%
North Down	APNI	Ind.	Alex Easton	20,913	48.3%	7,305	—N/a	—N/a	13,608	6,754	657	—N/a	20,913	1,364	43,296	59.0%
South Antrim	DUP	UUP	Robin Swann	16,311	38.0%	7,512	8,034	8,799	4,574	16,311	1,589	2,693	—N/a	908	42,908	56.0%
South Down	SF	SF	Chris Hazzard	19,698	43.5%	9,280	19,698	7,349	3,187	1,411	10,418	1,893	—N/a	1,287	45,243	59.0%
Strangford	DUP	DUP	Jim Shannon	15,559	40.0%	5,131	2,793	15,559	10,428	3,941	1,783	3,143	413	849	38,909	52.2%
Upper Bann	DUP	DUP	Carla Lockhart	21,642	45.7%	7,406	14,236	21,642	6,322	3,662	1,496	—N/a	—N/a	—N/a	47,358	58.0%
West Tyrone	SF	SF	Órfhlaith Begley	22,711	52.0%	15,917	22,711	6,794	2,287	2,683	5,821	2,530	—N/a	869	43,692	59.0%
All constituencies							210,891	172,058	117,191	94,779	86,861	48,685	23,485	25,890	779,840	57.1%
All constituencies							27.1%	22.1%	15.0%	12.2%	11.1%	6.3%	3.0%	3.3%	100.0%	
All constituencies							Seats									
All constituencies							7	5	1	1	2	1	1	0	18	
All constituencies							39%	28%	5.6%	5.6%	11%	5.6%	5.6%	0.0%	100.0%	
