= Foreign Affairs Select Committee =

UK House of Commons select committee

The Foreign Affairs Select Committee is one of many select committees of the British House of Commons, which scrutinises the expenditure, administration and policy of the Foreign, Commonwealth and Development Office.

== Chairs ==
Committee chairs include those listed below.

| Name | Start | End | Party | Constituency |
|---|---|---|---|---|
| Anthony Kershaw | 3 May 1979 | 1 January 1987 | Conservative | Stroud |
| David Howell | 1 January 1987 | 21 March 1997 | Conservative | Guildford |
| Donald Anderson | 16 July 1997 | 12 July 2005 | Labour | Swansea East |
| Mike Gapes | 18 July 2005 | 12 April 2010 | Labour Co-op | Ilford South |
| Richard Ottaway | 10 June 2010 | 30 March 2015 | Conservative | Nottingham North |
| Crispin Blunt | 18 June 2015 | 3 May 2017 | Conservative | Reigate |
| Tom Tugendhat | 12 July 2017 | 7 September 2022 | Conservative | Tonbridge and Malling |
| Alicia Kearns | 12 October 2022 | 30 May 2024 | Conservative | Rutland and Melton |
| Emily Thornberry | 11 September 2024 | present | Labour | Islington South and Finsbury |

== Membership ==
Membership of the committee is as follows:

| Member | Party | Constituency |
|---|---|---|
| Emily Thornberry MP (Chair) | Labour | Islington South and Finsbury |
| Zubir Ahmed MP | Labour | Glasgow South West |
| Fleur Anderson MP | Labour | Putney |
| Alex Ballinger MP | Labour | Halesowen |
| Aphra Brandreth MP | Conservative | Chester South and Eddisbury |
| Dan Carden MP | Labour | Liverpool Walton |
| Richard Foord MP | Liberal Democrats | Honiton and Sidmouth |
| Abtisam Mohamed MP | Labour | Sheffield Central |
| Edward Morello MP | Liberal Democrats | West Dorset |
| Jessica Toale MP | Labour | Bournemouth West |
| John Whittingdale MP | Conservative | Maldon |

=== Changes since 2024 ===
| Date | Outgoing Member & Party | Constituency | → | New Member & Party | Constituency | Source |
|---|---|---|---|---|---|---|
| 16 December 2024 | Claire Hazelgrove MP (Labour) | Filton and Bradley Stoke | → | Alex Ballinger MP (Labour) | Halesowen | Hansard |
| 16 December 2024 | Matthew Patrick MP (Labour) | Wirral West | → | Phil Brickell MP (Labour) | Bolton West | Hansard |
| 27 October 2025 | Blair McDougall MP (Labour) | East Renfrewshire | → | Fleur Anderson MP (Labour) | Putney | Hansard |
| 13 April 2026 | Phil Brickell MP (Labour) | Bolton West | → | Alan Gemmell MP (Labour) | Central Ayrshire | Hansard |
| 26 October 2026 | Alan Gemmell MP (Labour) | Central Ayrshire | → | Zubir Ahmed MP (Labour) | Glasgow South West | Hansard |
| 26 October 2026 | Uma Kumaran MP (Labour) | Stratford and Bow | → | Jessica Toale MP (Labour) | Bournemouth West | Hansard |

== 2019-2024 Parliament ==
The chair was elected on 29 January 2020, with the members of the committee being announced on 2 March 2020. In 2022 Tom Tugendhat stepped down as the chair of the Foreign Affairs Select Committee after assuming a ministerial role as Minister for Security. He was replaced by Alicia Kearns.

| Member | Party | Constituency |
|---|---|---|
| Tom Tugendhat (Chair) | Conservative | Tonbridge and Malling |
| Chris Bryant | Labour | Rhondda |
| Chris Elmore | Labour | Ogmore |
| Alicia Kearns | Conservative | Rutland and Melton |
| Stewart McDonald | Scottish National Party | Glasgow South |
| Ian Murray | Labour | Edinburgh South |
| Andrew Rosindell | Conservative | Romford |
| Bob Seely | Conservative | Isle of Wight |
| Henry Smith | Conservative | Crawley |
| Royston Smith | Conservative | Southampton Itchen |
| Graham Stringer | Labour | Blackley and Broughton |

=== Changes 2019-2024 ===
| Date | Outgoing Member & Party | Constituency | → | New Member & Party | Constituency | Source |
|---|---|---|---|---|---|---|
| 11 May 2020 | Chris Elmore MP (Labour) | Ogmore | → | Neil Coyle MP (Labour) | Bermondsey and Old Southwark | Hansard |
| 11 May 2020 | Ian Murray MP (Labour) | Edinburgh South | → | Claudia Webbe MP (Labour) | Leicester East | Hansard |
| 5 January 2022 | Claudia Webbe MP (Independent) | Leicester East | → | Liam Byrne MP (Labour) | Birmingham Hodge Hill | Hansard |
| 7 September 2022 | Tom Tugendhat MP (Chair, Conservative) | Tonbridge and Malling | → | Vacant | | Hansard |
| 12 October 2022 | Alicia Kearns MP (Conservative) | Rutland and Melton | → | Vacant | | Hansard |
| 12 October 2022 | Vacant | | → | Alicia Kearns MP (Chair, Conservative) | Rutland and Melton | Hansard |
| 29 November 2022 | Vacant | | → | Saqib Bhatti MP (Conservative) | Meriden | Hansard |
| 9 January 2023 | Stewart McDonald MP (SNP) | Glasgow South | → | Drew Hendry MP (SNP) | Inverness, Nairn, Badenoch and Strathspey | Hansard |
| 12 September 2023 | Drew Hendry MP (SNP) | Inverness, Nairn, Badenoch and Strathspey | → | Brendan O'Hara MP (SNP) | Argyll and Bute | Hansard |
| 11 November 2023 | Chris Bryant MP (Labour) | Rhondda | → | Dan Carden MP (Labour) | Liverpool Walton | Hansard |
| 11 November 2023 | Fabian Hamilton MP (Labour) | Birmingham Hodge Hill | → | Claudia Webbe MP (Labour) | Leeds North East | Hansard |
| 11 December 2023 | Saqib Bhatti MP (Conservative) | Meriden | → | Ranil Jayawardena MP (Conservative) | North East Hampshire | Hansard |

== 2017–2019 Parliament ==
The chair was elected on 12 July 2017, with the members of the committee being announced on 11 September 2017.

| Member | Party | Constituency |
|---|---|---|
| Tom Tugendhat (Chair) | Conservative | Tonbridge and Malling |
| Ian Austin | Labour | Dudley North |
| Chris Bryant | Labour | Rhondda |
| Ann Clwyd | Labour | Cynon Valley |
| Mike Gapes | Labour | Ilford South |
| Stephen Gethins | Scottish National Party | North East Fife |
| Nus Ghani | Conservative | Wealden |
| Ian Murray | Labour | Edinburgh South |
| Andrew Rosindell | Conservative | Romford |
| Royston Smith | Conservative | Southampton Itchen |
| Nadhim Zahawi | Conservative | Stratford-on-Avon |

=== Changes 2017–2019 ===
| Date | Outgoing Member & Party | Constituency | → | New Member & Party | Constituency | Source |
|---|---|---|---|---|---|---|
| 2 February 2018 | Nus Ghani MP (Conservative) | Wealden | → | Priti Patel MP (Conservative) | Witham | Hansard |
| 2 February 2018 | Nadhim Zahawi MP (Conservative) | Stratford-on-Avon | → | Bob Seely MP (Conservative) | Isle of Wight | Hansard |
| 19 March 2019 | Ian Austin MP (Independent) | Dudley North | → | Conor McGinn MP (Labour) (Note: Unusually, this motion was debated by the House. It was objected to by Austin and Gapes, since they perceived it to be retaliation by Jeremy Corbyn for their comments on antisemitism while they were still in the Labour Party. The change was approved by 199 votes to 134.) | St Helens North | Hansard |
| 19 March 2019 | Mike Gapes MP (Change UK) | Stratford-on-Avon | → | Catherine West MP (Labour) | Hornsey and Wood Green | Hansard |

== 2015–2017 Parliament ==
The chair was elected on 18 June 2015, with members being announced on 8 July 2015.

| Member | Party | Constituency |
|---|---|---|
| Crispin Blunt (Chair) | Conservative | Reigate |
| John Baron | Conservative | Basildon and Billericay |
| Ann Clwyd | Labour | Cynon Valley |
| Mike Gapes | Labour | Ilford South |
| Stephen Gethins | Scottish National Party | North East Fife |
| Mark Hendrick | Labour and Co-op | Preston |
| Adam Holloway | Conservative | Gravesham |
| Daniel Kawczynski | Conservative | Shrewsbury and Atcham |
| Yasmin Qureshi | Labour | Bolton South East |
| Andrew Rosindell | Conservative | Romford |
| Nadhim Zahawi | Conservative | Stratford-on-Avon |

=== Changes 2015–2017 ===
| Date | Outgoing Member & Party | Constituency | → | New Member & Party | Constituency | Source |
|---|---|---|---|---|---|---|
| 31 October 2016 | Yasmin Qureshi MP (Labour) | Bolton South East | → | Ian Murray MP (Labour) | Edinburgh South | Hansard |

== 2010–2015 Parliament ==
The chair was elected on 10 June 2010, with members being announced on 12 July 2010.

| Member | Party | Constituency |
|---|---|---|
| Richard Ottaway (Chair) | Conservative | Croydon South |
| John Baron | Conservative | Basildon and Billericay |
| Menzies Campbell | Liberal Democrats | North East Fife |
| Ann Clwyd | Labour | Cynon Valley |
| Mike Gapes | Labour | Ilford South |
| Emma Reynolds | Labour | Wolverhampton North East |
| Andrew Rosindell | Conservative | Romford |
| Frank Roy | Labour | Motherwell and Wishaw |
| John Stanley | Conservative | Tonbridge and Malling |
| Rory Stewart | Conservative | Penrith and The Border |
| David Watts | Labour | St Helens North |

=== Changes 2010–2015 ===
| Date | Outgoing Member & Party | Constituency | → | New Member & Party | Constituency | Source |
|---|---|---|---|---|---|---|
| 2 November 2010 | Emma Reynolds MP (Labour) | Wolverhampton North East | → | Bob Ainsworth MP (Labour) | Coventry North East | Hansard |
| 18 June 2012 | David Watts MP (Labour) | St Helens North | → | Mark Hendrick MP (Labour and Co-op) | Preston | Hansard |
| 20 May 2013 | Bob Ainsworth MP (Labour) | Coventry North East | → | Sandra Osborne MP (Labour) | Ayr, Carrick and Cumnock | Hansard |
| 30 June 2014 | Rory Stewart MP (Conservative) | Penrith and The Border | → | Nadhim Zahawi MP (Conservative) | Stratford-on-Avon | Hansard |

== Inquiries ==
The Foreign Affairs Committee carries out many inquiries, and publishes a variety of reports, including an annual Human Rights Report. During its inquiry into the government's decision to invade Iraq, David Kelly famously gave evidence to the committee on 15 July 2003, two days before his death.

In 2015 and 2016 the committee conducted an extensive and highly critical inquiry into the British involvement in the Libyan Civil War. It concluded that the early threat to civilians had been overstated and that the significant Islamist element in the rebel forces had not been recognised, due to an intelligence failure. By summer 2011 the initial limited intervention to protect Libyan civilians had become a policy of regime change. However that new policy did not include proper support and for a new government, leading to a political and economic collapse in Libya and the growth of ISIL in North Africa. The report concluded that the former Prime Minister David Cameron was ultimately responsible for this British policy failure.

== See also ==
- Parliamentary committees of the United Kingdom
