= Alex Ballinger =

British politician

Alex Ballinger MP
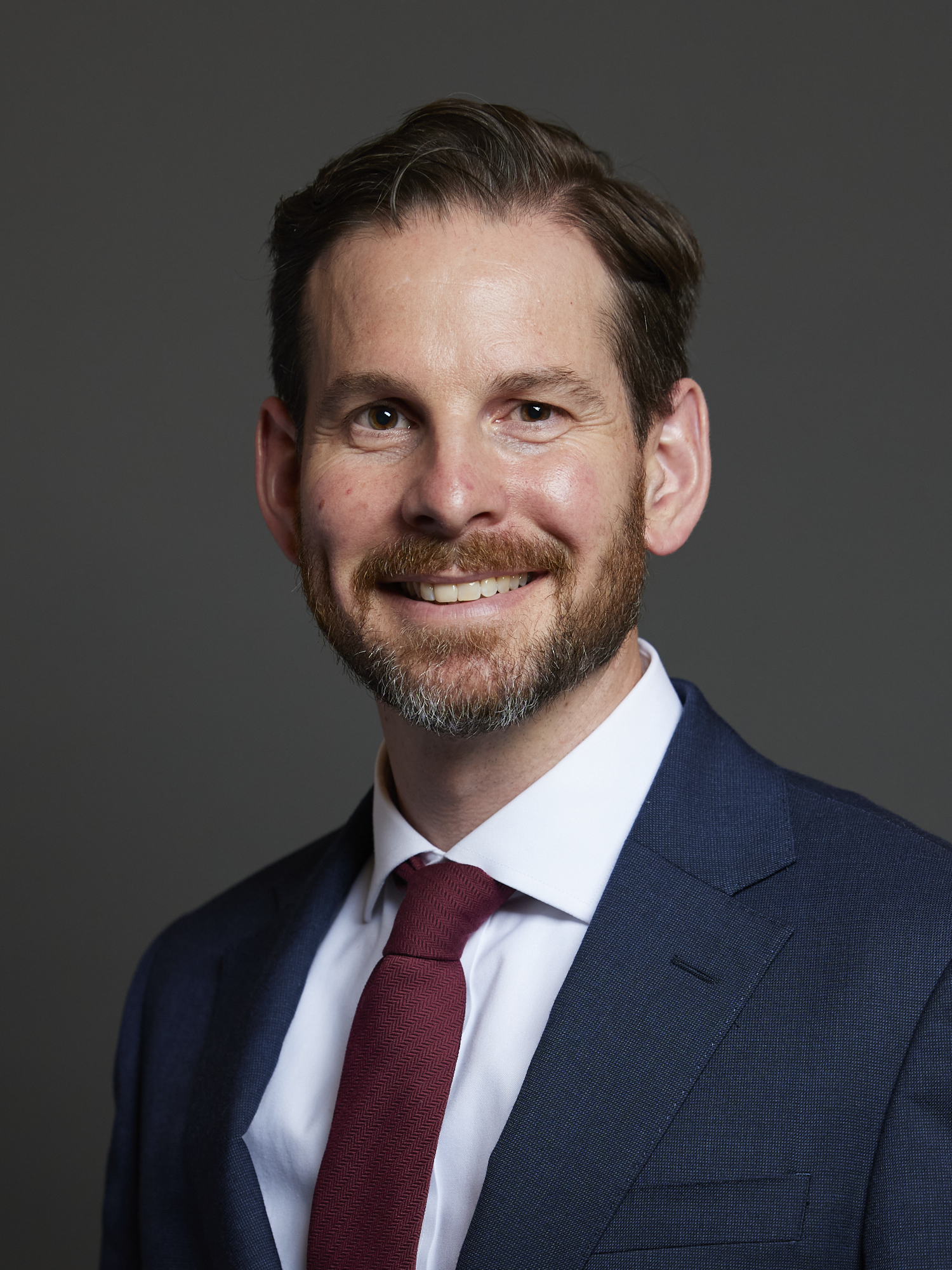
- Official portrait, 2024

Member of Parliament for Halesowen
- Incumbent
- Assumed office 4 July 2024
- Preceded by: Constituency established
- Majority: 4,364 (11.3%)

Personal details
- Born: Alexander Robert Ballinger
- Party: Labour

Military service
- Allegiance: United Kingdom
- Branch/service: Royal Marines
- Years of service: 2005–2013
- Rank: Captain
- Unit: Royal Marines

Alexander Robert Ballinger is a British Labour politician and former Royal Marine who has been the Member of Parliament for Halesowen since 2024. He gained the seat from James Morris, a Conservative.

== Career ==
Ballinger studied aerospace engineering at the University of Manchester before joining the Royal Marines in 2005, later reaching the rank of captain. He served on operations in Afghanistan, including deployments in 2006 and 2009, and has referred to a family tradition of military service and his deployment alongside his brother.

After leaving the armed forces, Ballinger joined the Department for International Development (DFID) and led humanitarian and refugee operations during the Syrian civil war, before moving to the Foreign, Commonwealth & Development Office (FCDO), working on Pakistan’s Federally Administered Tribal Areas and later heading the UK’s mission in Lahore. During the 2021 Afghanistan evacuation, he led a team assisting evacuations across the border into Pakistan.

From 2023 to 2024, Ballinger ran a small mental health charity based in Birmingham and the Black Country.

== Parliamentary career ==
Ballinger was elected on 4 July 2024 with 38.9% of the vote.

He was subsequently appointed a member of the Foreign Affairs Committee and has used both committee and chamber proceedings to press ministers on Gaza and humanitarian access to it. In September 2025, it was reported that Ballinger told a Labour conference fringe meeting he believed Israel’s actions in Gaza “meet the conditions” for genocide.

Ballinger has been active on defence and service life issues. He serves as chair of the All-Party Parliamentary Group for the Armed Forces and was appointed to the Select Committee on the Armed Forces Bill.

Ballinger is co-chair of the All-Party Parliamentary Group for Gambling Reform, and was a leading voice calling for increasing taxation on online gambling companies, in order to fund the lifting of the two-child benefit cap.

On 11 May 2026, he called on Keir Starmer to resign following the 2026 United Kingdom local elections.

=== Constituency-linked issues ===
Ballinger has raised constituency-linked issues in Parliament, including leading a Commons debate on knife crime in the West Midlands. He has also campaigned for greater road safety in his constituency.

In January 2026, he secured a Westminster Hall debate on the UK Town of Culture initiative; with multiple MPs referencing his “passionate pitch” for his area.
