= Halesowen (constituency) =

UK Parliament constituency (since 2024)

Coordinates: 52.46°N 2.06°W

- Borough constituency for the House of Commons
- Boundaries since 2024
- Boundary of Halesowen in West Midlands region
- County: West Midlands
- Electorate: 69,907 (2023)
- Major settlements: Halesowen, Cradley Heath

Current constituency
- Created: 2024
- Member of Parliament: Alex Ballinger (Labour)
- Seats: One
- Created from: Halesowen and Rowley Regis; Stourbridge (part)

Halesowen is a constituency of the House of Commons in the UK Parliament. Created as a result of the 2023 Periodic Review of Westminster constituencies, it was first contested at the 2024 general election. It is represented by Alex Ballinger of the Labour Party.

The constituency is named after the town of Halesowen.

== Constituency profile ==
Halesowen is an urban and suburban constituency located in the West Midlands county. It covers the connected towns of Halesowen and Cradley Heath. The constituency is part of the Black Country and has an industrial heritage; Halesowen and Cradley Heath have a history of coal mining and metalworking, particularly in the production of nails and chains. Wealth in the constituency is divided; Cradley Heath has high levels of deprivation whilst Halesowen is more affluent, particularly in its southern suburbs. The average house price in the constituency is lower than the rest of the West Midlands region and considerably lower than the national average.

Constituents' levels of education, income and professional employment are lower than national averages. White people made up 83% of the population at the 2021 census, a similar proportion to the country as a whole. Asians, mostly Pakistanis, were the largest ethnic minority group at 9% of the population. At the local council level, Halesowen is mostly represented by Conservatives with some Liberal Democrat support in the western suburbs, whilst Cradley Heath elected Labour Party councillors. Voters in the constituency strongly supported leaving the European Union in the 2016 referendum; an estimated 66% voted in favour of Brexit compared to the nationwide figure of 52%, making Halesowen one of the top-50 most Brexit-supporting constituencies out of 650 across the country.

== Boundaries ==
The constituency comprises the following as they existed on 1 December 2020:

- The Metropolitan Borough of Dudley wards of Belle Vale, Cradley and Wollescote, Halesowen North, Halesowen South, Hayley Green and Cradley South, and Quarry Bank and Dudley Wood.
- The Metropolitan Borough of Sandwell wards of Blackheath (polling district BLG), and Cradley Heath and Old Hill.

It covers the following areas of the West Midlands:

- The majority of the Halesowen and Rowley Regis constituency – excluding the Rowley ward (moved to West Bromwich) and the bulk of the Blackheath ward (moved to Smethwick)
- The Cradley and Wollescote, and Quarry Bank and Dudley Wood wards, transferred from the Stourbridge constituency

== Members of Parliament ==
Halesowen and Rowley Regis prior to 2024

Election	Member	Party
2024	Alex Ballinger	Labour

== Elections ==
=== Elections in the 2020s ===
General election 2024: Halesowen
Party	Candidate	Votes	%	±%
Labour	Alex Ballinger	15,023	38.9	+6.3
Conservative	James Morris	10,659	27.6	−32.6
Reform UK	Jonathan Oakton	8,484	22.0	N/A
Liberal Democrats	Ryan Priest	2,261	5.9	+2.4
Green	Emma Bullard	2,151	5.6	+3.2
Majority		4,364	11.3	
Turnout		38,578	56.3	
Labour win (new seat)				

- James Morris (Conservative) ― Incumbent MP for Halesowen and Rowley Regis

To assess the impact of the boundary changes, various organisations calculated results of the 2019 election if it was conducted under boundaries established by 2023 Periodic review. Below is such assessment from BBC for Halesowen:

Notional result of 2019 election under new (2023) boundaries

UK General Election, 2019 Notional Result: Halesowen
Party	Candidate	Votes	%	±%
Conservative		26,341	60.2	
Labour		14,259	32.6	
Liberal Democrats		1,525	3.5	
Green		1,066	2.4	
Other		533	1.2	
Majority		12,082	28.0	
Conservative hold		Swing		

For more information see Notional results of the 2019 United Kingdom general election by 2024 constituency.

== See also ==
- List of parliamentary constituencies in the West Midlands (county)
- List of parliamentary constituencies in West Midlands (region)
