= Hypothetical scenario opinion polling for the next United Kingdom general election =

Various organisations conduct opinion polling ahead of the next United Kingdom general election. Pollsters sometimes carry out polling based on hypothetical political scenarios in order to predict the impact on polling were they to happen, such as the formation of a new party or a change of party leader.

The next general election must be held no later than 15 August 2029 under the Dissolution and Calling of Parliament Act 2022, which mandates that any Parliament automatically dissolves five years after it first met – unless it is dissolved earlier at the request of the prime minister – and polling day occurs no more than 25 working days later. Most of the polling companies listed are members of the British Polling Council (BPC) and abide by its disclosure rules. The dates of the polls range from the 2024 United Kingdom general election, held on 4 July, to the present.

== Polling with different party leaders ==
=== Different Conservative Party leaders ===
For the 2024 Conservative Party leadership election, Electoral Calculus conducted a multilevel regression with poststratification (MRP) opinion poll on behalf of Jack Lewy of the Robert Jenrick campaign, asking the general public how they would vote if respectively Kemi Badenoch or Robert Jenrick were elected leader of the Conservatives.

Date(s) conducted	Pollster	Client	Area	Sample size	Hypothetical Conservative leader		Lab	Con	LD	SNP	Ref	Grn	PC	Others	Majority / lead
11–15 Oct 2024	Find Out Now/Electoral Calculus (MRP)	Jack Lewy / Robert Jenrick	GB	6,289	Kemi Badenoch	Seats	332	151	63	48	25	4	4	5	Lab 14
11–15 Oct 2024	Find Out Now/Electoral Calculus (MRP)	Jack Lewy / Robert Jenrick	GB	6,289	Kemi Badenoch	Vote share	29%	22%	12%	4%	21%	10%	1%	1%	7
11–15 Oct 2024	Find Out Now/Electoral Calculus (MRP)	Jack Lewy / Robert Jenrick	GB	6,289	Robert Jenrick	Seats	311	178	58	48	24	4	4	5	Hung (Lab −15)
11–15 Oct 2024	Find Out Now/Electoral Calculus (MRP)	Jack Lewy / Robert Jenrick	GB	6,289	Robert Jenrick	Vote share	28%	23%	12%	4%	20%	11%	1%	1%	5

=== With Andy Burnham as Labour leader ===
In May 2026, amid Greater Manchester Mayor Andy Burnham's run in the 2026 Makerfield by-election and speculation of him challenging incumbent Labour leader and Prime Minister Keir Starmer, More in Common and Deltapoll conducted national polls with the condition of Burnham as leader. BMG Research then conducted a further poll after Starmer's resignation.

Date(s) conducted	Pollster	Client	Area	Sample size	Lab	Con	Ref	LD	Grn	SNP	Others	Lead
23–24 Jun 2026	BMG Research	The i Paper	GB	1,508	27%	19%	26%	11%	11%	—	5%	1
19–22 Jun 2026	More in Common	N/A	GB	2,993	27%	23%	26%	10%	8%	3%	4%	1
12–15 Jun 2026	Deltapoll	N/A	GB	2,035	26%	17%	27%	11%	11%	3%	6%	1
15–19 May 2026	More in Common	N/A	GB	2,599	30%	20%	27%	11%	7%	3%	3%	3
15–18 May 2026	Deltapoll	N/A	GB	1,921	28%	15%	27%	8%	10%	5%	7%	1
4 Jul 2024	2024 general election		GB	—N/a	34.7%	24.4%	14.7%	12.5%	6.9%	2.6%	4.2%	10.3

=== With a different Reform UK leader ===
Find Out Now has concluded a hypothetical poll with the condition that Nigel Farage resigned as Reform UK leader and was replaced by another senior figure such as Zia Yusuf, Robert Jenrick or Richard Tice.

Date(s) conducted	Pollster	Client	Area	Sample size	Lab	Con	Ref	LD	Grn	SNP	PC	Others	Lead
26 Jun 2026	Find Out Now	N/A	GB	2,240	20%	19%	24%	12%	14%	3%	2%	6%	4

== Polling including parties prior to their formation ==
Various pollsters have conducted polls which include political parties that have been founded or speculated upon but not yet registered with the Electoral Commission. Upon registration, these parties' inclusion in polls was no longer hypothetical.

=== Your Party ===
In 2025, Jeremy Corbyn and Zarah Sultana founded a new political party, called Your Party. Prior to the announcement of these plans, polling was carried out about the idea for a hypothetical new party. After the announcement of the plan for a new party, more polling was carried out.

Date(s) conducted	Pollster	Client	Area	Sample size	Lab	Con	Ref	LD	Grn	SNP	PC	YP	Others	Lead
30 Sep 2025	Your Party is registered with the Electoral Commission													
10–18 Sep 2025	Find Out Now/Electoral Calculus (MRP)	PLMR	GB	7,449	21%	15%	36%	10%	7%	3%	1%	4% (Note: Framed as "Your Party Led By Jeremy Corbyn")	3%	15
1–8 Sep 2025	Find Out Now	Electoral Calculus	GB	10,990	20%	16%	34%	12%	7%	3%	1%	6%	3%	14
15–19 Aug 2025	Focaldata	N/A	GB	1,500	23%	18%	28%	14%	7%	2%	1%	4% (Note: Framed as "Your Party (provisional name for new party founded by Jeremy Corbyn and Zarah Sultana)")	3%	5
29–31 Jul 2025	BMG Research	The i Paper	GB	1,528	20%	19%	31%	13%	7%	2%	1%	6% (Note: Framed as "Your Party (provisional name for new party led by Jeremy Corbyn and Zarah Sultana)")	2%	11
24 Jul 2025	Zarah Sultana and Jeremy Corbyn announce they intend to form Your Party													
9–10 Jul 2025	Find Out Now	MultiComms Ltd	GB	1,308	15%	17%	34%	9%	5%	2%	1%	15% (Note: Framed as "A new populist left-wing party... with Zarah Sultana MP and Jeremy Corbyn MP as co-leaders")	1%	17
4–7 Jul 2025	More in Common	N/A	GB	2,084	22%	20%	27%	13%	5%	3%	1%	8% (Note: Framed as "The new left-wing party led by Zarah Sultana and Jeremy Corbyn")	1%	5
20–23 Jun 2025	More in Common	N/A	GB	2,004	20%	20%	27%	14%	5%	2%	1%	10% (Note: Framed as "a new populist left-wing party ... with Jeremy Corbyn as leader")	1%	7
4 Jul 2024	2024 general election		GB	–	34.7%	24.4%	14.7%	12.5%	6.9%	2.6%	0.7%	N/A	3.5%	10.3

The following MRP(s) were also carried out:

Date(s) conducted	Pollster	Client	Area	Sample size	Lab	Con	LD	SNP	Ref	Grn	PC	YP	Others	Majority
10–18 Sep 2025	Electoral Calculus/Find Out Now	PLMR	GB	7,449	117	24	58	42	367	6	5	13	0	Ref 84
4 Jul 2024	2024 general election		UK	–	411	121	72	9	5	4	4	N/A	24 Sinn Féin: 7 Independents: 6 DUP: 5 SDLP: 2 Alliance: 1 UUP: 1 TUV: 1 Speaker: 1	Lab 172

=== Restore Britain ===
In June 2025, former Reform MP Rupert Lowe launched a political organisation called "Restore Britain", advocating a harder line on immigration than Reform UK. Find Out Now were asked by the organisation to poll on a hypothetical new party led by Lowe. In February 2026, Lowe announced that Restore Britain would become a political party.

Date(s) conducted	Pollster	Client	Area	Sample size	Lab	Con	Ref	LD	Grn	SNP	PC	RB	Others	Lead
20 Mar 2026	Restore Britain is registered with the Electoral Commission													
6–10 Mar 2026	Focaldata	N/A	GB	1,086	20%	18%	27%	14%	13%	2%	1%	2%	3% Your 0% Other 2%	7
3–4 Mar 2026	Find Out Now	Restore Britain	GB	2,082	16%	17%	24%	10%	20%	2%	1%	7%	2% Your 1% Other 1%	4
20–21 Feb 2026	Find Out Now	Restore Britain	GB	3,029	16%	16%	25%	11%	18%	2%	1%	7%	3% Your 1% Other 2%	7
14 Feb 2026	Find Out Now	Restore Britain	GB	1,000	15%	13%	25%	10%	20%	4%	2%	10%	2%	5
13 Feb 2026	Rupert Lowe announces that Restore Britain will become a political party.													
15 Jan 2026	Find Out Now	Restore Britain	GB	1,000	14%	15%	26%	10%	18%	4%	2%	9%	3%	8
28 Nov 2025	Find Out Now	Restore Britain	GB	1,000	16%	13%	25%	13%	18%	3%	1%	10%	3%	7
4 Jul 2024	2024 general election		GB	–	34.7%	24.4%	14.7%	12.5%	6.9%	2.6%	0.7%	N/A	3.5%	10.3

== Hypothetical voting scenarios ==
=== Tactical voting combinations ===
YouGov has conducted polling on scenarios wherein only two parties appear to have a chance of winning a constituency.

Date(s) conducted	Pollster	Area	Sample size	Lab	Con	Ref	LD	Grn	Others	Don't know	Would not vote/refused	Lead
Labour–Conservative
15–22 Sep 2026	YouGov	GB	3,025	34%	27%	7%	3%	4%	3%	6%	12%	7
10–12 Feb 2026	YouGov	GB	2,101	29%	28%	9%	3%	6%	2%	6%	13%	1
26–27 Oct 2025	YouGov	GB	2,167	27%	29%	9%	3%	6%	3%	7%	16%	2
23–24 Feb 2025	YouGov	GB	2,178	31%	28%	7%	3%	3%	2%	6%	17%	3
Labour–Reform
15–22 Sep 2026	YouGov	GB	3,099	41%	5%	26%	3%	4%	3%	6%	12%	15
10–12 Feb 2026	YouGov	GB	2,129	35%	5%	31%	2%	3%	2%	6%	11%	4
26–27 Oct 2025	YouGov	GB	2,167	31%	3%	34%	3%	5%	2%	6%	14%	3
23–24 Feb 2025	YouGov	GB	2,178	35%	4%	31%	2%	3%	2%	6%	16%	4
Labour–Lib Dem
15–22 Sep 2026	YouGov	GB	3,002	29%	6%	9%	22%	4%	3%	7%	15%	7
10–12 Feb 2026	YouGov	GB	2,081	21%	5%	11%	29%	5%	3%	8%	16%	8
Labour–Green
15–22 Sep 2026	YouGov	GB	3,013	27%	7%	9%	2%	21%	4%	8%	22%	7
10–12 Feb 2026	YouGov	GB	2,116	20%	6%	12%	2%	30%	2%	8%	16%	10
Conservative–Reform
15–22 Sep 2026	YouGov	GB	3,018	8%	35%	20%	3%	6%	4%	6%	19%	15
10–12 Feb 2026	YouGov	GB	2,089	6%	31%	24%	3%	8%	5%	6%	16%	7
26–27 Oct 2025	YouGov	GB	2,167	6%	28%	27%	4%	8%	4%	7%	16%	1
23–24 Feb 2025	YouGov	GB	2,178	10%	26%	25%	5%	6%	3%	7%	18%	1
Conservative–Lib Dem
15–22 Sep 2026	YouGov	GB	3,044	4%	28%	7%	31%	4%	3%	7%	15%	3
10–12 Feb 2026	YouGov	GB	2,056	3%	26%	8%	34%	5%	2%	7%	12%	8
26–27 Oct 2025	YouGov	GB	2,167	3%	26%	8%	32%	5%	2%	7%	15%	6
23–24 Feb 2025	YouGov	GB	2,178	5%	25%	7%	33%	3%	2%	6%	17%	8
Conservative–Green
15–22 Sep 2026	YouGov	GB	3,033	4%	32%	7%	2%	30%	3%	6%	15%	2
10–12 Feb 2026	YouGov	GB	2,106	3%	29%	9%	2%	37%	2%	6%	10%	8
Reform–Lib Dem
15–22 Sep 2026	YouGov	GB	3,074	3%	4%	26%	41%	4%	3%	5%	15%	15
10–12 Feb 2026	YouGov	GB	2,134	2%	4%	29%	41%	3%	2%	6%	9%	12
26–27 Oct 2025	YouGov	GB	2,167	3%	4%	32%	36%	4%	2%	6%	13%	4
23–24 Feb 2025	YouGov	GB	2,178	5%	4%	29%	36%	3%	2%	6%	15%	7
Reform–Green
15–22 Sep 2026	YouGov	GB	3,052	4%	5%	27%	2%	39%	3%	5%	16%	12
10–12 Feb 2026	YouGov	GB	2,084	2%	5%	27%	2%	42%	1%	6%	11%	15
Lib Dem–Green
15–22 Sep 2026	YouGov	GB	3,055	4%	5%	10%	29%	21%	4%	8%	19%	8
10–12 Feb 2026	YouGov	GB	2,074	3%	6%	12%	26%	25%	2%	9%	15%	1

=== Polls including under-18s ===
In July 2025, the Government announced their intention to reduce the voting age to 16 before the next general election. Following this, some pollsters conducted polling including 16–17-year-olds, although the voting age has not yet been reduced by law.

==== National poll results including 16–17-year-olds ====
Date(s) conducted	Pollster	Client	Area	Sample size	Lab	Con	Ref	LD	Grn	SNP	PC	Others	Lead
14–18 Jul 2025	Focaldata	MultiComms Ltd	GB	1,307	23%	19%	26%	14%	9%	2%	1%	5%	3

==== Polling solely among 16–17-year-olds ====
Some pollsters also conducted polling solely among 16–17-year-olds, or broke out an oversample of this group.

Date(s) conducted	Pollster	Client	Area	Sample size	Lab	Con	Ref	LD	Grn	SNP	PC	YP	Others	Lead
c. Sep 2025	Focaldata	John Smith Centre	UK	512	32%	8%	22%	8%	18%	4%	0%	—	8%	10
7–28 Aug 2025	More in Common	The Sunday Times	GB	1,115	24%	13%	23%	12%	6%	1%	0%	21% (Note: Framed as "A new party led by Jeremy Corbyn and Zarah Sultana")	0%	1
7–28 Aug 2025	More in Common	The Sunday Times	GB	1,115	30%	14%	23%	14%	14%	3%	0%	—	3%	7
14–18 Jul 2025	Focaldata	MultiComms Ltd	GB	274 (oversample)	35%	11%	17%	7%	19%	4%	1%	—	6% Ind 4% Other 2%	16
4–6 Jul 2025	Merlin Strategy	ITV News	GB	500	33%	10%	20%	12%	18%	2%	0%	—	6% Ind 3% Other 3%	13

==== Polling solely among 13–17-year-olds ====
Merlin Strategy conducted polling solely among those who would be eligible to vote in 2029, the latest possible date for the election.

Date(s) conducted	Pollster	Client	Area	Sample size	Lab	Con	Ref	LD	Grn	SNP	PC	YP	Others	Lead
13–19 Sep 2025	Merlin Strategy	New Statesman	GB	1,000	27%	12%	33%	7%	12%	3%	0%	3% (Note: Framed as "A party led by Jeremy Corbyn")	2%	6

== Individual constituency polling ==
=== Great Yarmouth with Great Yarmouth First ===
A poll was commissioned for the constituency of Great Yarmouth for a new (although unregistered at the time) party "Great Yarmouth First" led by Rupert Lowe, prior to the formation of Restore Britain. The sample size of this poll was significantly smaller than standard polling leading to a wider margin of error. Great Yarmouth First was registered with the Electoral Commission as a political party on 4 March 2026.

Date(s) conducted	Pollster	Client	Sample size	Ref	Lab	Con	Grn	LD	GYF	Others	Lead
4 Mar 2026	Great Yarmouth First is registered with the Electoral Commission										
2–4 Dec 2025	Find Out Now	Restore Britain	121	16%	17%	13%	5%	5%	44% (Note: Framed as "Rupert Lowe's Great Yarmouth First")	1%	27
2024 general election		–	40,748	35.3%	31.8%	24.6%	4.3%	2.7%	N/A	1.3%	3.5

== See also ==
- Opinion polling for the next United Kingdom general election
- Seat projections for the next United Kingdom general election
- Leadership approval opinion polling for the next United Kingdom general election
- Preferred prime minister opinion polling for the next United Kingdom general election
