= Opinion polling for the next United Kingdom general election =

Various organisations continually conduct opinion polls to gauge voter intention in anticipation of the next United Kingdom general election. The next general election must be held no later than 15 August 2029 under the Dissolution and Calling of Parliament Act 2022, which mandates that any Parliament automatically dissolves five years after it first met – unless it is dissolved earlier at the request of the prime minister – and polling day occurs no more than 25 working days later.

Most of the polling companies listed are members of the British Polling Council (BPC) and abide by its disclosure rules. The dates of the polls range from the 2024 United Kingdom general election, held on 4 July, to the present.

== Graphical summary ==
The chart below shows opinion polls conducted since the 2024 general election. The trend lines are locally estimated scatterplot smoothing (LOESS) for all polls included in the table below. (Note: As the graph must be manually updated for each new poll, some newer polls may not appear. The dates on which the graph has been updated can be viewed at the file page on Wikimedia Commons.) The bar on the left represents the previous election, and the bar on the right represents the latest possible date of the next election.

== Guide to tables ==
Poll results are listed in the tables below in reverse chronological order. The highest percentage figure in each poll is displayed in bold, and its background is shaded in the leading party's colour. The "lead" column shows the percentage point difference between the two parties with the highest figures. When a poll result is a tie, the figures with the highest percentages are shaded and displayed in bold.

"Green" in these tables refers to combined totals for the green parties in the United Kingdom, namely the Green Party of England and Wales, the Scottish Greens, and, for polls of the entire UK, the Green Party Northern Ireland. The three parties share a commitment to environmental policies, but are independent of one another, with each contesting elections only in its own region.

Most opinion polls do not cover Northern Ireland, whose major political parties differ from the rest of the United Kingdom. In the 'area' column of the tables below, "UK" (United Kingdom) and "GB" (Great Britain) denote polls that do and do not include Northern Ireland, respectively. Plaid Cymru only stands candidates in Wales, the Scottish National Party only stands candidates in Scotland, and the Conservative Party is the only party with its own column below that stands candidates in Northern Ireland.

Due to rounding, total figures may not add up to 100%. The lead is calculated by subtracting the polling percentage of the first-placed party by that of the second-placed party. The first-placed party is shaded with its party colour, and in boldface; the second-placed party is shaded in grey. The table can be sorted by all features; to sort by party vote share, click on the coloured ribbons. Where polls specify parties within 'other', this may be expandable by pressing the [show] button in the 'other' cell.

== National poll results ==
=== 2026 ===
Date(s) conducted	Pollster	Client	Area	Sample size	Lab	Con	Ref	LD	Grn	SNP	PC	RB	Others	Lead
18–20 Nov	Opinium	The Observer	GB	2,050	30%	21%	22%	9%	10%	3%	1%	—	5%	8
18–19 Nov	Find Out Now	N/A	GB	2,941	27%	21%	21%	9%	11%	3%	2%	—	7%	6
15–16 Nov	YouGov	The Times/Sky News	GB	2,252	27%	23%	21%	11%	9%	3%	1%	3%	2% YP 0% Other 2%	4
13–16 Nov	Deltapoll	N/A	GB	2,026	31%	23%	25%	7%	8%	3%	1%	—	3%	6
13–15 Nov	More in Common	N/A	GB	2,134	29%	25%	19%	9%	8%	3%	1%	5%	1%	4
11–12 Nov	Find Out Now	N/A	GB	2,641	27%	21%	21%	9%	12%	3%	1%	—	7%	6
11–12 Nov	Survation	N/A	UK	2,005	29%	21%	23%	10%	7%	3%	1%	2%	4%	6
3–12 Nov	Trajectory Partnership	N/A	GB	1,264	29%	21%	19%	12%	8%	3%	1%	5%	3% YP 1% Other 2%	8
8–9 Nov	YouGov	The Times/Sky News	GB	2,437	27%	21%	20%	12%	10%	3%	1%	3%	2% YP 0% Other 2%	6
6–9 Nov	More in Common	The Daily Telegraph	GB	2,013	28%	25%	20%	9%	7%	3%	1%	6%	1%	3
6–9 Nov	Deltapoll	N/A	GB	2,023	31%	20%	24%	9%	8%	3%	1%	—	4%	7
4–6 Nov	Opinium	The Observer	GB	2,050	28%	20%	21%	10%	11%	3%	1%	—	5%	7
4 Nov	Find Out Now	N/A	GB	2,406	28%	21%	20%	8%	13%	2%	1%	—	6%	7
1–2 Nov	YouGov	The Times/Sky News	GB	2,355	26%	24%	21%	11%	10%	3%	2%	3%	1% YP 0% Other 1%	2
30 Oct – 2 Nov	Deltapoll	N/A	GB	2,215	30%	23%	25%	7%	8%	3%	1%	—	4%	5
29 Oct – 2 Nov	Lord Ashcroft Polls (Note: Pollster is not a member of the British Polling Council.) (Note: Percentages calculated by excluding the number of respondents coded as "Don't know" and "Would not vote")	N/A	GB	5,253	31%	26%	18%	7%	10%	3%	1%	—	5%	5
31 Oct – 1 Nov	More in Common	N/A	GB	2,602	29%	23%	22%	9%	8%	2%	1%	5%	1%	6
30 Oct – 1 Nov	Freshwater Strategy	City AM	GB	1,219	30%	22%	22%	10%	10%	2%	—	—	3%	8
28–30 Oct	Opinium	The Observer	GB	1,523	30%	20%	22%	10%	8%	3%	1%	—	5%	8
28–29 Oct	Find Out Now	N/A	GB	2,514	28%	21%	20%	10%	11%	3%	1%	—	6%	7
28–29 Oct	BMG Research	The i Paper	GB	1,529	31%	21%	22%	8%	8%	2%	1%	5%	2%	9
25–26 Oct	YouGov	The Times/Sky News	GB	2,271	27%	22%	20%	11%	10%	2%	1%	4%	2% YP 0% Other 2%	5
23–26 Oct	More in Common	N/A	GB	3,286	28%	24%	23%	11%	7%	2%	1%	5%	1%	4
23–26 Oct	Deltapoll	N/A	GB	1,932	32%	21%	25%	7%	8%	4%	1%	—	3%	7
21–23 Oct	Opinium	The Observer	GB	2,050	30%	20%	22%	9%	10%	3%	1%	—	5%	8
21–22 Oct	Find Out Now	N/A	GB	2,381	26%	21%	20%	9%	13%	3%	1%	—	6%	5
15–22 Oct	Ipsos	N/A	GB	1,100	32%	24%	20%	9%	8%	2%	1%	3%	0%	8
18–19 Oct	YouGov	The Times/Sky News	GB	2,520	27%	23%	22%	11%	10%	2%	1%	3%	1% YP 0% Other 1%	4
16–19 Oct	Deltapoll	N/A	GB	2,092	30%	22%	24%	7%	8%	3%	1%	—	3%	6
16–19 Oct	More in Common	N/A	GB	3,069	28%	23%	22%	10%	8%	3%	1%	5%	1%	5
14 Oct	Find Out Now	N/A	GB	2,482	25%	22%	22%	10%	11%	3%	1%	—	6%	3
5–14 Oct	Trajectory Partnership	N/A	GB	1,473	30%	21%	22%	10%	8%	2%	1%	6%	1% YP 0% Other 1%	8
11–12 Oct	YouGov	The Times/Sky News	GB	2,393	24%	23%	21%	12%	11%	3%	1%	2%	1% YP 0% Other 1%	1
9–12 Oct	More in Common	N/A	GB	2,101	28%	24%	21%	11%	7%	2%	0%	5%	1%	4
22 Sep – 12 Oct	Find Out Now/Electoral Calculus (MRP)	N/A	GB	10,684	25%	19%	22%	11%	9%	3%	1%	8%	3%	3
9–11 Oct	Freshwater Strategy	City AM	GB	1,235	29%	22%	23%	10%	9%	2%	—	—	5%	6
7–9 Oct	Opinium	The Observer	GB	2,050	29%	20%	23%	9%	9%	2%	1%	—	5%	6
8 Oct	Holborn and St Pancras by-election (Lab hold)													
7 Oct	Find Out Now	N/A	GB	2,590	25%	20%	23%	9%	11%	3%	2%	—	7%	2
4–5 Oct	YouGov	The Times/Sky News	GB	2,312	27%	20%	22%	11%	11%	3%	1%	3%	2% YP 0% Other 2%	5
3–5 Oct	More in Common	N/A	GB	2,088	29%	21%	24%	10%	7%	2%	1%	4%	2%	5
2–5 Oct	Survation	N/A	UK	1,669	30%	19%	24%	9%	8%	2%	2%	2%	3%	6
30 Sep – 2 Oct	Opinium	The Observer	GB	1,552	30%	17%	25%	9%	11%	2%	1%	—	5%	5
25 Sep – 2 Oct	Find Out Now/Electoral Calculus (MRP)	PLMR	GB	6,600	28%	18%	21%	10%	9%	3%	1%	8%	2%	7
30 Sep	Find Out Now	N/A	GB	2,607	27%	17%	23%	9%	12%	3%	2%	—	7%	4
29 Sep	Survation	N/A	UK	1,548	29%	19%	23%	9%	9%	3%	1%	2%	4%	6
25–29 Sep	More in Common	N/A	GB	2,041	27%	22%	21%	11%	9%	3%	1%	6%	1%	5
27–28 Sep	YouGov	The Times/Sky News	GB	2,310	24%	19%	25%	12%	11%	2%	1%	3%	2% YP 0% Other 2%	1
24–28 Sep	Lord Ashcroft Polls	N/A	GB	5,039	28%	22%	19%	9%	14%	3%	1%	—	6%	6
23–25 Sep	Opinium	The Observer	GB	2,050	28%	17%	24%	10%	10%	3%	1%	—	6%	4
23–24 Sep	BMG Research	The i Paper	GB	1,515	28%	20%	23%	8%	9%	3%	1%	7%	1%	5
23 Sep	Find Out Now	N/A	GB	2,559	24%	19%	23%	12%	13%	2%	1%	—	6%	1
22–23 Sep	Survation	N/A	UK	1,224	27%	21%	24%	11%	7%	3%	1%	2%	4%	3
20–21 Sep	YouGov	The Times/Sky News	GB	2,286	23%	21%	21%	12%	14%	2%	1%	4%	1% YP 0% Other 1%	2
18–21 Sep	More in Common	N/A	GB	2,113	26%	23%	22%	11%	8%	2%	1%	6%	1%	3
21 Aug – 21 Sep	More in Common (MRP)	N/A	GB	15,765	26%	22%	24%	11%	8%	2%	1%	3%	2%	2
16–18 Sep	Opinium	The Observer	GB	2,050	27%	18%	24%	10%	11%	3%	1%	—	5%	3
23 Aug – 18 Sep	YouGov (MRP)	The Times/Sky News	GB	16,758	24%	21%	22%	12%	12%	3%	1%	3%	2%	2
16 Sep	Find Out Now	N/A	GB	2,621	25%	18%	23%	11%	12%	3%	1%	—	6%	2
7–16 Sep	Trajectory Partnership	N/A	GB	1,460	30%	21%	22%	10%	9%	2%	0%	3%	2%	8
11–15 Sep	More in Common	N/A	GB	2,038	25%	22%	23%	10%	9%	2%	1%	6%	2%	2
10–15 Sep	Ipsos	N/A	GB	1,033	27%	21%	23%	8%	13%	4%	1%	3%	0%	4
13–14 Sep	YouGov	The Times/Sky News	GB	2,149	23%	20%	23%	13%	11%	3%	1%	3%	1% YP 0% Other 1%	Tie
11–14 Sep	Deltapoll	N/A	GB	2,056	29%	19%	25%	8%	9%	4%	1%	—	4%	4
9–11 Sep	Opinium	The Observer	GB	2,050	27%	19%	25%	10%	11%	3%	1%	—	5%	2
4–11 Sep	Find Out Now/Electoral Calculus (MRP)	Restore Britain	GB	5,500	25%	20%	22%	10%	9%	3%	1%	7%	3%	3
9–10 Sep	Survation	N/A	UK	2,043	28%	21%	23%	10%	8%	2%	2%	2%	4%	5
9 Sep	Find Out Now	N/A	GB	2,565	26%	18%	23%	12%	12%	3%	1%	—	6%	3
6–7 Sep	YouGov	The Times/Sky News	GB	2,371	23%	20%	23%	11%	12%	3%	1%	4%	2% YP 0% Other 2%	Tie
4–6 Sep	Freshwater Strategy	City AM	GB	1,249	26%	20%	25%	11%	11%	2%	—	—	4%	1
4–6 Sep	More in Common	N/A	GB	2,130	24%	22%	23%	12%	9%	2%	1%	6%	1%	1
2–4 Sep	Opinium	The Observer	GB	2,003	28%	18%	24%	11%	11%	3%	1%	—	4%	4
20 Aug – 4 Sep	Survation (MRP)	38 Degrees	GB	8,124	28%	20%	24%	11%	10%	3%	1%	—	4%	4
2 Sep	Find Out Now	N/A	GB	2,280	26%	20%	21%	10%	14%	3%	1%	—	6%	5
31 Aug – 1 Sep	YouGov	The Times/Sky News	GB	2,244	23%	20%	23%	12%	13%	3%	1%	3%	1% YP 0% Other 1%	Tie
27 Aug – 1 Sep	Lord Ashcroft Polls	N/A	GB	5,063	28%	21%	20%	8%	14%	3%	1%	—	5%	7
28–31 Aug	More in Common	N/A	GB	2,522	26%	23%	22%	11%	9%	3%	1%	4%	1%	3
26–28 Aug	Opinium	The Observer	GB	2,003	27%	19%	25%	10%	12%	3%	1%	—	4%	2
26–28 Aug	Survation	N/A	UK	2,149	27%	19%	24%	9%	10%	2%	1%	3%	4%	3
26 Aug	Find Out Now	N/A	GB	2,295	22%	20%	25%	11%	13%	3%	1%	—	5%	3
25–26 Aug	BMG Research	The i Paper	GB	1,579	27%	18%	23%	10%	11%	3%	1%	5%	2%	4
23–24 Aug	YouGov	The Times/Sky News	GB	2,380	22%	20%	23%	13%	13%	3%	1%	3%	2% YP 0% Other 2%	1
21–24 Aug	Deltapoll	N/A	GB	2,022	30%	20%	27%	8%	8%	3%	1%	—	3%	3
21–23 Aug	More in Common	N/A	GB	3,140	27%	22%	23%	10%	9%	2%	1%	4%	2%	4
19 Aug	Find Out Now	N/A	GB	2,287	23%	18%	23%	11%	14%	3%	1%	—	6%	Tie
18 Aug	Survation	N/A	UK	2,013	26%	18%	26%	10%	10%	3%	1%	2%	4%	Tie
16–17 Aug	YouGov	The Times/Sky News	GB	2,441	22%	19%	24%	12%	13%	3%	1%	4%	2% YP 0% Other 2%	2
14–17 Aug	Deltapoll	N/A	GB	2,017	29%	21%	27%	8%	8%	2%	1%	—	3%	2
14–17 Aug	More in Common	N/A	GB	2,055	27%	22%	25%	11%	9%	3%	1%	—	2%	2
12–14 Aug	Opinium	The Observer	GB	2,050	27%	18%	25%	10%	11%	3%	1%	—	5%	2
13 Aug	Clacton by-election (Ref hold)													
10–13 Aug	Survation	N/A	UK	2,004	25%	19%	26%	11%	9%	3%	2%	2%	4%	1
12 Aug	Find Out Now	N/A	GB	2,417	22%	20%	24%	11%	14%	3%	1%	—	5%	2
5–12 Aug	Trajectory Partnership	N/A	GB	1,462	28%	20%	22%	11%	9%	3%	1%	—	7% UKIP 3% YP 0% Other 4%	6
8–11 Aug	JL Partners	N/A	GB	2,017	28%	21%	25%	10%	9%	—	—	—	8%	3
9–10 Aug	YouGov	The Times/Sky News	GB	2,417	24%	21%	22%	11%	12%	3%	2%	4%	2% YP 0% Other 2%	2
7–10 Aug	More in Common	N/A	GB	2,128	27%	21%	25%	12%	9%	3%	1%	—	3%	2
7–10 Aug	Freshwater Strategy	City AM	GB	1,248	23%	23%	26%	9%	10%	3%	—	—	5%	3
5–7 Aug	Opinium	The Observer	GB	2,050	27%	19%	25%	10%	12%	2%	1%	—	5%	2
5 Aug	Find Out Now	N/A	GB	2,225	24%	18%	24%	11%	14%	3%	1%	—	5%	Tie
30 Jul – 4 Aug	Ipsos	N/A	GB	1,033	28%	18%	25%	9%	12%	3%	1%	4%	1%	3
2–3 Aug	YouGov	The Times/Sky News	GB	2,300	22%	19%	23%	12%	13%	3%	1%	4%	1% YP 0% Other 1%	1
1–3 Aug	JL Partners	Bloomberg News	GB	2,048	27%	20%	25%	12%	10%	2%	1%	—	3%	2
30 Jul – 3 Aug	Lord Ashcroft Polls	N/A	GB	5,303	27%	23%	18%	8%	15%	3%	1%	—	5%	4
31 Jul – 2 Aug	More in Common	N/A	GB	3,334	27%	22%	24%	10%	9%	3%	1%	—	3%	3
29–31 Jul	Opinium	The Observer	GB	2,050	27%	17%	23%	12%	12%	3%	1%	—	5%	4
28–29 Jul	BMG Research	The i Paper	GB	974	28%	20%	23%	10%	10%	3%	1%	—	5%	5
25–30 Jul	Convergent Opinion (MRP)	N/A	GB	10,919	26%	21%	23%	11%	10%	2%	1%	—	6%	3
29 Jul	Find Out Now	N/A	GB	2,225	23%	19%	23%	11%	14%	3%	1%	—	6%	Tie
26–27 Jul	YouGov	The Times/Sky News	GB	2,328	22%	21%	22%	11%	13%	2%	1%	4%	3% YP 1% Other 2%	Tie
25–27 Jul	Survation	N/A	UK	1,012	26%	21%	24%	10%	10%	2%	2%	2%	3%	2
24–27 Jul	More in Common	N/A	GB	2,061	28%	22%	24%	12%	8%	2%	1%	—	4%	4
24–27 Jul	Deltapoll	N/A	GB	2,021	27%	19%	27%	8%	10%	3%	1%	—	5%	Tie
22–24 Jul	Survation	N/A	UK	1,021	25%	19%	26%	10%	8%	3%	2%	1%	6%	1
22–23 Jul	YouGov	The Times/Sky News	GB	2,262	21%	20%	23%	14%	13%	3%	1%	4%	1% YP 0% Other 1%	2
22 Jul	Find Out Now	N/A	GB	2,385	22%	19%	24%	10%	14%	3%	2%	—	6%	2
21–22 Jul	More in Common	N/A	GB	3,118	24%	22%	26%	11%	11%	2%	1%	—	3%	2
19–20 Jul	YouGov	The Times/Sky News	GB	2,325	20%	21%	23%	12%	14%	3%	2%	3%	1% YP 0% Other 1%	2
17–20 Jul	Deltapoll	N/A	GB	2,027	28%	18%	28%	10%	10%	3%	1%	—	2%	Tie
17–20 Jul	Andy Burnham is elected as leader of the Labour Party and subsequently becomes Prime Minister													
15–17 Jul	Opinium	The Observer	GB	2,050	22%	20%	23%	11%	14%	3%	1%	—	5%	1
7–16 Jul	Trajectory Partnership	N/A	GB	1,458	24%	20%	22%	13%	11%	3%	1%	—	5% UKIP 1% YP 0% Other 4%	2
15 Jul	Find Out Now	N/A	GB	2,398	19%	20%	24%	11%	15%	3%	2%	—	6%	4
10–14 Jul	Survation	N/A	UK	1,743	24%	21%	24%	11%	11%	3%	2%	2%	4%	Tie
12–13 Jul	YouGov	The Times/Sky News	GB	2,334	19%	19%	24%	13%	15%	3%	2%	3%	1% YP 0% Other 1%	5
10–13 Jul	More in Common	N/A	GB	2,198	22%	22%	26%	12%	12%	2%	1%	—	2%	4
7–10 Jul	Opinium	The Observer	GB	2,050	19%	18%	24%	12%	16%	3%	1%	—	7%	5
8–9 Jul	Find Out Now	N/A	GB	2,076	18%	20%	23%	13%	16%	3%	1%	—	5%	3
5–6 Jul	YouGov	The Times/Sky News	GB	2,285	20%	21%	25%	12%	13%	3%	2%	3%	2% YP 0% Other 2%	4
3–6 Jul	More in Common	N/A	GB	2,119	21%	22%	27%	11%	10%	2%	1%	—	5%	5
3–5 Jul	Freshwater Strategy	City AM	GB	1,240	20%	21%	29%	12%	12%	2%	—	—	4%	8
1–3 Jul	Opinium	The Observer	GB	2,050	20%	19%	26%	11%	14%	3%	1%	—	6%	6
1–2 Jul	Find Out Now	N/A	GB	2,002	21%	19%	25%	10%	16%	2%	1%	—	6%	4
25–30 Jun	Ipsos	N/A	GB	1,045	24%	18%	26%	11%	13%	3%	2%	3%	0%	2
23–30 Jun	Find Out Now/Electoral Calculus (MRP)	PLMR	GB	5,545	20%	18%	23%	11%	15%	3%	1%	7%	2%	3
28–29 Jun	YouGov	The Times/Sky News	GB	2,437	20%	20%	24%	13%	13%	3%	1%	3%	2% YP 1% Other 1%	4
25–29 Jun	Survation	N/A	UK	2,041	21%	19%	29%	11%	11%	2%	1%	—	5%	8
25–29 Jun	Lord Ashcroft Polls	Mail on Sunday	GB	5,064	21%	21%	21%	9%	17%	3%	1%	—	6%	Tie
26–28 Jun	More in Common	N/A	GB	2,852	24%	20%	28%	12%	10%	2%	—	—	3%	4
5–28 Jun	More in Common (MRP)	N/A	GB	14,358	21%	21%	27%	12%	10%	3%	1%	—	4%	6
26 Jun	Find Out Now	Mail on Sunday	GB	2,240	19%	17%	26%	13%	14%	3%	2%	—	6%	7
24–26 Jun	Opinium	The Observer	GB	2,050	21%	17%	26%	12%	12%	3%	1%	6%	2%	5
24–25 Jun	Find Out Now	N/A	GB	2,140	21%	18%	24%	12%	15%	3%	1%	—	6%	3
23–24 Jun	BMG Research	The i Paper	GB	1,508	23%	20%	27%	11%	13%	3%	1%	—	2%	4
22 Jun	Keir Starmer announces his resignation as leader of the Labour Party and Prime Minister, triggering a leadership election													
21–22 Jun	YouGov	The Times/Sky News	GB	2,345	18%	20%	25%	14%	15%	3%	1%	3%	1% YP 0% Other 1%	5
19–22 Jun	More in Common	N/A	GB	2,993	22%	20%	23%	11%	11%	3%	0%	7%	3%	1
19–22 Jun	More in Common	N/A	GB	2,993	21%	22%	28%	12%	10%	3%	1%	—	3%	6
2–22 Jun	YouGov	N/A	GB	19,583	18%	19%	25%	13%	15%	3%	1%	4%	2% YP 0% Other 2%	6
17–19 Jun	Opinium	The Observer	GB	2,050	20%	18%	27%	12%	14%	3%	1%	—	5%	7
16–19 Jun	JL Partners	The Sun	GB	1,946	21%	21%	27%	12%	11%	—	—	—	8%	6
18 Jun	Aberdeen South by-election (Con gain from SNP), Arbroath and Broughty Ferry by-election (SNP hold), and Makerfield by-election (Lab hold)													
17–18 Jun	Find Out Now	N/A	GB	2,113	15%	18%	27%	12%	17%	3%	2%	—	7%	9
14–15 Jun	YouGov	The Times/Sky News	GB	2,308	19%	19%	24%	13%	15%	3%	2%	4%	2% YP 0% Other 2%	5
12–15 Jun	More in Common	N/A	GB	2,097	22%	21%	29%	13%	9%	2%	1%	—	3%	7
12–15 Jun	Deltapoll	N/A	GB	2,035	20%	17%	28%	12%	13%	3%	1%	—	4%	8
11–15 Jun	Survation	N/A	UK	1,003	19%	20%	27%	12%	11%	3%	2%	2%	4%	7
10–11 Jun	Find Out Now	N/A	GB	2,113	16%	18%	25%	13%	17%	3%	2%	—	6%	7
5–9 Jun	More in Common	N/A	GB	2,087	20%	20%	30%	12%	11%	3%	1%	—	3%	10
7–8 Jun	YouGov	The Times/Sky News	GB	2,267	19%	19%	25%	12%	14%	3%	2%	3%	3% YP 1% Other 2%	6
31 May – 7 Jun	Good Growth Foundation	N/A	GB	4,000	20%	19%	27%	12%	13%	3%	1%	—	5%	7
3–5 Jun	Opinium	The Observer	GB	2,050	20%	17%	29%	11%	14%	3%	1%	—	5%	9
3–4 Jun	Find Out Now	N/A	GB	2,940	15%	17%	27%	11%	17%	3%	1%	—	7%	10
31 May – 1 Jun	YouGov	The Times/Sky News	GB	2,342	18%	18%	27%	13%	15%	3%	1%	3%	1% YP 0% Other 1%	9
29 May – 1 Jun	More in Common	N/A	GB	2,211	22%	21%	29%	12%	10%	2%	1%	—	2%	7
29–31 May	Freshwater Strategy	City AM	GB	1,237	19%	19%	28%	14%	12%	3%	—	—	5%	9
26–28 May	BMG Research	The i Paper	GB	1,511	21%	17%	29%	12%	12%	2%	1%	—	5%	8
27 May	Find Out Now	N/A	GB	2,111	16%	18%	25%	12%	19%	3%	1%	—	6%	6
25–26 May	YouGov	The Times/Sky News	GB	2,354	17%	19%	24%	14%	16%	3%	2%	3%	2% YP 0% Other 2%	5
21–26 May	Lord Ashcroft Polls	Mail on Sunday	GB	5,263	19%	21%	21%	11%	18%	3%	1%	—	6%	Tie
22–25 May	More in Common	N/A	GB	2,111	20%	19%	30%	12%	13%	3%	1%	—	3%	10
20–22 May	Opinium	The Observer	GB	1,500	20%	18%	27%	12%	15%	3%	1%	—	4%	7
20–21 May	Find Out Now	N/A	GB	2,773	17%	17%	26%	13%	17%	3%	2%	—	5%	9
14–21 May	JL Partners	The Sun	GB	1,741	21%	19%	29%	12%	12%	3%	1%	—	4%	8
15–20 May	Ipsos	N/A	GB	1,137	20%	19%	27%	12%	14%	3%	2%	2%	1%	7
15–19 May	More in Common	N/A	GB	2,599	23%	18%	29%	13%	10%	3%	1%	—	3%	6
17–18 May	YouGov	The Times/Sky News	GB	2,356	17%	18%	25%	14%	15%	3%	1%	4%	2% YP 0% Other 2%	7
15–18 May	Deltapoll	N/A	GB	1,921	20%	17%	28%	11%	13%	5%	1%	—	6%	8
13–15 May	Techne	N/A	UK	1,639	17%	17%	29%	12%	16%	3%	—	3%	3%	12
5–14 May	Trajectory Partnership	N/A	GB	1,459	26%	18%	27%	11%	10%	3%	1%	—	3% UKIP 1% YP 0% Other 2%	1
13 May	Find Out Now	N/A	GB	2,922	15%	19%	25%	13%	18%	4%	2%	—	5%	6
9–12 May	More in Common	N/A	GB	3,070	21%	19%	30%	14%	11%	3%	1%	—	2%	9
10–11 May	YouGov	The Times/Sky News	GB	2,338	16%	17%	28%	13%	16%	3%	2%	3%	2% YP 0% Other 2%	11
9–10 May	Freshwater Strategy	City AM	GB	1,243	18%	20%	29%	14%	12%	3%	—	—	5%	9
6–8 May	Opinium	The Observer	GB	2,050	19%	18%	28%	11%	16%	3%	1%	—	4%	9
7 May	Local elections in England; Scottish Parliament election; Senedd election													
6 May	Find Out Now	N/A	GB	2,035	16%	20%	25%	11%	20%	3%	1%	—	5%	5
4–5 May	YouGov	N/A	GB	2,377	18%	17%	25%	14%	15%	3%	1%	4%	2% YP 0% Other 2%	7
1–4 May	More in Common	N/A	GB	2,016	21%	20%	28%	12%	12%	2%	1%	—	5%	7
29 Apr – 1 May	Opinium	The Observer	GB	2,051	19%	18%	27%	12%	15%	3%	1%	—	4%	8
26 Apr – 1 May	Deltapoll	The Mirror	GB	3,353	21%	19%	29%	9%	12%	3%	1%	—	6%	8
29–30 Apr	BMG Research	The i Paper	GB	1,521	19%	17%	28%	12%	16%	3%	1%	—	5%	9
29 Apr	Find Out Now	N/A	GB	3,005	17%	18%	24%	11%	20%	3%	1%	—	7%	4
26–27 Apr	YouGov	N/A	GB	2,354	18%	19%	26%	13%	15%	2%	1%	3%	3% YP 1% Other 2%	7
24–27 Apr	More in Common	N/A	GB	2,041	20%	21%	27%	11%	13%	3%	1%	—	3%	6
23–27 Apr	Lord Ashcroft Polls	N/A	GB	5,094	18%	20%	21%	11%	20%	3%	1%	—	6%	1
22–24 Apr	Techne	N/A	UK	1,645	17%	18%	26%	13%	16%	3%	—	3%	4%	8
22–24 Apr	Opinium	The Observer	GB	2,050	19%	17%	28%	12%	15%	2%	1%	—	5%	9
22–23 Apr	Find Out Now	N/A	GB	2,656	15%	16%	25%	11%	21%	3%	2%	—	7%	4
19–20 Apr	YouGov	The Times/Sky News	GB	2,472	16%	17%	27%	14%	17%	3%	1%	3%	2% YP 0% Other 2%	10
17–20 Apr	More in Common	N/A	GB	2,235	20%	22%	27%	11%	12%	3%	1%	—	5%	5
15–17 Apr	Opinium	The Observer	GB	2,014	22%	17%	26%	11%	15%	3%	1%	—	5%	4
15–16 Apr	Find Out Now	Restore Britain	GB	2,284	17%	18%	21%	11%	18%	3%	1%	9%	4% YP 1% Other 3%	3
7–16 Apr	Trajectory Partnership	N/A	GB	1,457	25%	17%	26%	11%	12%	4%	1%	—	3% YP 1% UKIP 1% Other 1%	1
15 Apr	Find Out Now	N/A	GB	2,032	16%	17%	26%	11%	20%	3%	1%	—	6%	6
9–15 Apr	Ipsos	N/A	GB	1,044	19%	19%	25%	14%	17%	2%	1%	3%	1%	6
12–13 Apr	YouGov	The Times/Sky News	GB	2,367	17%	19%	24%	13%	18%	3%	1%	4%	2% YP 0% Other 2%	5
10–13 Apr	More in Common	N/A	GB	2,011	21%	22%	25%	12%	13%	2%	0%	—	3%	3
10–12 Apr	Freshwater Strategy	City AM	GB	1,250	22%	19%	26%	13%	15%	2%	—	—	4%	4
8–9 Apr	JL Partners	The Spectator	GB	3,506	21%	18%	28%	11%	14%	3%	1%	—	4%	7
8 Apr	Find Out Now	N/A	GB	2,869	16%	17%	25%	11%	20%	3%	2%	—	7%	5
6–7 Apr	YouGov	The Times/Sky News	GB	2,320	16%	19%	24%	13%	16%	3%	1%	4%	3% YP 1% Other 2%	5
2–7 Apr	More in Common	N/A	GB	2,009	20%	19%	30%	12%	12%	2%	1%	—	3%	10
27 Mar – 7 Apr	Find Out Now/ Electoral Calculus (MRP)	PLMR	GB	5,599	17%	21%	24%	11%	15%	3%	1%	—	8%	3
1–2 Apr	Find Out Now	N/A	GB	2,330	15%	18%	26%	10%	20%	3%	1%	—	7%	6
27 Mar – 1 Apr	Good Growth Foundation	N/A	GB	2,005	20%	19%	27%	12%	15%	2%	1%	—	4%	7
29–30 Mar	YouGov	The Times/Sky News	GB	2,368	18%	19%	23%	12%	19%	3%	1%	—	5%	4
28–30 Mar	More in Common	N/A	GB	2,003	19%	21%	30%	11%	12%	2%	1%	—	4%	9
26–30 Mar	Lord Ashcroft Polls	N/A	GB	5,447	17%	21%	21%	9%	21%	3%	1%	—	7%	Tie
1–30 Mar	More in Common (MRP)	The Times	GB	15,482	20%	21%	28%	13%	12%	2%	1%	—	3%	7
26–27 Mar	Find Out Now	N/A	GB	3,092	16%	18%	24%	12%	20%	3%	1%	—	7%	4
25–26 Mar	BMG Research	The i Paper	GB	1,507	19%	18%	28%	12%	16%	2%	1%	—	4%	9
25 Mar	Find Out Now	Restore Britain	GB	2,948	16%	16%	25%	10%	19%	3%	1%	8%	3% YP 1% Other 2%	6
22–23 Mar	YouGov	The Times/Sky News	GB	2,435	19%	17%	23%	13%	18%	4%	1%	—	4%	4
20–23 Mar	Verian	N/A	GB	1,236	15%	18%	25%	14%	20%	2%	2%	—	5%	5
20–22 Mar	More in Common	N/A	GB	2,408	19%	20%	27%	14%	12%	3%	1%	—	4%	7
20 Mar	Restore Britain is registered with the Electoral Commission													
18–20 Mar	Opinium	The Observer	GB	2,050	21%	17%	27%	12%	15%	3%	1%	Did not exist	5%	6
18 Mar	Find Out Now	N/A	GB	2,549	16%	17%	25%	11%	19%	3%	1%	Did not exist	7%	6
15–16 Mar	YouGov	The Times/Sky News	GB	2,329	17%	17%	25%	14%	19%	2%	1%	Did not exist	4%	6
13–16 Mar	More in Common	N/A	GB	2,402	20%	21%	28%	12%	13%	2%	1%	Did not exist	4%	7
10–12 Mar	Techne	N/A	UK	1,639	17%	18%	27%	14%	17%	3%	—	Did not exist	4%	9
11 Mar	Find Out Now	N/A	GB	2,793	15%	17%	26%	11%	21%	3%	1%	Did not exist	7%	5
5–11 Mar	Ipsos	N/A	GB	1,062	21%	17%	28%	9%	17%	4%	0%	Did not exist	4%	7
3–11 Mar	Trajectory Partnership	N/A	GB	1,456	27%	19%	24%	10%	12%	4%	1%	Did not exist	3% UKIP 1% YP 0% Other 2%	3
9–10 Mar	YouGov	The Times/Sky News	GB	2,246	17%	19%	23%	14%	19%	2%	2%	Did not exist	4%	4
6–9 Mar	More in Common	N/A	GB	2,112	22%	19%	30%	13%	11%	2%	1%	Did not exist	3%	8
5–6 Mar	Convergent Opinion	Meliore	GB	2,189	19%	19%	24%	13%	15%	3%	1%	Did not exist	6%	5
4–6 Mar	Opinium	The Observer	GB	2,050	21%	16%	29%	10%	14%	3%	1%	Did not exist	5%	8
4–6 Mar	Find Out Now	N/A	GB	2,548	15%	17%	27%	10%	21%	2%	1%	Did not exist	6%	6
5 Mar	Survation	N/A	UK	1,045	21%	18%	29%	10%	12%	2%	2%	Did not exist	5%	8
4–5 Mar	BMG Research	The i Paper	GB	1,503	20%	18%	27%	12%	14%	2%	0%	Did not exist	6%	7
2–5 Mar	JL Partners	The Sun	GB	2,573	20%	20%	27%	12%	14%	3%	1%	Did not exist	4%	7
1–2 Mar	YouGov	The Times/Sky News	GB	2,073	16%	16%	23%	14%	21%	3%	1%	Did not exist	5%	2
27 Feb – 2 Mar	More in Common	N/A	GB	2,010	18%	19%	29%	14%	14%	3%	1%	Did not exist	3%	10
27 Feb – 1 Mar	Freshwater Strategy	City AM	GB	1,221	18%	18%	30%	13%	15%	3%	—	Did not exist	3%	12
27 Feb – 1 Mar	Convergent Opinion	Persuasion UK	GB	4,988	20%	17%	25%	12%	14%	3%	1%	Did not exist	7%	5
25–27 Feb	Opinium	The Observer	GB	2,050	18%	18%	30%	12%	13%	3%	0%	Did not exist	6%	12
26 Feb	Gorton and Denton by-election (Grn gain from Lab)													
25 Feb	Find Out Now	N/A	GB	2,442	15%	18%	26%	12%	18%	3%	1%	Did not exist	7%	8
22–23 Feb	YouGov	N/A	GB	2,325	18%	18%	24%	14%	17%	3%	1%	Did not exist	4%	6
20–23 Feb	More in Common	N/A	GB	2,015	22%	20%	28%	14%	11%	2%	1%	Did not exist	2%	6
19–23 Feb	Lord Ashcroft Polls	N/A	GB	5,576	17%	20%	22%	11%	19%	3%	1%	Did not exist	6%	2
18 Feb	Find Out Now	N/A	GB	2,178	16%	16%	28%	10%	18%	3%	2%	Did not exist	7%	10
13–17 Feb	More in Common	N/A	GB	2,108	22%	21%	28%	11%	12%	3%	1%	Did not exist	2%	6
15–16 Feb	YouGov	N/A	GB	2,384	19%	18%	24%	13%	17%	3%	1%	Did not exist	4%	5
13–16 Feb	Good Growth Foundation	N/A	GB	2,000	21%	20%	28%	12%	12%	3%	1%	Did not exist	3%	7
11–12 Feb	Techne	N/A	UK	1,644	17%	19%	30%	14%	15%	2%	—	Did not exist	3%	11
4–12 Feb	Trajectory Partnership	N/A	GB	1,456	23%	19%	31%	10%	9%	4%	0%	Did not exist	3% YP 1% UKIP 1% Other 1%	9
4–12 Feb	JL Partners	The Sun	GB	2,006	23%	19%	31%	12%	9%	2%	1%	Did not exist	6%	8
11 Feb	Find Out Now	N/A	GB	1,394	16%	19%	29%	11%	18%	3%	1%	Did not exist	4%	10
6–10 Feb	More in Common	N/A	GB	2,035	23%	21%	30%	12%	10%	2%	1%	Did not exist	2%	7
8–9 Feb	YouGov	N/A	GB	2,466	19%	18%	27%	14%	16%	3%	2%	Did not exist	2%	8
4–6 Feb	Opinium	The Observer	GB	2,054	23%	16%	31%	10%	13%	2%	1%	Did not exist	3%	8
4 Feb	Find Out Now	N/A	GB	2,264	16%	18%	31%	11%	18%	2%	1%	Did not exist	3%	13
1–2 Feb	YouGov	The Times/Sky News	GB	2,330	19%	18%	26%	14%	17%	3%	2%	Did not exist	2%	7
31 Jan – 2 Feb	More in Common	N/A	GB	2,005	21%	20%	30%	14%	10%	3%	1%	Did not exist	2%	9
30 Jan – 1 Feb	Freshwater Strategy	City AM	GB	1,250	17%	22%	30%	14%	14%	2%	—	Did not exist	1%	8
28–29 Jan	BMG Research	The i Paper	GB	1,513	20%	17%	32%	11%	13%	3%	1%	Did not exist	3%	12
28–29 Jan	Survation	N/A	UK	1,016	18%	20%	31%	12%	12%	3%	0%	Did not exist	4%	11
28 Jan	Find Out Now	N/A	GB	1,799	17%	17%	29%	11%	19%	3%	1%	Did not exist	3%	10
22–27 Jan	Ipsos	N/A	GB	1,104	22%	19%	30%	12%	12%	2%	2%	Did not exist	1%	8
25–26 Jan	YouGov	The Times/Sky News	GB	2,429	21%	17%	25%	14%	16%	3%	1%	Did not exist	2%	4
23–25 Jan	More in Common	N/A	GB	2,016	22%	20%	29%	13%	10%	3%	1%	Did not exist	3%	7
21–23 Jan	Opinium	The Observer	GB	2,050	22%	17%	31%	13%	11%	3%	1%	Did not exist	3%	9
21 Jan	Find Out Now	N/A	GB	1,385	14%	18%	32%	11%	17%	3%	1%	Did not exist	3%	14
18–19 Jan	YouGov	The Times/Sky News	GB	2,335	19%	18%	24%	14%	17%	3%	1%	Did not exist	3%	5
16–19 Jan	Focaldata	N/A	GB	1,585	21%	20%	26%	14%	10%	3%	1%	Did not exist	4%	5
16–19 Jan	More in Common	N/A	GB	2,007	20%	21%	31%	13%	11%	2%	0%	Did not exist	1%	10
15–19 Jan	Lord Ashcroft Polls	N/A	GB	5,448	18%	21%	25%	11%	18%	3%	1%	Did not exist	4%	4
14–15 Jan	Techne	N/A	UK	1,636	19%	20%	28%	15%	13%	2%	—	Did not exist	3%	8
14 Jan	Find Out Now	N/A	GB	1,592	15%	19%	28%	12%	18%	3%	1%	Did not exist	3%	9
10–14 Jan	Survation	N/A	UK	1,616	21%	19%	29%	11%	11%	2%	1%	Did not exist	4%	8
10–13 Jan	More in Common	N/A	GB	2,036	19%	21%	31%	12%	12%	2%	1%	Did not exist	2%	10
11–12 Jan	YouGov	The Times/Sky News	GB	2,259	19%	20%	24%	16%	14%	4%	1%	Did not exist	2%	4
9–11 Jan	Freshwater Strategy	City AM	GB	1,250	19%	19%	33%	11%	12%	2%	—	Did not exist	3%	14
7–9 Jan	Opinium	The Observer	GB	2,050	20%	18%	31%	12%	13%	2%	1%	Did not exist	3%	11
14 Dec – 9 Jan	YouGov	N/A	GB	17,230	18%	19%	26%	14%	15%	3%	1%	Did not exist	2%	7
7–8 Jan	Find Out Now	N/A	GB	2,422	15%	18%	32%	12%	17%	3%	1%	Did not exist	2%	14
4–5 Jan	YouGov	The Times/Sky News	GB	2,343	17%	19%	26%	16%	15%	4%	1%	Did not exist	2%	7
2–5 Jan	More in Common	N/A	GB	2,021	19%	23%	31%	12%	10%	2%	1%	Did not exist	2%	8

=== 2025 ===
Date(s) conducted	Pollster	Client	Area	Sample size	Lab	Con	Ref	LD	Grn	SNP	PC	Others	Lead
31 Dec	Find Out Now	N/A	GB	2,930	15%	17%	31%	12%	17%	3%	2%	4%	14
24 Dec	Find Out Now	N/A	GB	2,879	14%	18%	30%	12%	17%	3%	1%	4%	12
19–23 Dec	More in Common	N/A	GB	2,026	21%	22%	28%	13%	9%	3%	1%	3%	6
21–22 Dec	YouGov	N/A	GB	2,266	20%	19%	25%	15%	15%	3%	1%	2%	5
16–18 Dec	Deltapoll	The Mirror	GB	1,997	20%	19%	30%	14%	10%	3%	1%	2%	10
17 Dec	Find Out Now	N/A	GB	1,909	14%	18%	33%	11%	17%	2%	1%	3%	15
12–16 Dec	More in Common	N/A	GB	1,582	21%	20%	29%	12%	11%	3%	1%	3%	8
27 Nov – 16 Dec	More in Common (MRP)	The Times	GB	16,083	20%	21%	31%	11%	12%	3%	1%	2%	10
14–15 Dec	YouGov	N/A	GB	2,322	18%	17%	28%	14%	17%	4%	1%	2%	10
12–15 Dec	Verian	N/A	GB	1,427	18%	21%	27%	15%	13%	3%	1%	2%	6
11–15 Dec	Lord Ashcroft Polls	Mail on Sunday	GB	5,196	18%	22%	25%	10%	19%	3%	1%	3%	3
10–12 Dec	Opinium	The Observer	GB	2,053	20%	18%	31%	13%	12%	3%	1%	2%	11
10 Dec	Find Out Now	N/A	GB	2,363	14%	18%	30%	12%	18%	3%	1%	3%	12
7–8 Dec	YouGov	N/A	GB	2,303	19%	18%	27%	14%	15%	3%	2%	2%	8
4–8 Dec	More in Common	N/A	GB	2,009	20%	21%	30%	14%	10%	3%	0%	2%	9
1–8 Dec	Find Out Now/ Electoral Calculus (MRP)	PLMR	GB	5,598	17%	21%	31%	11%	12%	3%	1%	4% YP 2% Other 2%	10
3 Dec	Find Out Now	N/A	GB	2,591	14%	20%	31%	11%	18%	3%	1%	3%	11
30 Nov – 1 Dec	YouGov	N/A	GB	2,366	19%	19%	26%	14%	16%	3%	1%	2%	7
29 Nov – 1 Dec	JL Partners	The Sun	GB	1,537	22%	20%	29%	11%	10%	3%	1%	4%	7
28 Nov – 1 Dec	More in Common	N/A	GB	2,114	21%	21%	30%	13%	11%	2%	1%	1%	9
28–30 Nov	Freshwater Strategy	City AM	GB	1,558	19%	20%	31%	15%	12%	2%	—	2%	11
26–28 Nov	Focaldata	N/A	GB	1,343	20%	18%	29%	13%	12%	3%	1%	3%	9
26–28 Nov	Opinium	The Observer	GB	2,050	21%	17%	31%	11%	13%	3%	1%	3%	10
26–27 Nov	BMG Research	The i Paper	GB	1,548	22%	20%	30%	12%	12%	2%	1%	2%	8
26 Nov	Find Out Now	N/A	GB	2,555	15%	18%	31%	12%	17%	3%	1%	2%	13
23–24 Nov	YouGov	The Times/Sky News	GB	2,399	19%	18%	25%	15%	16%	3%	1%	3%	6
22–24 Nov	More in Common	N/A	GB	2,062	21%	19%	30%	14%	10%	3%	1%	3%	9
19–21 Nov	Opinium	The Observer	GB	2,050	19%	17%	32%	13%	12%	3%	1%	3%	13
18–21 Nov	Focaldata	N/A	GB	1,725	20%	20%	28%	13%	10%	3%	1%	4%	8
19 Nov	Find Out Now	N/A	GB	2,566	16%	17%	32%	11%	18%	2%	1%	3%	14
16–20 Nov	Survation	N/A	UK	2,082	22%	18%	29%	12%	11%	2%	1%	4%	7
16–17 Nov	YouGov	The Times/Sky News	GB	2,355	19%	17%	27%	13%	17%	3%	2%	2%	8
14–17 Nov	More in Common	N/A	GB	2,052	20%	20%	30%	14%	11%	3%	1%	2%	10
13–17 Nov	Lord Ashcroft Polls	N/A	GB	5,038	18%	20%	27%	11%	18%	2%	1%	3%	7
12 Nov	Find Out Now	N/A	GB	2,011	15%	16%	33%	11%	17%	3%	2%	3%	16
9–10 Nov	YouGov	The Times/Sky News	GB	2,366	19%	18%	26%	14%	15%	3%	2%	3%	7
7–10 Nov	More in Common	N/A	GB	2,011	20%	19%	31%	14%	12%	2%	1%	3%	11
7–9 Nov	Freshwater Strategy	City AM	GB	1,250	17%	19%	32%	13%	13%	3%	—	3%	13
5–7 Nov	Opinium	The Observer	GB	2,050	20%	17%	33%	12%	11%	3%	1%	3%	13
5–6 Nov	Find Out Now	N/A	GB	2,717	15%	16%	33%	11%	18%	3%	1%	3%	15
30 Oct – 5 Nov	Ipsos	N/A	GB	1,148	18%	16%	33%	12%	15%	4%	1%	1%	15
2–3 Nov	YouGov	The Times/Sky News	GB	2,376	20%	16%	27%	15%	16%	3%	1%	2%	7
31 Oct – 3 Nov	More in Common	N/A	GB	2,031	18%	19%	31%	13%	12%	2%	1%	3%	12
31 Oct – 2 Nov	JL Partners	The Sun	GB	1,505	23%	17%	30%	12%	10%	3%	1%	5%	7
29 Oct	Find Out Now	N/A	GB	3,065	16%	16%	32%	12%	17%	2%	1%	3%	15
26–27 Oct	YouGov	The Times/Sky News	GB	2,389	17%	17%	27%	15%	16%	3%	1%	3%	10
24–27 Oct	More in Common	N/A	GB	2,030	21%	18%	33%	12%	11%	2%	1%	1%	12
22–24 Oct	Opinium	The Observer	GB	2,030	20%	18%	30%	12%	12%	3%	1%	4%	10
22–23 Oct	Techne	N/A	UK	1,647	19%	18%	29%	16%	12%	3%	—	3%	10
22 Oct	Find Out Now	N/A	GB	2,635	16%	17%	32%	12%	15%	3%	1%	4%	15
19–20 Oct	YouGov	The Times/Sky News	GB	2,396	20%	17%	26%	15%	15%	4%	1%	2%	6
17–20 Oct	More in Common	N/A	GB	2,084	22%	19%	31%	13%	10%	2%	1%	2%	9
16–20 Oct	Lord Ashcroft Polls	N/A	GB	5,038	19%	19%	28%	10%	17%	2%	1%	4%	9
8–17 Oct	Focaldata	N/A	GB	2,057	21%	19%	30%	13%	9%	3%	1%	5%	9
15 Oct	Find Out Now	N/A	GB	2,705	15%	17%	32%	12%	15%	3%	1%	4%	15
12–13 Oct	YouGov	N/A	GB	2,321	20%	17%	27%	16%	13%	3%	1%	3%	7
10–13 Oct	More in Common	N/A	GB	2,004	22%	20%	30%	15%	9%	3%	0%	2%	8
8–10 Oct	Opinium	The Observer	GB	2,050	22%	18%	32%	11%	10%	3%	1%	3%	10
8 Oct	Find Out Now	N/A	GB	2,668	17%	17%	32%	12%	15%	3%	1%	4%	15
5–6 Oct	YouGov	The Times/Sky News	GB	2,333	20%	17%	27%	17%	12%	4%	1%	3%	7
3–6 Oct	More in Common	N/A	GB	2,003	20%	19%	33%	14%	8%	3%	1%	3%	13
3–5 Oct	Freshwater Strategy	City AM	GB	1,251	20%	18%	35%	14%	8%	3%	—	2%	15
1–3 Oct	Opinium	The Observer	GB	2,050	21%	16%	34%	12%	10%	2%	1%	4%	13
26 Sep – 3 Oct	JL Partners	N/A	GB	6,083	21%	19%	31%	13%	8%	3%	1%	4%	10
1 Oct	Find Out Now	N/A	GB	2,611	19%	14%	35%	12%	11%	3%	1%	4%	16
19 Sep – 1 Oct	Focaldata	N/A	GB	2,014	21%	20%	29%	14%	10%	2%	1%	4%	8
28–29 Sep	YouGov	The Times/Sky News	GB	2,585	22%	16%	29%	15%	11%	3%	1%	3%	7
26–29 Sep	More in Common	N/A	GB	1,562	20%	20%	30%	14%	8%	3%	0%	4%	10
24–26 Sep	Opinium	The Observer	GB	2,050	22%	17%	32%	14%	7%	3%	1%	4%	10
24–25 Sep	Survation	Daily Mail	UK	2,027	22%	17%	34%	11%	8%	3%	1%	4%	12
24 Sep	Find Out Now	N/A	GB	2,665	17%	14%	33%	16%	12%	3%	1%	5%	16
31 Aug – 24 Sep	YouGov (MRP)	The Times/Sky News	GB	13,000	21%	17%	27%	15%	11%	3%	1%	5%	6
21–22 Sep	YouGov	The Times/Sky News	GB	2,348	21%	16%	29%	14%	12%	3%	1%	4%	8
19–22 Sep	More in Common	N/A	GB	2,055	25%	20%	28%	13%	8%	2%	0%	3%	3
17–19 Sep	Opinium	The Observer	GB	2,050	22%	17%	31%	12%	10%	3%	1%	4%	9
17–18 Sep	Techne	N/A	UK	1,635	20%	19%	30%	15%	9%	3%	—	4%	10
17–18 Sep	Find Out Now	N/A	GB	4,795	16%	16%	34%	13%	12%	3%	1%	5%	18
11–17 Sep	Ipsos	N/A	GB	1,157	22%	14%	34%	12%	12%	2%	1%	3%	12
14–15 Sep	YouGov	The Times/Sky News	GB	2,384	20%	17%	29%	15%	10%	3%	1%	4%	9
12–15 Sep	More in Common	N/A	GB	2,037	22%	18%	31%	14%	8%	3%	1%	4%	9
11–15 Sep	Lord Ashcroft Polls	N/A	GB	5,082	22%	20%	27%	10%	13%	2%	1%	6%	5
8 Aug – 15 Sep	More in Common (MRP)	The Times	GB	19,520	21%	19%	31%	15%	8%	2%	1%	4%	10
1 Aug – 11 Sep	Focaldata	Dale Vince/Hope Not Hate	TBA	45,335	23%	18%	29%	12%	9%	TBA	TBA	TBA	6
10 Sep	Find Out Now	N/A	GB	2,717	19%	15%	34%	12%	12%	2%	1%	6%	15
7–8 Sep	YouGov	The Times/Sky News	GB	2,500	22%	17%	27%	15%	12%	3%	1%	3%	5
5–8 Sep	More in Common	N/A	GB	2,106	21%	18%	32%	13%	8%	3%	1%	3%	11
3–5 Sep	Opinium	The Observer	GB	2,050	23%	18%	30%	12%	10%	2%	1%	4%	7
1–4 Sep	Techne	N/A	UK	1,644	21%	18%	31%	14%	10%	2%	—	4%	10
3 Sep	Find Out Now	N/A	GB	2,576	19%	17%	32%	13%	11%	2%	1%	5%	13
2 Sep	Zack Polanski is elected as leader of the Green Party of England and Wales												
28 Aug – 2 Sep	Survation	N/A	UK	1,818	24%	19%	30%	11%	8%	3%	0%	3%	6
31 Aug – 1 Sep	YouGov	The Times/Sky News	GB	2,523	20%	17%	29%	15%	10%	3%	1%	5%	9
29 Aug – 1 Sep	More in Common	N/A	GB	2,042	21%	18%	31%	13%	8%	3%	1%	6%	10
21 Aug – 1 Sep	Survation (MRP)	38 Degrees	UK	8,546	25%	19%	29%	12%	7%	3%	1%	4% SF 0% DUP 1% APNI 0% UUP 1% SDLP 0% TUV 0% PBP 0% Other 2%	4
29–31 Aug	Freshwater Strategy	City AM	GB	1,251	20%	17%	33%	15%	7%	3%	—	4%	13
19–31 Aug	JL Partners	The Sun	GB	2,118	22%	18%	32%	12%	7%	2%	1%	6%	10
29 Aug	Gillian Mackay and Ross Greer are elected as co-leaders of the Scottish Greens												
26–28 Aug	BMG Research	The i Paper	GB	1,504	20%	17%	35%	13%	7%	2%	1%	4%	15
27 Aug	Find Out Now	N/A	GB	2,538	18%	15%	34%	13%	10%	2%	1%	6%	16
25–26 Aug	YouGov	The Times/Sky News	GB	2,439	20%	17%	28%	16%	11%	3%	1%	4%	8
22–26 Aug	More in Common	N/A	GB	2,032	22%	18%	30%	14%	7%	3%	1%	5%	8
20–22 Aug	Opinium	The Observer	GB	2,050	23%	17%	29%	14%	9%	3%	1%	5%	6
20 Aug	Find Out Now	N/A	GB	2,615	18%	17%	33%	12%	10%	3%	1%	6%	15
15–19 Aug	Focaldata	N/A	GB	1,500	24%	18%	29%	14%	8%	2%	1%	4%	5
17–18 Aug	YouGov	The Times/Sky News	GB	2,394	21%	18%	28%	15%	10%	3%	1%	4%	7
15–18 Aug	More in Common	N/A	GB	2,000	21%	20%	30%	13%	8%	3%	1%	5%	9
14–18 Aug	Lord Ashcroft Polls	N/A	GB	5,029	23%	20%	27%	10%	11%	2%	1%	7%	4
13–14 Aug	Find Out Now	N/A	GB	2,513	19%	19%	31%	12%	10%	3%	1%	6%	12
10–11 Aug	YouGov	The Times/Sky News	GB	2,501	21%	17%	28%	16%	10%	3%	1%	5%	7
8–11 Aug	More in Common	N/A	GB	2,015	22%	22%	30%	13%	6%	2%	0%	4%	8
6–8 Aug	Opinium	The Observer	GB	2,050	22%	17%	31%	13%	9%	3%	1%	4%	9
6 Aug	Find Out Now	N/A	GB	2,627	20%	16%	32%	12%	9%	2%	1%	7%	12
3–4 Aug	YouGov	The Times/Sky News	GB	2,472	21%	17%	27%	15%	11%	3%	1%	4%	6
1–3 Aug	More in Common	N/A	GB	2,042	22%	18%	31%	14%	7%	3%	1%	4%	9
1–3 Aug	Freshwater Strategy	City AM	GB	1,259	22%	18%	33%	14%	6%	3%	—	3%	11
16 Jul – 3 Aug	Stack Data Strategy (MRP)	Conservative Party (alleged (Note: The Telegraph reported that the data was commissioned by the party, though this has been denied by both the Conservatives and Stack themselves.))	GB	9,301	25%	16%	31%	12%	9%	3%	1%	4% Ind 2% Others 2%	5
29–31 Jul	BMG Research	The i Paper	GB	1,528	23%	18%	32%	13%	8%	2%	1%	3%	9
30 Jul	Find Out Now	N/A	GB	2,654	20%	17%	30%	13%	9%	2%	1%	7%	10
27–28 Jul	YouGov	The Times/Sky News	GB	2,208	22%	17%	29%	14%	11%	3%	1%	4%	7
26–28 Jul	More in Common	N/A	GB	2,153	23%	20%	29%	13%	7%	3%	1%	5%	6
23–25 Jul	Opinium	The Observer	GB	2,050	25%	17%	32%	13%	8%	3%	1%	2%	7
23 Jul	Find Out Now	N/A	GB	2,651	20%	16%	34%	14%	10%	3%	1%	4%	14
20–21 Jul	YouGov	The Times/Sky News	GB	2,273	23%	17%	27%	15%	11%	3%	1%	3%	4
18–20 Jul	More in Common	N/A	GB	2,153	22%	21%	29%	15%	8%	2%	1%	2%	7
17–18 Jul	JL Partners	The Telegraph	GB	2,035	23%	17%	29%	14%	9%	3%	1%	5%	6
14–18 Jul	Focaldata	N/A	GB	1,271	23%	19%	27%	14%	9%	2%	1%	5%	4
16 Jul	Find Out Now	N/A	GB	2,603	20%	17%	30%	13%	12%	2%	1%	4%	10
13–14 Jul	YouGov	The Times/Sky News	GB	2,209	22%	17%	28%	16%	12%	3%	1%	3%	6
11–14 Jul	More in Common	N/A	GB	2,311	24%	20%	27%	13%	9%	3%	1%	3%	3
9–11 Jul	Opinium	The Observer	GB	2,052	24%	18%	29%	13%	9%	3%	1%	3%	5
9–10 Jul	Find Out Now	MultiComms Ltd	GB	1,308	21%	16%	34%	11%	11%	3%	1%	4%	13
9–10 Jul	Techne	N/A	UK	1,628	22%	18%	29%	16%	9%	2%	—	4%	7
9 Jul	Find Out Now	N/A	GB	2,651	22%	19%	31%	13%	9%	2%	1%	4%	9
6–7 Jul	YouGov	The Times/Sky News	GB	2,513	24%	16%	26%	15%	11%	3%	1%	3%	2
4–7 Jul	More in Common	N/A	GB	2,084	24%	19%	29%	14%	7%	3%	1%	3%	5
4–7 Jul	More in Common	N/A	GB	2,084	25%	20%	28%	14%	7%	3%	1%	3%	3
4–6 Jul	Freshwater Strategy	City AM	GB	1,259	23%	19%	31%	16%	6%	3%	—	2%	8
2 Jul	Find Out Now	N/A	GB	2,604	22%	16%	30%	15%	11%	3%	1%	3%	8
29–30 Jun	YouGov	The Times/Sky News	GB	2,392	24%	17%	26%	16%	10%	3%	1%	2%	2
27–30 Jun	More in Common	N/A	GB	2,532	24%	19%	29%	12%	9%	3%	1%	3%	5
26–30 Jun	Lord Ashcroft Polls	N/A	GB	5,018	23%	20%	27%	11%	13%	3%	1%	3%	4
13–30 Jun	More in Common (MRP)	N/A	GB	11,282	22%	21%	28%	15%	8%	3%	1%	2%	6
25–27 Jun	Survation	N/A	UK	1,700	26%	19%	27%	12%	8%	3%	1%	4%	1
25–27 Jun	Opinium	The Observer	GB	2,050	25%	17%	30%	12%	9%	2%	1%	3%	5
25–26 Jun	Techne	N/A	UK	1,628	23%	18%	28%	16%	8%	3%	—	4%	5
25 Jun	Find Out Now	N/A	GB	2,605	22%	18%	30%	13%	11%	3%	1%	2%	8
24–25 Jun	BMG Research	The i Paper	GB	1,617	27%	19%	30%	12%	7%	2%	1%	2%	3
22–23 Jun	YouGov	The Times/Sky News	GB	1,794	23%	17%	27%	16%	10%	3%	1%	3%	4
20–23 Jun	More in Common	N/A	GB	2,004	23%	20%	27%	14%	9%	3%	1%	3%	4
18 Jun	Find Out Now	N/A	GB	2,628	23%	16%	31%	12%	11%	3%	1%	2%	8
29 May – 18 Jun	YouGov	The Times/Sky News	GB	17,227	23%	17%	27%	15%	11%	3%	1%	2%	4
29 May – 18 Jun	YouGov (MRP)	N/A	GB	11,500	23%	18%	26%	15%	11%	3%	1%	2%	3
10–17 Jun	Find Out Now/ Electoral Calculus (MRP)	PLMR	GB	5,444	22%	19%	31%	13%	9%	3%	1%	4%	9
15–16 Jun	YouGov	The Times/Sky News	GB	2,255	24%	17%	27%	15%	10%	4%	1%	2%	3
13–16 Jun	More in Common	N/A	GB	2,032	21%	22%	29%	13%	9%	3%	1%	4%	7
11–13 Jun	Opinium	The Observer	GB	2,050	24%	18%	30%	12%	9%	3%	1%	3%	6
11 Jun	Find Out Now	N/A	GB	2,651	24%	16%	30%	13%	11%	3%	1%	2%	6
10–11 Jun	Survation	Rogan Productions	UK	2,010	25%	21%	27%	12%	7%	3%	1%	4%	2
8–9 Jun	YouGov	The Times/Sky News	GB	2,196	23%	17%	29%	15%	10%	3%	2%	1%	6
6–9 Jun	More in Common	N/A	GB	2,073	24%	20%	28%	14%	7%	3%	1%	3%	4
6–8 Jun	Freshwater Strategy	City AM	GB	1,260	21%	21%	32%	14%	8%	2%	—	2%	11
4–5 Jun	Techne	N/A	UK	1,628	23%	17%	31%	15%	8%	2%	—	4%	8
4 Jun	Find Out Now	N/A	GB	1,962	22%	16%	31%	15%	11%	3%	1%	2%	9
30 May – 4 Jun	Ipsos	N/A	GB	1,180	25%	15%	34%	11%	9%	4%	1%	1%	9
1–2 Jun	YouGov	The Times/Sky News	GB	2,240	22%	18%	28%	17%	9%	3%	1%	2%	6
30 May – 2 Jun	More in Common	N/A	GB	2,016	23%	21%	28%	14%	8%	2%	1%	3%	5
30 May – 2 Jun	Survation	N/A	UK	916	24%	20%	27%	13%	8%	3%	2%	3%	3
29 May – 2 Jun	Lord Ashcroft Polls	N/A	GB	5,147	23%	18%	27%	13%	13%	2%	1%	3%	4
28–30 May	Opinium	The Observer	GB	2,050	25%	17%	31%	11%	10%	2%	1%	2%	6
28–29 May	BMG Research	The i Paper	GB	1,510	24%	18%	31%	13%	9%	3%	0%	2%	7
28–29 May	Techne	N/A	UK	1,647	22%	16%	31%	16%	9%	2%	—	4%	9
28 May	Find Out Now	N/A	GB	2,447	22%	16%	32%	13%	11%	3%	1%	2%	10
26–27 May	YouGov	The Times/Sky News	GB	2,013	21%	19%	29%	15%	11%	2%	1%	2%	8
23–26 May	More in Common	N/A	GB	2,000	22%	19%	31%	14%	8%	2%	1%	3%	9
21–22 May	Techne	N/A	UK	1,641	22%	17%	30%	16%	9%	2%	—	4%	8
21 May	Find Out Now	N/A	GB	2,501	21%	16%	32%	14%	11%	2%	1%	2%	11
18–19 May	YouGov	The Times/Sky News	GB	2,222	22%	16%	29%	17%	10%	2%	1%	2%	7
16–19 May	More in Common	N/A	GB	2,090	22%	21%	30%	14%	8%	2%	1%	1%	8
14–16 May	Opinium	The Observer	GB	2,050	25%	18%	29%	13%	10%	2%	1%	3%	4
14–15 May	Techne	N/A	UK	1,645	22%	18%	29%	15%	9%	2%	—	5%	7
14 May	Find Out Now	N/A	GB	2,557	21%	16%	33%	14%	11%	3%	1%	2%	12
11–12 May	YouGov	The Times/Sky News	GB	2,310	23%	18%	28%	16%	9%	3%	1%	3%	5
10–12 May	More in Common	N/A	GB	2,094	25%	20%	28%	14%	8%	2%	1%	1%	3
9–11 May	Freshwater Strategy	City AM	GB	1,250	22%	19%	32%	15%	8%	3%	—	2%	10
7–8 May	Techne	N/A	UK	1,635	23%	19%	28%	14%	8%	3%	—	5%	5
6–8 May	BMG Research	The i Paper	GB	1,525	22%	19%	32%	13%	9%	3%	0%	2%	10
7 May	Find Out Now	N/A	GB	2,210	20%	16%	33%	15%	11%	3%	1%	1%	13
5–6 May	YouGov	The Times/Sky News	GB	2,187	22%	17%	29%	16%	10%	3%	1%	1%	7
2–5 May	Survation	True North Advisors	UK	2,032	25%	18%	30%	13%	7%	3%	1%	3%	5
3–4 May	More in Common	N/A	GB	2,212	23%	21%	27%	15%	8%	3%	1%	3%	4
30 Apr – 2 May	Opinium	The Observer	GB	2,050	26%	19%	27%	13%	9%	3%	1%	2%	1
30 Apr – 2 May	Survation	N/A	UK	1,056	26%	22%	26%	12%	7%	3%	0%	3%	Tie
1 May	Local elections in England; Runcorn and Helsby by-election (Ref gain from Lab)												
30 Apr	Find Out Now	N/A	GB	1,990	21%	19%	29%	13%	11%	3%	1%	3%	8
27–28 Apr	YouGov	The Times/Sky News	GB	2,214	23%	20%	26%	15%	9%	3%	1%	2%	3
25–27 Apr	More in Common	N/A	GB	2,009	24%	23%	24%	15%	8%	2%	1%	4%	Tie
23–25 Apr	Opinium	The Observer	GB	2,050	26%	21%	26%	11%	9%	3%	1%	2%	Tie
23–24 Apr	Techne	N/A	UK	1,642	25%	21%	25%	14%	8%	2%	—	5%	Tie
23 Apr	Find Out Now	N/A	GB	2,139	20%	20%	28%	14%	13%	3%	0%	2%	8
21–22 Apr	YouGov	The Times/Sky News	GB	2,012	23%	20%	25%	16%	10%	3%	1%	2%	2
17–21 Apr	More in Common	N/A	GB	2,004	23%	23%	25%	14%	8%	3%	1%	4%	2
16 Apr	Find Out Now	N/A	GB	2,288	22%	20%	28%	14%	10%	3%	1%	3%	6
13–14 Apr	YouGov	The Times/Sky News	GB	2,399	24%	21%	23%	14%	11%	3%	1%	2%	1
11–14 Apr	More in Common	N/A	GB	2,277	24%	23%	24%	14%	8%	3%	1%	4%	Tie
11–14 Apr	Focaldata	N/A	GB	1,585	24%	24%	23%	13%	9%	2%	1%	4%	Tie
10–14 Apr	Lord Ashcroft Polls	N/A	GB	5,263	27%	24%	21%	10%	11%	3%	1%	3%	3
8–14 Apr	Verian	N/A	GB	1,285	25%	19%	24%	16%	9%	3%	2%	3%	1
9–11 Apr	Opinium	The Observer	GB	2,050	27%	22%	26%	12%	7%	3%	1%	3%	1
9–10 Apr	Techne	N/A	UK	1,644	24%	22%	24%	15%	8%	2%	—	5%	Tie
9 Apr	Find Out Now	N/A	GB	2,546	22%	21%	26%	14%	11%	3%	1%	3%	4
6–7 Apr	YouGov	The Times/Sky News	GB	2,402	24%	22%	23%	17%	9%	3%	1%	2%	1
4–7 Apr	More in Common	N/A	GB	2,058	24%	23%	24%	17%	7%	2%	0%	1%	Tie
4–6 Apr	Freshwater Strategy	City AM	GB	1,250	22%	27%	28%	14%	5%	2%	—	3%	1
2–3 Apr	Techne	N/A	UK	1,631	24%	23%	24%	13%	8%	3%	—	5%	Tie
2 Apr	Find Out Now	N/A	GB	2,768	22%	20%	28%	13%	11%	3%	1%	3%	6
14 Mar – 1 Apr	More in Common (MRP)	N/A	GB	16,176	24%	24%	24%	13%	8%	2%	1%	4%	Tie
30–31 Mar	YouGov	The Times/Sky News	GB	2,392	24%	21%	23%	14%	11%	3%	1%	3%	1
28–31 Mar	More in Common	N/A	GB	2,081	21%	26%	25%	13%	7%	2%	1%	4%	1
26–28 Mar	Opinium	The Observer	GB	2,050	26%	22%	26%	12%	8%	3%	1%	2%	Tie
21–28 Mar	Find Out Now/ Electoral Calculus (MRP)	PLMR	GB	5,180	24%	22%	27%	12%	10%	3%	1%	3%	3
26–27 Mar	BMG Research	The i Paper	GB	1,544	26%	24%	23%	14%	8%	3%	1%	1%	2
26–27 Mar	Techne	N/A	UK	1,642	25%	23%	24%	14%	8%	2%	—	4%	1
26 Mar	Find Out Now	N/A	GB	2,745	23%	22%	26%	12%	11%	3%	1%	2%	3
23–24 Mar	YouGov	The Times/Sky News	GB	2,333	23%	22%	22%	16%	10%	3%	1%	3%	1
22–24 Mar	More in Common	N/A	GB	2,432	24%	25%	24%	12%	10%	3%	1%	3%	1
19–21 Mar	Opinium	The Observer	GB	2,078	26%	21%	26%	13%	8%	3%	1%	3%	Tie
19–20 Mar	Techne	N/A	UK	1,644	27%	23%	23%	14%	7%	2%	—	4%	4
19 Mar	Find Out Now	N/A	GB	2,770	22%	21%	27%	14%	11%	3%	1%	2%	5
16–17 Mar	YouGov	The Times/Sky News	GB	2,315	26%	22%	24%	14%	9%	3%	1%	2%	2
14–17 Mar	Deltapoll	N/A	GB	1,974	25%	25%	23%	11%	9%	3%	1%	2%	Tie
14–17 Mar	More in Common	N/A	GB	2,432	25%	24%	25%	12%	7%	2%	1%	4%	Tie
13–17 Mar	Lord Ashcroft Polls	N/A	GB	5,111	30%	24%	19%	9%	11%	2%	1%	4%	6
12–13 Mar	Techne	N/A	UK	1,638	27%	22%	24%	14%	7%	2%	—	4%	3
12 Mar	Find Out Now	N/A	GB	2,686	24%	21%	27%	11%	10%	3%	1%	2%	3
9–10 Mar	YouGov	The Times/Sky News	GB	2,291	24%	22%	23%	15%	9%	3%	1%	3%	1
7–10 Mar	More in Common	N/A	GB	2,041	25%	23%	25%	14%	8%	2%	1%	2%	Tie
6–9 Mar	JL Partners	The Sun	GB	2,012	26%	24%	23%	14%	7%	3%	1%	3%	2
5–7 Mar	Opinium	The Observer	GB	1,498	28%	20%	27%	12%	8%	3%	1%	2%	1
5–6 Mar	Techne	N/A	UK	1,632	28%	21%	25%	13%	7%	2%	—	4%	3
5 Mar	Find Out Now	N/A	GB	2,670	25%	21%	26%	12%	10%	3%	1%	2%	1
2–3 Mar	YouGov	The Times	GB	2,222	26%	21%	25%	14%	9%	3%	1%	2%	1
1–2 Mar	Freshwater Strategy	City AM	GB	1,215	24%	23%	27%	15%	7%	3%	—	2%	3
28 Feb – 2 Mar	More in Common	N/A	GB	2,010	26%	24%	24%	13%	7%	2%	1%	2%	2
26–28 Feb	Focaldata	N/A	GB	1,008	24%	22%	21%	14%	8%	3%	1%	5%	2
26–27 Feb	Techne	N/A	UK	1,643	26%	22%	25%	13%	8%	2%	—	4%	1
26 Feb	Find Out Now	N/A	GB	3,363	23%	21%	28%	13%	10%	3%	1%	1%	5
25–26 Feb	BMG Research	The i Paper	GB	1,586	26%	22%	27%	12%	8%	3%	1%	1%	1
23–24 Feb	YouGov	Sky News / The Times	GB	2,415	24%	22%	25%	16%	8%	3%	1%	2%	1
21–24 Feb	More in Common	N/A	GB	2,013	23%	25%	24%	16%	8%	2%	0%	2%	1
19–21 Feb	Opinium	The Observer	GB	2,050	28%	21%	26%	12%	8%	3%	0%	2%	2
19–20 Feb	Techne	N/A	UK	1,639	25%	22%	26%	12%	7%	3%	—	5%	1
19 Feb	Find Out Now	N/A	GB	2,393	24%	20%	28%	12%	10%	2%	1%	2%	4
14–18 Feb	More in Common	N/A	GB	4,101	25%	23%	26%	12%	7%	2%	1%	3%	1
16–17 Feb	YouGov	N/A	GB	2,436	25%	21%	27%	14%	9%	3%	1%	1%	2
13–17 Feb	Lord Ashcroft Polls	N/A	GB	5,099	27%	23%	23%	9%	11%	2%	1%	3%	4
12–13 Feb	Techne	N/A	UK	1,637	26%	22%	25%	12%	8%	2%	—	5%	1
12 Feb	Find Out Now	N/A	GB	3,421	23%	21%	29%	12%	9%	3%	1%	2%	6
9–10 Feb	YouGov	N/A	GB	2,419	25%	21%	26%	14%	9%	3%	1%	1%	1
7–10 Feb	More in Common	N/A	GB	2,005	25%	23%	25%	12%	8%	2%	1%	3%	Tie
5–7 Feb	Opinium	The Observer	GB	1,493	27%	22%	26%	11%	8%	3%	1%	2%	1
5–6 Feb	Techne	N/A	UK	1,645	25%	23%	25%	13%	7%	2%	—	5%	Tie
5 Feb	Find Out Now	N/A	GB	2,487	25%	18%	29%	13%	10%	3%	1%	2%	4
2–3 Feb	YouGov	Sky News	GB	2,465	24%	21%	25%	14%	9%	3%	1%	2%	1
31 Jan – 3 Feb	More in Common	N/A	GB	2,044	24%	26%	24%	13%	6%	3%	1%	3%	2
31 Jan – 2 Feb	Freshwater Strategy	City AM	GB	1,200	29%	28%	22%	9%	7%	3%	—	2%	1
29–30 Jan	Techne	N/A	UK	1,633	26%	23%	24%	12%	7%	3%	—	5%	2
29 Jan	Find Out Now	N/A	GB	2,487	23%	21%	27%	11%	10%	3%	1%	3%	4
28–29 Jan	BMG Research	The i Paper	GB	1,514	25%	25%	24%	14%	8%	3%	1%	1%	Tie
28–29 Jan	Survation	N/A	UK	1,670	27%	22%	24%	13%	8%	3%	1%	4%	3
26–27 Jan	YouGov	The Times	GB	2,523	27%	22%	23%	14%	9%	3%	1%	2%	4
24–27 Jan	More in Common	N/A	GB	2,009	25%	24%	25%	13%	7%	2%	1%	3%	Tie
22–29 Jan	Find Out Now/ Electoral Calculus (MRP)	PLMR	GB	5,743	23%	23%	24%	11%	8%	3%	1%	6%	1
22–24 Jan	Opinium	The Observer	GB	2,050	28%	21%	27%	11%	8%	3%	1%	2%	1
22–23 Jan	Whitestone Insight	Daily Express	GB	2,012	25%	20%	24%	12%	13%	3%	1%	2%	1
22–23 Jan	Techne	N/A	UK	1,643	25%	24%	24%	13%	7%	2%	—	5%	1
22 Jan	Find Out Now	N/A	GB	2,380	22%	23%	26%	12%	10%	3%	1%	3%	3
19–20 Jan	YouGov	The Times	GB	2,466	26%	22%	24%	14%	9%	3%	1%	2%	2
17–20 Jan	More in Common	N/A	GB	2,016	24%	25%	25%	12%	7%	3%	1%	3%	Tie
17–20 Jan	Deltapoll	Institute for Government	GB	1,500	29%	25%	22%	11%	8%	3%	—	2%	4
16–20 Jan	Lord Ashcroft Polls	N/A	GB	5,251	28%	25%	20%	11%	9%	3%	0%	3%	3
15–16 Jan	Techne	N/A	UK	1,624	26%	25%	23%	12%	7%	2%	—	5%	1
15 Jan	Find Out Now	N/A	GB	2,386	24%	25%	25%	12%	10%	3%	1%	2%	Tie
10–14 Jan	JL Partners	The Sunday Times	GB	2,007	26%	25%	22%	13%	9%	2%	1%	3%	1
12–13 Jan	YouGov	The Times	GB	2,279	26%	22%	25%	14%	8%	3%	1%	2%	1
10–13 Jan	More in Common	N/A	GB	1,587	24%	25%	24%	12%	8%	3%	1%	3%	1
8–10 Jan	Opinium	The Observer	GB	2,050	29%	23%	24%	10%	9%	2%	1%	2%	5
8 Jan	Find Out Now	N/A	GB	2,076	25%	20%	25%	11%	11%	3%	1%	2%	Tie
6–8 Jan	More in Common	N/A	GB	2,011	26%	26%	22%	12%	7%	3%	1%	2%	Tie
4–6 Jan	Freshwater Strategy	City AM	GB	1,207	28%	29%	23%	12%	5%	3%	—	1%	1
30 Dec – 3 Jan	Deltapoll	Mail on Sunday	GB	1,532	30%	23%	22%	12%	9%	3%	1%	1%	7

=== 2024 ===
Date(s) conducted	Pollster	Client	Area	Sample size	Lab	Con	Ref	LD	Grn	SNP	PC	Others	Lead
19–23 Dec	Deltapoll	The Mirror	GB	1,552	29%	25%	21%	12%	8%	4%	0%	1%	4
18–20 Dec	Opinium	The Observer	GB	1,472	29%	23%	22%	11%	10%	3%	1%	2%	6
18–19 Dec	Techne	N/A	UK	1,642	27%	26%	21%	12%	7%	2%	—	5%	1
12–16 Dec	Survation	N/A	UK	2,030	30%	25%	20%	11%	7%	2%	1%	2%	5
31 Oct – 16 Dec	More in Common (MRP)	N/A	GB	11,024	25%	26%	21%	14%	8%	2%	1%	3%	1
11–12 Dec	Techne	N/A	UK	1,634	27%	25%	22%	11%	7%	2%	—	6%	2
11 Dec	Find Out Now	N/A	GB	2,659	26%	23%	25%	11%	9%	3%	1%	2%	1
6–10 Dec	More in Common	N/A	GB	2,432	26%	26%	19%	13%	8%	3%	1%	4%	Tie
6–9 Dec	Stonehaven (MRP)	N/A	GB	2,072	28%	24%	21%	13%	8%	3%	1%	2%	4
5–6 Dec	Techne	N/A	UK	1,644	27%	25%	21%	12%	7%	2%	—	6%	2
4 Dec	Find Out Now	N/A	GB	2,607	23%	26%	24%	11%	9%	3%	1%	2%	2
29 Nov – 2 Dec	More in Common	N/A	GB	2,002	26%	28%	21%	13%	7%	3%	1%	2%	2
27–29 Nov	Opinium	The Observer	GB	2,050	29%	25%	21%	10%	9%	3%	1%	2%	4
27–28 Nov	Techne	N/A	UK	1,648	28%	27%	18%	13%	6%	2%	—	6%	1
27 Nov	Find Out Now	N/A	GB	2,316	25%	27%	22%	12%	9%	3%	1%	2%	2
26–27 Nov	BMG Research	The i Paper	GB	1,531	29%	27%	20%	12%	7%	3%	0%	2%	2
26–27 Nov	More in Common	N/A	GB	1,972	27%	30%	18%	12%	8%	2%	1%	2%	3
20–21 Nov	Techne	N/A	UK	1,632	29%	27%	17%	12%	7%	2%	—	6%	2
19–21 Nov	More in Common	N/A	GB	2,002	25%	28%	19%	13%	8%	3%	1%	3%	3
14–18 Nov	Deltapoll	N/A	GB	1,749	29%	27%	18%	12%	8%	4%	1%	1%	2
13–14 Nov	JL Partners	The Sun / Politico	GB	2,024	27%	26%	20%	12%	9%	3%	—	3%	1
13–14 Nov	Techne	N/A	GB	1,643	28%	27%	17%	13%	7%	2%	—	6%	1
11–13 Nov	Opinium	The Observer	GB	1,646	30%	24%	21%	12%	8%	3%	1%	1%	6
8–11 Nov	More in Common	N/A	GB	2,007	27%	29%	19%	11%	8%	2%	1%	4%	2
6–7 Nov	Techne	N/A	UK	1,636	29%	25%	18%	13%	7%	2%	—	6%	4
2 Nov	Kemi Badenoch is elected leader of the Conservative Party												
30 Oct – 1 Nov	More in Common	N/A	GB	2,007	28%	26%	18%	14%	8%	3%	1%	3%	2
30–31 Oct	Opinium	The Observer	GB	1,548	31%	24%	20%	10%	10%	2%	0%	3%	7
30–31 Oct	BMG Research	The i Paper	GB	1,511	28%	29%	17%	13%	8%	2%	1%	2%	1
30–31 Oct	Techne	N/A	UK	1,632	30%	24%	18%	14%	7%	2%	—	5%	6
23–24 Oct	Techne	N/A	UK	1,644	29%	24%	19%	13%	7%	2%	—	6%	5
16–18 Oct	Opinium	The Observer	GB	1,565	31%	24%	20%	12%	8%	2%	1%	2%	7
16–17 Oct	Techne	N/A	UK	1,636	28%	25%	19%	13%	7%	2%	—	6%	3
11–13 Oct	JL Partners	The Telegraph	GB	2,000	29%	25%	19%	14%	7%	2%	1%	2%	4
9–10 Oct	Techne	N/A	UK	1,651	29%	24%	19%	12%	7%	2%	—	7%	5
9–10 Oct	More in Common	The Times	GB	2,000	27%	27%	21%	13%	7%	2%	1%	1%	Tie
5–7 Oct	More in Common	Politico	GB	2,023	29%	28%	19%	11%	7%	2%	0%	3%	1
4–7 Oct	Deltapoll	N/A	GB	2,108	29%	25%	18%	14%	8%	4%	1%	1%	4
2–4 Oct	Opinium	The Observer	GB	1,491	31%	24%	20%	11%	8%	3%	—	2%	7
2–3 Oct	BMG Research	i	GB	1,562	30%	25%	20%	13%	7%	3%	0%	1%	5
2–3 Oct	Techne	N/A	UK	1,643	31%	23%	18%	13%	7%	2%	—	6%	8
25–26 Sep	Techne	N/A	UK	1,638	32%	22%	18%	13%	7%	2%	—	6%	10
24–25 Sep	More in Common	N/A	GB	2,080	30%	26%	18%	13%	8%	3%	1%	2%	4
18–23 Sep	Verian	N/A	GB	1,258	31%	26%	17%	13%	7%	2%	1%	2%	5
18–19 Sep	Techne	The Independent	UK	1,641	33%	21%	18%	13%	7%	2%	—	6%	12
10–12 Sep	More in Common	Politico	GB	1,542	29%	25%	18%	14%	8%	3%	1%	4%	4
29 Aug	BMG Research	i	GB	1,560	30%	26%	19%	12%	8%	3%	1%	2%	4
7–8 Aug	We Think	N/A	GB	1,278	33%	20%	21%	11%	8%	3%	1%	4%	12
5–7 Aug	BMG Research	i	GB	1,523	33%	24%	18%	12%	8%	2%	0%	2%	9
30 Jul – 5 Aug	Stonehaven	N/A	GB	2,048	32%	21%	16%	11%	9%	2%	1%	7%	11
25–26 Jul	We Think	N/A	GB	2,012	36%	22%	17%	11%	7%	2%	1%	4%	14
11–12 Jul	We Think	N/A	GB	2,005	39%	20%	16%	11%	9%	2%	—	3%	19
4 Jul 2024	2024 general election		UK	–	33.7%	23.7%	14.3%	12.2%	6.8%	2.5%	0.7%	6.1%	10.0
4 Jul 2024	2024 general election		GB	–	34.7%	24.4%	14.7%	12.5%	6.9%	2.6%	0.7%	3.5%	10.3

== Sub-national poll results ==
=== Scotland ===
Graph of opinion polls conducted in Scotland

=== Wales ===
Graph of opinion polls conducted in Wales

Date(s) conducted	Pollster	Client	Sample size	Lab	Con	Ref	PC	LD	Grn	Others	Lead
24–30 Sep 2026	More in Common	N/A		22%	16%	27%	18%	5%	9%	3% RB: 2% Others: 1%	5
7–13 Sep 2026	YouGov	ITV Cymru Wales / Cardiff University	1,102	18%	16%	19%	27%	5%	8%	7%	8
13–24 Aug 2026	Survation	YesCymru	845	19%	13%	31%	21%	9%	5%	4%	10
17–20 Jul 2026	Andy Burnham is elected as leader of the Labour Party and subsequently becomes Prime Minister										
7 May 2026	2026 Senedd election										
27 Apr – 4 May 2026	YouGov	Barn Cymru	1,125	8%	12%	26%	30%	6%	13%	5%	4
12–19 Mar 2026	YouGov	ITV Cymru Wales / Cardiff University	1,082	12%	12%	24%	29%	5%	14%	4%	5
5–12 Jan 2026	YouGov	Barn Cymru	1,205	13%	12%	25%	29%	6%	12%	2%	4
28 Nov – 10 Dec 2025	YouGov	Cardiff University	2,500	15%	13%	30%	19%	8%	14%	2%	11
4–10 Sep 2025	YouGov	Barn Cymru	1,220	18%	11%	29%	23%	9%	7%	4%	6
23–30 Apr 2025	YouGov	Barn Cymru	1,248	20%	13%	24%	24%	9%	7%	2%	Tie
10 Mar – 3 Apr 2025	Survation	N/A	844	29%	15%	25%	18%	6%	6%	1%	4
3–5 Dec 2024	Darren Millar is elected leader of the Welsh Conservatives										
18 Oct – 4 Nov 2024	Survation	Reform UK	2,006	33%	18%	21%	13%	9%	5%	0%	12
4 Jul 2024	2024 general election		–	37.0%	18.2%	16.9%	14.8%	6.5%	4.7%	1.9%	18.8

=== England ===
==== 100 most rural constituencies ====
In November 2024, Survation conducted a survey of the 100 "most rural" constituencies in England.

Date(s) conducted	Pollster	Client	Sample size	Con	Lab	LD	Ref	Grn	Others	Lead
14–21 Nov 2024	Survation	Country Land and Business Association	1,007	34%	21%	18%	21%	7%	0%	13
4 Jul 2024	2024 general election (Survation)		–	33.9%	23.6%	19.1%	16.1%	6.0%	1.4%	10.4

==== Northern England and the Midlands ====
In April 2025, Survation conducted a survey of Northern England and the Midlands.

Date(s) conducted	Pollster	Client	Sample size	Lab	Con	Ref	LD	Grn	Others	Lead
11–13 Apr 2025	Survation	Friderichs Advisory Partners	2,032	27%	22%	30%	10%	9%	2%	3
2024 general election		–	–	39.6%	23.8%	17.7%	7.5%	6.8%	4.6%	15.9

==== London ====
Date(s) conducted	Pollster	Client	Sample size	Lab	Con	LD	Grn	Ref	Others	Lead
7–17 Aug 2026	Savanta	QMUL	1,036	32%	18%	10%	16%	18%	6%	14
30 Jun – 8 Jul 2026	Savanta	QMUL	1,038	31%	19%	10%	18%	16%	5%	12
17–23 Dec 2025	Savanta	QMUL	1,006	30%	17%	13%	17%	21%	2%	9
15–21 Dec 2025	Savanta	QMUL	1,006	31%	17%	13%	18%	19%	2%	11
30 Oct – 7 Nov 2025	Savanta	Centre for London	1,242	32%	20%	11%	10%	23%	TBC	9
29 Apr – 21 May 2025	Savanta	QMUL	1,003	32%	21%	13%	13%	15%	6%	11
4–8 May 2025	Find Out Now	Alex Wilson	1,102	30%	17%	16%	15%	19%	4%	11
30 Oct – 11 Nov 2024	Savanta	QMUL	1,004	36%	24%	12%	12%	13%	4%	12
4 Jul 2024	2024 general election		–	43.0%	20.6%	11.0%	10.0%	8.7%	6.7%	22.7

==== Greater Manchester ====
Date(s) conducted	Pollster	Client	Sample size	Lab	Ref	Con	LD	Grn	Others	Lead
23–24 Jan 2026	Find Out Now	N/A	1,003	24%	36%	9%	10%	18%	3%	12
4 Jul 2024	2024 general election		–	43.0%	17.4%	15.9%	9.0%	7.9%	6.8%	25.5

== See also ==
- Leadership approval opinion polling for the next United Kingdom general election
- Preferred prime minister opinion polling for the next United Kingdom general election
- Seat projections for the next United Kingdom general election
- Hypothetical scenario opinion polling for the next United Kingdom general election
- Opinion polling for the 2024 United Kingdom general election
- Opinion polling for the 2026 Scottish Parliament election
- Opinion polling for the 2026 Senedd election
