= Seat projections for the next United Kingdom general election =

Various pollsters attempt to predict the distribution of seats after the next United Kingdom general election, which, due to the system of first-past-the-post voting, has been seen to differ significantly from opinion polling for the popular vote. The dates of the polls range from the previous general election, held on 4 July 2024, to the present.

Multilevel regression with poststratification (MRP) is the most common methodology for projecting seats nationally. Multiple polling companies have conducted such polling and modelling for the next election, these are tabulated below. Also included are some polls compiled via Political Analysis through Regional and Local Insights System (POLARIS), a novel model created by JL Partners which uses council by-elections to predict election outcomes. POLARIS polls from January 2025 onwards are also combined with a representative survey data, with the data used shifted to reflect the pollster's most recent national polling.

326 seats are needed for a majority. The party with the most seats is shaded in its colour, and where a party reaches the majority threshold, in bold. The party with the second-most seats is shaded in grey. All polls so far have been conducted excluding the 18 seats in Northern Ireland.

== Seat projections ==
=== Not accounting for tactical voting ===
Date(s) conducted	Pollster	Client	Method	Sample size	Lab	Con	LD	SNP	Ref	Grn	PC	Others	Majority
25 Sep - 2 Oct 2026	Electoral Calculus/Find Out Now	PLMR	MRP	6,699	**344**	85	69	38	86	4	5	10 RB: 1 Others: 9	Lab 38
21 Aug – 21 Sep 2026	More in Common	N/A	MRP	15,765	250	125	63	27	147	3	6	10 RB: 1 Others: 9	Hung (Lab −76)
23 Aug – 18 Sep 2026	YouGov	N/A	MRP	16,758	241	130	71	40	123	9	15	3	Hung (Lab −85)
4–11 Sep 2026	Electoral Calculus / Find Out Now	Restore Britain	MRP	5,549	261	145	53	31	127	7	6	2 RB: 1 Others: 1	Hung (Lab −65)
20 Aug – 4 Sep 2026	Survation	38 Degrees	MRP	8,124	272	86	69	40	153	3	8	1	Hung (Lab −54)
25–30 Jul 2026	Convergent Opinion	N/A	MRP	10,919	245	99	67	25	174	7	8	7	Hung (Lab −81)
22–27 Jul 2026	Survation	Hope not Hate	MRP	10,014	197	71	72	46	227	4	9	5	Hung (Ref −99)
23–30 Jun 2026	Electoral Calculus / Find Out Now	PLMR	MRP	5,545	195	124	71	39	166	30	3	4 RB: 1 Others: 3	Hung (Lab −131)
5–28 Jun 2026	More in Common	N/A	MRP	14,358	110	96	66	37	293	10	9	10	Hung (Ref −33)
27 Mar – 7 Apr 2026	Electoral Calculus / Find Out Now	PLMR	MRP	5,599	77	90	57	45	273	71	13	5	Hung (Ref −53)
1–30 Mar 2026	More in Common	The Times	MRP	15,482	101	81	62	26	324	22	5	10	Hung (Ref −2)
27 Nov – 16 Dec 2025	More in Common	The Times	MRP	16,083	85	70	35	40	**381**	9	5	6	Ref 112
1–8 Dec 2025	Electoral Calculus / Find Out Now	PLMR	MRP	5,596	30	47	56	41	**398**	52	4	4 YP: 4	Ref 146
31 Aug – 24 Sep 2025	YouGov	N/A	MRP	13,000	144	45	78	37	311	7	6	3	Hung (Ref −15)
10–18 Sep 2025	Electoral Calculus / Find Out Now	PLMR	MRP	7,449	73	7	42	41	**445**	6	5	0	Ref 240
9 Aug – 15 Sep 2025	More in Common (MRP)	The Times	MRP	19,520	90	41	69	34	**373**	6	4	14	Ref 96
21 Aug – 1 Sep 2025	Survation	38 Degrees	MRP	8,546	191	42	63	30	293	6	2	5 (Note: Calculated by subtraction)	Hung (Ref −33)
16 Jul – 3 Aug 2025	Stack Data Strategy (Note: Percentages calculated by excluding the number of respondents coded as "Don't know" and "Would not vote")	Conservative Party (alleged (Note: The Telegraph reported that the data was commissioned by the party, though this has been denied by both the Conservatives and Stack themselves.))	MRP	9,301	161	14	63	37	**348**	3	4	2	Ref 46
13–30 Jun 2025	More in Common	N/A	MRP	11,282	126	81	73	42	290	7	4	8	Hung (Ref −36)
29 May – 18 Jun 2025	YouGov	N/A	MRP	11,500	178	46	81	38	271	7	7	3	Hung (Ref −55)
10–17 Jun 2025	Electoral Calculus / Find Out Now	PLMR	MRP	5,444	118	29	69	26	**377**	4	4	5	Ref 104
14 Mar – 1 Apr 2025	More in Common	N/A	MRP	16,176	165	165	67	35	180	4	5	10	Hung (Ref −146)
Mar 2025	JL Partners	N/A	POLARIS	306,817	218	136	70	41	135	5	3	21 Ind / WPB: 20; Spk: 1	Hung (Lab −108) (Note: Seats total 647, not 650: 628 projected for GB, plus 18 N.I. plus Speaker.)
21–28 Mar 2025	Electoral Calculus / Find Out Now	PLMR	MRP	5,180	180	133	49	30	227	4	4	5	Hung (Ref −99)
Jan 2025	JL Partners	N/A	POLARIS	306,817	200	190	70	42	102	7	4	17 Ind / WPB: 16; Spk: 1	Hung (Lab −126)
22–29 Jan 2025	Electoral Calculus / Find Out Now	PLMR	MRP	5,743	174	178	57	37	175	4	2	5	Hung (Con −148)
30 Nov 2024 – 5 Jan 2025	Focaldata	Hope not Hate	MRP	17,790	287	163	63	22	76	4	4	13	Hung (Lab −39)
Dec 2024	JL Partners	N/A	POLARIS	280,000	256	208	66	6	71	5	4	16 Ind / WPB: 15; Spk: 1	Hung (Lab −70)
31 Oct – 16 Dec 2024	More in Common	N/A	MRP	11,024	228	222	58	37	72	2	4	26 (Note: Polling was of GB adults only, but 18 seats were assigned to Northern Irish parties in the reporting of the outcome.)	Hung (Lab −98)
6–9 Dec 2024	Stonehaven	N/A	MRP	2,072	278	157	47	24	120	3	2	19	Hung (Lab −48)
4 Jul 2024	2024 general election		–		**411**	121	72	9	5	4	4	6 Ind: 5 Spk: 1	Lab 172

=== Accounting for tactical voting ===
Date(s) conducted	Pollster	Client	Method	Sample size	Lab	Con	LD	SNP	Ref	Grn	PC	Others	Majority
25 Sep - 2 Oct 2026	Electoral Calculus/Find Out Now	PLMR	MRP	6,699	**353**	90	70	28	81	4	5	1 RB: 1 Others: 0	Lab 56
4–11 Sep 2026	Electoral Calculus / Find Out Now	Restore Britain	MRP	5,549	288	165	61	18	84	7	7	2 RB: 1 Others: 1	Hung (Lab −38)
23–30 Jun 2026	Electoral Calculus / Find Out Now	PLMR	MRP	5,545	217	151	72	28	127	30	3	4 RB: 1 Others: 3	Hung (Lab −109)
27 Mar – 7 Apr 2026	Electoral Calculus / Find Out Now	PLMR	MRP	5,599	86	159	61	44	188	71	17	6	Hung (Ref −138)
1–8 Dec 2025	Electoral Calculus / Find Out Now	PLMR	MRP	5,596	41	92	60	44	**335**	52	4	4 YP: 4	Ref 20
10–18 Sep 2025	Electoral Calculus / Find Out Now	PLMR	MRP	7,449	117	24	58	42	**367**	6	5	0	Ref 84
4 Jul 2024	2024 general election		–		**411**	121	72	9	5	4	4	6 Ind: 5 Spk: 1	Lab 172

== See also ==
- Opinion polling for the next United Kingdom general election
