= Green parties in the United Kingdom =

In the United Kingdom, the Green Party, or Greens, may refer to one of three Green political parties that operate in the United Kingdom, or in general use, all three of them collectively. There is no longer one "Green Party" covering the entire United Kingdom since the UK Green Party split in 1990. The three green parties are:

- Green Party of England and Wales;
  - Wales Green Party, its Welsh branch
- Scottish Greens; and
- Green Party Northern Ireland, the Northern Ireland branch party of the Green Party (Ireland)

The three Green parties are members of:

- European Green Party, a federation of Green parties across more than 30 countries in Europe; and
- Global Greens, an international network of Green parties who implement the Global Greens Charter.

May also refer to: Green Party (UK), a defunct green party in the United Kingdom.

These parties do not contest elections against each other as they only operate in the named constituent countries of the United Kingdom. Sometimes these are collectively referred to as "(The) Green Party", for example in the media and opinion polls.

== History ==
PEOPLE was founded as a political party in November 1972 by Tony and Lesley Whittaker, Freda Sanders, and Michael Benfield, a group of Coventry business people who were concerned about the state of economics, employment, defence, energy (fuel) supplies, land tenure, pollution and social security, as then seen within an ecological perspective. After the 1975 Conference, PEOPLE changed its name to the Ecology Party to gain more recognition as a party of environmental concern.

The Ecology Party was seen as the second step for Green politics in the United Kingdom. In 1976, the party won its first seats on Rother District Council, East Sussex, and on Kempsey Parish Council, Hereford & Worcester. Jonathan Tyler was elected Chairman of the Ecology Party that same year, and both Tony and Lesley Whittaker took a step back from active involvement in the party. The 1977 Party Conference saw Jonathan Porritt elected to its National Executive Committee. In the 1979 and 1983 General Elections, membership and recognition of the Ecology Party greatly increased. By July 1980, consensus in the Ecology Party was focusing towards decentralisation and non-violent direct action. Following the success of the Social Democratic Party in the UK and Die Grunen in Germany, the Ecology Party resolved to change its name to the Green Party.

The Green Party of the United Kingdom was founded in June 1985. The party had increased success in the 1987 general election. In 1990, the Scottish and Northern Irish branches of the Green Party voted to break away and form their own parties, citing differences in opinion on party policy and the growing support for Scottish independence. The remainder of the Green Party became the Green Party of England and Wales, of which the Welsh and London branches operate with a degree of autonomy.

In 2006, the Green Party of Northern Ireland resolved to amalgamate with, and become a branch of, the Green Party of Ireland.

In July 2018, the Wales Green Party held a vote to decide on whether or not to separate from the Green Party of England and Wales and become a separate party. Of those who voted, 65% voted in favour of the status quo.

All three Green parties used to be members of the Greens-European Free Alliance from its inception until the United Kingdom's departure from the European Union in 2020. The Greens/EFA is the political grouping in the European Parliament, comprising Green and regionalist parties from across the member states.

== See also ==
- British Left
- Green party
- Isle of Man Green Party
- List of green political parties
