= Parliamentary constituencies in Cleveland =

List of Parliamentary constituencies in Cleveland, Northern England

Cleveland was abolished in 1996 both as a county council and a non-metropolitan county, being succeeded by the unitary authorities of Hartlepool, Middlesbrough, Redcar and Cleveland, and Stockton-on-Tees. The constituency boundaries used up to the 2005 United Kingdom general election were drawn up when the county still existed. For the review which came into effect for the 2010 general election, the four authorities were considered separately, with Middlesbrough and Redcar and Cleveland being combined.

For the 2023 review of Westminster constituencies, coming into effect for the 2024 United Kingdom general election, the Boundary Commission for England considered the area comprising the Tees Valley Combined Authority, which also includes the unitary authority of Darlington, as a sub-region of the North East Region. For the purposes of this series of articles, the constituency of Darlington continues to be included in List of parliamentary constituencies in County Durham.

The area is divided into 6 parliamentary constituencies – 3 borough constituencies and 3 county constituencies.

== Constituencies ==
† Conservative ‡ Labour ¤ Reform UK

| Constituency (Note: BC denotes borough constituency, CC denotes county constituency.) | Electorate | Majority (Note: The majority is the number of votes the winning candidate receives more than their nearest rival.) | Member of Parliament | Nearest opposition | Electoral wards | Map |
|---|---|---|---|---|---|---|
| Hartlepool BC | 71,437 | 7,698 | Jonathan Brash‡ | Amanda Napper¤ | Hartlepool Borough Council: Burn Valley, De Bruce, Fens and Greatham, Foggy Furze, Hart, Headland and Harbour, Manor House, Rossmere, Rural West, Seaton, Throston, Victoria. | |
| Middlesbrough and Thornaby East BC | 75,123 | 9,192 | Andy McDonald‡ | Patrick Seargeant¤ | Middlesbrough Borough Council: Acklam, Ayresome, Berwick Hills and Pallister, Brambles and Thorntree, Central, Kader, Linthorpe, Longlands and Beechwood, Newport, North Ormesby, Park, Trimdon. Stockton-on-Tees Borough Council: Mandale and Victoria, Stainsby Hill. | |
| Middlesbrough South and East Cleveland CC | 70,328 | 214 | Luke Myer‡ | Simon Clarke† | Middlesbrough Borough Council: Coulby Newham, Hemlington, Ladgate, Marton East, Marton West, Nunthorpe, Park End and Beckfield, Stainton and Thornton. Redcar and Cleveland Borough Council: Belmont, Brotton, Guisborough, Hutton, Lockwood, Loftus, Skelton East, Skelton West. | |
| Redcar BC | 70,241 | 3,323 | Anna Turley‡ | Jacob Young† | Redcar and Cleveland Borough Council: Coatham, Dormanstown, Eston, Grangetown, Kirkleatham, Longbeck, Newcomen, Normanby, Ormesby, St Germain's, Saltburn, South Bank, Teesville, West Dyke, Wheatlands, Zetland. | |
| Stockton North CC | 70,242 | 7,939 | Chris McDonald‡ | John McDermottroe¤ | Stockton-on-Tees Borough Council: Billingham Central, Billingham East, Billingham North, Billingham South, Billingham West, Hardwick and Salters Lane, Newtown, Northern Parishes, Norton North, Norton South, Norton West, Parkfield and Oxbridge, Roseworth, Stockton Town Centre. | |
| Stockton West CC | 69,664 | 2,139 | Matt Vickers† | Joe Dancey‡ | Darlington Borough Council: Hurworth, Sadberge and Middleton St. George. Stockton-on-Tees Borough Council: Bishopsgarth and Elm Tree, Eaglescliffe, Fairfield, Grangefield, Hartburn, Ingleby Barwick East, Ingleby Barwick West, Village, Western Parishes, Yarm. | |

== Boundary changes ==
=== 2024 ===
See 2023 review of Westminster constituencies for further details.

Name (2010–2024)
1. Hartlepool BC
2. Middlesbrough BC
3. Middlesbrough South and East Cleveland CC
4. Redcar BC
5. Stockton North BC
6. Stockton South BC
Boundaries 2010–2024

Parliamentary constituencies in Cleveland (2010–2024)

Name (2024–present)
1. Hartlepool BC
2. Middlesbrough and Thornaby East BC
3. Middlesbrough South and East Cleveland CC
4. Redcar BC
5. Stockton North CC
6. Stockton West CC
Boundaries (2024–present)

Parliamentary constituencies in Cleveland (2024–present)

For the 2023 review of Westminster constituencies, which redrew the constituency map ahead of the 2024 United Kingdom general election, the Boundary Commission for England opted to combine the four unitary authorities which make up the former county of Cleveland with the Borough of Darlington (previously considered with County Durham) to form a Tees Valley sub-division of the North East region. The commission also opted to rename Middlesbrough to Middlesbrough and Thornaby East, and rename Stockton South to Stockton West.

The following seats resulted from the boundary review:

Containing electoral wards in Hartlepool

- Hartlepool

Containing electoral wards in Middlesbrough

- Middlesbrough and Thornaby East (part)
- Middlesbrough South and East Cleveland (part)

Containing electoral wards in Redcar and Cleveland

- Middlesbrough South and East Cleveland (part)
- Redcar

Containing electoral wards in Stockton-on-Tees

- Middlesbrough and Thornaby East (part)
- Stockton North
- Stockton West (part also in Darlington)

=== 2010 ===
Under the Fifth Periodic Review of Westminster constituencies, the Boundary Commission for England decided to retain Cleveland's constituencies for the 2010 election, making minor changes to realign constituency boundaries with the boundaries of existing local government wards and to reduce the electoral disparity between Stockton North and Stockton South.

Name
1. Hartlepool BC
2. Middlesbrough BC
3. Middlesbrough South and East Cleveland CC
4. Redcar BC
5. Stockton North BC
6. Stockton South BC
Boundaries 1997–2010

Parliamentary constituencies in Cleveland (1997-2010)

Boundaries 2010–2024

Parliamentary constituencies in Cleveland (2010-2024)

== Results history ==
Primary data source: House of Commons research briefing - General election results from 1918 to 2019

=== 2024 ===
The number of votes cast for each political party who fielded candidates in constituencies comprising Cleveland in the 2024 general election were as follows:

| Party | Votes | % | Change from 2019 | Seats | Change from 2019 |
|---|---|---|---|---|---|
| Labour | 100,144 | 43.1% | ▲2.5% | 5 | ▲2 |
| Conservative | 70,935 | 30.5% | ▼13.0% | 1 | ▼2 |
| Reform | 39,000 | 16.8% | ▲9.1% | 0 | 0 |
| Greens | 8,472 | 3.6% | ▲2.7% | 0 | 0 |
| Liberal Democrats | 7,519 | 3.2% | ▼0.9 | 0 | 0 |
| Others | 6,124 | 2.6% | ▼0.6% | 0 | 0 |
| Total | 232,194 | 100.0 | | 6 | |

=== 2019 ===
The number of votes cast for each political party who fielded candidates in constituencies comprising Cleveland in the 2019 general election were as follows:

| Party | Votes | % | Change from 2017 | Seats | Change from 2017 |
|---|---|---|---|---|---|
| Conservative | 112,092 | 43.5% | ▲4.7% | 3 | ▲2 |
| Labour | 104,691 | 40.6% | ▼13.2% | 3 | ▼2 |
| Liberal Democrats | 10,452 | 4.1% | ▲1.5% | 0 | 0 |
| Greens | 2,257 | 0.9% | ▲0.5% | 0 | 0 |
| Brexit | 19,837 | 7.7% | new | 0 | 0 |
| Others | 8,465 | 3.2% | ▼1.2% | 0 | 0 |
| Total | 257,794 | 100.0 | | 6 | |

=== Percentage votes ===
| Election year | 1983 | 1987 | 1992 | 1997 | 2001 | 2005 | 2010 | 2015 | 2017 | 2019 | 2024 |
|---|---|---|---|---|---|---|---|---|---|---|---|
| Labour | 37.9 | 44.7 | 50.0 | 62.4 | 59.5 | 51.9 | 39.9 | 43.3 | 53.8 | 40.6 | 43.1 |
| Conservative | 35.8 | 33.8 | 37.1 | 25.2 | 26.3 | 23.0 | 27.7 | 29.0 | 38.8 | 43.5 | 30.5 |
| Reform UK^{1} | - | - | - | - | - | - | - | - | - | 7.7 | 16.8 |
| Green Party | - | * | * | * | * | * | - | 2.3 | 0.4 | 0.9 | 3.6 |
| Liberal Democrat^{2} | 26.2 | 20.9 | 12.8 | 9.8 | 12.4 | 19.3 | 21.4 | 5.3 | 2.6 | 4.1 | 3.2 |
| UKIP | - | - | - | * | * | * | 4.3 | 17.9 | 4.2 | * | * |
| Other | 0.1 | 0.6 | 0.2 | 2.6 | 1.8 | 5.8 | 6.7 | 2.2 | 0.2 | 3.2 | 2.6 |

^{1}As the Brexit Party in 2019 ^{2}1983 & 1987 - SDP–Liberal Alliance

* Included in Other

=== Seats ===
| Election year | 1983 | 1987 | 1992 | 1997 | 2001 | 2005 | 2010 | 2015 | 2017 | 2019 | 2024 |
|---|---|---|---|---|---|---|---|---|---|---|---|
| Labour | 4 | 4 | 4 | 6 | 6 | 6 | 4 | 5 | 5 | 3 | 5 |
| Conservative | 1 | 2 | 2 | 0 | 0 | 0 | 1 | 1 | 1 | 3 | 1 |
| Liberal Democrat^{1} | 1 | 0 | 0 | 0 | 0 | 0 | 1 | 0 | 0 | 0 | |
| Total | 6 | 6 | 6 | 6 | 6 | 6 | 6 | 6 | 6 | 6 | 6 |

^{1}1983 & 1987 - SDP–Liberal Alliance

=== Maps ===
==== 1983 to 2019 ====
1983

1987

1992

1997

2001

2005

2010

2015

2017

2019

==== 2024 to present (including one cross-county constituency) ====
2024

== Historical representation by party ==
=== 1983 to 2010 ===
Conservative Labour Social Democratic

| Constituency | 1983 | 1987 | 91 | 1992 | 1997 | 2001 | 04 | 2005 |
|---|---|---|---|---|---|---|---|---|
| Hartlepool | Leadbitter | | | Mandelson | | | Wright | |
| Langbaurgh / Middlesbrough S & E Cleveland (1997) | Holt | | Kumar | Bates | Kumar | | | |
| Middlesbrough | Bell | | | | | | | |
| Redcar | Tinn | Mowlam | | | | Baird | | |
| Stockton North | Cook | | | | | | | |
| Stockton South | Wrigglesworth | Devlin | | | Taylor | | | |

=== 2010 to present ===
Conservative Independent Labour Liberal Democrats

| Constituency | 2010 | 12 | 2015 | 2017 | 2019 | 21 | 23 | 24 | 2024 |
|---|---|---|---|---|---|---|---|---|---|
| Hartlepool | Wright | | | Hill | | Mortimer | | | Brash |
| Middlesbrough / Middlesbrough & Thornaby E (2024) | Bell | McDonald | | | | | → | → | |
| Middlesbrough South & East Cleveland | Blenkinsop | | | Clarke | | | | | Myer |
| Redcar | Swales | | Turley | | Young | | | | Turley |
| Stockton North | Cunningham | | | | | | | | McDonald |
| Stockton South / Stockton West (2024)^{1} | Wharton | | | Williams | Vickers | | | | |

^{1}also includes some areas in the Darlington area of County Durham

== See also ==
- List of parliamentary constituencies in the North East (region)
- History of parliamentary constituencies and boundaries in Cleveland
