= Matt Vickers =

British Conservative politician

Matt Vickers MP
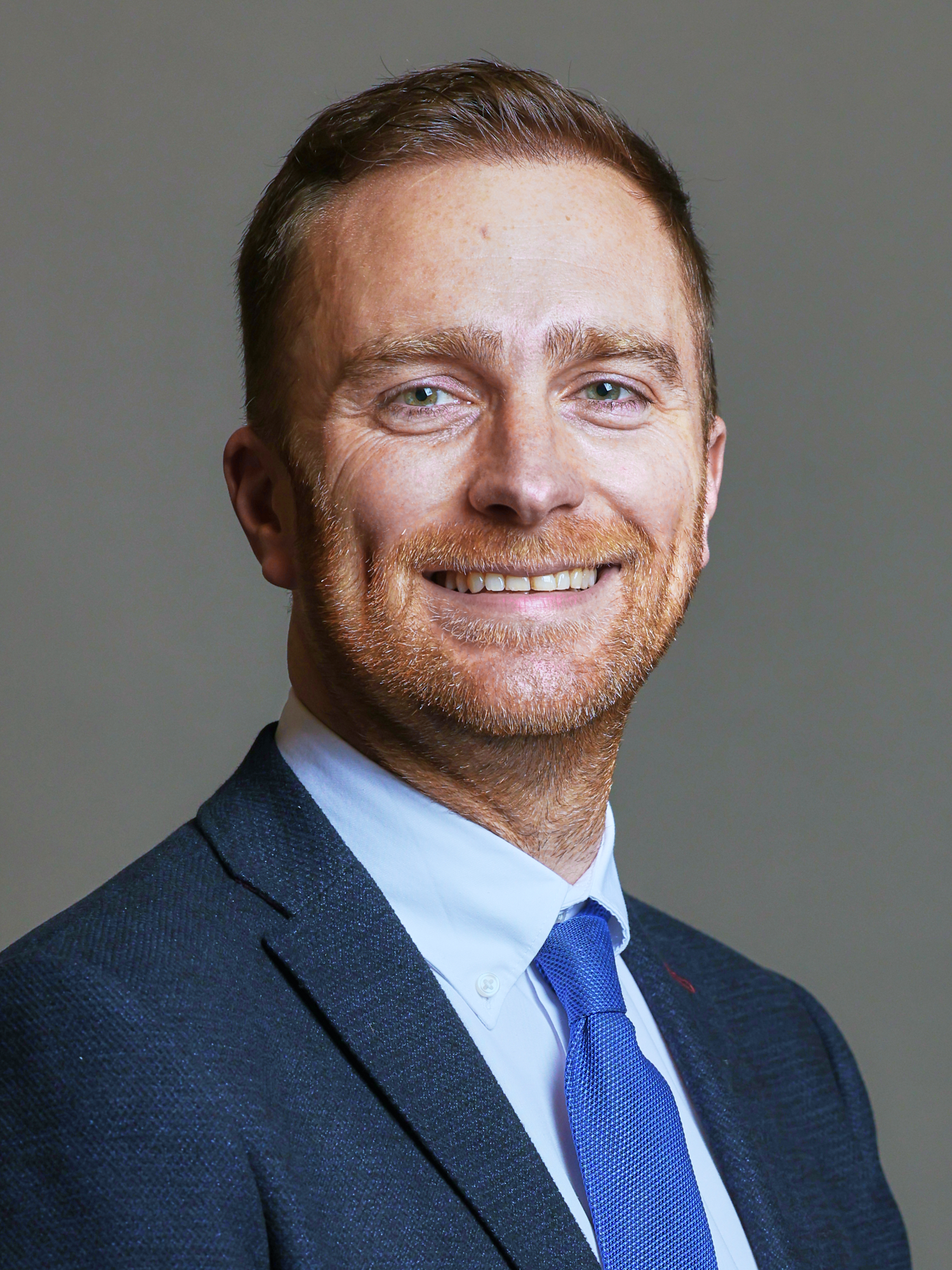
- Official portrait, 2021

Shadow Minister of State for Illegal Immigration, Crime, Policing and Fire
- Incumbent
- Assumed office 19 July 2024
- Leader: Rishi Sunak; Kemi Badenoch
- Preceded by: Alex Norris

Deputy Chairman of the Conservative Party
- Incumbent
- Assumed office 23 July 2025
- Leader: Kemi Badenoch
- In office 9 July 2022 – 19 August 2024
- Leader: Boris Johnson; Liz Truss; Rishi Sunak
- Succeeded by: Lee Anderson

Member of Parliament for Stockton West Stockton South (2019–2024)
- Incumbent
- Assumed office 12 December 2019
- Preceded by: Paul Williams
- Majority: 2,139 (4.4%)

Member of Stockton-on-Tees Borough Council for Hartburn
- In office May 2015 – April 2021 Serving with Lynn Hall
- Preceded by: Ken Lupton
- Succeeded by: Niall Innes

Personal details
- Born: 24 September 1983 (age 43) Stockton-on-Tees, County Durham, England
- Party: Conservative
- Education: Teesside University
- Website: mattvickers.co.uk

Matthew Alexander Vickers (born 24 September 1983) is a British Conservative politician who serves as the Member of Parliament (MP) for Stockton West, Deputy Chairman of the Conservative Party and Shadow Minister of State for Illegal Immigration, Crime, Policing and Fire.

Prior to the boundary changes, he had previously been the MP for Stockton South from 12 December 2019 to 30 May 2024.

== Early life ==
Vickers was born in the University Hospital of North Tees to Hilary and Alexander Vickers, a hairdresser and builder. He grew up in Stockton-on-Tees and has three brothers. He studied law and business management at Teesside University, and later studied at the University of Law. Vickers previously worked at Woolworths and Home Bargains including in a management role.

== Local political career ==
Vickers stood for election in the Norton West ward on the Stockton-on-Tees Borough Council in 2007 and 2011 losing to Labour Party candidates Ann and Dick Cains and David and Norma Wilburn respectively. In 2015 he stood for election in the Hartburn ward and became a councillor and leader of the Conservative group on the council from May 2015 until April 2021, when he stood down forcing a by-election.

Vickers stood as the Conservative candidate for Cleveland Police and Crime Commissioner in 2016 losing to Barry Coppinger after the second preference votes were counted with a 37.9% vote share.

After being elected an MP in 2019, Vickers remained as a councillor but donated his expenses to charity.

== Parliamentary career ==
=== In government: first term (2019–2024) ===
Vickers was elected as MP for Stockton South at the 2019 general election with a majority of 5,260. The seat had previously been held by Labour's Paul Williams. He has served on a number of House of Commons Select Committees, including the Levelling Up, Housing and Communities Committee, the Home Affairs Select Committee, the Justice Select Committee, the Petitions Committee and the Committee on the Future Relationship with the European Union Committee.

In June 2022, Vickers was appointed Parliamentary Private Secretary to the Home Office ministerial team, alongside Luke Evans. A month later, he was promoted to Deputy Chairman of the Conservative Party, serving in the role until 2024. Following the 2024 General Election, Vickers was appointed Shadow Shadow Minister of State for Crime, Policing and Fire.

In Parliament, Matt Vickers has served as the Chair of the All-Party Parliamentary Group (APPG) on Retail. In 2023, Vickers led a campaign with the backing of over 39 other MPs to ask the Chancellor Jeremy Hunt to extend 75% Business Rates Relief for retail, hospitality and leisure businesses.

Vickers has campaigned for the protection of hedgehogs.

Vickers has campaigned on protection for shop workers and retail staff from assault, including campaigning to make assaulting a retail worker to be made a standalone criminal offence.

On 19 November 2020, Vickers backed the home secretary, Priti Patel, after a Cabinet Office inquiry found evidence that Patel had breached the ministerial code following bullying allegations, publicly supporting Patel: "[Patel] is one of the most hardworking Home Secretaries this country has had."

On 27 September 2021, Vickers wrote a letter to the House of Commons director of catering requesting that the Teesside dish the chicken Parmo be added to the menu. After a successful campaign, the Parmo was added to the menu for a short period of time.

In June 2022, during the vote of no confidence in the Conservative Party leadership of Boris Johnson, Vickers publicly supported Johnson.

Vickers led a debate in the House of Commons for tougher measures against off-road bikes and other anti-social behaviour in Stockton in July 2023 and continues to advocate for cooperation between local police and his constituents.

=== In opposition: 2nd term (2024– ) ===
In the 2024 general election, he was elected for Stockton West as the only Conservative MP in North East England.

In August 2024, Vickers resigned as deputy chairman of the Conservative party in order to back Robert Jenrick in the 2024 Conservative Party leadership election. Vickers backed Rishi Sunak in the previous two Conservative leadership elections in 2022.

Following the 2024 Conservative Party leadership election, Vickers was appointed as Shadow Minister of State for Crime, Policing and Fire. In April 2025, Vickers gained the additional role of Shadow Minister of State for Illegal Immigration. In Kemi Badenoch's 2025 British shadow cabinet reshuffle, Vickers was promoted to the role of Deputy Chairman of the Conservative Party, whilst retaining his previous shadow ministerial responsibilities.

In January 2025, Vickers made a post on Facebook listing the Stockon Labour councillors who voted against a Conservative motion about grooming gangs. The Stockton Conservate Party then put out a series of paid Facebook adverts with the same names. Councillors then reported receiving online and verbal abuse and one person reported people hammering at the door of their home. Stockton North MP Chris McDonald criticised Vickers for his post in the House of Commons, while Redcar MP Anna Turley lodged a parliamentary complaint claiming that Vickers had endangered his constituents.

In June 2026, Vickers faced criticism following an appearance on TalkTV's Jeremy Kyle Show, during which he was reported to have laughed during a discussion of arson attacks targeting properties linked to Prime Minister Keir Starmer. During the segment, presenter Jeremy Kyle referenced conspiracy claims about the attacks and made remarks described by critics as homophobic; Vickers was accused of failing to challenge the comments and appearing to laugh along. The exchange prompted condemnation from political opponents, including Deputy Prime Minister David Lammy, who said Vickers had been "laughing and joking about the arson attack" and had "laughed along to demeaning, homophobic remarks". Labour Party figures subsequently called for Vickers to resign or be dismissed from his role as Deputy Chairman of the Conservative Party, with party chair Anna Turley stating that he was "not fit to be an MP" and urging Conservative leader Kemi Badenoch to sack him. Conservative representatives defended Vickers, stating that his reaction during the interview had been an attempt to remain polite to the host rather than an endorsement of the comments.

== Electoral history ==
General election 2019: Stockton South
Party	Candidate	Votes	%	±%
Conservative	Matt Vickers	27,764	50.7	+3.9
Labour	Paul Williams	22,504	41.1	−7.4
Liberal Democrats	Brendan Devlin	2,338	4.3	+2.5
Brexit Party	John Prescott	2,196	4.0	New
Majority		5,260	9.6	N/A
Turnout		54,802	71.3	+0.1
Conservative gain from Labour		Swing	+5.6	

General election 2024: Stockton West
Party	Candidate	Votes	%	±%
Conservative	Matt Vickers	20,372	41.9	−14.6
Labour	Joe Dancey	18,233	37.5	+3.6
Reform	Stephen Matthews	6,833	14.0	+9.3
Green	Anna-Maria Toms	1,477	3.0	+2.5
Liberal Democrats	Nigel Boddy	1,203	2.5	−1.9
Independent	Mohammed Zaroof	263	0.5	N/A
Independent	Vivek Chhabra	108	0.2	N/A
Independent	Niko Omilana	106	0.2	N/A
Independents for Direct Democracy	Monty Brack	45	0.1	N/A
Majority		2,139	4.4	
Turnout		48,640	69.8	
Conservative hold		Swing	-9.1%	

Parliament of the United Kingdom
Preceded by Paul Williams	Member of Parliament for Stockton South; 2019–2024	Constituency abolished
New constituency	Member of Parliament for Stockton West; 2024–present	Incumbent
Party political offices
Preceded by Justin Tomlinson	Deputy Chairman of the Conservative Party; 2022–2023	Succeeded by Lee Anderson
Preceded by Rachel Maclean	Vice Chairman of the Conservative Party; 2023–2024	Incumbent
