= History of parliamentary constituencies and boundaries in Cleveland =

History of political boundaries in part of northern England

The non-metropolitan county of Cleveland was created under the Local Government Act 1972, which came into effect on 1 April 1974, comprising the urban areas around the mouth of the River Tees, previously parts of the administrative counties of Durham and North Riding of Yorkshire. Cleveland was abolished in 1996 both as a county council and a non-metropolitan county, being succeeded by the unitary authorities of Hartlepool, Middlesbrough, Redcar and Cleveland, and Stockton-on-Tees. The constituency boundaries used up to the 2005 United Kingdom general election were drawn up when the county still existed. For the review which came into effect for the 2010 general election, the four authorities were considered separately, with Middlesbrough and Redcar and Cleveland being combined.

For the 2023 Periodic Review of Westminster constituencies, coming into effect for the 2024 United Kingdom general election, the Boundary Commission for England considered the area comprising the Tees Valley Combined Authority, which also comprises the unitary authority of Darlington, as a sub-region of the North East Region. For the purposes of this series of articles, the constituency of Darlington continues to be included in History of parliamentary constituencies and boundaries in Durham.

The area has returned 6 MPs to the UK Parliament since 1983.

== Constituencies timeline ==
County seat Borough seat

Constituencies	1974-1983	1983-1997	1997-2024	2024-present
Hartlepool	←present			
Stockton^{1}	←1983			
Stockton North		1983-2024		2024-present
Thornaby^{1}	←1983			
Stockton South		1983-2024		
Stockton West				2024-present
Middlesbrough^{1}	←2024			
Middlesbrough and Thornaby East				2024-present
Redcar^{1}	←present			
Cleveland and Whitby	←1983			
Langbaurgh		1983-1997		
Middlesbrough South and East Cleveland			1997-present	

^{1} From 1974 to 1983, these constituencies were formally named as sub-divisions of the County Borough of Teesside.

== Boundary reviews ==
=== 1974 ===
At the time of its creation, Cleveland contained the equivalent of approximately 6 constituencies: four boroughs contained within the County Borough of Teesside, namely Stockton, Thornaby, Middlesbrough and Redcar; Hartlepool in the county of Durham; and the majority of Cleveland and Whitby in the North Riding of Yorkshire. It also contained small areas of Easington and Richmond (Yorks).

=== 1983 ===
The next change to parliamentary constituency boundaries, following the recommendations of the Third Periodic Review of Westminster constituencies, reflected the change in county boundaries and reorganisation of local government authorities in 1974. The review did not come into effect for a further nine years, at the 1983 general election.

The new constituency of Stockton North comprised the majority of the abolished Stockton constituency, including Billingham, Norton and the town centre of Stockton-on-Tees. The new constituency of Stockton South was based on the abolished constituency of Thornaby and included Thornaby-on-Tees and three wards in the borough of Middlesbrough. It also included parts of the old Stockton seat, parts transferred from Easington in Durham (Egglescliffe) and parts transferred from Richmond (Yorks) (Ingleby Barwick and Yarm). Middlesbrough gained some areas of the old Thornaby seat, including Acklam and Linthorpe, but lost southern areas, including Marton, to Langbaurgh. This new constituency was based on the “Cleveland” part of the abolished Cleveland and Whitby, with Whitby and surrounding rural areas being transferred to Scarborough in North Yorkshire.

There were only minor changes to Hartlepool and Redcar was unchanged.

=== 1997 ===
Under the Fourth Periodic Review, the three Middlesbrough borough wards (Ayresome, Brockfield and Kader) in Stockton South were transferred to the Middlesbrough constituency.

Markse-by-the-Sea was transferred to Redcar from Langbaurgh, which was renamed Middlesbrough South and East Cleveland.

=== 2010 ===
At the Fifth Review there were only minor changes due to the revision of local authority ward boundaries.

=== 2024 ===
For the 2023 Periodic Review of Westminster constituencies, which redrew the constituency map ahead of the 2024 United Kingdom general election, the Boundary Commission for England opted to treat the area comprising the Tees Valley Combined Authority, which includes the unitary authority of Darlington, as a sub-region of the North East Region.

Two Stockton Borough wards (Mandale & Victoria and Stainsby Hill) were transferred from Stockton South (renamed Stockton West) to Middlesbrough (renamed Middlesbrough and Thornaby East). Stockton West included some rural areas of the Borough of Darlington (previously part of the abolished constituency of Sedgefield). Saltburn-by-the-Sea was transferred from Middlesbrough South and East Cleveland to Redcar. Other minor changes to take account of revised ward boundaries.

== Maps ==
1974-1983

1983-1997

2010-2024
2024-present

== Communities timeline ==
The table below shows which constituencies represented selected communities within the current county from 1885 onwards.

Community		1885-1918	1918-1950	1950-1974	1974-1983	1983-1997	1997-2024	2024-present
Billingham		South East Durham	Sedgefield		Teesside, Stockton	Stockton North		
Egglescliffe		South East Durham	Sedgefield		Easington	Stockton South		Stockton West
Eston		Cleveland			Teesside, Redcar	Redcar		
Greatham		South East Durham	Sedgefield		Easington	Hartlepool		
Guisborough		Cleveland			Cleveland and Whitby	Langbaurgh	Middlesbrough South and East Cleveland	
Hartlepool (incorporatingWest Hartlepool)		The Hartlepools			Hartlepool			
Ingleby Barwick		Cleveland		Richmond		Stockton South		Stockton West
Loftus		Cleveland			Cleveland and Whitby	Langbaurgh	Middlesbrough South and East Cleveland	
Norton		Stockton-on-Tees			Teesside, Stockton	Stockton North		
Marske-by-the-Sea		Cleveland			Cleveland and Whitby	Langbaurgh	Redcar	
Middlesbrough	Acklam	Cleveland		Middlesbrough West	Teesside, Thornaby	Middlesbrough		Middlesbrough and Thornaby East
Middlesbrough	Ayresome	Middlesbrough	Middlesbrough West		Teesside, Thornaby	Stockton South	Middlesbrough	Middlesbrough and Thornaby East
Middlesbrough	Linthorpe	Cleveland	Middlesbrough West		Teesside, Thornaby	Middlesbrough		Middlesbrough and Thornaby East
Middlesbrough	Marton	Cleveland		Richmond	Teesside, Middlesbrough	Langbaurgh	Middlesbrough South and East Cleveland	
Middlesbrough	Newport	Middlesbrough	Middlesbrough West	Middlesbrough East	Teesside, Thornaby	Middlesbrough		Middlesbrough and Thornaby East
Middlesbrough	North Ormesby	Middlesbrough	Middlesbrough East		Teesside, Middlesbrough	Middlesbrough		Middlesbrough and Thornaby East
Middlesbrough	Town centre	Middlesbrough	Middlesbrough East		Teesside, Middlesbrough	Middlesbrough		Middlesbrough and Thornaby East
Ormesby		Cleveland		Richmond	Teesside, Redcar	Redcar		
Redcar		Cleveland			Teesside, Redcar	Redcar		
Saltburn-by-the-Sea		Cleveland			Cleveland and Whitby	Langbaurgh	Middlesbrough South and East Cleveland	Redcar
Skelton and Brotton		Cleveland			Cleveland and Whitby	Langbaurgh	Middlesbrough South and East Cleveland	
Stockton-on-Tees		Stockton-on-Tees			Teesside, Stockton	Stockton North		
Thornaby-on-Tees (town centre)		Stockton-on-Tees		Middlesbrough West	Teesside, Thornaby	Stockton South		Middlesbrough and Thornaby East
Yarm		Cleveland	Richmond			Stockton South		Stockton West
Community		1885-1918	1918-1950	1950-1974	1974-1983	1983-1997	1997-2024	2024-present

== See also ==
- List of parliamentary constituencies in Cleveland
- History of parliamentary constituencies and boundaries in Durham
