= Alex Norris (British politician) =

British politician (born 1984)

The Right Honourable Alex Norris MP
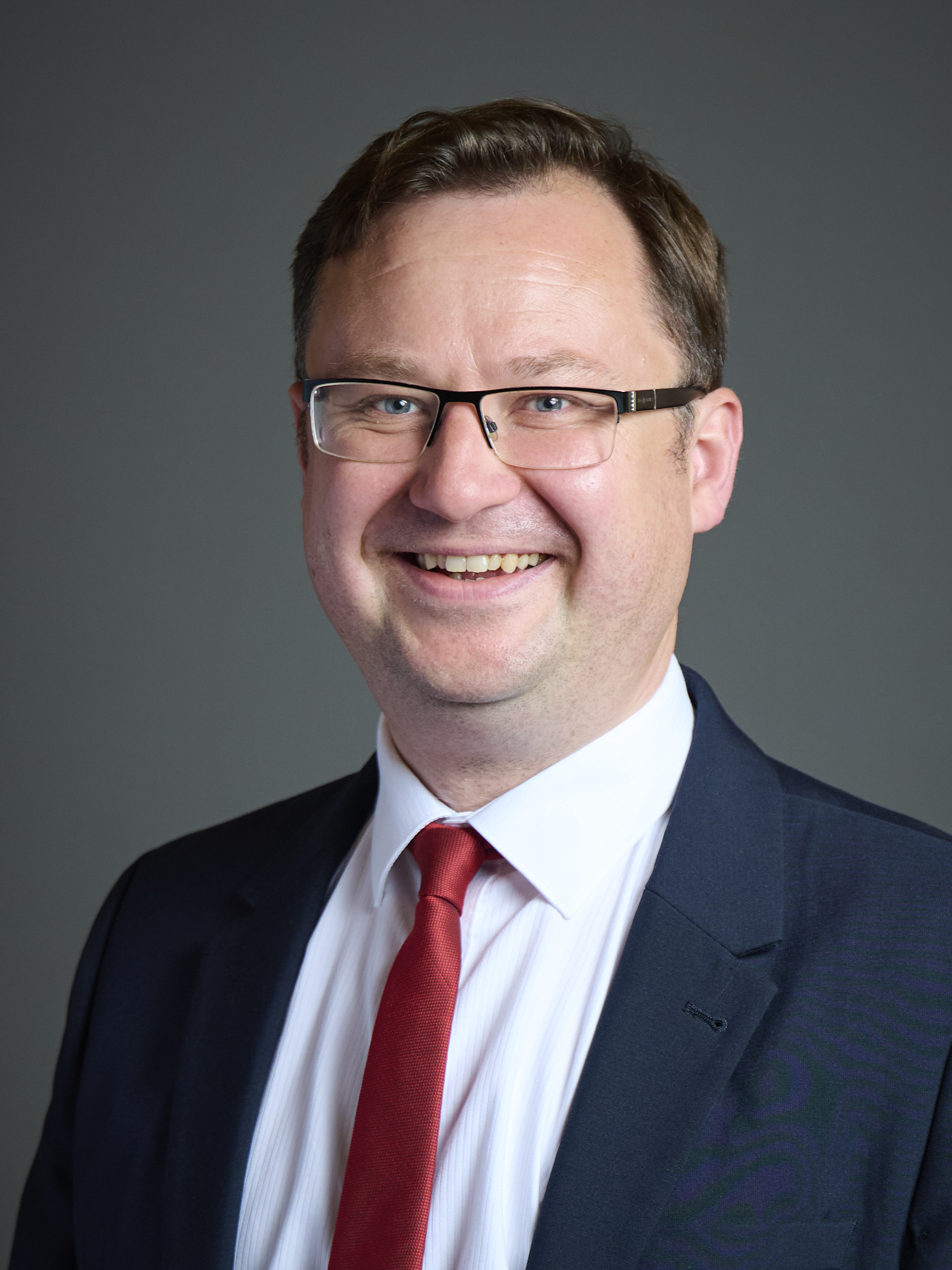
- Official portrait, 2024

Secretary of State for Justice Lord Chancellor
- Incumbent
- Assumed office 20 July 2026
- Prime Minister: Andy Burnham
- Preceded by: David Lammy
Junior ministerial offices
Minister of State for Border Security and Asylum
In office 6 September 2025 – 20 July 2026
Prime Minister	Keir Starmer
Preceded by	Angela Eagle
Succeeded by	Anna Turley
Parliamentary Under-Secretary of State for Building Safety, Fire and Local Growth
In office 9 July 2024 – 6 September 2025
Prime Minister	Keir Starmer
Preceded by	Jacob Young
Succeeded by	Samantha Dixon
Shadow portfolios
Shadow Minister for Policing
In office 5 September 2023 – 5 July 2024
Leader	Keir Starmer
Preceded by	Sarah Jones
Succeeded by	Matt Vickers
Shadow Minister for Levelling Up
In office 4 December 2021 – 5 September 2023
Leader	Keir Starmer
Preceded by	Position Established
Succeeded by	Justin Madders
Shadow Minister for Public Health and Patient Safety
In office 9 April 2020 – 4 December 2021
Leader	Keir Starmer
Preceded by	Sharon Hodgson
Succeeded by	Andrew Gwynne

Member of Parliament for Nottingham North and Kimberley Nottingham North (2017–2024)
- Incumbent
- Assumed office 8 June 2017
- Preceded by: Graham Allen
- Majority: 9,427 (26.9%)

Personal details
- Born: Alexander James Jordan Norris; 4 February 1984 (age 42) Manchester, England
- Party: Labour Co-op
- Spouse: Emma Foody (m. 2017)
- Education: University of Nottingham (BA)
- Website: alexnorrismp.co.uk

Alexander James Jordan Norris (born 4 February 1984) is a British politician who has served as Secretary of State for Justice and Lord Chancellor since July 2026. A member of the Labour and Co-operative Party, he has been the Member of Parliament for Nottingham North and Kimberley, formerly Nottingham North, since 2017.

== Early life and career ==
Alexander James Jordan Norris was born on 4 February 1984 in Altrincham. He and his sister Catherine were raised by his mother, Carole, after his father died of cancer when Norris was two. At the age of eleven, Norris received a free place to study at the private Manchester Grammar School. He moved to Nottingham in 2003 to study Politics and History at the University of Nottingham.

Norris served as a member of Nottingham City Council, for Basford ward for six years and served as Portfolio Holder for Adults and Health. Before being elected to Parliament in 2017, Norris was working for UNISON as an Area Organiser.

== Parliamentary career ==
At the snap 2017 general election, Norris was elected to Parliament as MP for Nottingham North with 60.2% of the vote and a majority of 11,160. From 2017, Norris served as Parliamentary Private Secretary to Shadow Health Secretary Jonathan Ashworth until February 2019.

He served as an Opposition Whip from February 2019 until his appointment as Shadow Minister for Prevention, Public Health and Primary Care in Keir Starmer's first opposition frontbench. On 5 March 2019, Norris was appointed as acting Shadow Minister for the Department for International Development.

At the 2019 general election, Norris was re-elected as MP for Nottingham North with a decreased vote share of 49.1% and a decreased majority of 4,490. Norris nominated Lisa Nandy in the 2020 Labour Party leadership election.

In the November 2021 British shadow cabinet reshuffle, he became Shadow Minister for Levelling Up, assisting Lisa Nandy. In the 2023 British shadow cabinet reshuffle, he became Shadow Minister for Policing.

Owing to the 2023 review of Westminster constituencies, Norris's constituency of Nottingham North was abolished, and replaced with Nottingham North and Kimberley. At the 2024 general election, Norris was elected to Parliament as MP for Nottingham North and Kimberley with 47.1% of the vote and a majority of 9,427. He was appointed Parliamentary Under-Secretary of State for Building Safety, Fire and Local Growth on 9 July 2024.

In Keir Starmer's 2025 British cabinet reshuffle, he was promoted to Minister of State for Border Security and Asylum. On 20 July 2026, Norris was appointed to Cabinet as Secretary of State for Justice and Lord Chancellor under Andy Burnham.

== Personal life ==
His wife Emma Foody was elected to Parliament as MP for Cramlington and Killingworth at the 2024 general election.

== Honours ==
On 21 July 2026, Norris was sworn into the Privy Council, entitling him to be styled with the honorific title "The Right Honourable" for life.

Parliament of the United Kingdom
Preceded by Graham Allen	Member of Parliament for Nottingham North; 2017–2024	Constituency abolished
New constituency	Member of Parliament for Nottingham North and Kimberley; 2024–present	Incumbent
Political offices
Preceded by Sharon Hodgson	Shadow Minister for Public Health and Patient Safety; 2020-2021	Succeeded by Andrew Gwynne
New title	Shadow Minister for Levelling Up; 2021-2023	Succeeded by Justin Madders
Preceded by Sarah Jones	Shadow Minister for Policing; 2023-2024	Succeeded by Matt Vickers
Preceded by Jacob Young	Parliamentary Under-Secretary of State for Building Safety, Fire and Resilience; 2024-2025	Succeeded by Samantha Dixon
Preceded by Angela Eagle	Minister of State for Border Security and Asylum; 2025-2026	Succeeded by Anna Turley
Government offices
Preceded by David Lammy	Secretary of State for Justice; 2026-present	Incumbent
Preceded by David Lammy	Lord Chancellor; 2026-present	Incumbent
