= Parliamentary Under-Secretary of State for Building Safety, Fire and Resilience =

United Kingdom Parliamentary Under-Secretary of State for Building Safety, Fire and Resilience
- Royal Arms of His Majesty's Government

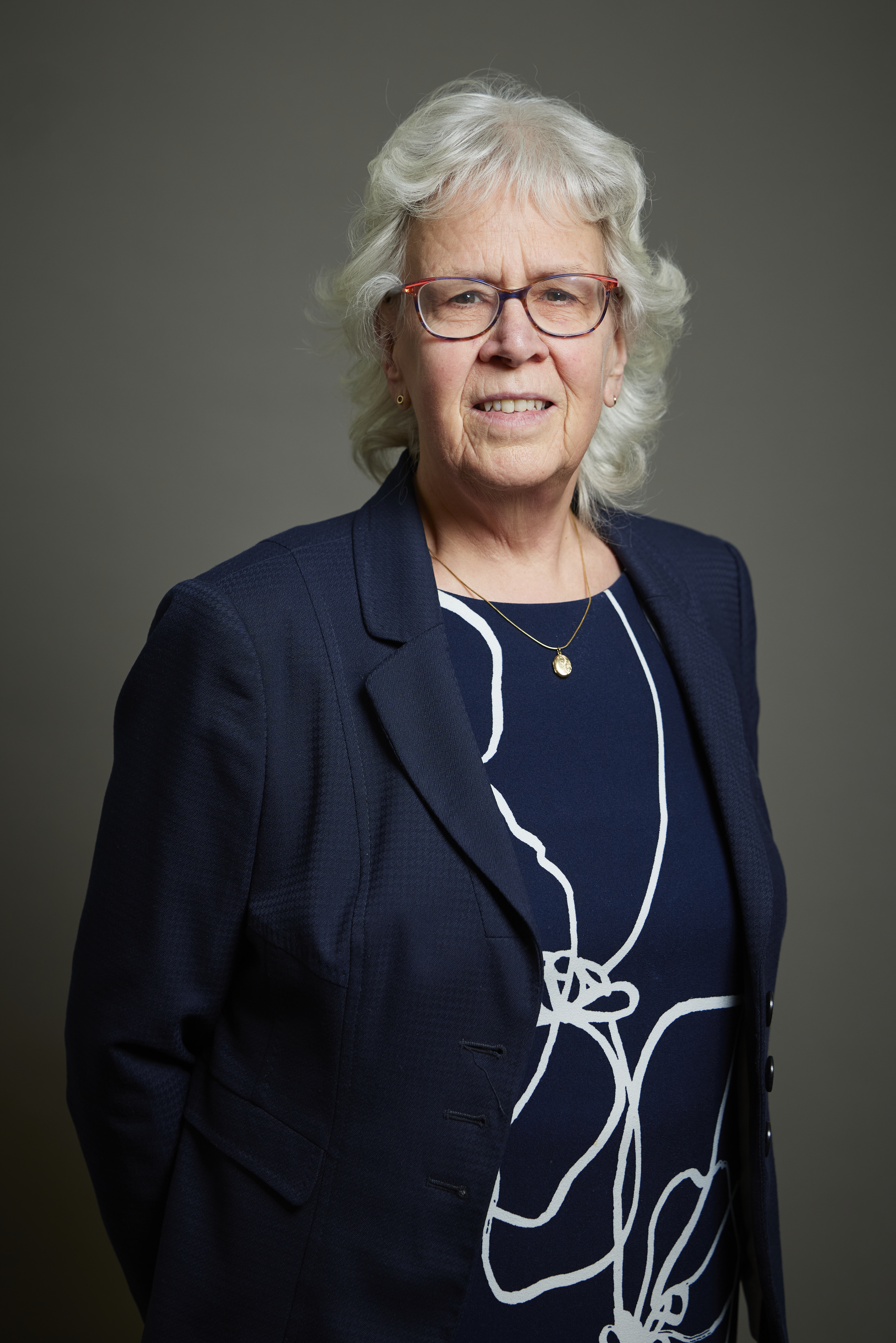
- Incumbent; Judith Blake, Baroness Blake of Leeds since 22 July 2026
- Ministry of Housing, Communities and Local Government
- Nominator: Prime Minister
- Appointer: The Monarch; on advice of the Prime Minister
- Term length: At His Majesty's pleasure

The Parliamentary Under-Secretary of State for Building Safety, Fire and Resilience is a junior position in the Ministry of Housing, Communities and Local Government, part of the UK Government.

== Ministers ==
Name	Portrait	Entered office	Left office	Political party	Prime Minister
Minister of State for Building Safety and Fire
Stephen Greenhalgh, Baron Greenhalgh		18 March 2020	8 July 2022	Conservative	Johnson
Minister of State for Local Government and Building Safety
Paul Scully		8 July 2022	27 October 2022	Conservative	Johnson
Paul Scully		8 July 2022	27 October 2022	Conservative	Truss
Parliamentary Under-Secretary of State for Local Government and Building Safety
Lee Rowley		27 October 2022	13 November 2023	Conservative	Sunak
Minister of State for Housing, Planning and Building Safety
Lee Rowley		13 November 2023	5 July 2024	Conservative	Sunak
Parliamentary Under-Secretary of State for Building Safety, Fire and Local Growth
Alex Norris		9 July 2024	6 September 2025	Labour	Keir Starmer
Samantha Dixon		6 September 2025	22 July 2026	Labour	Keir Starmer
Parliamentary Under-Secretary of State for Building Safety, Fire and Resilience
Judith Blake, Baroness Blake of Leeds		22 July 2026	Incumbent	Labour	Andy Burnham
