= Ian Swales =

British Liberal Democrat politician

Parliamentary Private Secretary to the Secretary of State for Business, Innovation and Skills
- In office 28 January 2015 – 11 May 2015
- Prime Minister: David Cameron
- Preceded by: Tessa Munt
- Succeeded by: John Glen

Member of Parliament for Redcar
- In office 6 May 2010 – 30 March 2015
- Preceded by: Vera Baird
- Succeeded by: Anna Turley

Personal details
- Born: 5 April 1953 (age 73) Leeds, West Riding of Yorkshire, England
- Party: Liberal Democrats
- Spouse: Pat Swales
- Children: 3
- Education: UMIST

Ian Cameron Swales (born 5 April 1953) is a British Liberal Democrat politician. He was the Member of Parliament for the constituency of Redcar in England. He is the only person ever to gain a North East Region Commons seat for the Liberal Democrats. Swales took Redcar from Labour incumbent Vera Baird for the Liberal Democrats at the 2010 general election, with a 21.8% swing adding over 11,000 votes to his 2005 general election total. This was the biggest swing against any Labour candidate in the election and was also the biggest majority overcome by any Liberal Democrat, until the 2022 Tiverton and Honiton by-election. He stood down at the 2015 general election.

== Early life ==
Ian Swales is the son of Harry Swales and Elizabeth Adamson Doig. His Scottish mother was a first cousin of Peter Doig, Labour MP for Dundee West from 1963 to 1979. His grandfather Andrew Doig encouraged fellow Lochgelly coal miner Joe Corrie in his writing. Corrie became a celebrated working class poet and playwright. He dedicated his first book of poems to Doig and his widow left the Corrie archive to Doig's descendants.

Swales was born in Leeds and grew up in Harrogate; his mother died when he was eight years old. Educated at Woodlands Junior School, he became Head Boy and then won a County Council funded scholarship to Ashville College, Harrogate. Following a chemical engineering degree at University of Manchester Institute of Science and Technology, where he met his wife, Pat, a Durham miner's daughter, he joined Yorkshire Electricity and qualified as an accountant in 1977. He moved to Teesside in 1978 to join large chemical company ICI and settled in Redcar. From 1983 to 1986, he worked for ICI in Brussels.

== Political career ==
Swales joined the SDP when it was founded in 1981, and was a member of the first SDP Cleveland County Committee. He contested the 2005 general election in the Redcar Constituency and moved the Liberal Democrats (the successor party to the SDP) from third to second place with a positive swing against both the Labour and Conservative parties.

In 2010, Swales achieved a 21.8% swing against Labour in winning the Redcar seat. He made his maiden speech in Parliament on 7 June 2010. For his role in helping to get Redcar steel works restarted Swales was Total Politics MP of the month for April 2011 and Dods constituency MP of the year finalist for 2011. During his time in Parliament, Swales was an active member of many All Party Parliamentary Groups including Chair of the APPG for the Chemical Industry and Vice-Chair of the APPGs for Steel and Energy Intensive Industries. In May 2014, Swales was appointed to the taskforce group for electrification of rail in the north by the Secretary of State for Transport, Patrick McLoughlin, MP.

Shortly after the 2010 election, Swales became an active member of the Public Accounts Committee, which sits twice a week and scrutinises all public expenditure. In June 2014, Swales resigned from the Committee, citing frontbench commitments. He also sat on the Welfare Reform and Finance Bill Committees, and campaigned against tax avoidance. After his prominent role on the Public Accounts Committee, Swales was promoted to Liberal Democrat Treasury Spokesman. He rebelled against the Conservative/Liberal Democrat government on university tuition fee increases, welfare issues including the "bedroom tax" and in August 2013 the proposal to take military action in Syria.

In July 2014, Swales announced that he was standing down as an MP at the 2015 general election, for "personal reasons". In January 2015, he was made Parliamentary Private Secretary to Vince Cable, the Secretary of State for Business, Innovation and Skills.

In October 2021, after the murder of David Amess, Swales revealed that he stood down partly because of a 2014 incident in which two men entered his constituency office claiming to know where he lived and threatening to kill him.

== After Parliament ==
Following his retirement from Parliament, Swales continued to participate in local industry issues. He advised the management of Redcar steel works and in August 2015 joined the Board, becoming Chair, of the Northeast of England Process Industry Cluster (NEPIC), the body that represents companies in the chemical, pharmaceutical, polymer, renewable energy and materials, steel and biotechnology process industries in North-East England. In 2015 he received an Honorary Fellowship from the Institute of Chemical Engineers (FIChemE) for his contributions to the chemical industry.

Swales was the founding Chair of mental health charity The Link Tees Valley Ltd. and remained as a Director until 2023. He was Chair of the grant giving charity the Woodsmith Foundation until 2026. He became a Director of Redcar Racecourse Limited in 2019 and Chair from 2026

== Personal life ==
Swales was a volunteer coach in Redcar Swimming Club and after the closure of the old pool campaigned for a new one. Swales was on the Committee of Coatham Memorial Hall for many years.

Swales is a humanist, and in 2015 was made an honorary life member of Humanists UK for his work in Parliament. He and his wife Pat have three children and seven grandchildren.

Parliament of the United Kingdom
Preceded by Vera Baird	Member of Parliament for Redcar; 2010–2015	Succeeded by Anna Turley
