= Anna Turley =

British politician (born 1978)

The Right Honourable Anna Turley MP
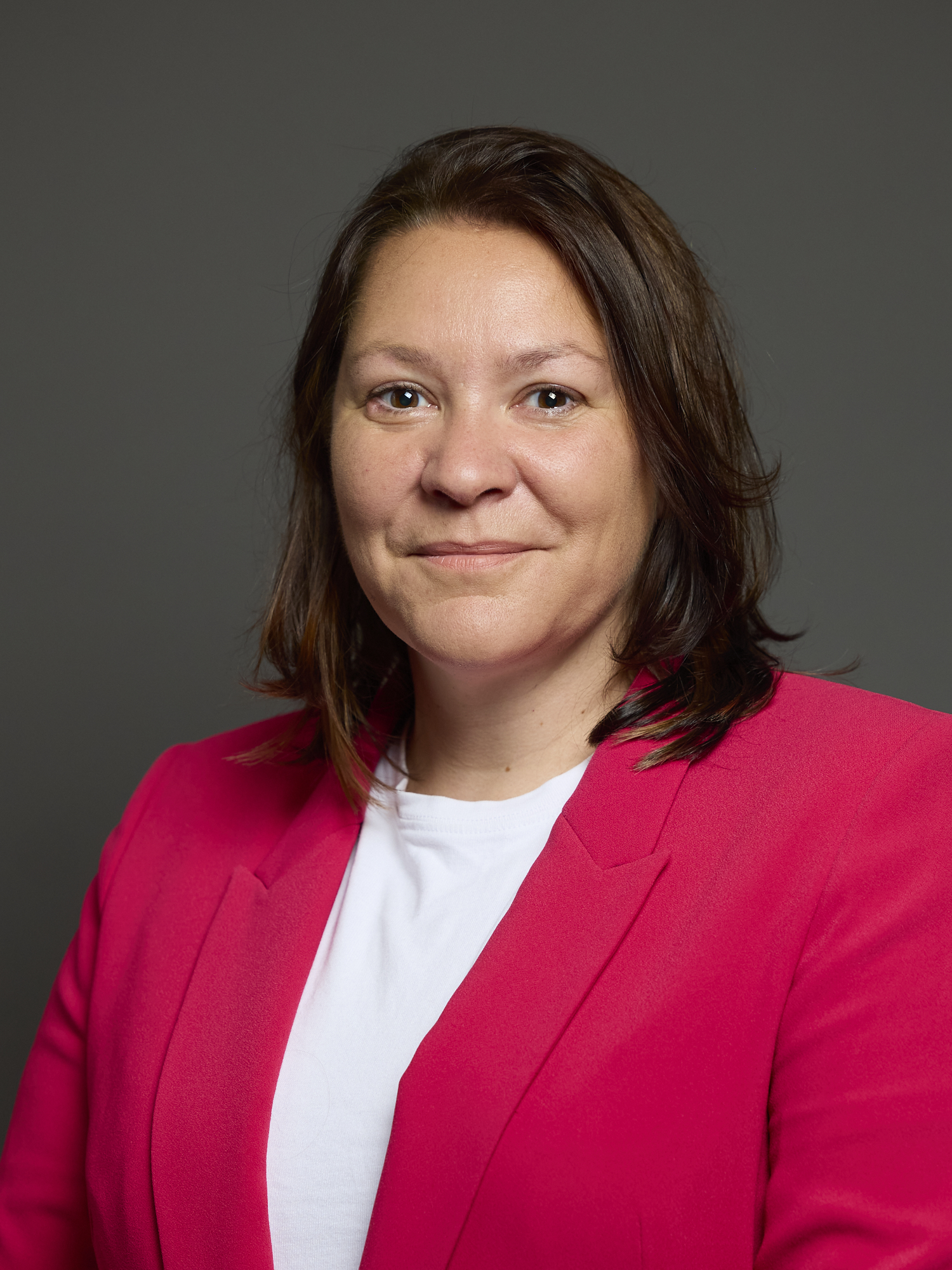
- Official portrait, 2024

Minister of State for Border Security and Asylum
- Incumbent
- Assumed office 21 July 2026
- Prime Minister: Andy Burnham
- Preceded by: Alex Norris

Minister without Portfolio Chair of the Labour Party
- In office 6 September 2025 – 21 July 2026
- Prime Minister: Keir Starmer
- Preceded by: Ellie Reeves
- Succeeded by: Bridget Phillipson (Chair)

Lord Commissioner of the Treasury
- In office 10 July 2024 – 6 September 2025
- Prime Minister: Keir Starmer

Member of Parliament for Redcar
- Incumbent
- Assumed office 4 July 2024
- Preceded by: Jacob Young
- Majority: 3,323 (8.7%)
- In office 7 May 2015 – 6 November 2019
- Preceded by: Ian Swales
- Succeeded by: Jacob Young

Chair of the Co-operative Party
- In office 8 June 2019 – 13 December 2019
- Preceded by: Gareth Thomas
- Succeeded by: Chris Herries

Personal details
- Born: Anna Catherine Turley; 9 October 1978 (age 47) Dartford, Kent, England
- Party: Labour Co-op
- Spouse: John Wilberforce (m. 2026)
- Education: Greyfriars, Oxford (BA)

Anna Catherine Turley (born 9 October 1978) is a British politician who has served as Minister of State for Border Security and Asylum since 2026. She previously served as Chair of the Labour Party and Minister without Portfolio from 2025 to 2026. A member of the Labour and Co-operative parties, she has been the Member of Parliament (MP) for Redcar since 2024, having previously served from 2015 to 2019.

Turley was elected as MP for Redcar at the 2015 general election, succeeding Ian Swales. Following Jeremy Corbyn's election as party leader in September 2015, she joined the frontbench as shadow civil society minister. She later became a critic of Corbyn and resigned from the role in 2016. Turley was reelected at the 2017 general election and became chair of the Cooperative party in June 2019. She then lost her seat to the Conservative Party at the 2019 general election. Outside Parliament, she worked as a sports consultant for Betting and Gaming Council and as associate director at Arden Strategies.

Turley returned to Parliament at the 2024 general election, and subsequently joined the government frontbench as a Lord Commissioner of the Treasury under Keir Starmer. In the 2025 cabinet reshuffle, she was promoted to cabinet as Chair of the Labour Party and Minister without Portfolio.

== Early life and education ==
Turley was born in Dartford, Kent, and was privately educated at the independent Ashford School. She went on to read History at Greyfriars, Oxford.

== Early career ==
From 2001 to 2005, Turley was a fast-stream civil servant at the Home Office, initially working on youth crime issues, and later moved to the Department for Work and Pensions, specialising in child poverty issues.

In 2007, Turley worked for public relations agency The Ledbury Group. In April 2008, she became deputy director of the local government research organisation the New Local Government Network, and in 2010 co-founded the Co-operative Councils Innovation Network designed to enable local authorities to work in partnership with local communities.

In 2011, Turley founded a consultancy and online forum ProgLoc (Progressive Localism) for progressive debate of key issues affecting local government, and became an associate researcher for the NGO Future of London. In 2013, Turley became a senior research fellow at IPPR North.

== Political career (2005–2013) ==
In 2005, Turley became a special adviser in the Department for Work and Pensions under David Blunkett, then in 2006 for the Cabinet Office under Hilary Armstrong.

In the 2006 Wandsworth London Borough Council election, Turley stood unsuccessfully as a Labour candidate for Wandsworth Common ward.

Turley was shortlisted for the North West Durham seat for the 2010 general election but lost out to Pat Glass. In 2012 Turley was listed as a speaker for the New Labour pressure group Progress.

In 2013, Turley was selected to stand in the Redcar constituency from an all-women shortlist, in a contentious selection process that was ultimately associated with the resignation of ten Labour councillors.

== First parliamentary career (2015–2019) ==
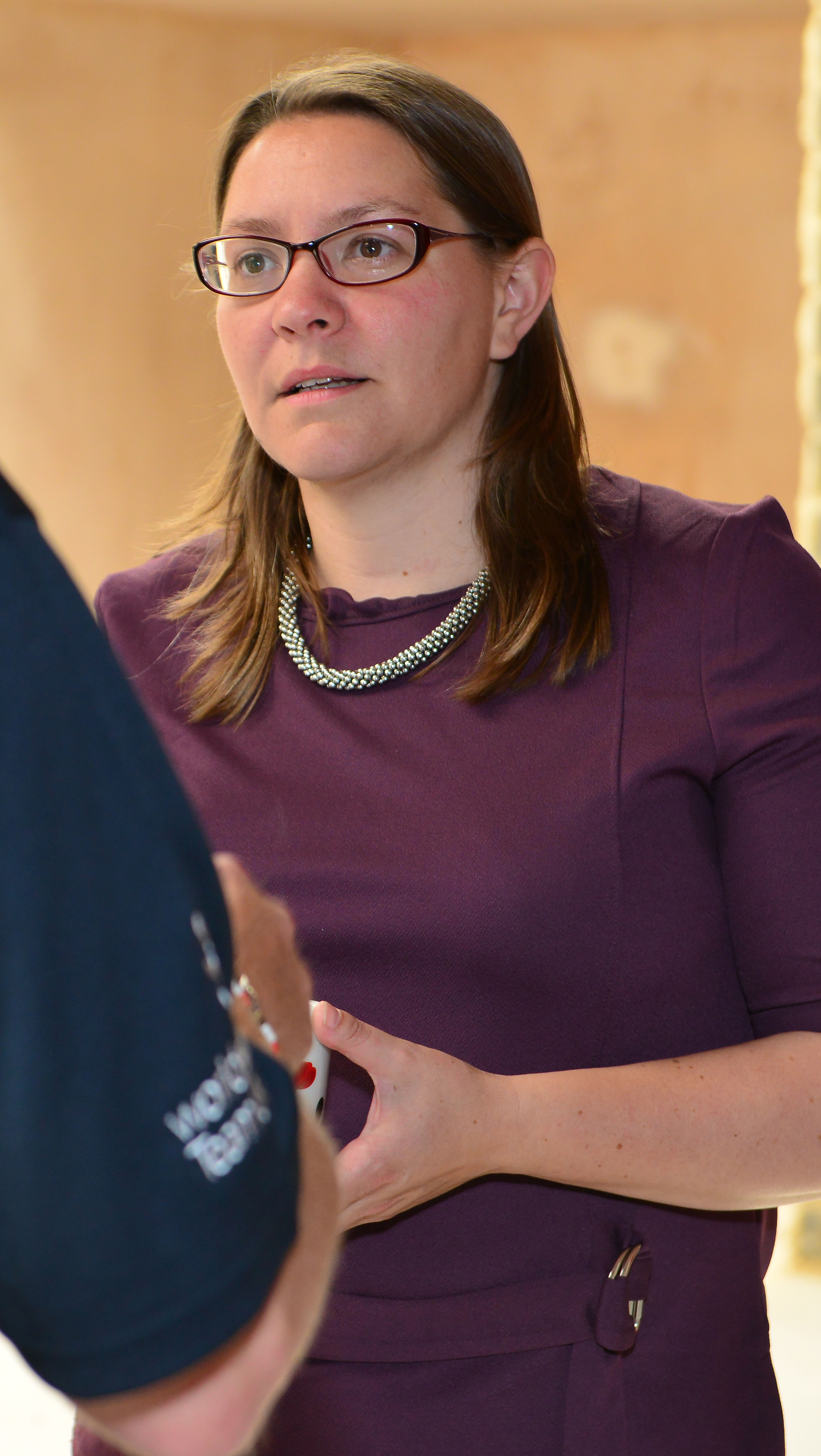
Turley in 2015

=== First term ===
Turley became the member of parliament for Redcar at the May 2015 general election, winning the seat from the Liberal Democrats. She was appointed as a member of the Home Affairs Select Committee in July 2015, and later the Business, Energy and Industrial Strategy Committee.

Soon after becoming an MP, Turley had to respond to major local employer SSI UK, which operated Teesside Steelworks, going into liquidation, leading to about 3,000 local job losses. The steelworks had once employed about 40,000. Turley set up a local SSI Taskforce, and secured £50 million from the government to help support retraining and new jobs.

She supported Andy Burnham in the 2015 leadership election. In September 2015, the newly elected Labour leader Jeremy Corbyn appointed Turley as shadow civil society minister in his first shadow cabinet. Turley was a critic of Corbyn, and resigned as a Shadow Minister in June 2016. In the 2016 leadership election campaign soon afterwards, Turley stated that Corbyn was "completely out of touch with reality", and supported Owen Smith for leader. She would later argue that Labour had "moved too far to the left" and had "issues around national security as well as with antisemitism".

In 2016, Turley introduced a private member's bill to increase the maximum sentences available to the courts for specified offences related to animal cruelty to five years. She queued from 2am until 10am to table the bill. The Animal Welfare (Sentencing) Act was passed in April 2021, and came into force on 29 June 2021.

=== Second term ===
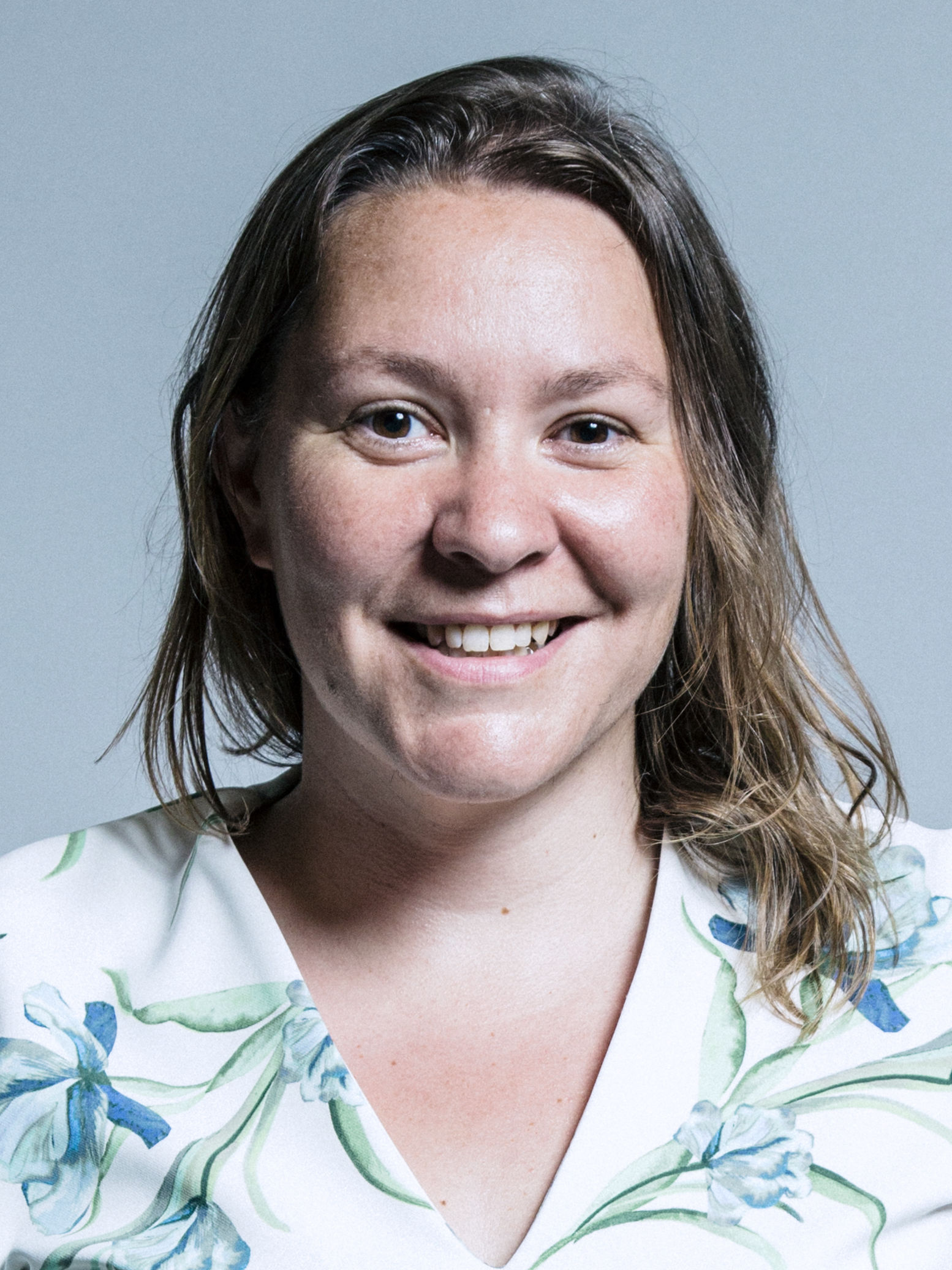
Official portrait, 2017

In the 2017 general election, Turley was re-elected with 23,623 votes, a share of 55.5%. She became chair of the All-Party Parliamentary Groups ("APPGs") on Hydrogen and Bingo, Secretary of the APPG on Steel and Metal Related Industry and a member of the APPGs on Endometriosis, Speedway, Loan Charge, Carbon Capture and Storage, Performers Alliance, Music, Equitable Life, Fair Business Banking and the All-Party Parliamentary Dog Advisory Welfare Group. She is also a member of various Labour Party groups, including the Labour Movement for Europe, LGBT Labour, Jewish Labour Movement, Labour Campaign for International Development, Labour Friends of Israel and Labour Party Irish Society.

In 2018, Turley worked with the charity, Family Rights Group, to establish the cross party Parliamentary Taskforce on Kinship Care, to campaign for improvements to support for children raised by relatives and friends when they cannot remain with their parents. Turley later completed the 2023 Great North Run for Family Rights Group.

She served as chair of the Co-operative Party from 8 June 2019 until December 2019. She was Chair of the Labour Movement for Europe from 2018 to 2020.

In the 2019 general election, Turley lost her seat to the Conservative candidate. She blamed party leader Jeremy Corbyn for the loss. Turley had been re-elected at the 2017 general election under Jeremy Corbyn. In December 2019, the Conservative party defeated Turley's 9,485 majority, taking the seat for the first time.

== Outside Parliament (2019–2024) ==
On 19 December 2019, following a six-day trial at the Royal Courts of Justice, Turley won a libel claim against Unite the Union and Stephen Walker (editor of The Skwawkbox); the court upheld that her reputation had been damaged by Walker and Unite during the election.

During the COVID-19 pandemic, Turley helped run the local foodbank, and set up a charity to distribute books to disadvantaged children. She is a School Governor for Whale Hill Primary School in Eston. From May 2022 to July 2023, she served as chair of the North East Child Poverty Commission (NECPC), an organisation campaigning to end child poverty in the North East.

She worked as a sports consultant for the Betting and Gaming Council, an organisation which represents the gambling industry, and in April 2021 wrote a paid advertorial in the New Statesman for the organisation opposing limits on betting, suggesting that they would alienate red wall voters. In May 2022, Turley was appointed as an associate director at Arden Strategies, a political lobbying firm founded by former Labour cabinet minister Jim Murphy.

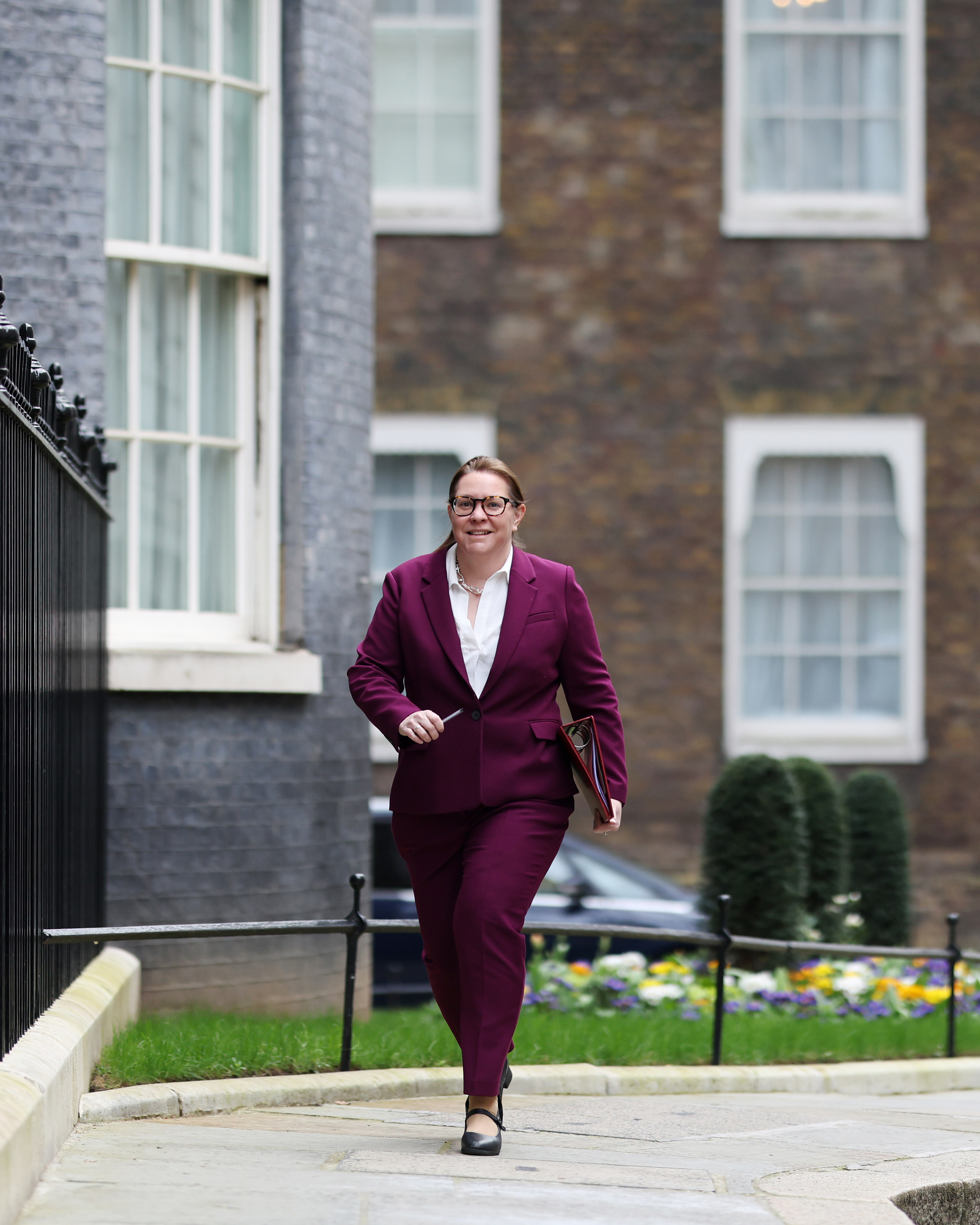
Turley attending a cabinet meeting in Downing Street in 2026

== Return to Parliament (2024–present) ==
=== 2024 election and frontbench ===
In July 2023, she won an open contest to be selected as the Labour candidate for Redcar at the 2024 general election.

On 4 July 2024 she was re-elected as Member of Parliament (MP) for Redcar. She won with a majority of 3,323 votes (8.7%). In the days following her re-election, Turley was appointed as a Junior Lord Commissioner of the Treasury, a Government Whip.

In the 2025 British cabinet reshuffle, she was appointed Minister without Portfolio and Chair of the Labour Party. She was subsequently appointed to the Privy Council.

In July 2026, she was appointed to the new government as Minister of State at the Home Office by Andy Burnham.

== Personal life ==
Turley has lived in Redcar since 2012. Previously she lived in Islington, London.

In the second half of 2017, Turley required five operations to alleviate problems with infected cysts; the emergency surgery caused her to suspend parliamentary work for over a month. She became a vocal campaigner on endometriosis, and launched an inquiry into women's experiences through the APPG on Endometriosis.

Parliament of the United Kingdom
Preceded by Ian Swales	Member of Parliament for Redcar; 2015–2019	Succeeded by Jacob Young
Preceded by Jacob Young	Member of Parliament for Redcar; 2024–present	Succeeded by Incumbent
Party political offices
Preceded by Gareth Thomas	Chair of the Co-operative Party; 2019–present	Incumbent
