= Stockton West =

UK Parliament constituency (since 2024)

Coordinates: 54.54°N 1.41°W

- County constituency for the House of Commons
- Interactive map of boundaries since 2024
- Location within North East England
- County: County Durham / North Yorkshire
- Electorate: 69,664 (2024)
- Major settlements: Stockton on Tees, Ingleby Barwick, Yarm, Eaglescliffe

Current constituency
- Created: 2024
- Member of Parliament: Matt Vickers (Conservative)
- Seats: One
- Created from: Stockton South; Sedgefield (part); Stockton North (minor part)

Stockton West is a constituency of the House of Commons in the UK Parliament. Further to the completion of the 2023 review of Westminster constituencies, it was first contested at the 2024 general election, when it was won by Matt Vickers of the Conservative Party (previously MP for Stockton South from 2019 to 2024). It is now the only seat held by the Conservatives in the North East of England.

== Constituency profile ==
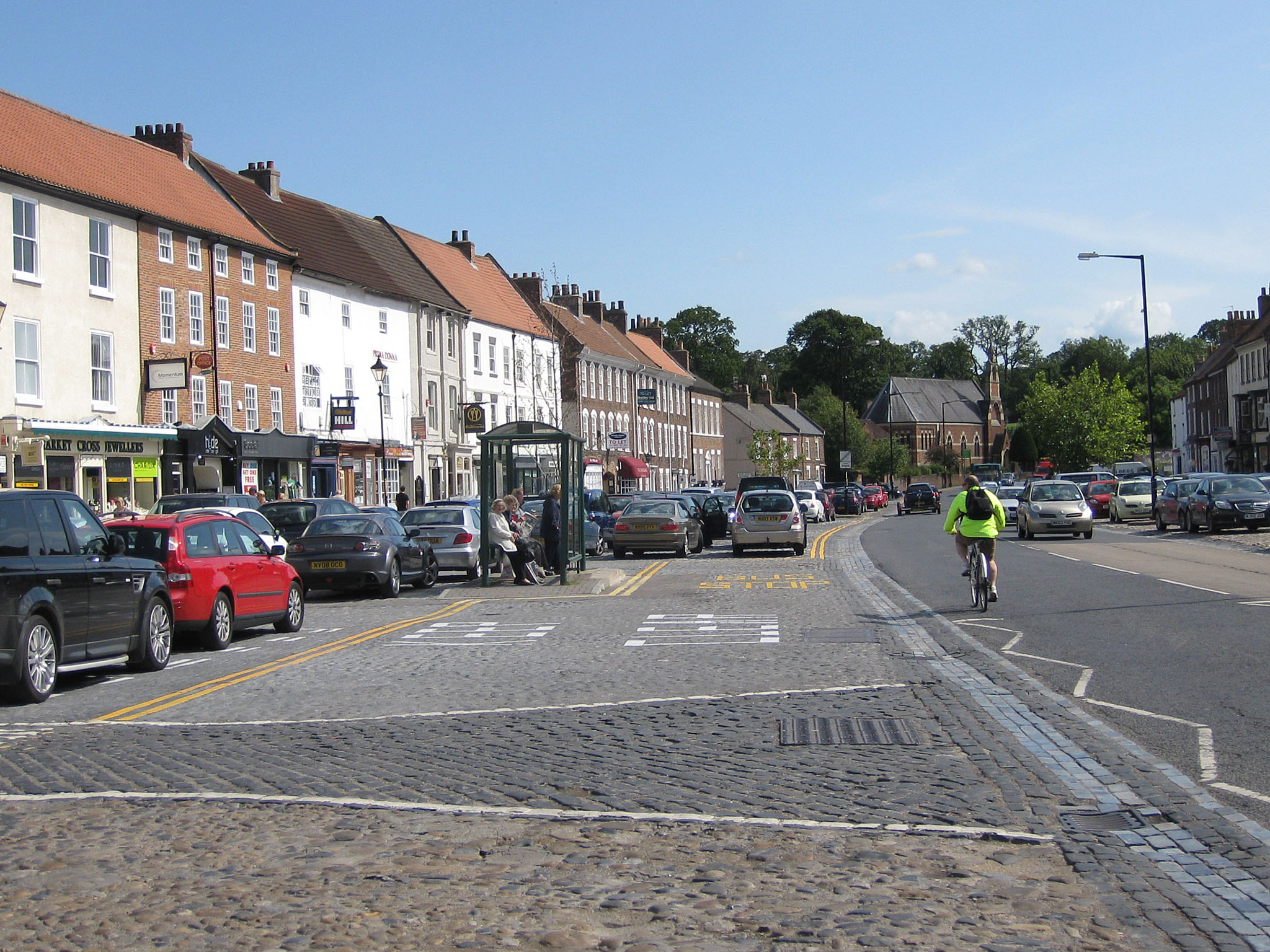
High Street, Yarm

Stockton West is a constituency in North East England, covering parts of County Durham and North Yorkshire. It includes the western suburbs of Stockton-on-Tees (Bishopsgarth, Fairfield and Hartburn), part of Thornaby-on-Tees, the towns of Ingleby Barwick and Yarm and the villages of Egglescliffe, Middleton St George and Hurworth-on-Tees.

Stockton is a large town within the Teesside urban area, located close to Middlesbrough and Thornaby-on-Tees. Stockton is traditionally a market town that experienced rapid growth during the Industrial Revolution as a centre for shipbuilding, ironmaking and engineering. The Stockton and Darlington Railway, the world's first steam-powered passenger railway, was built and opened here by George Stephenson in 1825. Yarm is a small, historic market town and Ingleby Barwick is a recent development that was mostly built in the 1970s and 1980s. Yarm and the Stockton suburbs are mostly wealthy and Ingleby Barwick is highly-affluent with most residents living in detached houses. House prices across the constituency are generally higher than the rest of North East England but lower than the UK average.

Stockton West has a large retired population and a low proportion of young adults. Residents have high levels of income and homeownership, and the child poverty rate is low. Residents are generally well-educated and are likely to be religious. A high proportion work in the accommodation, education and transport sectors, and the percentage claiming unemployment benefits is around half the UK-wide rate. White people made up 93% of the population at the 2021 census.

At the local council level, almost all seats in this constituency are represented by Conservatives, although some independent and localist councillors were elected in Ingleby Barwick. An estimated 55% of voters in Stockton West supported leaving the European Union in the 2016 referendum, marginally higher than the UK-wide figure of 52%.

== Boundaries ==
The constituency is defined as being composed of the following, as they existed on 1 December 2020:

- The Borough of Darlington wards of: Hurworth; Sadberge & Middleton St. George; and
- The Borough of Stockton-on-Tees wards of: Bishopsgarth and Elm Tree; Eaglescliffe; Fairfield; Grangefield; Hartburn; Ingleby Barwick East; Ingleby Barwick West; Village; Western Parishes; Yarm.

The seat comprises the majority of the abolished Stockton South constituency, extended westwards into rural areas to include the Western Parishes ward from Stockton North and the two Borough of Darlington wards from Sedgefield (abolished).

Following a local government boundary review in Stockton-on-Tees which came into effect in May 2023, the constituency now comprises the following from the 2024 general election:

- The Borough of Darlington wards of: Hurworth; Sadberge & Middleton St. George.
- The Borough of Stockton-on-Tees wards or part wards of: Bishopsgarth & Elm Tree; Eaglescliffe East (most); Eaglescliffe West; Fairfield; Grangefield (part); Hartburn (nearly all); Ingleby Barwick North; Ingleby Barwick South; Northern Parishes (part); Southern Villages; Village (most); Yarm; and a small part of Stainsby Hill.

== Members of Parliament ==
Stockton South prior to 2024

Election	Member	Party
2024	Matt Vickers	Conservative

== Elections ==
=== Elections in the 2020s ===
General election 2024: Stockton West (Note: Percentage difference from 2019 notional vote)
Party	Candidate	Votes	%	±%
Conservative	Matt Vickers	20,372	41.9	−14.6
Labour	Joe Dancey	18,233	37.5	+3.6
Reform	Stephen Matthews	6,833	14.0	+9.3
Green	Anna-Maria Toms	1,477	3.0	+2.5
Liberal Democrats	Nigel Boddy	1,203	2.5	−1.9
Independent	Mohammed Zaroof	263	0.5	N/A
Independent	Vivek Chhabra	106	0.2	N/A
Independent	Niko Omilana	106	0.2	N/A
Independents for Direct Democracy	Monty Brack	45	0.1	N/A
Majority		2,139	4.4	−18.2
Turnout		48,638	67.7	−6.5
Conservative win (new seat)				

=== Elections in the 2010s ===
2019 notional result
Party	Vote	%
Conservative	29,397	56.5
Labour	17,648	33.9
Brexit	2,427	4.7
Liberal Democrats	2,316	4.4
Green	262	0.5
Turnout	52,050	74.2
Electorate	70,108	

== See also ==
- Parliamentary constituencies in Cleveland
- Parliamentary constituencies in County Durham
- List of parliamentary constituencies in North East England (region)
