= James Wharton, Baron Wharton of Yarm =

British politician (born 1984)

The Right Honourable The Lord Wharton of Yarm
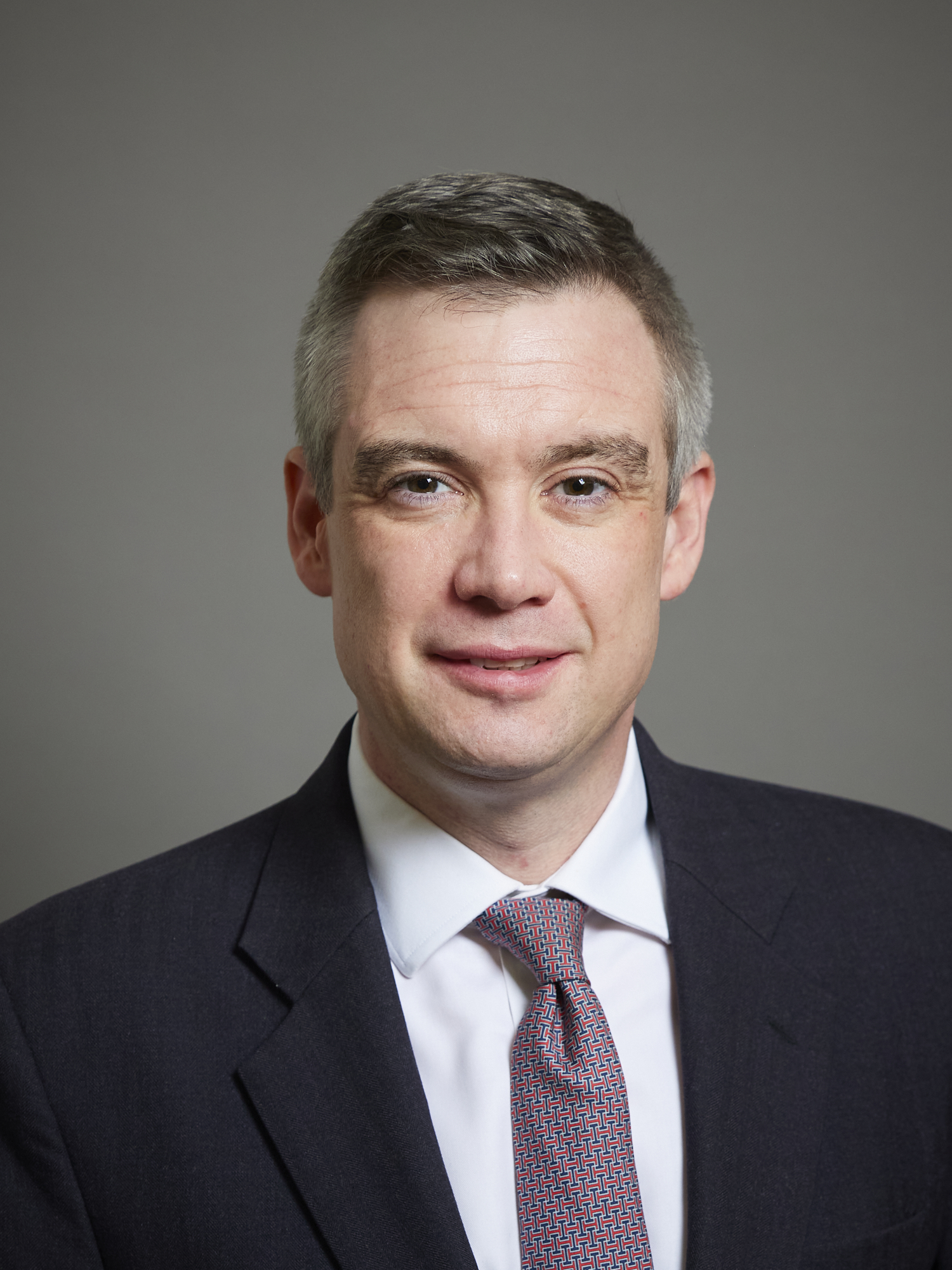
- Official portrait, 2024

Chair of the Office for Students
- In office 1 April 2021 – 9 July 2024
- Prime Minister: Boris Johnson; Liz Truss; Rishi Sunak
- Preceded by: Michael Barber
- Succeeded by: David Behan (interim)

Parliamentary Under-Secretary of State for International Development
- In office 17 July 2016 – 12 June 2017
- Prime Minister: Theresa May
- Preceded by: Nick Hurd
- Succeeded by: Zac Goldsmith (2019)

Parliamentary Under-Secretary of State for Local Growth and Northern Powerhouse
- In office 11 May 2015 – 17 July 2016
- Prime Minister: David Cameron
- Preceded by: Penny Mordaunt
- Succeeded by: Andrew Percy

Member of the House of Lords
- Lord Temporal
- Life peerage 2 September 2020

Member of Parliament for Stockton South
- In office 6 May 2010 – 3 May 2017
- Preceded by: Dari Taylor
- Succeeded by: Paul Williams

Personal details
- Born: James Stephen Wharton; 16 February 1984 (age 42) Wolviston, County Durham, England
- Party: Conservative
- Education: University College, Durham; University of Law

James Stephen Wharton, Baron Wharton of Yarm (born 16 February 1984) is a British Conservative Party politician. He was the Member of Parliament (MP) for his home constituency of Stockton South from the 2010 general election, until losing his seat in the 2017 general election. Wharton was appointed Minister for the Northern Powerhouse after his re-election in 2015 and moved to a ministerial position in the Department for International Development by Theresa May in 2016. In September 2020, he took his seat as a member of the House of Lords, taking the title Baron Wharton of Yarm.

== Early life ==
James Wharton grew up in Wolviston, County Durham.

He was educated at two private schools: Yarm School and St Peter's School, York. He then studied law at Durham University, and was a member of the Officers' Training Corps (OTC) (part of the Northumbrian UOTC). He was Race Awareness Officer at the Durham Students' Union for the 2003/2004 academic year. He also became President of the Durham University Conservative Association during the same period. Following his graduation from Durham, he studied the Legal Practice Course at The College of Law in York and qualified as a solicitor with BHP Law, a firm in the north east.

Wharton joined the Conservative Party in his teens, and was made chairman of his local association at 18.

== Parliamentary and political career ==
Wharton defeated the sitting Labour MP Dari Taylor to be elected as MP for Stockton South by 332 votes at the 2010 general election, making him his party's youngest MP at the age of 26, as well as one of its most precariously-placed.

From his election in May 2010 to November 2012, Wharton sat on the Public Accounts Committee. Wharton was one of 53 Conservative MPs who voted against the Government in favour of an amendment calling for a cut in the EU budget from 2014. Wharton claimed that his decision was "right for the British people and right for the nation's interests."

=== Ministerial career ===
Wharton was appointed parliamentary under-secretary of state for Communities and Local Government (Minister for Local Growth and the Northern Powerhouse), the first minister dedicated to the government proposal. However, he rarely left London — a fact that was only released after a judge ruled the department had to comply with a freedom of information request — a process which took 26 months. Following Theresa May's appointment as Prime Minister in July 2016, Wharton was appointed Parliamentary Under-Secretary of State at the Department for International Development.

=== EU Referendum Bill ===
On 16 May 2013, Wharton came top of a ballot of backbench MPs which entitled him to introduce a private member's bill during the 2013–14 parliamentary session. He chose to address the issue of a referendum on Britain's membership of the European Union by attempting to enshrine the Conservative Party Position into law, by introducing the European Union (Referendum) Bill 2013–14. He faced criticism from opposition MPs for taking on the EU Referendum Bill as his private member's bill, and it was suggested by them that the move may have been more advantageous to his political career than of direct benefit to his constituents. Wharton himself had previously suggested that too much time was spent debating the issue of Europe, but has since argued that his private member's bill was designed to put the issue to rest.

After the Bill did not pass the House of Lords, Wharton blamed Labour and Liberal Democrat obstructionism.

=== MP for Stockton South – local issues ===
After being elected MP for Stockton South, Wharton made stated his opposition to a development occurring in Preston Park. The plans, backed by Wharton's predecessor Dari Taylor, included relocating Egglescliffe School to the park. Wharton accused Stockton Borough Council of refusing to listen to the "democratic will of local people."

After a developer withdrew its £750,000 investment to regenerate Thornaby Town Hall, Wharton called for the building to be given to the Town Council. Originally the building belonged to Thornaby-on-Tees Borough Council; however, due to local government reorganisations, it was taken on by Stockton Borough Council in 1974. In 2012 the Town Council purchased the building from the borough council with the hope of enabling the building and the surrounding area to be restored.

In 2014, Wharton denied allegations by a UKIP councillor that a letter he wrote to constituents on the subject of the conflict in Gaza had "been sent to those residents who may reasonably be expected to be Muslims, based only on their names".

=== International affairs ===
Wharton has made a number of visits to Sri Lanka, including as a delegate of the Commonwealth Parliamentary Association, with the charity International Alert and as a guest of the Sri Lankan Government, including four visits in nine months during 2012. Wharton denied allegations that he had become too close to the Sri Lankan government, saying that he had made friends on both sides of the ethnic divide and that the lack of a Sri Lankan community in his constituency helped him be "objective"

=== Trocabart grant ===
In 2010, Wharton assisted Conservative Town Councillor Jason Hadlow's company Trocabart to secure £30,000 in aid from the former Regional Development Agency, One North East; the business failed and had been closed. He claimed that his only motivation was to promote the growth of jobs in the Teesside area. There has been no evidence of any financial connection between Wharton and the firm.

=== Parliamentary protocol ===
Wharton was accused of a breach of Parliamentary protocol, by attending a neighbouring constituency to take part in a photo call at the new Hitachi factory in Phil Wilson's Sedgefield constituency, without advising Wilson in advance. Wharton acknowledged that he had driven minister Brandon Lewis to the site and been photographed there, but said that he had not been there for the duration of the visit. Speaker John Bercow said that MPs should observe the spirit of the rules.

=== Boris Johnson leadership campaign ===
In 2019, Wharton took on the role of Campaign Manager for Boris Johnson in his successful bid to replace Theresa May as leader of the Conservative Party.

=== Peerage ===
In Boris Johnson's 2020 Dissolution Honours List, James was selected for a peerage. He was created Baron Wharton of Yarm, of Yarm in the County of North Yorkshire, in the morning of 2 September 2020. Lord Wharton was introduced to the House of Lords on 10 September 2020, becoming the youngest male member of the House at the age of 36.

=== OfS appointment ===
In 2021, Wharton was appointed chair of the Office for Students, an appointment endorsed by the Education Select Committee. Kate Green, the Shadow Secretary of State for Education, criticised the appointed for alleged cronyism. After it emerged that Wharton was chosen over Ivor Crewe, who was also interviewed, Wharton's lack of experience in higher education was unfavourably compared with that of Crewe. On a potential conflict of interest, as the independent regulator while retaining the Conservative whip as a peer, Wharton said he spoke to party whips and said "they would give me more latitude and understand that I may need to vote against or speak against some of the things the party in government could bring forward".

An independent review of the Office for Students led by Sir David Behan in 2024 found that 68% of higher and further education providers either disagreed or strongly disagreed that the OfS was independent of government. The most frequently raised issue by sector representatives as evidence of the OfS not being independent of government was the Wharton's retention of the whip, which was identified by the review of making the OfS's perceived independence liable to challenge.

Wharton resigned as chair on 9 July 2024, six months before his term was due to end and less than a week after the 2024 general election.

=== Conservative Political Action Conference, 2022 ===
In May 2022, Wharton addressed the Conservative Political Action Conference (CPAC) Hungary in Budapest. Wharton's attendance drew widespread criticism as the event was attended by a number of people who have previously expressed antisemitic and racist views. Wharton's video message was delivered on the same day as Zsolt Bayer, a Hungarian television talk show host who has been accused of racism, took to the stage. Bayer has previously called Jews "stinking excrement" and referred to Roma as "animals".

Anneliese Dodds, the shadow women and equalities secretary and chair of the Labour party, called on the Conservative Party to "condemn Lord Wharton for sharing a platform with racists, antisemites and right wing extremists".

Following Wharton's attendance at CPAC, the University and College Union called for Wharton’s resignation and the Union of Jewish Students voiced concern.

Parliament of the United Kingdom
Preceded by Dari Taylor	Member of Parliament for Stockton South; 2010–2017	Succeeded by Paul Williams
Orders of precedence in the United Kingdom
Preceded by The Lord Vaizey of Didcot	Gentlemen; Baron Wharton of Yarm	Succeeded by The Lord Austin of Dudley
