= Betting and Gaming Council =

The Betting and Gaming Council (BGC) is the UK's main gambling industry lobby group. Its CEO is Grainne Hurst, a former director for Entain. Their self-professed aim is to promote the betting and gaming industry and to try to ensure enjoyable, fair and safe betting and gaming experience for all of their customers. It acts as a a forum to facilitate collaboration, sharing of best practice, drive and champion standards, and create a single voice for the industry.

== History ==
The council launched in November 2019, replacing the Association of British Bookmakers, the Remote Gambling Association and the National Casino Forum. Brigid Simmonds was its founding chair.

In 2024, chief executive Michael Dugher became chair. Grainne Hurst, previously group corporate affairs director at Entain, succeeded him as chief executive in September that year. Dugher stepped down as chair in January 2026.

== Initiatives ==
In October 2021, the BGC launched the "Take Time to Think" campaign, replacing the industry's "When the Fun Stops, Stop" message. The campaign encouraged customers to use tools such as deposit limits, time-outs and self-exclusion. A randomised online experiment published in Behavioural Public Policy found no statistically credible effects of the message on the proportion of funds wagered, speed of play, number of roulette spins or use of a link to support information.

The council also co-organises the annual Safer Gambling Week with Bacta and the Bingo Association. The campaign publicises support services and tools for managing gambling, including deposit limits and time-outs.

The BGC commissioned GamProtect, a data-sharing scheme launched in 2024. If an operator closes an account after a customer reports serious gambling-related health problems, it can notify other companies participating in the scheme. Those companies can then check whether the customer has accounts with them and close those accounts too.

== Policy and lobbying ==
It has been subject to much criticism. For example Lord Foster, when contributing to the UK's select committee for culture, media and sport, accused them of making inaccurate statements on regulation. Kiran Stacey and Peter Walker writing in the Guardian criticised the BGC for entertaining and paying MPs with trips to the Brit awards and an Ed Sheeran concert.
