= Stockton South =

UK Parliament constituency (1983–2024)

- Former borough constituency for the House of Commons
- 2010–2024 boundary of Stockton South in the former county of Cleveland

- Location of the former county of Cleveland within England
- County: County Durham; North Yorkshire; (Tees Valley combined authority)
- Electorate: 74,698 (2018)
- Major settlements: Stockton, Thornaby, Yarm, Ingleby Barwick and Eaglescliffe

1983–2024
- Seats: One
- Created from: Stockton-on-Tees, Thornaby, Easington and Richmond (Yorks)
- Replaced by: Stockton West

Stockton South was a constituency (Note: A borough constituency (for the purposes of election expenses and type of returning officer)) represented in the House of Commons of the UK Parliament from 2019 until its abolition for the 2024 general election by Matt Vickers of the Conservative Party. (Note: As with all constituencies, the constituency elects one Member of Parliament (MP) by the first past the post system of election at least every five years.)

Under the 2023 review of Westminster constituencies, the seat was abolished; subject to moderate boundary changes, it was reformed as Stockton West.

== Boundaries ==
Map of 2010–2024 boundaries

1983–1997: The Borough of Stockton-on-Tees wards of Bishopsgarth, Egglescliffe, Fairfield, Grangefield, Hartburn, Ingleby Barwick, Mandale, Parkfield, Preston, Stainsby, Victoria, Village, and Yarm, and the Borough of Middlesbrough wards of Ayresome, Brookfield, and Kader.

1997–2010: The Borough of Stockton-on-Tees wards of Bishopsgarth, Egglescliffe, Elm Tree, Fairfield, Grangefield, Hartburn, Ingleby Barwick, Mandale, Parkfield, Preston, Stainsby, Victoria, Village, and Yarm. The three Middlesbrough wards were transferred to the redrawn Middlesbrough constituency.

2010–2024: The Borough of Stockton-on-Tees wards of Bishopsgarth and Elm Tree, Eaglescliffe, Fairfield, Grangefield, Hartburn, Ingleby Barwick East, Ingleby Barwick West, Mandale and Victoria, Parkfield and Oxbridge, Stainsby Hill, Thornaby-on-Tees, and Yarm.

2024: Constituency was abolished as a result of 2023 review of Westminster constituencies.

Stockton South consisted of the south-western half of Stockton-on-Tees and on the same bank, upstream, the town of Eaglescliffe – on the southern bank of the River Tees are the towns of Thornaby-on-Tees, Yarm, and Ingleby Barwick.

== History ==
The seat was formed from a combination of Stockton-on-Tees and Thornaby in 1983, predominantly as a replacement to the latter seat.

Political history

More middle-class than neighbouring Stockton North, this seat was first won by the SDP–Liberal Alliance in a narrow victory at the 1983. Ian Wrigglesworth, the former Labour MP for Thornaby, defected to the newly formed Social Democratic Party in 1981, and held the successor seat as the SDP candidate.

This result came after the Conservative candidate's nomination was withdrawn when he was revealed to have previously been in the National Front.

Following this, the seat was held by a Conservative for ten years, from 1987 to 1997. It was a bellwether in Labour's landslide at the 1997 general election, and its member, Dari Taylor, retained it until the 2010 general election, when the Conservative, James Wharton narrowly won back the seat.

It was the Conservative Party's only gain in the North East, with Wharton substantially increasing his majority at the 2015 general election. However, Labour's victory in the seat in 2017 saw the seat's 30 year status as a bellwether constituency come to an end. In 2019, the Conservatives took it back, in line with the general swing in their favour in multiple north east red wall seats, despite only being held by Labour for fifteen of its 39 years of existence.

== Constituency profile ==
Based on ONS data, workless claimants and registered jobseekers, were in May 2017 lower than the North East average of 5.9% and also lower than the national average of 4.6%, at 3.4% of the population.

== Members of Parliament ==
Election	Member	Party
1983	Ian Wrigglesworth	SDP
1987	Tim Devlin	Conservative
1997	Dari Taylor	Labour
2010	James Wharton	Conservative
2017	Paul Williams	Labour
2019	Matt Vickers	Conservative
2024	Constituency abolished	

== Election results 1983–2024 ==
=== Elections in the 1980s ===
General election 1983: Stockton South
Party	Candidate	Votes	%	±%
SDP	Ian Wrigglesworth	19,550	36.8	
Conservative	Tom Finnegan	19,448	36.6	
Labour	Frank Griffiths	13,998	26.3	
Independent	D. Fern	205	0.4	
Majority		102	0.2	
Turnout		53,201	72.1	
SDP win (new seat)				

General election 1987: Stockton South
Party	Candidate	Votes	%	±%
Conservative	Tim Devlin	20,833	35.0	▼1.6
SDP	Ian Wrigglesworth	20,059	33.7	▼3.1
Labour	John McKie Scott	18,600	31.3	▲5.0
Majority		774	1.3	N/A
Turnout		59,492	79.0	▲6.9
Conservative gain from SDP		Swing		

=== Elections in the 1990s ===
General election 1992: Stockton South
Party	Candidate	Votes	%	±%
Conservative	Tim Devlin	28,418	45.2	▲10.2
Labour	John McKie Scott	25,049	39.8	▲8.5
Liberal Democrats	Kay R. Kirkham	9,410	15.0	▼18.7
Majority		3,369	5.4	▲4.1
Turnout		62,877	82.8	▲3.8
Conservative hold		Swing	▲0.8	

General election 1997: Stockton South
Party	Candidate	Votes	%	±%
Labour	Dari Taylor	28,790	55.2	▲15.4
Conservative	Tim Devlin	17,205	33.0	▼12.2
Liberal Democrats	Peter Monck	4,721	9.1	▼5.9
Referendum	John Horner	1,400	2.7	New
Majority		11,585	22.2	N/A
Turnout		52,116	75.9	▼6.9
Labour gain from Conservative		Swing	▲14.0	

=== Elections in the 2000s ===
General election 2001: Stockton South
Party	Candidate	Votes	%	±%
Labour	Dari Taylor	23,414	53.0	▼3.3
Conservative	Tim Devlin	14,328	32.4	▼1.3
Liberal Democrats	Suzanne Fletcher	6,012	13.6	▲4.4
Socialist Alliance	Lawrence Coombes	455	1.0	New
Majority		9,086	20.6	▼2.0
Turnout		44,209	62.9	▼11.6
Labour hold		Swing	▼0.8	

General election 2005: Stockton South
Party	Candidate	Votes	%	±%
Labour	Dari Taylor	21,480	47.8	▼5.2
Conservative	James Gaddas	15,341	34.1	▲1.7
Liberal Democrats	Mike Barker	7,171	16.0	▲2.4
UKIP	Sandra Allison	931	2.1	New
Majority		6,139	13.7	▼6.9
Turnout		44,923	63.0	▲0.1
Labour hold		Swing	▼3.5	

=== Elections in the 2010s ===
General election 2010: Stockton South
Party	Candidate	Votes	%	±%
Conservative	James Wharton	19,577	38.9	▲4.7
Labour	Dari Taylor	19,245	38.3	▼9.4
Liberal Democrats	Jacquie Bell	7,600	15.1	▼1.0
BNP	Neil Sinclair	1,553	3.1	New
UKIP	Peter Braney	1,471	2.9	▲0.9
Independent	Yvonne Hossack	536	1.1	New
Christian	Ted Strike	302	0.6	New
Majority		332	0.6	N/A
Turnout		50,284	67.4	▲4.4
Conservative gain from Labour		Swing	▼7.0	

General election 2015: Stockton South
Party	Candidate	Votes	%	±%
Conservative	James Wharton	24,221	46.8	▲7.9
Labour	Louise Baldock	19,175	37.0	▼1.3
UKIP	Ted Strike	5,480	10.6	▲7.7
Liberal Democrats	Drew Durning	1,366	2.6	▼12.5
Green	Jacqui Lovell	952	1.8	New
Independent	Steve Walmsley	603	1.2	New
Majority		5,046	9.8	▲9.2
Turnout		51,797	69.0	▲1.6
Conservative hold		Swing	▲4.55	

General election 2017: Stockton South
Party	Candidate	Votes	%	±%
Labour	Paul Williams	26,102	48.5	▲11.5
Conservative	James Wharton	25,214	46.8	0.0
UKIP	David Outterside	1,186	2.2	▼8.4
Liberal Democrats	Drew Durning	951	1.8	▼0.8
Green	Jo Fitzgerald	371	0.7	▼1.1
Majority		888	1.7	N/A
Turnout		53,824	71.2	▲2.2
Labour gain from Conservative		Swing	▲5.8	

General election 2019: Stockton South
Party	Candidate	Votes	%	±%
Conservative	Matt Vickers	27,764	50.7	▲3.9
Labour	Paul Williams	22,504	41.1	▼7.4
Liberal Democrats	Brendan Devlin	2,338	4.3	▲2.5
Brexit Party	John Prescott (Note: Not the Labour member of the House of Lords)	2,196	4.0	New
Majority		5,260	9.6	N/A
Turnout		54,802	71.3	▲0.1
Conservative gain from Labour		Swing	▲5.6	

== See also ==
- Parliamentary constituencies in Cleveland
- History of parliamentary constituencies and boundaries in Cleveland
