= Dari Taylor =

British politician

Dari Taylor MP

Member of Parliament for Stockton South
- In office 1 May 1997 – 12 April 2010
- Preceded by: Tim Devlin
- Succeeded by: James Wharton

Personal details
- Born: Dari Jean Jones; 13 December 1944 (age 81) Rhondda, Wales
- Party: Labour
- Spouse: David Taylor
- Relatives: Daniel Jones (father)
- Education: University of Nottingham; University of Durham

Dari Jean Taylor (née Jones; born 13 December 1944) is a British Labour Party politician who was the Member of Parliament (MP) for Stockton South between the 1997 and 2010 general elections.

== Biography ==
Taylor was born into a staunch Labour Party-supporting family in Rhondda, South Wales, in December 1944. She attended Ynyshir Girls' School before moving to Burnley Municipal College when her father, Daniel Jones, was elected to Parliament as the Labour MP for Burnley in 1959. He remained the MP for Burnley until 1983. She graduated with a BA from the University of Nottingham and an MA from the University of Durham, then lectured at a number of colleges of Further Education.

Taylor was active in the Trade Union movement from 1990 until her election to Parliament in 1997. She initially worked as a researcher and in 1993 became the Regional Educational Officer for the GMB Union in the Northern Region. She was also an elected member of Sunderland Metropolitan Council between 1986 and the time of her election to Parliament.

She describes her interests as issues relating to women, health, the economy, industry, defence, international development, disabilities, drugs and crime and all aspects of child welfare, especially adoption.

== Parliamentary career ==
Taylor was selected to stand for election for Labour through an all-women shortlist. Taylor was elected as Member of Parliament for Stockton South in 1997, until losing the seat at the 2010 general election.

Taylor served as Parliamentary private secretary to Lewis Moonie and Lord Bach (Ministry of Defence) from 2001 to 2003 and then as Parliamentary Private Secretary to Hazel Blears, Home Office minister between 2003 and 2005. Her latest such position was again as a Parliamentary Private Secretary, to Phil Hope at the Department of Health in 2008–09.

She was the chairman of the North East Regional Select Committee and a member of the Intelligence and Security Committee. Taylor was secretary of Labour Friends of India, Vice-chair of the Azerbaijan Group and the treasurer for the Opera Group.

Whilst in Parliament, Taylor was Chair of the Adoption and Fostering Group, Secretary for the Cardiac Risk in the Young Group and Vice-chair of the Children Group.

== Controversies ==
=== Misuses of stationery ===
In early November 2008 Taylor was found guilty of misusing House of Commons stationery for political purposes, with four complaints about her upheld. Of particular note was that this was the second occasion Taylor had committed such offences, having already been forced to repay for misused stationery and postage in April 2007.

A House of Commons Committee on Standards and Privileges stated:

"We strongly deprecate the continued misuse by Ms Taylor of House stationery for political purposes...we are surprised that an experienced Member has repeated previous breaches of the rules and has failed to act in accordance with advice given by the House authorities. We particularly regret the fact that Ms Taylor has continued to dispute parts of the Commissioner's findings and we are very disappointed that she has offered no apology. We conclude that Ms Taylor should pay the House authorities the sum of £500 and submit an unequivocal written apology. "

Taylor suggested that the rules were too "confusing" and that she had "tried her best" to stick to them. She complied with the orders of the committee.

=== Expenses ===
In 2006, on the subject of not being top of north east MP expenses, Taylor said she was disappointed not to be higher in the list. Referring to her position behind Dr Kumar and Sharon Hodgson, Taylor said: "I want to know what Ashok and Sharon are doing better than me." In 2007, Taylor was the second costliest MP in the North East region (Stockton South), claiming £159,178, and putting her in 24th place in the Westminster league table. In May 2009, Taylor attracted some criticism for her expenses claims, in particular for claiming £18,100 over four years for food – the maximum possible claim. She also claimed £54,329 for mortgage interest payments over four years on her two-bedroomed London apartment, £40 per month for a cleaner to perform housekeeping duties and £310 for tiling a bathroom. She was one of the 98 MPs who voted to keep MPs' expenses secret. She was one of the few MPs to publish their expenses independently, but had blacked out the parts that revealed staffers' personal details.

== Voting record ==
Taylor strongly supported the 2003 invasion of Iraq. She supports a fully elected House of Lords and bills which favoured a partially elected alternative. She is in favour of nuclear power and the replacement of Trident. She is described as a "Labour loyalist".

== Personal life ==
She married David Taylor in July 1970 and they have one daughter. She enjoys classical music, walking and travelling.

Parliament of the United Kingdom
Preceded by Tim Devlin	Member of Parliament for Stockton South; 1997 – 2010	Succeeded by James Wharton
