= Paul Williams (Labour politician) =

British Labour Party politician and physician

Paul Williams OBE
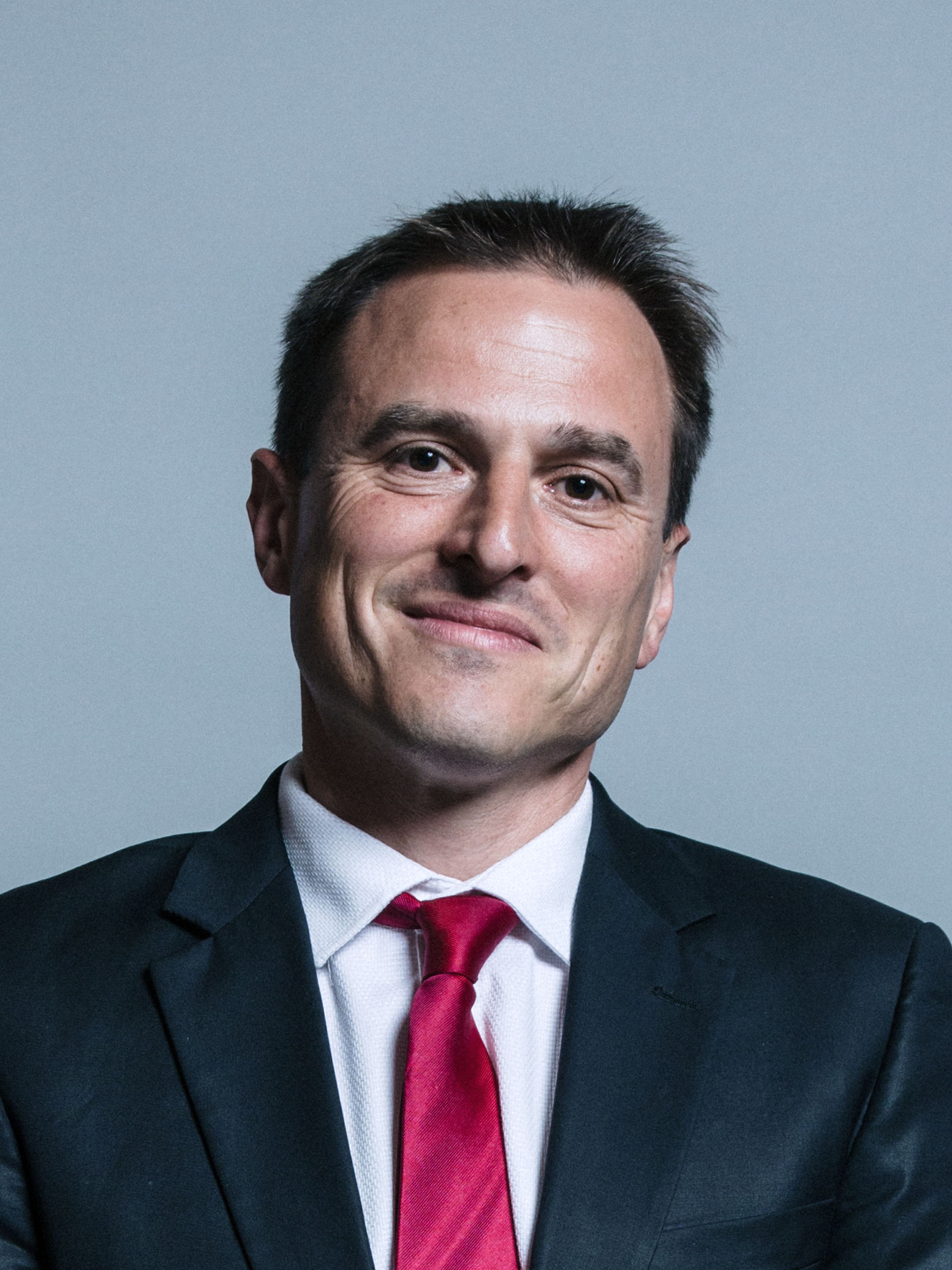
- Official portrait, 2017

Member of Parliament for Stockton South
- In office 8 June 2017 – 6 November 2019
- Preceded by: James Wharton
- Succeeded by: Matt Vickers

Personal details
- Born: Paul Daniel Williams; 23 August 1972 (age 54) Canterbury, England
- Party: Labour
- Spouse: Vicky Holt (m. 2020)
- Children: 2
- Education: University of Newcastle; University of Liverpool

Paul Daniel Williams (born 23 August 1972) is a British general practitioner (GP) and former Labour Party politician, who served as the Member of Parliament (MP) for Stockton South from 2017 to 2019, when he lost his seat to the Conservative candidate Matt Vickers in the 2019 general election. In May 2021, Williams stood as the Labour Party candidate in the 2021 Hartlepool by-election but lost to the Conservative candidate Jill Mortimer.

== Early life and career ==
Williams was born on 23 August 1972 in Canterbury, Kent, England. His parents worked as a teacher and a nurse. His early education was at the Queen's School, Wisbech (now Thomas Clarkson Academy) in Cambridgeshire. He began to support the Labour Party during the UK miners' strike (1984–85), and joined the party when he was studying medicine at the Newcastle University Medical School. Williams also obtained a Diploma in Tropical Medicine from the University of Liverpool.

After graduating, he specialised in general practice. Prior to entering politics, Williams worked as a GP partner in Stockton and was also the chief executive officer of Hartlepool and Stockton Health GP Federation, which oversees 37 practices in Hartlepool and Stockton. Williams also ran a health programme in Uganda for five years involving the implementation of a community health insurance scheme. This involved helping to set up a community hospital near the Bwindi Impenetrable Forest which provided HIV, malaria and tuberculosis services.

== Parliamentary career ==
Williams was selected to contest the Stockton South constituency by the Labour Party at the 2017 UK general election. He had previously made the shortlist for the 2013 South Shields by-election. Williams went on to be elected as MP with 26,102 votes and a majority of 888 over incumbent Conservative Party MP James Wharton who had held the seat since the 2010 general election. On national political issues, Williams has campaigned significantly on public health and the NHS. His maiden speech focussed on increasing efforts in preventative care in the NHS. After the election, he was chosen to be part of the Health Select Committee. and chaired its inquiry into health in the first 1000 days of life.

Williams was a signatory of the MPs Not Border Guards pledge not to report constituents to the Home Office for Immigration Enforcement.

In 2018, Williams accepted the gift of a trip to Saudi Arabia worth £8,762 from the country's government. Following the excursion, he said he saw a "modern, progressive" side to the country, which that had “totally changed" his overall view of the country.

At the 2019 general election, he lost his seat to the Conservative candidate, Matt Vickers.

In March 2021, following the resignation of Hartlepool MP Mike Hill, Williams was selected as Labour's candidate for the 2021 Hartlepool by-election. He had been Labour's candidate for Cleveland Police and Crime Commissioner, in a May 2021 election, but withdrew in order to contest Hartlepool. His selection was criticised as he had supported the UK remaining within the EU and a referendum on the EU withdrawal agreement whereas Hartlepool had strongly supported Brexit. The selection process was also criticised as he was the only candidate on the party's shortlist. During the by-election campaign, he apologised for an "inappropriate" tweet in 2011. Conservative candidate Jill Mortimer won the seat which had been represented by a Labour MP since 1974. Mortimer won with a majority of 6,940 (23.2%) votes.

== Political views ==
=== Health and the NHS ===
Williams supports accountable care systems in the NHS led by primary care and public health. He opposes markets within the NHS, as he feels that they promote "expensive, complex activity". He supports a move away from the partnership model of general practice to a system provided at scale by GP-led not-for-profit provider organisations, employing salaried physicians. Williams said, "The law is creating unnecessary privatisation that isn’t working in the interests of patients. This is a ridiculous fragmentation of services, at a time when the rhetoric from government and NHS leaders has all been about integration." He has advocated for all GP trainees and newly qualified mental health nurses, social workers and community nurses being employed directly by integrated care trusts, arguing that this would reduce care costs.

During his brief career as an MP, Williams led a debate in the House of Commons highlighting the variation in experience of new mothers when receiving postnatal GP checks, and arguing for the inclusion of a specific check six weeks after birth for maternal mental health and wellbeing to be included in the national GP contract.

Williams was also the co-chair of the All-Party Parliamentary Group on Adverse Childhood Experiences. In his constituency Williams worked to reduce waiting times for autism diagnosis from more than four years to less than twelve months.

=== European Union ===
While 62% of voters in Stockton-on-Tees voted to leave the European Union, Williams was in favour of Britain remaining in the European Union, having stated that "no form of Brexit is better than the deal we already have as members of the European Union", and broke the Labour Party whip on six occasions to support a second referendum on the UK's exit from the EU.

== Personal life ==
His long-time partner is Vicky Holt, who works as a nurse; they got married on 17 December 2020. They have two daughters and live in Stockton. Williams continued to work as a GP in Stockton to maintain his medical licence while he was an MP. He returned to work in the NHS full time after losing his seat. He was a trustee of The ARC, Stockton-on-Tees and the national charity The Parent-Infant Foundation, and a former board member of Catalyst, a local volunteering organisation.

Williams was appointed Officer of the Order of the British Empire (OBE) in the 2021 New Year Honours for services to Parliament and to healthcare in Stockton-on-Tees.

Parliament of the United Kingdom
Preceded by James Wharton	Member of Parliament for Stockton South; 2017–2019	Succeeded by Matt Vickers
