= Jacob Young (politician) =

British Conservative politician

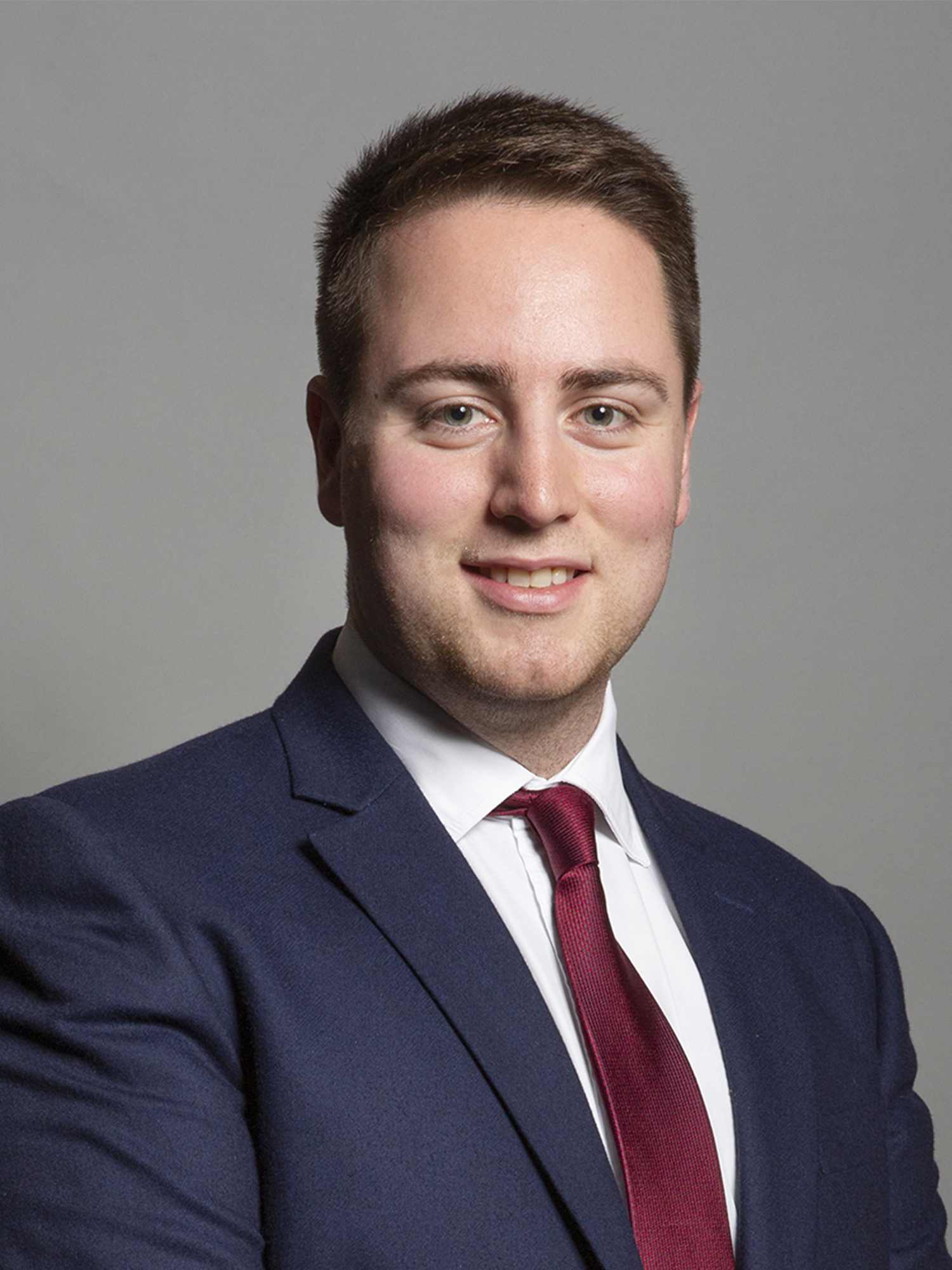
- Official portrait, 2019

Parliamentary Under-Secretary of State for Levelling Up
- In office 18 September 2023 – 5 July 2024
- Prime Minister: Rishi Sunak
- Preceded by: Dehenna Davison
- Succeeded by: Alex Norris

Assistant Government Whip
- In office 20 September 2022 – 18 September 2023
- Prime Minister: Liz Truss; Rishi Sunak
- Succeeded by: Gagan Mohindra

Member of Parliament for Redcar
- In office 12 December 2019 – 30 May 2024
- Preceded by: Anna Turley
- Succeeded by: Anna Turley

Personal details
- Born: 2 February 1993 (age 33) Middlesbrough, North Yorkshire, England
- Party: Conservative
- Spouse: Jack Robinson-Young (m. 2022)
- Education: Teesside University

Jacob Young (born 2 February 1993) is a former British Conservative Party politician and served as Parliamentary Under-Secretary of State for Levelling Up from 18 September 2023, until losing his seat in July 2024. He previously served as Assistant Government Whip between September 2022 and September 2023. He was elected as MP for Redcar at the 2019 general election. He was the first Conservative MP to represent the constituency.

== Early life and career ==
Jacob Young was born in Middlesbrough, North Yorkshire as the son of Terrence Anthony Young and Elizabeth Anne Young. He grew up in a working-class family in Middlesbrough, and has six siblings. Young attended Macmillan Academy, and then studied at Redcar & Cleveland College and the TTE Technical Institute. After this, he obtained a Higher National Certificate in chemical engineering at Teesside University. Whilst at university, he joined the Conservative Party.

He then trained as an apprentice technician and worked as a process operator for Chemoxy International Ltd. Young later became a lead technician for a petrochemicals company.

Through his church, Young was involved in a food bank in Middlesbrough and a centre of the charity Christians Against Poverty. He described the approach towards poverty of the latter as a politically formative experience, "Christians Against Poverty was more about teaching people how to budget using the money that they had and how to pay back some of their debt over an extended period of time. That attitude drew me to the Conservatives – the idea that if you work hard and you want to succeed that you can."

== Political career ==
Young stood as the Conservative candidate in Redcar at the 2015 general election, coming fourth with 16.2% of the vote behind the Labour Party candidate Anna Turley, and the Liberal Democrat and UKIP candidates.

He campaigned for Brexit prior to the 2016 United Kingdom European Union membership referendum.

At the snap 2017 general election, Young stood in Middlesbrough, coming second with 26.7% of the vote behind the incumbent Labour MP Andy McDonald.

In the same year, Young was elected as the councillor for Coulby Newham ward on Middlesbrough Council. In February 2019, he announced that he would be standing down from his council seat as he no longer lived in the town, and had moved to Saltburn-by-the-Sea. In May 2019, he stood as a candidate for one of the three council seats for Saltburn ward on Redcar and Cleveland Borough Council, finishing fourth.

== Parliamentary career ==
Young was selected as the Conservative prospective parliamentary candidate for Redcar on 11 November that year. At the 2019 general election, Young was elected as MP for Redcar, winning with 46.1% of the vote and a majority of 3,527. He is the first Conservative to represent the constituency.

In a profile by GQ in February 2021, he was described as "socially liberal" and a "Thatcherite".

On 6 June 2022, after a vote of no confidence in the leadership of Boris Johnson was called, Young announced that he would be supporting Johnson as he felt that he had "got the big calls right" on Brexit, the COVID-19 pandemic and the Russian invasion of Ukraine, and added that he believed Johnson "cares about Teesside, I believe, more than any prime minister has in history." Young resigned as Parliamentary Private Secretary for the Department for Levelling Up, Housing and Communities on 6 July 2022, as part of the July 2022 United Kingdom government crisis.

He endorsed Rishi Sunak in the 2022 Conservative Party leadership election.

In September 2023, he replaced Dehenna Davison as Parliamentary Under-Secretary of State for Levelling Up.

== Post-parliamentary career ==
Following his defeat at the 2024 UK General Election, Young joined infrastructure consultants, Agilia as Director of Corporate Affairs. In a December 2024 interview with The Northern Echo, Young said it took almost 100 days to find a new career direction.

== Personal life ==
Young married his partner Jack Robinson-Young in a ceremony in Redcar on 8 April 2022. They resided in Saltburn. Young now lives in Guisborough. He is a Christian.

Parliament of the United Kingdom
Preceded by Anna Turley	Member of Parliament for Redcar; 2019–2024	Succeeded by Anna Turley
