= Redcar (constituency) =

UK Parliament constituency (since 1974)

Coordinates: 54.59°N 1.09°W

- Borough constituency for the House of Commons
- Interactive map of boundaries since 2024
- Location within North East England
- County: North Yorkshire (area formerly in the county of Cleveland)
- Electorate: 71,331 (March 2020)
- Major settlements: Marske-by-the-Sea, Redcar, Eston, South Bank, Saltburn-by-the-Sea

Current constituency
- Created: 1974
- Member of Parliament: Anna Turley (Labour and Co-operative)
- Seats: One
- Created from: Cleveland

Redcar is a constituency (Note: A borough constituency (for the purposes of election expenses and type of returning officer)) represented in the House of Commons of the UK Parliament since 2024 by Anna Turley, of the Labour and Co-operative parties. She previously represented the constituency between 2015 and 2019, when she was defeated by Conservative Jacob Young. (Note: As with all constituencies, the constituency elects one Member of Parliament (MP) by the first past the post system of election at least every five years.)

== Constituency profile ==
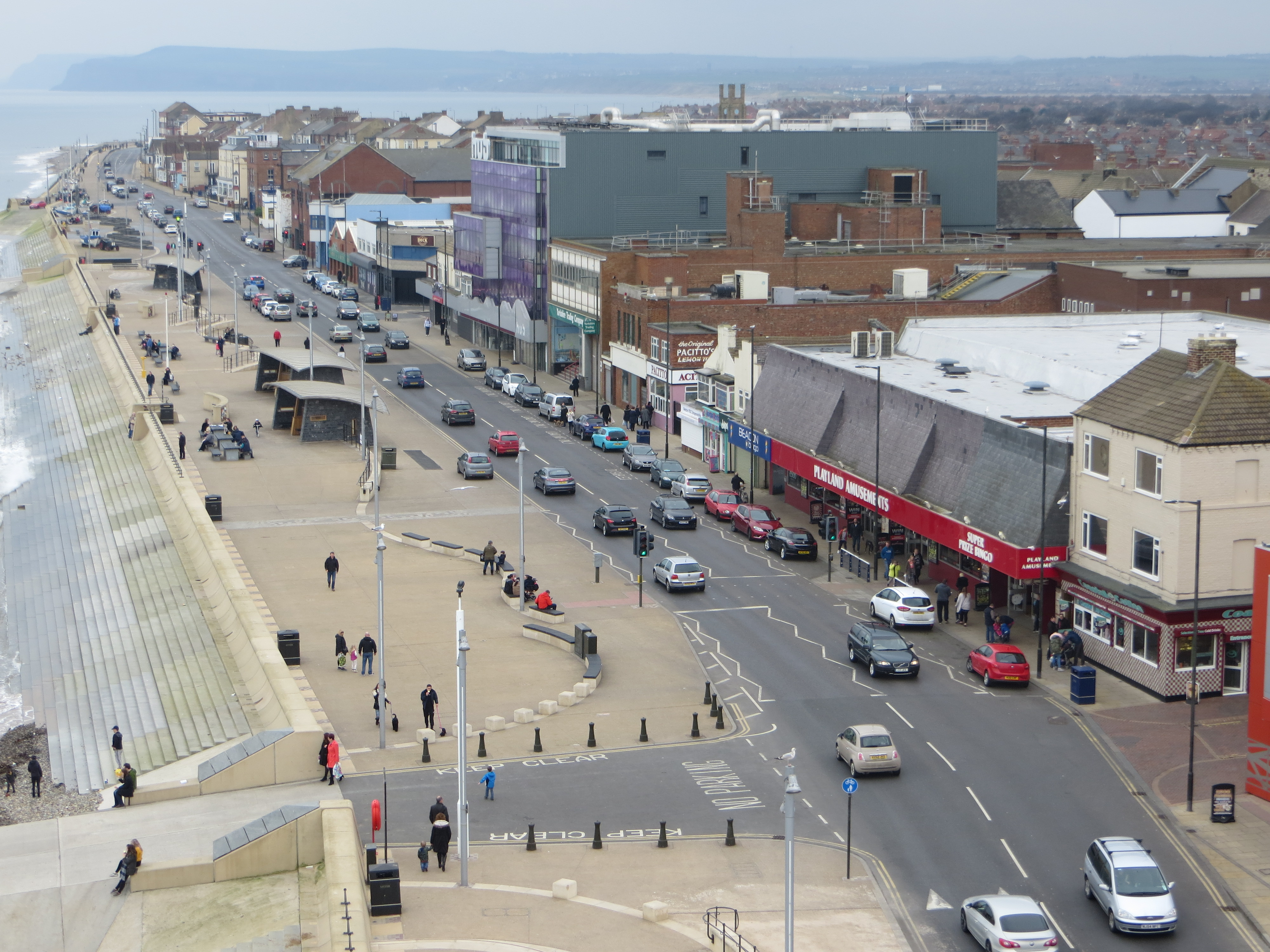
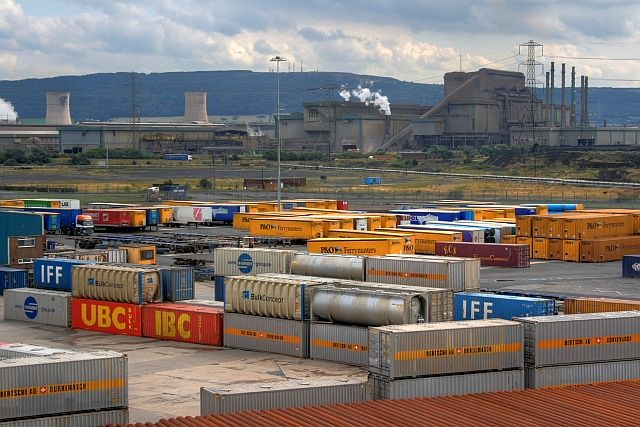
Redcar Esplanade (top) and Teesport with the now-demolished Teesside Steelworks in the background (bottom)

Redcar is a constituency in North Yorkshire in England within the Redcar and Cleveland borough. It is named after its main settlement, Redcar, which has a population of around 38,000. Other settlements include the suburban areas of Ormesby, Normanby, Eston, Teesville, South Bank and Grangetown on the outskirts of Middlesbrough, the town of Saltburn-by-the-Sea and the villages of Marske-by-the-Sea and New Marske.

Redcar is a coastal town with an industrial history. It was a small village until the mid-19th century when iron ore was discovered in the hills close to Eston and the town developed into a seaside resort and steelworking centre. The decline of domestic tourism and the British steel industry left this area with high levels of deprivation, especially in Saltburn, Grangetown, South Bank and Redcar town centre, although the constituency contains some wealthier neighbourhoods in Marske, Normanby and the outskirts of Redcar. Most residents live in mid-20th century semi-detached properties and the average house price is less than half the nationwide average.

Redcar contains a large retired population and below-average proportions of young and middle-aged adults. Residents have low levels of income, average rates of homeownership, and the child poverty rate is high. They generally have low levels of education and a high proportion work in the manufacturing and transport sectors. The percentage of residents claiming unemployment benefits is in line with the UK-wide rate. White people made up 97% of the population at the 2021 census.

Most of the constituency is represented by the Labour Party at the local borough council. Some Conservatives and Liberal Democrats were elected in Marske and the wealthier suburbs, and Saltburn elected independents. Voters in Redcar strongly supported leaving the European Union in the 2016 referendum; an estimated 66% voted in favour of Brexit compared to the UK-wide figure of 52%.

== Boundaries ==
Map of 2010–2024 boundaries

=== Historic ===
1974–1983: The County Borough of Teesside wards of Coatham, Eston Grange, Kirkleatham, Ormesby, Redcar, and South Bank.

1983–1997: The Borough of Langbaurgh wards of Bankside, Church Lane, Coatham, Dormanstown, Eston, Grangetown, Kirkleatham, Newcomen, Normanby, Ormesby, Overfields, Redcar, South Bank, Teesville, and West Dyke.

1997–2010: The Borough of Langbaurgh-on-Tees wards of Coatham, Dormanstown, Eston, Grangetown, Kirkleatham, Longbeck, Newcomen, Normanby, Ormesby, Redcar, St Germain's, South Bank, Teesville, and West Dyke.

2010–2024: The Borough of Redcar and Cleveland wards of Coatham, Dormanstown, Eston, Grangetown, Kirkleatham, Longbeck, Newcomen, Normanby, Ormesby, St Germain's, South Bank, Teesville, West Dyke, and Zetland.

=== Current ===
Further to the 2023 review of Westminster constituencies, which came into effect for the 2024 general election, the composition of the constituency is as follows (as they existed on 1 December 2020):

- The Borough of Redcar and Cleveland wards of: Coatham; Dormanstown; Eston; Grangetown; Kirkleatham; Longbeck; Newcomen; Normanby; Ormesby; St. Germain’s; Saltburn; South Bank; Teesville; West Dyke; Wheatlands; Zetland.

The constituency was expanded slightly to bring the electorate within the permitted range, by adding the town of Saltburn-by-the-Sea from Middlesbrough South and East Cleveland.

The Redcar constituency on the Cleveland coast is formed from parts of the Redcar and Cleveland district. It takes its name from the coastal resort of Redcar although much of the population lives in the traditionally solid Labour areas between Redcar and Middlesbrough (such as Grangetown, Eston, Normanby, Ormesby and South Bank). It also includes Dormanstown, Kirkleatham, Marske-by-the-Sea and Saltburn-by-the-Sea.

== History ==
Created in 1974 from the former Cleveland constituency, Redcar was a solidly Labour seat that was held by Mo Mowlam from 1987, who became Secretary of State for Northern Ireland in the Blair Government after Labour's landslide victory in 1997, with her majority of over 20,000 the largest in the seat's history.

After Mowlam stood down from the seat in 2001, Redcar became noted for its political volatility and very large swings towards and against all the three main political parties. It was gained by the Liberal Democrats in the 2010 general election on a massive 21.8% swing from Labour, the largest swing at the time in England since the Second World War outside of by-elections. In 2015, however, the sitting MP Ian Swales did not seek re-election, and Labour regained the seat on another huge swing of 18.9% away from the Liberal Democrats, who polled just ahead of UKIP with the Conservative candidate Jacob Young in fourth.

In 2019, the seat was one of a number of long standing Labour seats in the north of England which fell to the Conservatives, won by Young on a considerable swing of over 15%, but at the 2024 election it was regained for Labour by the previous MP, Anna Turley on another large swing of nearly 10%.

== Members of Parliament ==
Election	Member	Party
Feb 1974	James Tinn	Labour
1987	Mo Mowlam	Labour
2001	Vera Baird	Labour
2010	Ian Swales	Liberal Democrats
2015	Anna Turley	Labour Co-op
2019	Jacob Young	Conservative
2024	Anna Turley	Labour Co-op

== Elections ==
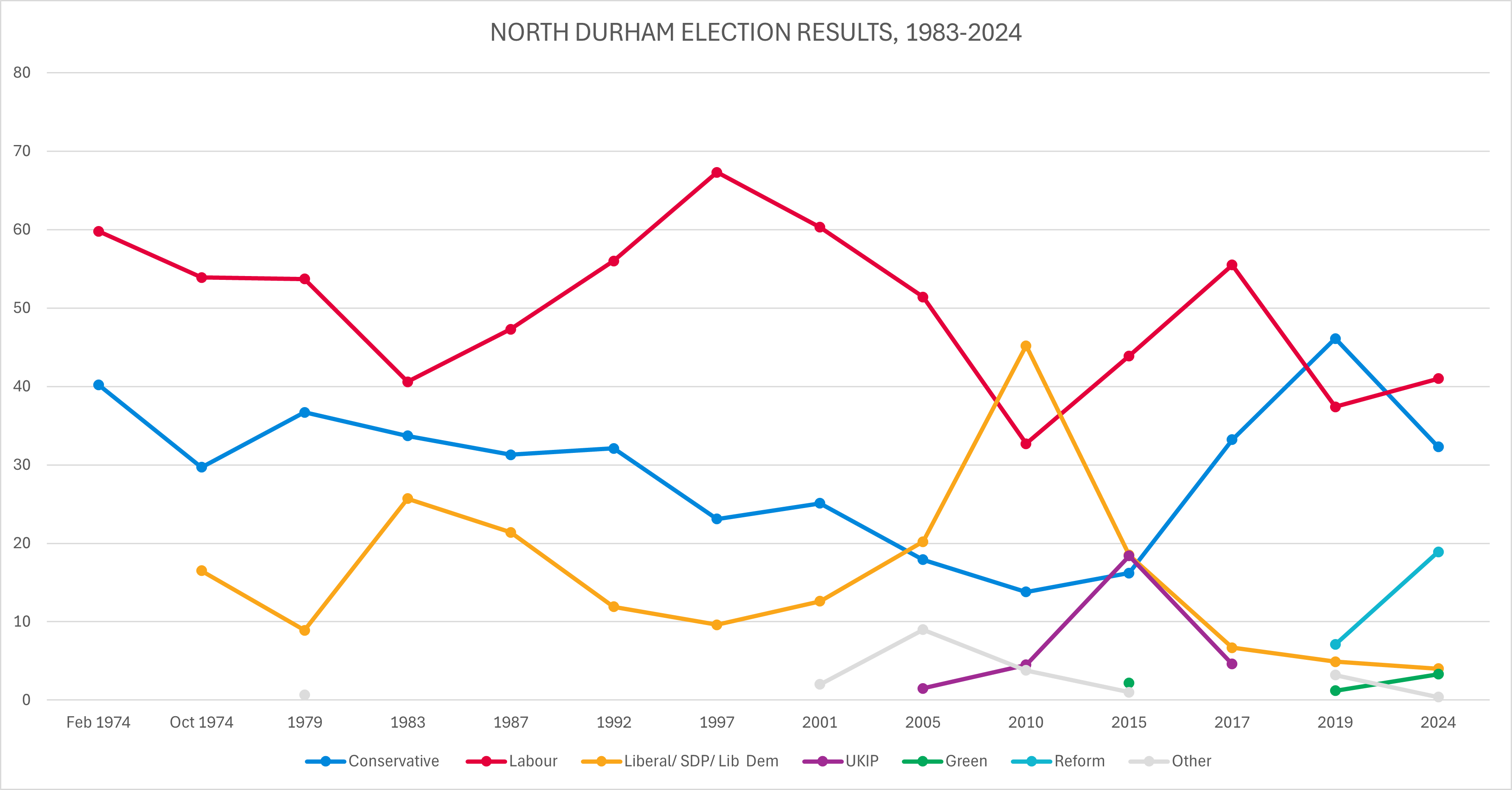
Election results 1974-2024

=== Elections in the 2020s ===
General election 2024: Redcar
Party	Candidate	Votes	%	±%
Labour Co-op	Anna Turley	15,663	41.0	+4.4
Conservative	Jacob Young	12,340	32.3	−15.2
Reform	John Davies	7,216	18.9	+12.4
Liberal Democrats	Chris Jones	1,542	4.0	−0.8
Green	Ruth Hatton	1,279	3.3	+1.7
SDP	Gary Conlin	169	0.4	N/A
Majority		3,323	8.7	N/A
Turnout		38,209	54.4	−8.3
Labour gain from Conservative		Swing	+9.8	

=== Elections in the 2010s ===
General election 2019: Redcar
Party	Candidate	Votes	%	±%
Conservative	Jacob Young	18,811	46.1	▲12.9
Labour Co-op	Anna Turley	15,284	37.4	▼18.1
Brexit Party	Jacqui Cummins	2,915	7.1	New
Liberal Democrats	Karen King	2,018	4.9	▼1.8
Independent	Frankie Wales	1,323	3.2	New
Green	Rowan Mclaughlin	491	1.2	New
Majority		3,527	8.7	N/A
Turnout		40,842	62.0	▼1.8
Conservative gain from Labour Co-op		Swing	▲15.4	

General election 2017: Redcar
Party	Candidate	Votes	%	±%
Labour Co-op	Anna Turley	23,623	55.5	▲11.6
Conservative	Peter Gibson	14,138	33.2	▲17.0
Liberal Democrats	Josh Mason	2,849	6.7	▼11.8
UKIP	Chris Gallacher	1,950	4.6	▼13.8
Majority		9,485	22.3	▼3.1
Turnout		42,626	63.8	▲0.7
Labour Co-op hold		Swing	▼2.7	

General election 2015: Redcar
Party	Candidate	Votes	%	±%
Labour Co-op	Anna Turley	17,946	43.9	▲11.2
Liberal Democrats	Josh Mason	7,558	18.5	▼26.7
UKIP	Christopher Gallacher	7,516	18.4	▲13.9
Conservative	Jacob Young	6,630	16.2	▲2.4
Green	Peter Pinkney	880	2.2	New
North East	Philip Lockey	389	1.0	New
Majority		10,388	25.4	▲13.0
Turnout		40,919	63.1	▲0.6
Labour Co-op gain from Liberal Democrats		Swing	▲18.9	

General election 2010: Redcar
Party	Candidate	Votes	%	±%
Liberal Democrats	Ian Swales	18,955	45.2	▲25.0
Labour	Vera Baird	13,741	32.7	▼18.6
Conservative	Steve Mastin	5,790	13.8	▼4.1
UKIP	Martin Bulmer	1,875	4.5	▲3.0
BNP	Kevin Broughton	1,475	3.5	▲1.0
TUSC	Hannah Walter	127	0.3	New
Majority		5,214	12.4	N/A
Turnout		41,963	62.5	▲4.5
Liberal Democrats gain from Labour		Swing	▲21.8	

=== Elections in the 2000s ===
General election 2005: Redcar
Party	Candidate	Votes	%	±%
Labour	Vera Baird	19,968	51.4	▼8.9
Liberal Democrats	Ian Swales	7,852	20.2	▲7.6
Conservative	Jonathan Lehrle	6,954	17.9	▼7.2
Independent	Christopher McGlade	2,379	6.1	New
BNP	Andrew Harris	985	2.5	New
UKIP	Edward Walker	564	1.5	New
Socialist Labour	John Taylor	159	0.4	▼1.6
Majority		12,116	31.2	▼4.0
Turnout		38,861	58.0	▲1.7
Labour hold		Swing	▼8.3	

General election 2001: Redcar
Party	Candidate	Votes	%	±%
Labour	Vera Baird	23,026	60.3	▼7.0
Conservative	Chris Main	9,583	25.1	▲2.0
Liberal Democrats	Stan Wilson	4,817	12.6	▲3.0
Socialist Labour	John Taylor	772	2.0	New
Majority		13,443	35.2	▼9.0
Turnout		38,198	56.3	▼14.7
Labour hold		Swing	▼4.6	

=== Elections in the 1990s ===
General election 1997: Redcar
Party	Candidate	Votes	%	±%
Labour	Mo Mowlam	32,972	67.3	▲11.3
Conservative	Andrew Isaacs	11,308	23.1	▼9.0
Liberal Democrats	Joyce Benbow	4,679	9.6	▼2.3
Majority		21,664	44.2	▲20.3
Turnout		48,859	71.0	▼6.7
Labour hold		Swing	▲10.2	

General election 1992: Redcar
Party	Candidate	Votes	%	±%
Labour	Mo Mowlam	27,184	56.0	▲8.7
Conservative	Robert Goodwill	15,607	32.1	▲0.8
Liberal Democrats	Chris Abbott	5,789	11.9	▼9.5
Majority		11,577	23.9	▲7.9
Turnout		48,580	77.7	▲1.7
Labour hold		Swing	▲3.9	

=== Elections in the 1980s ===
General election 1987: Redcar
Party	Candidate	Votes	%	±%
Labour	Mo Mowlam	22,824	47.3	▲6.7
Conservative	Peter Bassett	15,089	31.3	▼2.4
SDP	Glyn Nightingale	10,298	21.4	▼1.3
Majority		7,735	16.0	▲9.1
Turnout		48,211	76.1	▼2.8
Labour hold		Swing	▲4.5	

General election 1983: Redcar
Party	Candidate	Votes	%	±%
Labour	James Tinn	18,348	40.6	
Conservative	Peter Bassett	15,244	33.7	
SDP	Glyn Nightingale	11,614	25.7	
Majority		3,104	6.9	
Turnout		45,206	71.3	
Labour hold		Swing		

=== Elections in the 1970s ===
General election 1979: Teesside, Redcar
Party	Candidate	Votes	%	±%
Labour	James Tinn	25,470	53.68	
Conservative	Elizabeth Cottrell	17,417	36.71	
Liberal	A. Elliott	4,225	8.91	
Independent	E. Lloyd	333	0.70	New
Majority		8,053	16.97	
Turnout		47,445	75.90	
Labour hold		Swing		

General election October 1974: Teesside, Redcar
Party	Candidate	Votes	%	±%
Labour	James Tinn	23,204	53.86	
Conservative	R. Hall	12,774	29.65	
Liberal	N. Clark	7,101	16.48	New
Majority		10,430	24.21	
Turnout		43,079	69.08	
Labour hold		Swing		

General election February 1974: Teesside, Redcar
Party	Candidate	Votes	%	±%
Labour	James Tinn	28,252	59.79	
Conservative	R. Hall	18,998	40.21	
Majority		9,254	19.58	
Turnout		47,250	76.66	
Labour win (new seat)				

== See also ==
- List of parliamentary constituencies in Cleveland
- History of parliamentary constituencies and boundaries in Cleveland
