= Tim Devlin =

Tim Devlin MP

Member of Parliament for Stockton South
- In office 11 June 1987 – 1 May 1997
- Preceded by: Ian Wrigglesworth
- Succeeded by: Dari Taylor

Personal details
- Born: 13 June 1959 (age 66)
- Party: Conservative
- Education: Dulwich College
- Alma mater: London School of Economics; City University London

Timothy Robert Devlin (born 13 June 1959) is a British barrister and former Conservative Party politician. From 1987 to 1997, he was the member of parliament for Stockton South.

== Early life ==
Devlin was born on 13 June 1959. He was educated at Dulwich College, an all-boys public school in London. He studied at the London School of Economics, the City University London, and the Inns of Court School of Law.

== Career ==
=== Political career ===
Devlin was first elected the member of parliament (MP) for the Stockton South constituency in the 1987 general election, when he defeated Ian Wrigglesworth. From 1992 to 1994, he was Parliamentary Private Secretary to the Attorney-General.

Devlin was unseated in the 1997 general election, losing to Labour's Dari Taylor. He tried to regain the seat in 2001, but was beaten by Taylor again.

Tim Devlin, while a Tory MP, helped arrange a meeting on 28 January 1993 in which Customs was ordered to drop drug-smuggling charges against Middlesbrough drug trafficker Brian Charrington. The case was dropped when it emerged that Charrington was a paid informant for HM Customs officers. All the accused, including Charrington and Curtis Warren, were acquitted of all charges.

=== Legal career ===
Devlin was called to the bar in 1985, thereby qualifying as a barrister. He is currently a member of Furnival Chambers.

Parliament of the United Kingdom
Preceded by Ian Wrigglesworth	Member of Parliament for Stockton South; 1987–1997	Succeeded by Dari Taylor
