= 2023 Redcar and Cleveland Borough Council election =

2023 local election in Redcar & Cleveland

- 4 May 2023

All 59 seats on Redcar and Cleveland Borough Council 30 seats needed for a majority

| | First party | Second party |
|---|---|---|
| Leader | (Note: Of the 24 independents on the council prior to the election, thirteen formed "The Independent Group" led by Mary Lanigan, two formed the "Cleveland Independent Group", and the other nine did not belong to a group.) | Alec Brown |
| Party | Independent | Labour |
| Last election | 18 (Note: Counting the Teesville Independents as independents; they were a registered party at the 2019 election but deregistered with the Electoral Commission the following month.) | 15 |
| Seats before | 24 | 15 |
| Seats won | 13 | 23 |
| Seat change | ▼5 | ▲8 |
| | Third party | Fourth party |
| Leader | Karen King | Andrea Turner |
| Party | Liberal Democrats | Conservative |
| Last election | 13 | 11 |
| Seats before | 14 | 6 |
| Seats won | 11 | 12 |
| Seat change | ▼2 | ▲1 |
- Results by seat in the 2023 Redcar and Cleveland Borough Council Election
Leader before election
Mary Lanigan
Independent
No overall control
Leader after election
Alec Brown
Labour
No overall control

The 2023 Redcar and Cleveland Borough Council election took place on 4 May 2023 to elect members of Redcar and Cleveland Borough Council in England. This was on the same day as other local elections in England. All 59 seats were up for election. Redcar and Cleveland Borough Council's elections are held every four years.

== Summary ==
Prior to the election the council was under no overall control, being run by a coalition of the Liberal Democrats and the "Independent Group", comprising 13 of the independents. The leader of the council was independent councillor Mary Lanigan.

The council remained under no overall control after the election. Labour was the largest party, and both it and the Conservatives made gains, largely at the expense of the independents and Liberal Democrats. Mary Lanigan lost her seat.

A minority Labour administration formed after the election, with Labour group leader Alec Brown being appointed leader of the council at the subsequent annual council meeting on 25 May 2023.

The Borough Council composition prior to the 2023 Election. The councillors sit in a Westminster seating arrangement, as such this is reflected by the graph.

2023 Redcar & Cleveland Borough Council election
| Party | Seats | Gains | Losses | Net gain/loss | Seats % | Votes % | Votes | +/− |
|---|---|---|---|---|---|---|---|---|
| Labour | 23 | 12 | 5 | ▲8 | 39 | 31.6 | 23,546 | |
| Conservative | 12 | 10 | 6 | ▲1 | 20.3 | 26.0 | 19,399 | |
| Independent | 13 | 2 | 11 | ▼5 | 22.0 | 22.9 | 17,072 | |
| Liberal Democrats | 11 | 2 | 4 | ▼2 | 18.6 | 17.7 | 13,196 | |
| Green | 0 | – | – | Steady | 0.0 | 1.4 | 1,076 | |
| Reform | 0 | – | – | Steady | 0 | 0.34 | 257 | |

== Ward results ==
The results for each ward were as follows, with an asterisk indicating an incumbent councillor standing for re-election:

=== Belmont ===
Belmont
| Party | Candidate | Votes | % | ±% |
|---|---|---|---|---|
| Independent | Peter Berry* | 515 | 40.0 | −10.4 |
| Conservative | Carolyn Curr | 503 | 39.0 | +5.1 |
| Conservative | Miranda Jupp | 426 | 33.0 | +1.0 |
| Independent | Anne Watts* | 393 | 30.5 | −8.3 |
| Labour | Adrian Robson | 290 | 22.5 | +6.3 |
| Labour | Paul Fairley | 241 | 18.7 | +3.2 |
| Liberal Democrats | Janet Smith | 94 | 7.3 | New |
| Turnout | | 1,289 | 35.8 | −2.1 |
| Independent hold | | Swing | | |
| Conservative gain from Independent | | Swing | | |

=== Brotton ===
Brotton
| Party | Candidate | Votes | % | ±% |
|---|---|---|---|---|
| Independent | Graham Cutler* | 882 | 68.1 | +15.5 |
| Independent | Barry Hunt* | 820 | 63.3 | +10.6 |
| Independent | Martin Fletcher* | 776 | 59.9 | +22.3 |
| Labour | Ian Urwin | 306 | 23.6 | −0.2 |
| Conservative | Lynne Henderson | 244 | 18.8 | −13.8 |
| Labour | Alison Suthers | 224 | 17.3 | −3.4 |
| Conservative | Stephanie Hinson | 160 | 12.4 | −7.8 |
| Turnout | | 1,295 | 25.9 | −15.1 |
| Independent hold | | Swing | | |
| Independent hold | | Swing | | |
| Independent hold | | Swing | | |

=== Coatham ===
Coatham
| Party | Candidate | Votes | % | ±% |
|---|---|---|---|---|
| Labour | Carl Quartermain* | 437 | 49.6 | +14.8 |
| Labour | Lynne Rynn | 370 | 42.0 | +10.3 |
| Independent | Neil Baldwin* | 264 | 30.0 | −22.3 |
| Conservative | David Tabner | 178 | 20.2 | +5.4 |
| Conservative | Nicholas Fardon | 167 | 19.0 | N/A |
| Independent | Ethan Haw | 120 | 13.6 | N/A |
| Liberal Democrats | Sabrina Thompson | 88 | 10.0 | −12.1 |
| Turnout | | 881 | 26.3 | −4.1 |
| Labour hold | | Swing | | |
| Labour gain from Independent | | Swing | | |

=== Dormanstown ===
Dormanstown
| Party | Candidate | Votes | % | ±% |
|---|---|---|---|---|
| Independent | Debbie Powlay | 392 | 46.5 | N/A |
| Labour | Ceri Cawley* | 355 | 42.1 | −3.2 |
| Independent | Chris Powlay | 338 | 40.1 | N/A |
| Labour | Christine Long | 306 | 36.3 | −7.8 |
| Conservative | Peter Storey | 117 | 13.9 | −0.6 |
| Liberal Democrats | Eve Hall | 72 | 8.5 | −13.2 |
| Turnout | | 843 | 23.4 | −1.1 |
| Independent gain from Labour | | Swing | | |
| Labour hold | | Swing | | |

=== Eston ===
Eston
| Party | Candidate | Votes | % | ±% |
|---|---|---|---|---|
| Conservative | Stephen Martin | 636 | 48.6 | +21.7 |
| Conservative | David Taylor | 632 | 48.3 | N/A |
| Labour | Christopher Massey* | 561 | 42.9 | −5.1 |
| Labour | Daniel Rees* | 555 | 42.4 | −8.9 |
| Labour | Geraldine Williams* | 554 | 42.4 | −3.0 |
| Liberal Democrats | Sophie Lax-Keeler | 171 | 13.1 | −17.8 |
| Turnout | | 1,308 | 24.4 | −0.3 |
| Conservative gain from Labour | | Swing | | |
| Conservative gain from Labour | | Swing | | |
| Labour hold | | Swing | | |

=== Grangetown ===
Grangetown
| Party | Candidate | Votes | % | ±% |
|---|---|---|---|---|
| Labour | Adam Brook* | 419 | 72.0 | +31.0 |
| Labour | Lynn Pallister* | 417 | 71.6 | +27.9 |
| Conservative | Andrea Booth | 135 | 23.2 | +13.7 |
| Conservative | Linda King | 116 | 19.9 | N/A |
| Turnout | | 586 | 15.8 | −6.6 |
| Labour hold | | Swing | | |
| Labour hold | | Swing | | |

=== Guisborough ===
Guisborough
| Party | Candidate | Votes | % | ±% |
|---|---|---|---|---|
| Labour | Lisa Belshaw | 691 | 39.5 | +8.3 |
| Labour | Bill Suthers | 629 | 36.0 | +5.6 |
| Independent | Bill Clarke* | 619 | 35.4 | −19.9 |
| Conservative | Andrew Hixon* | 558 | 31.9 | +0.4 |
| Labour | Andy Leon | 571 | 32.7 | +5.9 |
| Conservative | Alma Thrower | 539 | 30.8 | +6.2 |
| Independent | Leslie Oakley | 223 | 12.8 | N/A |
| Independent | Denise Bunn | 166 | 9.5 | N/A |
| Green | Caroline Weltch | 162 | 9.3 | N/A |
| Reform | Charlie Thompson | 137 | 7.8 | N/A |
| Independent | James Bunn | 122 | 7.0 | N/A |
| Independent | Fred (Frederick) Page | 106 | 6.1 | N/A |
| Liberal Democrats | Carolyn Cree | 87 | 5.0 | N/A |
| Turnout | | 1,770 | 31.5 | −2.9 |
| Labour gain from Conservative | | Swing | | |
| Labour hold | | Swing | | |
| Independent hold | | Swing | | |

=== Hutton ===
Hutton
| Party | Candidate | Votes | % | ±% |
|---|---|---|---|---|
| Liberal Democrats | Jemma Joy | 1,030 | 47.0 | +13.4 |
| Conservative | Julie Hart | 846 | 38.6 | −8.1 |
| Liberal Democrats | Graham Jeffery* | 812 | 37.0 | −9.7 |
| Liberal Democrats | Graeme Kidd | 789 | 36.0 | +7.4 |
| Conservative | Kellen Hadfield | 757 | 34.5 | −11.1 |
| Conservative | Steve Waterfield* | 750 | 34.2 | −4.9 |
| Labour | Fiona Hampton | 351 | 16.0 | +2.1 |
| Labour | Veronica Moore | 281 | 12.8 | +0.8 |
| Independent | Michael Dakin | 209 | 9.5 | N/A |
| Independent | Malcolm Griffiths* | 174 | 7.9 | −31.2 |
| Reform | Katie Mann | 120 | 5.5 | N/A |
| Turnout | | 2,212 | 39.7 | −1.9 |
| Liberal Democrats gain from Independent | | Swing | | |
| Conservative hold | | Swing | | |
| Liberal Democrats gain from Conservative | | Swing | | |

=== Kirkleatham ===
Kirkleatham
| Party | Candidate | Votes | % | ±% |
|---|---|---|---|---|
| Conservative | Peter Grogan | 596 | 41.8 | N/A |
| Labour | Alec Brown* | 559 | 39.2 | −2.1 |
| Labour | Marian Fairley | 527 | 37.0 | +1.7 |
| Labour | Charlie Brady* | 514 | 36.0 | −2.6 |
| Conservative | Joseph Sayer | 442 | 31.0 | N/A |
| Independent | Theresa Cave | 296 | 20.8 | N/A |
| Independent | Mike Lockwood* | 242 | 17.0 | −30.2 |
| Independent | Robert Dunn | 187 | 13.1 | N/A |
| Liberal Democrats | John Hannon | 138 | 9.7 | −23.4 |
| Liberal Democrats | Mark Hannon | 108 | 7.6 | N/A |
| Liberal Democrats | William Wilson | 93 | 6.5 | N/A |
| Turnout | | 1,436 | 36.8 | +10.9 |
| Conservative gain from Independent | | Swing | | |
| Labour hold | | Swing | | |
| Labour hold | | Swing | | |

=== Lockwood ===
Lockwood
| Party | Candidate | Votes | % | ±% |
|---|---|---|---|---|
| East Cleveland Independent | Stephen Kay* | 491 | 71.4 | -14.0 |
| Labour | Ian Solomon | 164 | 23.8 | +14.2 |
| Conservative | Graham Hutchinson | 33 | 4.8 | −0.3 |
| Turnout | | 689 | 39.4 | −1.3 |
| East Cleveland Independent hold | | Swing | | |

=== Loftus ===
Loftus
| Party | Candidate | Votes | % | ±% |
|---|---|---|---|---|
| Independent | Wayne Davies* | 570 | 45.0 | −18.3 |
| Labour | Linda White | 540 | 42.6 | +31.4 |
| Independent | Timothy Gray* | 491 | 38.7 | −15.3 |
| Conservative | Allan Greening | 453 | 35.7 | +9.5 |
| Independent | Mary Lanigan* | 405 | 31.9 | −27.3 |
| Conservative | Igraine Gray | 313 | 24.7 | +6.6 |
| Labour | Ramin Peroznejad | 231 | 18.2 | +7.3 |
| Turnout | | 1,274 | 27.6 | −10.3 |
| Independent hold | | Swing | | |
| Labour gain from Independent | | Swing | | |
| Independent hold | | Swing | | |

=== Longbeck ===
‡ Longbeck results were announced on 9 May after three recounts. It was the last ward in England to declare.

Longbeck
| Party | Candidate | Votes | % | ±% |
|---|---|---|---|---|
| Labour Co-op | Luke Myer | 707 | 51.5 | +38.9 |
| Independent | Vera Rider* | 413 | 30.1 | −10.3 |
| Conservative | Andrea Turner* | 409 | 29.8 | −10.6 |
| Independent | Vic Jeffries | 342 | 24.9 | −12.5 |
| Conservative | Steve Turner | 293 | 21.4 | −16.4 |
| Independent | Stephen Crane | 246 | 17.9 | N/A |
| Turnout | | 1,378 | 40.7 | +4.5 |
| Labour gain from Conservative | | Swing | | |
| Independent gain from Conservative | | Swing | | |

=== Newcomen ===
Newcomen
| Party | Candidate | Votes | % | ±% |
|---|---|---|---|---|
| Labour | Janine Craven | 535 | 50.3 | +26.6 |
| Labour | Carrie Richardson* | 529 | 49.8 | +20.3 |
| Independent | Billy Wells* | 328 | 30.9 | −7.5 |
| Conservative | Harrison Himsworth | 261 | 24.6 | +17.7 |
| Independent | Mark Appleby | 216 | 20.3 | N/A |
| Conservative | Michael Kirke | 194 | 18.3 | N/A |
| Turnout | | 1,063 | 28.6 | −1.4 |
| Labour hold | | Swing | | |
| Labour gain from Independent | | Swing | | |

=== Normanby ===
Normanby
| Party | Candidate | Votes | % | ±% |
|---|---|---|---|---|
| Conservative | Paul Salvin* | 789 | 43.9 | +14.2 |
| Conservative | Paul McInnes | 758 | 42.2 | N/A |
| Conservative | Curt Pugh | 712 | 39.6 | N/A |
| Labour | Billy Ayre* | 694 | 38.6 | −1.1 |
| Labour | Paul Garland | 642 | 35.7 | −8.3 |
| Labour | Simon Meech-Simpson | 564 | 31.4 | −7.7 |
| Independent | Rita Richardson | 421 | 23.4 | N/A |
| Independent | Chris Gallacher* | 250 | 13.9 | −27.0 |
| Liberal Democrats | Stuart Saunders | 93 | 5.2 | −17.5 |
| Turnout | | 1,800 | 33.1 | +2.2 |
| Conservative hold | | Swing | | |
| Conservative gain from Labour | | Swing | | |
| Conservative gain from Labour | | Swing | | |

=== Ormesby ===
Ormesby
| Party | Candidate | Votes | % | ±% |
|---|---|---|---|---|
| Liberal Democrats | Carole Morgan* | 914 | 66.3 | −7.1 |
| Liberal Democrats | Ian Hart | 865 | 62.7 | −8.9 |
| Liberal Democrats | Glyn Nightingale* | 852 | 61.8 | −11.7 |
| Labour | Leanne Reed | 270 | 19.6 | +4.2 |
| Labour | Cameron Norrie | 259 | 18.8 | +6.0 |
| Labour | Millie Wood | 250 | 18.1 | +6.5 |
| Conservative | Julie Elders | 216 | 15.7 | +5.0 |
| Conservative | Katherine Smith | 194 | 14.1 | N/A |
| Conservative | Garth Siner | 177 | 12.8 | N/A |
| Turnout | | 1,383 | 28.4 | −3.3 |
| Liberal Democrats hold | | Swing | | |
| Liberal Democrats hold | | Swing | | |
| Liberal Democrats hold | | Swing | | |

=== Saltburn ===
Saltburn
| Party | Candidate | Votes | % | ±% |
|---|---|---|---|---|
| Independent | Stuart Smith* | 1,385 | 58.6 | −12.6 |
| Independent | Phillip Thompson* | 1,041 | 44.1 | +1.6 |
| Independent | Craig Hannaway* | 805 | 34.1 | +3.2 |
| Labour | Kath Sainsbury | 763 | 32.3 | +6.9 |
| Labour | Gary Wilkinson | 675 | 28.6 | +6.3 |
| Green | Rowan McLaughlin | 342 | 14.5 | −0.5 |
| Green | Abdul Rauf | 319 | 13.5 | N/A |
| Conservative | Iain Graham | 311 | 13.2 | −16.2 |
| Conservative | Simon Asker | 304 | 12.9 | +2.3 |
| Green | Kerry Dooley | 253 | 10.7 | N/A |
| Turnout | | 2,365 | 49.1 | −2.7 |
| Independent hold | | Swing | | |
| Independent hold | | Swing | | |
| Independent hold | | Swing | | |

=== Skelton East ===
Skelton East
| Party | Candidate | Votes | % | ±% |
|---|---|---|---|---|
| Conservative | Andy Oliver | 419 | 43.2 | −1.1 |
| Conservative | Justin Thompson | 369 | 38.0 | −4.3 |
| Labour | Sam Pratt | 315 | 32.5 | +8.5 |
| Labour | Norman Macleod | 289 | 29.8 | +6.8 |
| Independent | Darren Craig | 229 | 23.6 | N/A |
| Independent | Dave Barker | 153 | 15.8 | +0.2 |
| Liberal Democrats | Tracy Jacobs | 29 | 3.0 | N/A |
| Turnout | | 970 | 28.9 | −6.5 |
| Conservative gain from Independent | | Swing | | |
| Conservative gain from Independent | | Swing | | |

=== Skelton West ===
Skelton West
| Party | Candidate | Votes | % | ±% |
|---|---|---|---|---|
| Labour | Ursula Earl | 542 | 48.6 | +12.6 |
| Labour | John McCue | 480 | 43.0 | +12.7 |
| Conservative | Craig Holmes* | 470 | 42.1 | −9.5 |
| Conservative | Lee Holmes* | 384 | 34.4 | −10.2 |
| Independent | Julie Craig* | 180 | 16.1 | N/A |
| Independent | Emma Marshall | 78 | 7.0 | N/A |
| Liberal Democrats | Katy Sykes | 16 | 1.4 | −6.0 |
| Liberal Democrats | Graeme Thompson | 12 | 1.1 | N/A |
| Turnout | | 1,117 | 34.6 | −1.2 |
| Labour gain from Conservative | | Swing | | |
| Labour gain from Conservative | | Swing | | |

=== South Bank ===
South Bank
| Party | Candidate | Votes | % | ±% |
|---|---|---|---|---|
| Labour | Neil Bendelow | 563 | 67.5 | +26.6 |
| Labour | Izzy Attwood | 499 | 59.8 | +20.5 |
| Independent | Sandra Smith* | 192 | 23.0 | −23.7 |
| Independent | Les Harper | 155 | 18.6 | N/A |
| Conservative | Lucas Pentland | 108 | 12.9 | +5.9 |
| Turnout | | 835 | 24.0 | −3.8 |
| Labour hold | | Swing | | |
| Labour gain from Independent | | Swing | | |

=== St. Germain's ===
St. Germain's
| Party | Candidate | Votes | % | ±% |
|---|---|---|---|---|
| Liberal Democrats | Tristan Learoyd | 1,275 | 62.9 | +18.1 |
| Liberal Democrats | Karen King* | 1,260 | 62.2 | +12.8 |
| Liberal Democrats | Kendra Evans | 819 | 40.4 | −1.7 |
| Independent | Peter Finlinson | 561 | 27.7 | N/A |
| Labour | Peter Mahan | 412 | 20.3 | +4.2 |
| Conservative | Nicola Riley | 353 | 17.4 | −2.0 |
| Conservative | Jennifer Estensen | 308 | 15.2 | +1.4 |
| Conservative | Graeme Iceton | 281 | 13.9 | +1.7 |
| Turnout | | 2,026 | 37.4 | +0.3 |
| Liberal Democrats hold | | Swing | | |
| Liberal Democrats hold | | Swing | | |
| Liberal Democrats hold | | Swing | | |

=== Teesville ===
Teesville
| Party | Candidate | Votes | % | ±% |
|---|---|---|---|---|
| Labour | Peter Chaney | 597 | 40.6 | +3.1 |
| Labour | Robert Clark* | 576 | 39.2 | +5.1 |
| Labour | Margaret O'Donoghue | 457 | 31.1 | +0.3 |
| Conservative | Steve Cargill | 425 | 28.9 | +19.6 |
| Conservative | Lynne Blackburn | 412 | 28.0 | N/A |
| Conservative | Claire Cargill | 394 | 26.8 | N/A |
| Independent | Ann Higgins | 319 | 21.7 | N/A |
| Independent | Vincent Smith* | 281 | 19.1 | −20.9 |
| Independent | Jim Higgins | 250 | 17.0 | N/A |
| Independent | Pat Turner | 186 | 12.7 | N/A |
| Independent | David Fisher* | 160 | 10.9 | |
| Liberal Democrats | Charlotte Lax-Keeler | 37 | 2.5 | |
| Turnout | | 1,471 | 29.9 | −3.5 |
| Labour hold | | Swing | | |
| Labour gain from Independent | | Swing | | |
| Labour gain from Independent | | Swing | | |

=== West Dyke ===
West Dyke
| Party | Candidate | Votes | % | ±% |
|---|---|---|---|---|
| Liberal Democrats | Chris Jones* | 705 | 46.4 | −7.5 |
| Liberal Democrats | Mary Ovens* | 695 | 45.7 | −10.0 |
| Liberal Democrats | Malcolm Head* | 691 | 45.5 | −8.3 |
| Labour | Ashleigh Atkinson | 444 | 29.2 | +8.7 |
| Labour | Mark Dixon | 439 | 28.9 | +7.3 |
| Labour | Neil Dooley | 407 | 26.8 | +6.9 |
| Conservative | Jacob Phillips | 349 | 23.0 | +8.0 |
| Conservative | Karen Charlton | 342 | 22.5 | +8.0 |
| Conservative | Mark Maddison | 333 | 21.9 | N/A |
| Turnout | | 1,528 | 31.4 | −4.3 |
| Liberal Democrats hold | | Swing | | |
| Liberal Democrats hold | | Swing | | |
| Liberal Democrats hold | | Swing | | |

=== Wheatlands ===
Wheatlands
| Party | Candidate | Votes | % | ±% |
|---|---|---|---|---|
| Conservative | Niall Hargreaves | 448 | 40.4 | +5.1 |
| Conservative | Jack Symon | 399 | 36.0 | +1.6 |
| Liberal Democrats | Yvonne Lax-Keeler* | 363 | 32.8 | −7.5 |
| Liberal Democrats | Shaun Moody* | 336 | 30.3 | −8.6 |
| Labour | Daniel Sillett | 265 | 23.9 | +2.2 |
| Labour | Dave Wimble | 261 | 23.6 | +2.4 |
| Independent | Steve Peacock | 80 | 7.2 | N/A |
| Turnout | | 1,113 | 28.9 | +2.1 |
| Conservative gain from Liberal Democrats | | Swing | | |
| Conservative gain from Liberal Democrats | | Swing | | |

=== Zetland ===
Zetland
| Party | Candidate | Votes | % | ±% |
|---|---|---|---|---|
| Labour | Jade Lavan | 525 | 47.5 | +16.8 |
| Labour | Jonny Neal | 494 | 44.7 | +16.4 |
| Liberal Democrats | Alison Barnes* | 396 | 35.8 | −16.1 |
| Liberal Democrats | Louise Westbury* | 356 | 32.2 | −21.6 |
| Conservative | Richard Gibson | 201 | 18.2 | +2.1 |
| Conservative | William Pugsley | 185 | 16.7 | N/A |
| Turnout | | 1,113 | 33.1 | −1.8 |
| Labour gain from Liberal Democrats | | Swing | | |
| Labour gain from Liberal Democrats | | Swing | | |

== Post-election ==
=== Affiliation changes ===
Vera Rider, elected as an independent in May 2023 (having previously been elected as a Conservative in 2019 but left the party in 2021), re-joined the Conservatives in November 2023.

Tristan Learoyd resigned from the Liberal Democrats in July 2024, following his suspension by the local party. Learoyd previously represented both Labour (2011) and Green (2014), as well as being part of the Independent Group during the 2011-2015 council, and became independent for the third time.

Following his election as Member of Parliament (MP) for Middlesbrough South and East Cleveland in 2024, Luke Myer vacated his councillor seat in the Longbeck ward. A subsequent election on September 5 saw the Conservative Party candidate Stephen Crane win the seat.

In January 2025, Justin Thompson was suspended by the Conservative Party following comments around the Gaza War

=== By-elections ===
==== Skelton East ====
Skelton East by-election: 9 October 2025
| Party | Candidate | Votes | % | ±% |
|---|---|---|---|---|
| Reform | Craig Holmes | 839 | 65.3 | N/A |
| Labour | Norman MacLeod | 247 | 19.2 | –12.6 |
| Conservative | Julie Craig | 179 | 13.9 | –28.3 |
| Liberal Democrats | Stuart Saunders | 19 | 1.5 | –1.4 |
| Majority | | 592 | 46.1 | N/A |
| Turnout | | 1,284 | | |
| Reform gain from Conservative | | | | |

==== South Bank ====
South Bank by-election: 20 November 2025
| Party | Candidate | Votes | % | ±% |
|---|---|---|---|---|
| Labour | Susan Jeffrey | 368 | 47.4 | −20.1 |
| Reform | Adam Jones | 344 | 44.3 | N/A |
| Conservative | Richard Kerr-Morgan | 64 | 8.2 | −4.7 |
| Turnout | | 777 | 20 | −4 |
| Registered electors | | | | |
| Labour hold | | Swing | | |

==== Zetland ====
- Michael Manning was selected as the candidate for Reform UK, but was suspended from the party during the election campaign due to past social media activity.

Zetland by-election: 19 February 2026
| Party | Candidate | Votes | % | ±% |
|---|---|---|---|---|
| Liberal Democrats | Alison Barnes | 446 | 50.5 | ▲14.7 |
| Labour | Mitchell Rynn | 191 | 21.6 | ▼23.1 |
| Independent | Michael Manning | 119 | 13.5 | N/A |
| Green | Brian Teasdale | 65 | 7.4 | N/A |
| Conservative | Igraine Gray | 62 | 7 | ▼11.2 |
| Turnout | | 883 | 26% | ▼7.1 |
| Liberal Democrats gain from Labour | | Swing | | |

The by-election was caused by the resignation of Labour councillor Jonny Neal on 22 December 2025.

==== Hutton ====
Hutton by-election: 10 December 2026
| Party | Candidate | Votes | % | ±% |
|---|---|---|---|---|
| Conservative | Nick Fardon | | | |
| Reform | Shankar Katekhaye | | | |
| Independent | Robin King | | | |
| Restore | Kate Mann | | | |
| Labour | Alison Suthers | | | |
| Liberal Democrats | Don Thynne | | | |
| Majority | | | | |
| Turnout | | | | |
| | | Swing | | |
