= Garth Houchen =

British mayor (1930–2021)

Mayor of Redcar & Cleveland
- In office 1998–1999
- Preceded by: Kath McBride
- Succeeded by: Mike Stephen

Personal details
- Born: September 1930
- Died: April 2021 (age 90)
- Political party: Labour

Garth Houchen (September 1930 – 10 April 2021) was a British Labour Party politician who served as the 3rd Mayor of Redcar & Cleveland from 1998 to 1999. He was the 69th mayor of the borough.

During his tenure as mayor, he campaigned for a new bridge in the village of Marske-by-the-Sea, and served as a trustee for the Tees Heritage Trust.

== See also ==
- Redcar and Cleveland Borough Council
