= William de Wiveleslie Abney =

English astronomer, chemist and photographer

Sir William de Wiveleslie Abney KCB FRS FRSE
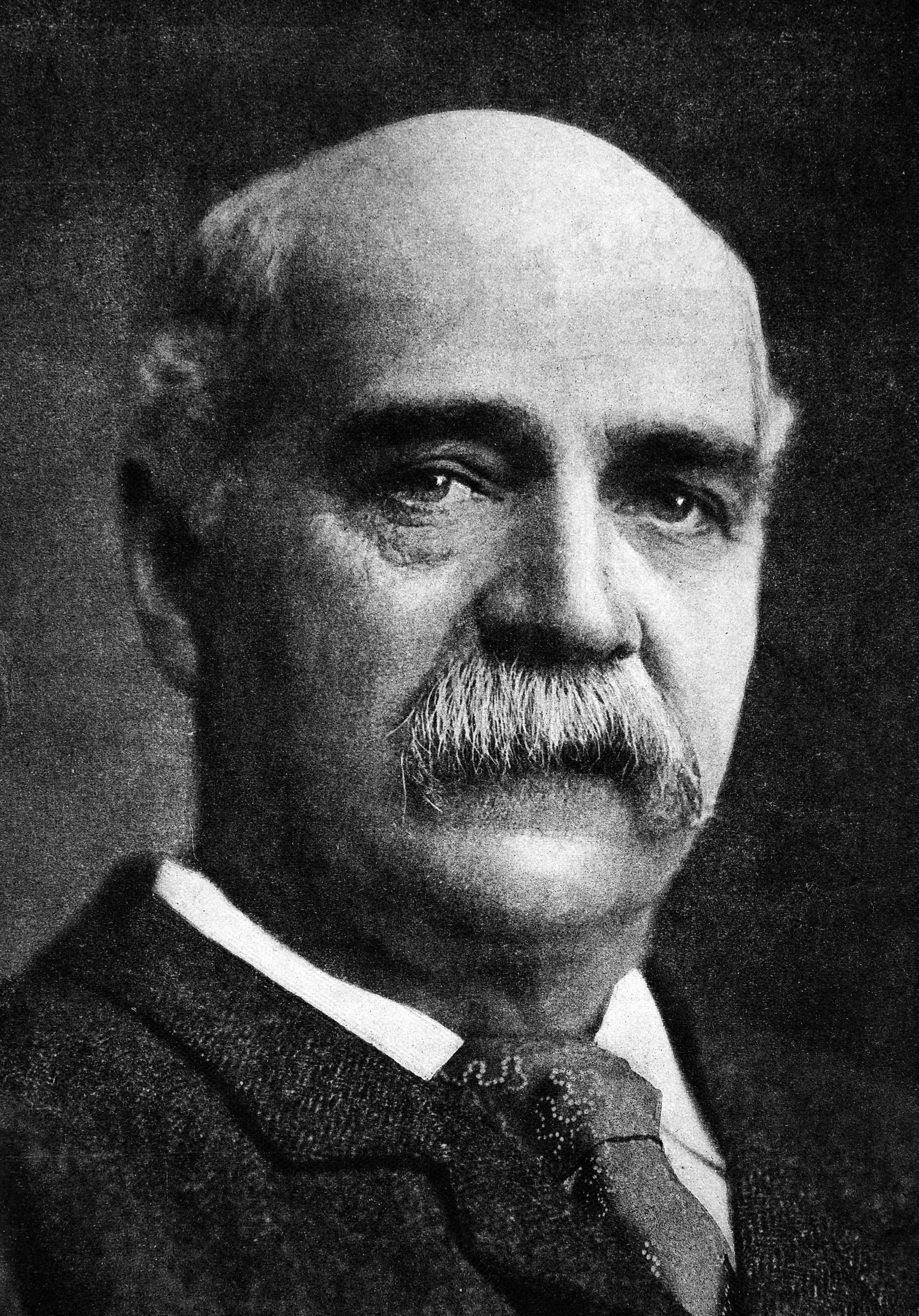
- William de Wiveleslie Abney
- Born: 24 July 1843; Derby, England
- Died: 3 December 1920 (aged 77); Folkestone, England
- Known for: Photography
- Awards: Rumford Medal (1882)
- Scientific career
- Fields: Astronomy; Chemistry; Photography

Sir William de Wiveleslie Abney KCB FRS FRSE (24 July 1843 – 3 December 1920) was an English astronomer, chemist, and photographer. In his early career as a military engineer, he worked with the Royal Engineers in India and then taught at the Chatham School of Military Engineering. He developed the eponymous Abney level used in surveying.

== Life and career ==
Abney was born in Derby, England, the son of Rev. Edward Henry Abney (1811–1892), vicar of St Alkmund's Church, Derby, and his wife, Catharine Strutt. His father was owner of the Firs Estate. William was educated at Rossall School, the Royal Military Academy, Woolwich, and joined the Royal Engineers in 1861, with which he served in India for several years. In 1870 he became an instructor in telegraphy at the Chatham School of Military Engineering. He also worked on photography and offered instruction on the topic to officers. While working here he invented the "Abney level", a combined clinometer and spirit level, used by surveyors to measure slopes and angles. He was responsible for the "Abney mounting" of a concave grating spectrograph in which the photographic plate was fixed and the entry slit moved to accommodate different regions of the spectrum. In 1877 he moved from Chatham to the Science and Art Department, South Kensington, under Sir John Donnelly. He retired with the rank of captain in 1881. From 1899 to 1903 he served as a secretary in the Board of Education, later serving as an advisor.

Abney was a pioneer of several technical aspects of photography. His father had been an early photographic experimenter and friend of Richard Keene, an early Derby photographer. Keene became a close friend of William and his brother Charles Edward Abney (1850–1914). Both Abney sons subsequently became founder members of the Derby Photographic Society in June 1884. His endeavors in the chemistry of photography produced useful photographic products and also developments in astronomy. He wrote many books on photography that were considered standard texts at the time, although he was doubtful that his improvements would have a great impact on the subject.

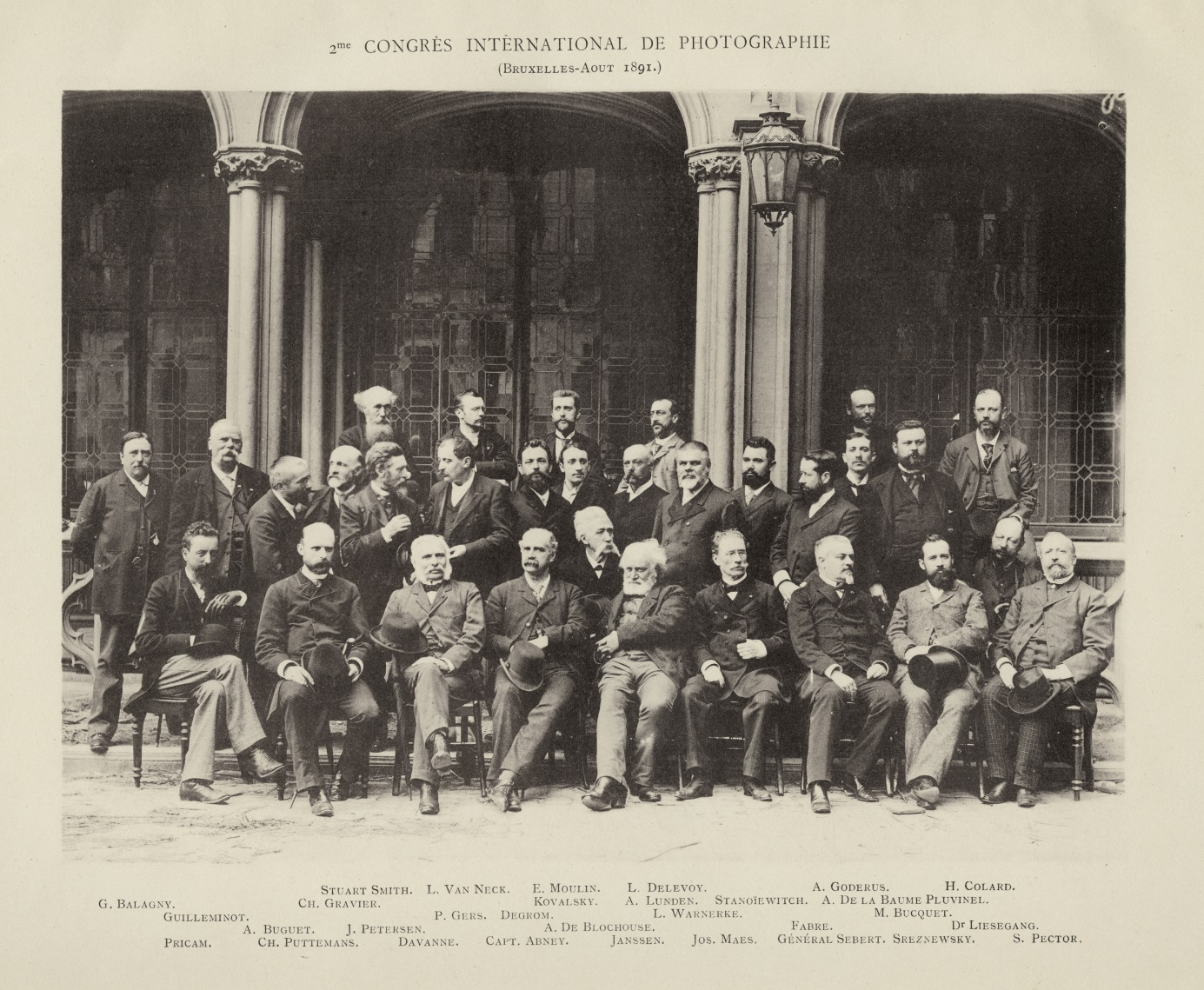
Abney (seated fourth from lef) at the International Photography Congress, 1891

Abney investigated the blackening of a negative to incidental light. In 1874, Abney developed a dry photographic emulsion, which replaced "wet" emulsions. He used this emulsion in an Egyptian expedition to photograph the transit of Venus across the sun. In 1880, he introduced hydroquinone. Abney also introduced new and useful types of photographic paper, including in 1882 a formula for gelatin silver chloride paper. He was elected a Fellow of the Royal Society in 1876.

Abney conducted early research into the field of spectroscopy, developing a red-sensitive emulsion which was used for the infrared spectra of organic molecules. He was also a pioneer in photographing the infrared solar spectrum (1887), as well as researching sunlight in the medium of the atmosphere.

In 1893 he inherited Meashan Hall from a rich aunt.

He became assistant secretary to the Board of Education in 1899 and advisor to that body in 1903. In 1900 he was Director of the Science and Art Department. He was knighted in the same year. He sold his father's estate, most of which went for housing in the St Luke's Parish of Derby, but retained 11 acres until 1913 when they were purchased by the Council to become the site of Rykneld Secondary Modern School and Rykneld recreation ground.

He died on 3 December 1920 in Folkestone, England. He is buried in the churchyard of Holy Trinity Church in Folkestone.

== Family ==
He had married twice: firstly in 1864 to Agnes Matilda Smith (died 1888) with whom he had a son and two daughters, and secondly in 1890 to Mary Louisa Mead with whom he had a further daughter.

== Publications ==
- Chemistry for Engineers, 1870.
- Thebes and its five greater temples, London, published by Sampson Low, Marston, Searle & Rivington, 1876.
- W. de W. Abney, Instruction in Photography, London, published by S. Low, Marston & company, 1900.
- A New Developer, The Photographic News, 1880, 24:345-346.
- W. de W. Abney and E. R. Festing, Intensity of Radiation through Turbid Media, Proceedings of the Royal Society of London, Volume 40, pages 378–380, 1886. Published by The Royal Society.
- W. de W. Abney and E. R. Festing, Colour Photometry. Part III.Proceedings of the Royal Society of London, Volume 50, pages 369–372, 1891–1892. Published by The Royal Society.

== Organizations and honours ==
- 1876 Fellow of the Royal Society
- 1878 Received first Progress Medal of the Photographic Society of Great Britain ever
- 1885 Fellow of the Royal Society of Edinburgh
- 1892 Elected to membership of the Manchester Literary and Philosophical Society on 26 April 1892
- 1892 to 1894, 1896 and 1903 to 1905 President of the Photographic Society of Great Britain aka Royal Photographic Society
- 1893 to 1895 President of the Royal Astronomical Society
- 1895 to 1897 President of the Physical Society of London
- CB : Companion of the Order of the Bath
- KCB: Knight Commander (civil division) of the Order of the Bath (KCB) - announced in the 1900 New Year Honours honours list on 1 January 1900, gazetted on 16 January 1900, and invested by Queen Victoria at Windsor Castle on 1 March 1900.
- Doctor of Science (D.Sc. Honoris causa) from the University of Dublin - June 1903.
- 1909 to 1920 vice-president of Girls' Public Day School Trust

== See also ==
- Abney effect
