= Middlesbrough South and East Cleveland =

UK Parliament constituency (since 1997)

Coordinates: 54.53°N 1°W

- County constituency for the House of Commons
- Interactive map of boundaries since 2024
- Location within North East England
- County: North Yorkshire (area formerly in the county of Cleveland; and Tees Valley combined authority currently)
- Electorate: 69,967 (March 2020)
- Major settlements: Middlesbrough (part), Guisborough, Marton, Loftus

Current constituency
- Created: 1997
- Member of Parliament: Luke Myer (Labour)
- Seats: One
- Created from: Langbaurgh

Middlesbrough South and East Cleveland is a constituency (Note: A county constituency (for the purposes of election expenses and type of returning officer)) created in 1997 represented in the House of Commons of the UK Parliament since 2024 by Luke Myer of the Labour Party. (Note: As with all constituencies, the constituency elects one Member of Parliament (MP) by the first past the post system of election at least every five years.)

== Constituency profile ==
Middlesbrough South and East Cleveland is a constituency in the Teesside area of North Yorkshire. It covers the southern suburbs of the town of Middlesbrough (Stainton, Hemlington, Coulby Newham, Marton, Nunthorpe and part of Ormesby) and the eastern part of the region of Cleveland, which includes the towns of Guisborough, Skelton-in-Cleveland and Loftus and the village of Brotton.

Middlesbrough is a large port town. It was a small settlement until the 1830s when it was selected as the location for an industrial port to ship the region's coal production. It rapidly grew to become a major centre for iron manufacturing and was nicknamed Ironopolis. Middlesbrough's southern suburbs were rural villages until the late 20th century when the town's expansion brought them into its urban area. The towns in Cleveland are historic market towns that grew mostly to house iron miners who worked in the nearby North York Moors. Guisborough, Marton and Nunthorpe are generally affluent whilst the rest of the constituency has high levels of deprivation, giving the constituency an overall average level of wealth. The average house price is lower than the national average but similar to the rest of North East England.

There is a large retiree population in the Cleveland area, giving the constituency a high average age. Residents have average levels of education and homeownership, and rates of household income and child poverty are in line with the rest of the region. A high proportion of residents work in the health, retail and education sectors, and the unemployment rate is similar to the rest of the country. White people made up 96% of the population at the 2021 census.

The constituency is politically mixed at the local borough council level. The wealthier Middlesbrough suburbs elected Liberal Democrat and independent representatives, whilst the more deprived areas are represented by Labour Party and Conservative councillors. In Cleveland, there was Labour Party support in Guisborough and Skelton-in-Cleveland whilst the more rural east elected mostly independents. Voters in Middlesbrough South and East Cleveland strongly supported leaving the European Union in the 2016 referendum; an estimated 65% voted in favour of Brexit compared to the nationwide figure of 52%.

== Boundaries ==
=== Historic ===
==== 1997–2010 ====
- The Redcar and Cleveland Borough Council wards of: Belmont; Brotton; Guisborough; Hutton; Lockwood and Skinningrove; Loftus; Saltburn; and Skelton.
- The Middlesbrough Borough Council wards of: Easterside; Hemlington; Marton; Newham; Nunthorpe; Park End; and Stainton and Thornton.

==== 2010–2024 ====
- The Borough of Redcar and Cleveland wards of: Brotton; Guisborough; Hutton; Lockwood; Loftus; Saltburn; Skelton; and Westworth.
- The Borough of Middlesbrough wards of: Coulby Newham; Hemlington; Ladgate; Marton; Marton West; Nunthorpe; Park End; and Stainton and Thornton.

=== Current ===
Further to the 2023 review of Westminster constituencies, which came into effect for the 2024 general election, the composition of the constituency is as follows (as they existed on 1 December 2020):

- The Borough of Redcar and Cleveland wards of: Belmont; Brotton; Guisborough; Hutton; Lockwood; Loftus; Skelton East; and Skelton West.
- The Borough of Middlesbrough wards of: Coulby Newham; Hemlington; Ladgate; Marton East; Marton West; Nunthorpe; Park End & Beckfield; and Stainton & Thornton.

The boundaries within the Borough of Middlesbrough were aligned to new ward boundaries; in Redcar and Cleveland, the town of Saltburn-by-the-Sea was transferred to the Redcar constituency.

The constituency was created in 1997, mostly replacing the former seat of Langbaurgh and consists of the southern outskirts of Middlesbrough (such as Hemlington, Nunthorpe, Coulby Newham, Marton, Easterside and Park End) and those parts of the Redcar and Cleveland district not in the Redcar constituency. These include Guisborough, Loftus, Skelton and Brotton.

== History ==
Summary of results

This seat was created in 1997 and was held until 2017 by a representative of the Labour Party. Election results have to date been considerably more close than in the overwhelmingly urban, city seat of Middlesbrough, this instead being a marginal seat, particularly the 2010, 2015 and 2017 results which saw no absolute majority unlike the previous three absolute majorities won by Ashok Kumar of the Labour Party. In the five elections from 1997 to 2015, the second-positioned candidate was a Conservative. The 2015 result gave the seat the 20th-smallest majority of Labour's 232 seats by percentage of majority. At the 2017 general election, the seat was gained by Simon Clarke of the Conservative Party on a 3.6% swing, one of the six seats in England gained by the Conservatives at that election.

Third-placed parties

In each election to date the fourth-placed and lower candidates have failed to reach 5% of the vote, therefore forfeiting their deposits. In 2015 the third-placed party in line with national trends changed from the Liberal Democrats to UKIP on large swings; candidates from the third-placed parties in this area have always kept their deposit except in the 2017 and 2019 elections.

Turnout

Turnout has varied from 76% in 1997 to just over 60% in 2005.

== Members of Parliament ==
Langbaurgh prior to 1997

Election	Member	Party	Notes
1997	Ashok Kumar	Labour	Died in office March 2010; no by-election held due to impending general election
2010	Tom Blenkinsop	Labour	
2017	Simon Clarke	Conservative	Chief Secretary to the Treasury 2021-2022; Secretary of State for Housing September-October 2022
2024	Luke Myer	Labour	

== Elections ==
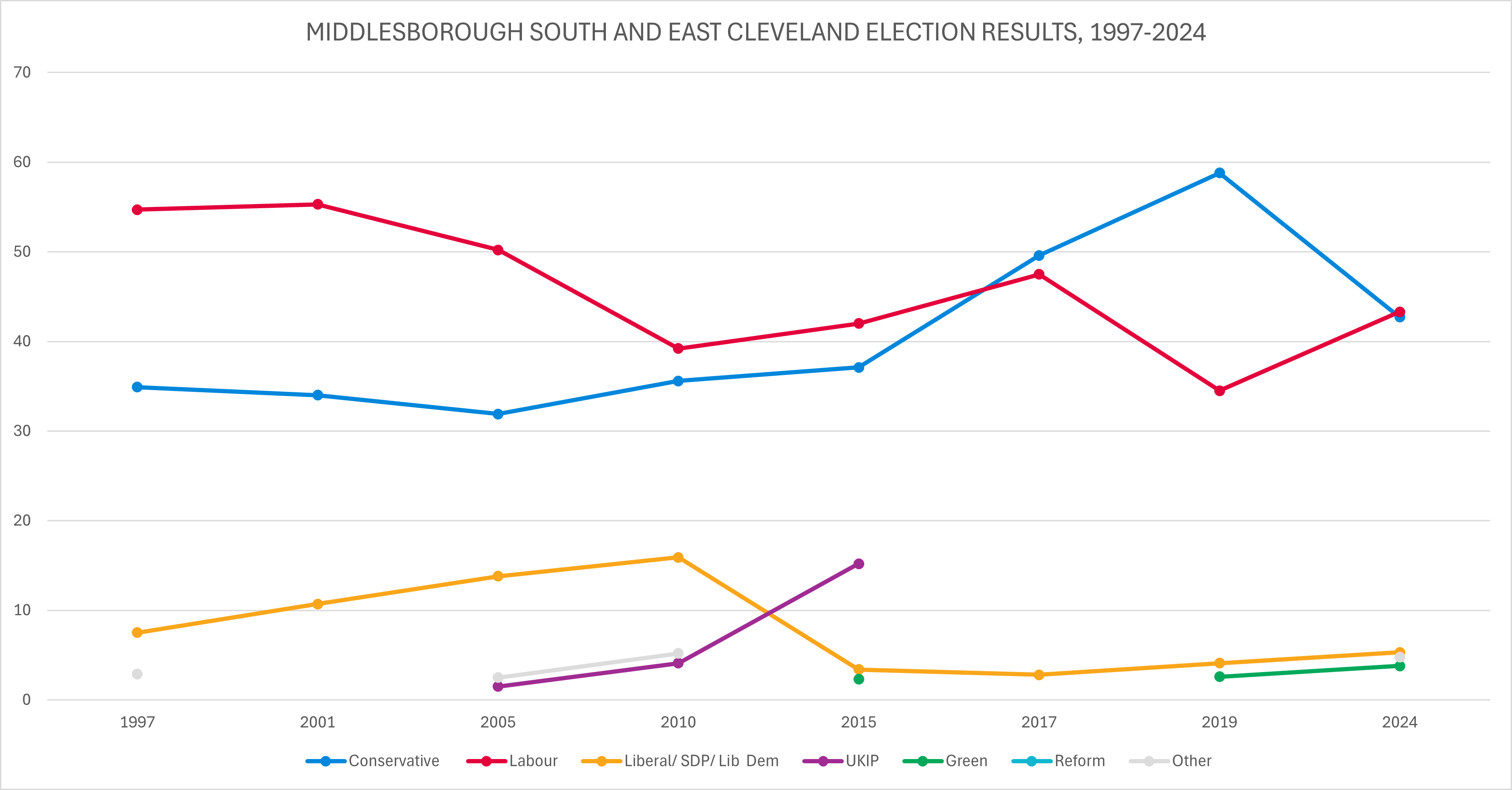
Election results 1997-2024

=== Elections in the 2020s ===
General election 2024: Middlesbrough South and East Cleveland
Party	Candidate	Votes	%	±%
Labour	Luke Myer	16,468	43.3	+8.3
Conservative	Simon Clarke	16,254	42.7	−15.2
Liberal Democrats	Jemma Joy	2,032	5.3	+1.3
SDP	Rod Liddle	1,835	4.8	N/A
Green	Rowan McLaughlin	1,446	3.8	+1.6
Majority		214	0.6	N/A
Turnout		38,035	54.1	
Labour gain from Conservative		Swing	+11.7	

=== Elections in the 2010s ===
General election 2019: Middlesbrough South and East Cleveland
Party	Candidate	Votes	%	±%
Conservative	Simon Clarke	28,135	58.8	+9.2
Labour	Lauren Dingsdale (Note: Also known as Lauren de Thibault de Boesinghe.)	16,509	34.5	−13.0
Liberal Democrats	Jemma Joy	1,953	4.1	+1.3
Green	Sophie Brown	1,220	2.6	N/A
Majority		11,626	24.3	+22.2
Turnout		47,817	66.1	+0.3
Conservative hold		Swing	+11.1	

General election 2017: Middlesbrough South and East Cleveland
Party	Candidate	Votes	%	±%
Conservative	Simon Clarke	23,643	49.6	+12.5
Labour	Tracy Harvey	22,623	47.5	+5.5
Liberal Democrats	Chris Foote Wood	1,354	2.8	−0.6
Majority		1,020	2.1	N/A
Turnout		47,620	65.8	+1.6
Conservative gain from Labour		Swing	+3.6	

General election 2015: Middlesbrough South and East Cleveland
Party	Candidate	Votes	%	±%
Labour	Tom Blenkinsop	19,193	42.0	+2.8
Conservative	Will Goodhand	16,925	37.1	+1.5
UKIP	Steve Turner	6,935	15.2	+11.1
Liberal Democrats	Ben Gibson	1,564	3.4	−12.5
Green	Martin Brampton	1,060	2.3	N/A
Majority		2,268	4.9	+1.3
Turnout		45,677	64.2	+0.6
Labour hold		Swing	+0.7	

General election 2010: Middlesbrough South and East Cleveland
Party	Candidate	Votes	%
Labour	Tom Blenkinsop	18,138	39.2
Conservative	Paul Bristow	16,461	35.6
Liberal Democrats	Nick Emmerson	7,340	15.9
UKIP	Stuart Lightwing	1,881	4.1
BNP	Shaun Gatley	1,576	3.4
Independent	Mike Allen	818	1.8
Majority		1,677	3.6
Turnout		46,214	63.6
Labour win (new boundaries)			

=== Elections in the 2000s ===
General election 2005: Middlesbrough South and East Cleveland
Party	Candidate	Votes	%	±%
Labour	Ashok Kumar	21,945	50.2	−5.1
Conservative	Mark Brooks	13,945	31.9	−2.1
Liberal Democrats	Carl Minns	6,049	13.8	+3.1
BNP	Geoffrey Groves	1,099	2.5	N/A
UKIP	Charlotte Bull	658	1.5	N/A
Majority		8,000	18.3	−3.0
Turnout		43,696	60.8	−0.2
Labour hold		Swing	-1.5	

General election 2001: Middlesbrough South and East Cleveland
Party	Candidate	Votes	%	±%
Labour	Ashok Kumar	24,321	55.3	+0.6
Conservative	Barbara Harpham	14,970	34.0	−0.9
Liberal Democrats	Linda Parrish	4,700	10.7	+3.2
Majority		9,351	21.3	+1.5
Turnout		43,991	61.0	−15.0
Labour hold		Swing		

=== Elections in the 1990s ===
General election 1997: Middlesbrough South and East Cleveland
Party	Candidate	Votes	%
Labour	Ashok Kumar	29,319	54.7
Conservative	Michael Bates	18,712	34.9
Liberal Democrats	Hamish Garrett	4,004	7.5
Referendum	Robin Batchelor	1,552	2.9
Majority		10,607	19.8
Turnout		53,587	76.0
Labour win (new seat)			

== See also ==
- List of parliamentary constituencies in Cleveland
- History of parliamentary constituencies and boundaries in Cleveland
- List of parliamentary constituencies in North East England (region)
