= Heathfield Senior High School =

Address
- Durham Road; Gateshead, Tyne and Wear; England

Information
- Type: State Coeducational Secondary
- Gender: Mixed

Heathfield Senior High School was a secondary school in Gateshead, Tyne and Wear, United Kingdom. OriginalIy opened as part of an expanded Grammar School system for Gateshead, the School became a comprehensive in 1967. The School taught pupils from 14-18. Located in the suburb of Low Fell, the school was set in grounds close to Saltwell Park. It closed in September 1996.

Effectively, Heathfield was merged with feeder school Breckenbeds Junior High School (for 11-14 year olds) to create a new 11-18 school Joseph Swan (since 2019 Grace College) on the former Breckenbeds site on Saltwell Road South.

Following closure, the land was used for housing.

In addition to some notable footballers the school won the English Schools FA Cup in 1985.

== Notable pupils ==
- Neil Aspin (footballer)
- Michael Bates, Baron Bates (peer; former Conservative MP)
- Paul Gascoigne (England footballer)
- Steve Stone (England footballer)
- Michael Sundin (Blue Peter presenter)
- Alan Tomes (Scotland rugby player)
- John Wilson (conductor)
- Chris Wilkie (guitarist)
