= 1973 Langbaurgh Borough Council election =

1973 UK local government election

Elections for Langbaurgh Borough Council took place in May 1973. The entire Langbaurgh Borough Council was up for election as it was the first election since its formation. The Labour Party won the most seats but there was no overall control of the council.

== Election result ==
Langbaurgh Borough Council local election result 1973
Party	Seats	Gains	Losses	Net gain/loss	Seats %	Votes %	Votes	+/−
Labour	32	n/a	n/a	n/a	50%	50.2%	73,077	n/a
Conservative	27	n/a	n/a	n/a	42.2%	38.6%	56,244	n/a
Independent	5	n/a	n/a	n/a	7.8%	11.2%	16,294	n/a
