= Michael Bates, Baron Bates =

British politician (born 1961)

The Right Honourable The Lord Bates PC
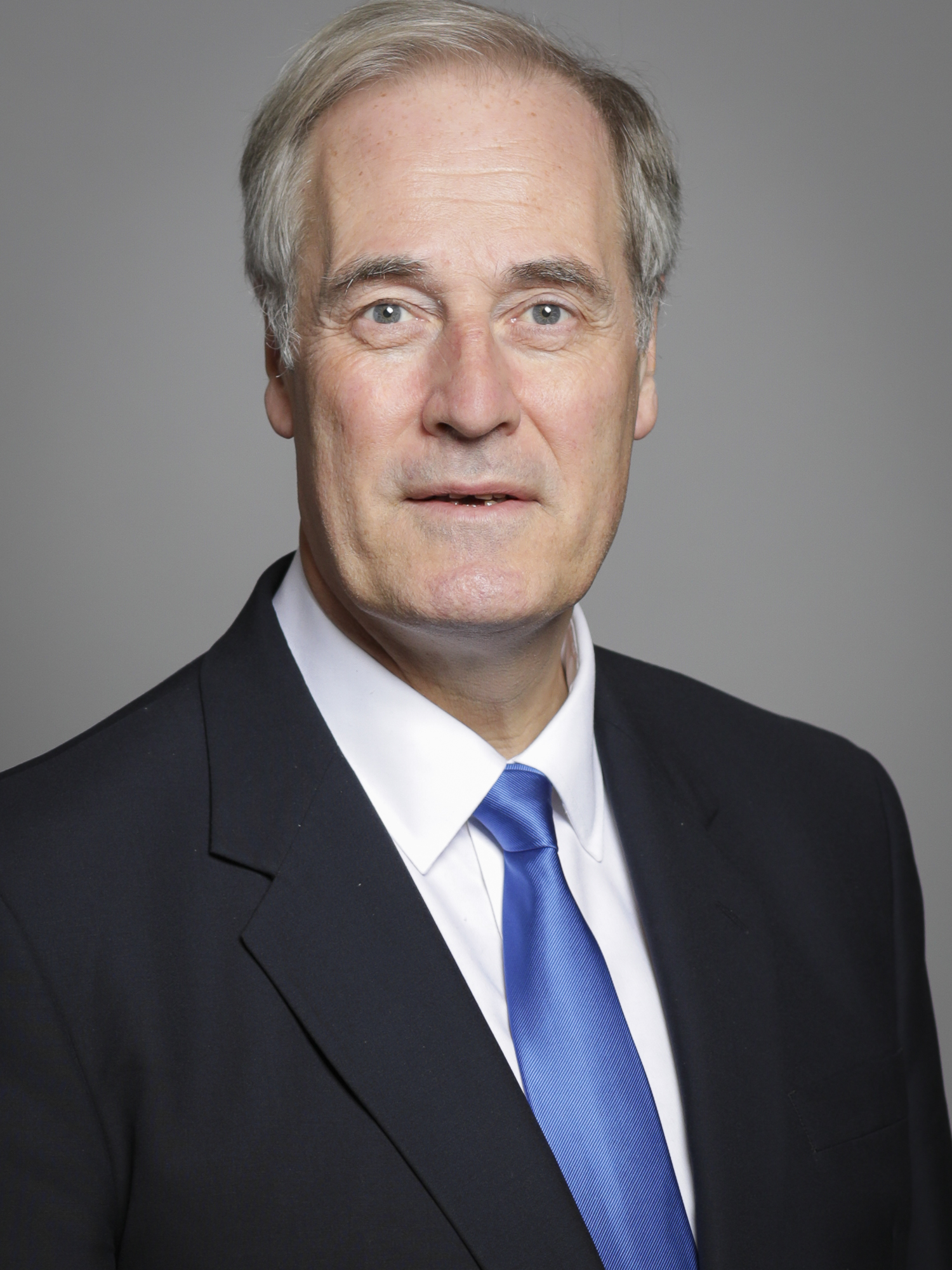
- Official portrait, 2019

Minister of State for International Development
- In office 14 October 2016 – 23 April 2019
- Prime Minister: Theresa May
- Preceded by: The Baroness Anelay of St Johns
- Succeeded by: The Baroness Sugg

Minister of State for Home Affairs
- In office 14 May 2015 – 31 March 2016
- Prime Minister: David Cameron
- Preceded by: Lynne Featherstone
- Succeeded by: The Lord Keen of Elie

Parliamentary Under-Secretary of State for Criminal Information
- In office 6 August 2014 – 14 May 2015
- Prime Minister: David Cameron
- Preceded by: The Lord Taylor of Holbeach
- Succeeded by: The Lord Ahmad of Wimbledon

Lord-in-Waiting Government Whip
- In office 7 October 2013 – 6 August 2014
- Prime Minister: David Cameron
- Preceded by: The Baroness Stowell of Beeston
- Succeeded by: The Lord Ashton of Hyde

Paymaster General
- In office 21 November 1996 – 2 May 1997
- Prime Minister: John Major
- Preceded by: David Willetts
- Succeeded by: Geoffrey Robinson

Lord Commissioner of the Treasury
- In office 17 October 1995 – 11 December 1996
- Prime Minister: John Major
- Preceded by: Andrew MacKay
- Succeeded by: Gyles Brandreth

Member of the House of Lords
- Lord Temporal
- Life peerage 30 June 2008

Member of Parliament for Langbaurgh
- In office 9 April 1992 – 8 April 1997
- Preceded by: Ashok Kumar
- Succeeded by: Constituency abolished, lost to Ashok Kumar in Middlesbrough South and East Cleveland

Personal details
- Born: 26 May 1961 (age 65) Gateshead, England
- Party: Conservative
- Spouses: Carole Whitfield (div. 2008); Xuelin Li (m. 2012)
- Children: 2

Michael Walton Bates, Baron Bates (born 26 May 1961) is a British Conservative Party politician. He has served in the House of Lords since 2008, having previously represented the constituency of Langbaurgh in the House of Commons from 1992 to 1997.

From 2014 to 2015, he was Parliamentary Under-Secretary of State for Criminal Information at the Home Office. In May 2015 he was appointed Minister of State at the Home Office. In March 2016, he resigned as Minister of State in order to undertake a 2000-mile solo walk from Buenos Aires to Rio de Janeiro to raise awareness of the Olympic Truce.

He returned to government as a Minister of State in the Department for International Development in October 2016. He offered his resignation on 31 January 2018 for showing "discourtesy" after arriving one minute late for a debate in the chamber, but it was not accepted by the Prime Minister. In April 2019, Bates submitted his second resignation from the position and vacated his role as Minister of State.

== Early life and education ==
Born in Gateshead in 1961, Bates attended Heathfield Senior High School and Gateshead College. In 1987, he was part of a team who bid successfully for a City Technology College to be located in Gateshead and in 1990, Emmanuel College was formally opened and is one of only three remaining CTCs in England that have not converted into academies. He also has an MBA from Wadham College, Oxford.

== Political career ==
Bates joined the Conservative Party in Gateshead in 1979, later becoming Chairman of Gateshead Conservative Association. He was a founder member of Gateshead Young Conservatives, Chairman of Northern Area Young Conservatives and a member of the National Advisory Committee of the Young Conservatives from 1984 to 1989.

He contested several elections to Gateshead Borough Council for the Conservative Party between 1983 and 1989. At the 1987 general election, he stood for parliament for the first time, contesting the Tyne Bridge parliamentary constituency, which was retained by the Labour Party. Bates contested the November 1991 by-election in Langbaurgh caused by the death of Conservative MP Richard Holt. He lost the election to Labour's Ashok Kumar.

=== House of Commons ===
Five months after his defeat in the by-election, a general election was held. Bates was elected for Langbaurgh, defeating Kumar. Bates was appointed as a Parliamentary Private Secretary to Nicholas Scott, Minister of State at the Department of Social Security, in October 1992. In November 1993, he voted against a government proposal to increase MP's salaries at a time when other public sector employees were receiving no increase, and as a result was forced to resign his junior post in the government as a ministerial aide.

In May 1994, he returned to the government as a Parliamentary Private Secretary to Sir John Wheeler, Minister of State in the Northern Ireland Office, and two months later was appointed to his first full ministerial role as an Assistant Government whip. In 1995, he was promoted to be a Government Whip (Lord Commissioner of the Treasury), and in 1996 was appointed Paymaster General in the Cabinet Office and Sponsor Minister for the North-East of England, posts which he held until May 1997.

=== 1997 to 2008 ===
As the Langbaurgh constituency was abolished for the 1997 general election, Bates was selected as the candidate for the seat of Middlesbrough South and East Cleveland, which contained most of the wards from Langbaurgh, but he lost to Ashok Kumar in the third contest between the two men in less than six years. After losing the election, Bates attended Wadham College, Oxford, and Saïd Business School, graduating from Oxford University in 1998 with a master's degree in Business Administration (MBA). Bates served as a member of SaÏd Business School's Business Advisory Forum from 1999 until 2011.

Between 1998 and 2005, Bates served as Director of Consultancy & Research at Oxford Analytica. Between 2006 and 2008, Bates researched ethics and foreign policy for a doctorate at Durham University's School of Government and International Affairs, and served as a non-resident tutor at St John's College.

=== Campaign North ===
In 2006, Bates was appointed Deputy Chairman of the Conservative Party with specific responsibility for the North of England. He served as a deputy to William Hague in his role as Chairman of the Northern Board of the Conservative Party and Head of Campaign North.

=== House of Lords ===
Bates was awarded a life peerage on 30 June 2008, and was gazetted as Baron Bates, of Langbaurgh in the County of North Yorkshire. Also beginning in 2008, he served as director of the Emmanuel Schools Foundation and a director of Bede Academy, Blyth; Trinity Academy, Thorne and The King's Academy, Middlesbrough, holding these posts until 2010.

In December 2008, he was appointed an Opposition Whip in the House of Lords, and Shadow Minister for the Cabinet Office and Energy & Climate Change. In March 2009, he became Shadow Minister for Communities & Local Government, and in January 2010 Shadow Minister for Children, Schools & Families.

In 2013, Lord Bates was appointed a Deputy Chairman and Deputy Speaker of the House of Lords.

In October 2013, he became a Government Whip (a Lord in Waiting in the Royal Household) and a Government Spokesman in the House of Lords, for the Departments of Work & Pensions; International Development; Culture Media and Sport (Broadcasting); and Business Innovation and Skills (Universities & Science).

On 6 August 2014, following the resignation of Baroness Warsi, Lord Bates succeeded Lord Taylor of Holbeach as Parliamentary Under Secretary of State for Criminal Information at the Home Office. He was promoted to Minister of State at the Home Office in May 2015 and sworn of the Privy Council.

On 23 March 2016, Lord Bates resigned from the Home Office in order to walk 2000 miles from Buenos Aires to Rio de Janeiro to promote the Olympic Truce and raised over £260,000 for UNICEF.

In October 2016, he was appointed Minister of State at the Department for International Development. On 31 January 2018, he offered his resignation after arriving a minute too late for a question from Baroness Lister of Burtersett in the House of Lords, which had sat early that day. Lord Bates said that he was "thoroughly ashamed at not being in [his] place", but his resignation surprised the House. Baroness Smith of Basildon, Labour leader in the Lords, said that an apology was all that was needed, and Prime Minister Theresa May refused Lord Bates' resignation.

Lord Bates successfully resigned his office of Minister of State in April 2019.

== Charity work ==
In 2009, Bates was appointed Patron of Tomorrow's People (North East) a charity specialising in getting 'hard to reach' young people into work or training. Bates undertook two sponsored walks called 'Walk for Tomorrow' for them in 2009 and 2010, raising over £25,000. In 2011, he was nominated for a Dods Charity Champion Award by Tomorrow's People and shortlisted.

On 27 July 2013, on the first anniversary of the London Olympic Games, Lord Bates embarked upon a 518.8 mile walk from London to Derry, Northern Ireland, to raise funds for Save the Children's work in Syria. The walk, which took 35 days to complete, raised over £50,000 for the charity's campaign. In 2013 Lord Bates was shortlisted for 'International Campaigner of the Year' in the Dods Parliamentary Awards

On 4 August 2014, Lord Bates embarked on a 1,054 mile/two-month walk from London to Berlin raising £41,000 for the German charity Friedensdorf International (Peace Village International) who provide emergency medical for child victims of conflict.

On 27 July 2015, the third anniversary of the London Olympics, Lord Bates embarked upon a 71-day, 1,059-mile walk from Beijing to Hangzhou. The walk raised £90,000 for projects identified by the Red Cross Society in China.

== Olympic Truce ==
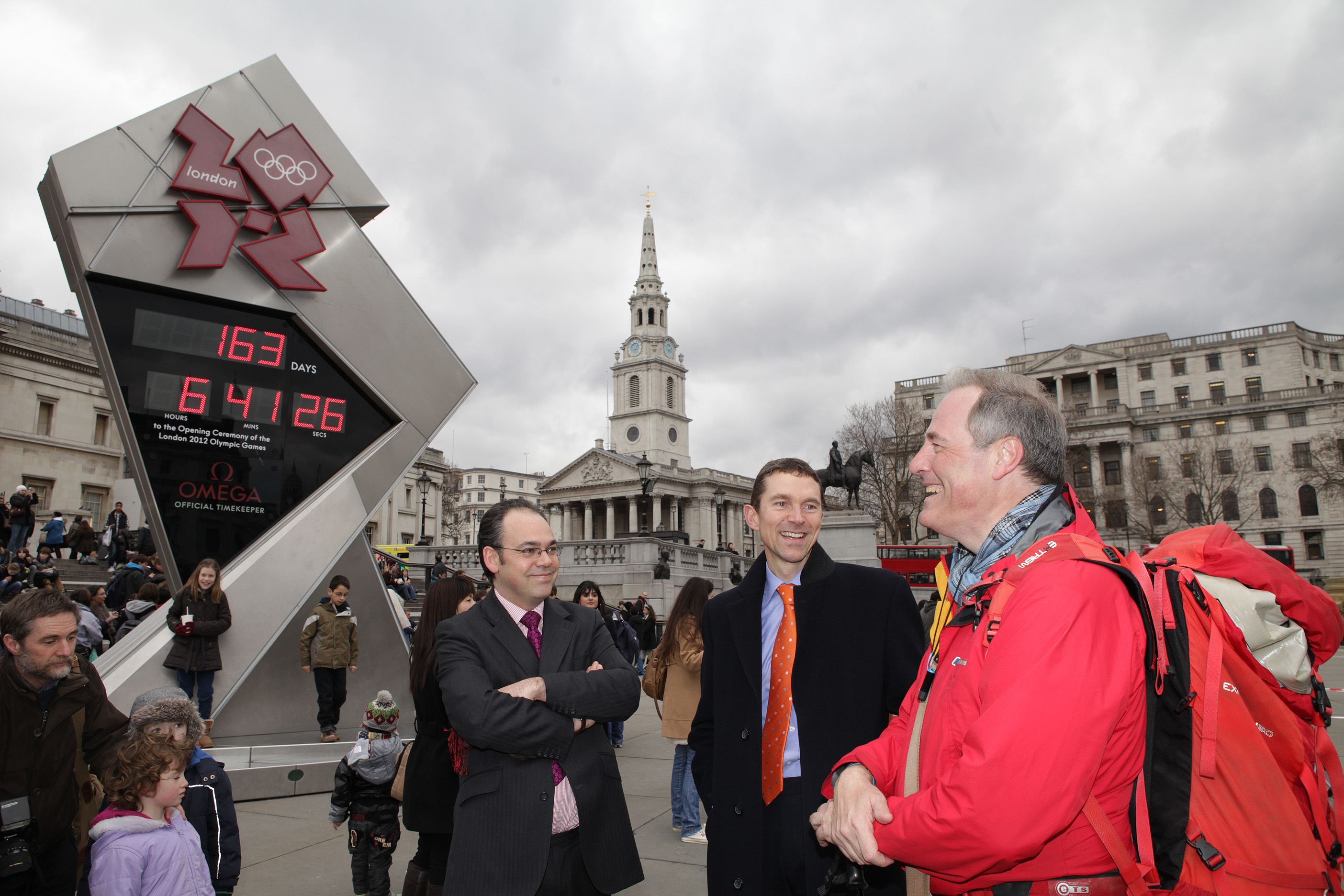
Lord Bates walking into Trafalgar Square, London, after taking nearly six-and-a-half million steps in a 3,000-mile walk across Europe to raise awareness of the UN resolution on the Olympic Truce (2012).

Bates campaigned for the Olympic Truce for the London 2012 Olympic and Paralympic Games to be taken seriously by the signatories to the Olympic Truce Resolution of the United Nations General Assembly. In April 2011, he set out on a 'Walk for Truce' from Olympia in Greece to Westminster, London to raise awareness of the truce and to secure support for its observance at the London 2012 Games. In 2012, Lord Bates received the Open Fields Award from the Olympic Truce Foundation USA for his work in raising awareness for the truce.

On 6 April 2016, the UN International Day of Sport for Development and Peace Lord Bates embarked upon a 2000-mile, 140-day, solo-walk from Buenos Aires (Host city for the 2018 Youth Olympic Games) to Rio de Janeiro, host city for the 2016 Olympic and Paralympic Games. The purpose of the walk, as in 2012, was to raise awareness for the UN Resolution declaring the 2016 Olympic Truce and to raise funds for UNICEF's work with children in danger around the world.

== Personal life ==
Bates married Carole (née Whitfield) in 1983; the couple had two sons, Matthew (born 1987) and Alex (born 1990), but divorced in 2008.

Bates married Xuelin (née Li) in 2012. He currently lives in London and the north-east of England.

== Honours ==
- He was sworn of Her Majesty's Most Honourable Privy Council on 14 May 2015 at Buckingham Palace. This gave him the honorific prefix The Right Honourable and the Post Nominal Letters "PC" for Life.

Parliament of the United Kingdom
Preceded by Ashok Kumar	Member of Parliament for Langbaurgh; 1992 – 1997	Constituency abolished
Political offices
Preceded by David Willetts	Paymaster General; 1996 – 1997	Succeeded by Geoffrey Robinson
Orders of precedence in the United Kingdom
Preceded by The Lord Smith of Kelvin	Gentlemen; Baron Bates	Followed by Peter Mandelson
