= Mary Lanigan =

British politician

Leader of Redcar and Cleveland Council
- In office 12th February 2015 – 28th May 2015
- Preceded by: George Dunning
- Succeeded by: Sue Jeffrey
- In office 23 May 2019 – 25 May 2023
- Preceded by: Sue Jeffrey
- Succeeded by: Alec Brown

Councillor for Loftus Ward
- In office March 2002 – 25th May 2023

Mary Lanigan is a British independent politician who was the leader of Redcar and Cleveland Borough Council from February 2015 until May 2015 and again from May 2019 until May 2023.

Lanigan was first elected as councillor for the Loftus in 2002 after being elected unopposed, a position which she held until her defeat in the 2023 Local Elections. During her time as a councillor, Lanigan also served as a member of the council's Regulatory Committee and its Executive Scrutiny Board, as well as Cabinet Member for Highways, Transportation and Planning.

In March 2023 She was formally censured after breaching Redcar and Cleveland Borough Council's code of conduct. She lost her seat in the subsequent election, after Labour gained one of the three Loftus seats.

== Electoral history ==
Loftus 2003
Party	Candidate	Votes	%	±%
East Cleveland Independent	David Fitzpatrick	1,918		
Labour	Eric Jackson	1,149		
East Cleveland Independent	Mary Lanigan	1,045		
East Cleveland Independent	Stephanie Aplin-Wakefield	969		
Independent	Linda Bell	735		
Labour	Christine Swales	486		
Labour	Roger Clipsham	447		
Conservative	Susan King	282		
Turnout		7,031		

Loftus 2007
Party	Candidate	Votes	%	±%
Independent	Mary Lanigan	1,068		
Labour	Eric Jackson	808		
Loftus Ward Independent	David Fitzpatrick	585		
Independent	Linda Bell	547		
Labour	Allan Greening	529		
Labour	Gerry Dickinson	416		
Independent	Wayne Davies	335		
Loftus Ward Independent	Stephanie Aplin-Wakefield	289		
Loftus Ward Independent	Roger Lings	263		
Conservative	Jennifer Bell	186		
Conservative	Mary Dadd	157		
Turnout		4,713	41.4	
Independent hold		Swing		
Labour hold		Swing		
Independent hold		Swing		

Loftus 2011
Party	Candidate	Votes	%	±%
Labour	Eric Jackson	983	37.9	
East Cleveland Independent	David Fitzpatrick	684	26.4	
Independent	Mary Lanigan	668	25.8	
Independent	Linda Bell	620		
Labour	James McGill	620		
Independent	Alan Greening	517		
Labour	Jim Marvell	429		
Independent	Wayne Davis	404		
Conservative	Mary Dadd	259	10	
Independent hold		Swing		
Labour hold		Swing		
Independent hold		Swing		

Loftus 2015
Party	Candidate	Votes	%	±%
Independent	Mary Lanigan	1438	52.9	
Labour	Eric Jackson	910	33.5	
Independent	Wayne Davis	909		
Independent	Dave Fitzpatrick	846		
Independent	Alan Greening	718		
Labour	Andrew Anderson	673		
Labour	James McGill	625		
Independent	Tony Gatehouse	427		
Conservative	Joe Hayek	372		
Independent hold		Swing		
Labour hold		Swing		
Independent hold		Swing		

Loftus 2019
Party	Candidate	Votes	%	±%
Independent	Wayne Davies	1,126	63.3	
Independent	Mary Lanigan	1,054	59.2	
Independent	Timothy Gray	962	54.0	
Conservative	Anthony Gatehouse	467	26.2	
Conservative	Iain Graham	322	18.1	
Conservative	Janet Dadd	310	17.4	
Labour	Denise Bunn	200	11.2	
Labour	Kate Mann	194	10.9	
Labour	James Bunn	192	10.8	
Turnout		1,780	37.9	
Independent hold		Swing		
Independent hold		Swing		
Independent gain from Labour		Swing		

Loftus 2023
Party	Candidate	Votes	%	±%
Independent	Wayne Davies	570	45.0	−18.3
Labour	Linda White	540	42.6	+31.4
Independent	Timothy Gray	491	38.7	−15.3
Conservative	Allan Greening	453	35.7	+9.5
Independent	Mary Lanigan	405	31.9	−27.3
Conservative	Igraine Gray	313	24.7	+6.6
Labour	Ramin Peroznejad	231	18.2	+7.3
Turnout		1,274	27.6	−10.3
Independent hold		Swing		
Labour gain from Independent		Swing		
Independent hold		Swing		
