= Ashok Kumar (British politician) =

British politician (1956–2010)

Ashok Kumar FIChemE MP

Member of Parliament for Middlesbrough South and East Cleveland
- In office 1 May 1997 – 15 March 2010
- Preceded by: Constituency created
- Succeeded by: Tom Blenkinsop

Member of Parliament for Langbaurgh
- In office 7 November 1991 – 16 March 1992
- Preceded by: Richard Holt
- Succeeded by: Michael Bates

Personal details
- Born: 28 May 1956 Haridwar, Uttar Pradesh, India
- Died: 15 March 2010 (aged 53) Marton, Middlesbrough, England
- Party: Labour
- Education: Aston University
- Profession: Chemical engineer

Ashok Kumar (28 May 1956 – 15 March 2010) was a British Labour politician who served as Member of Parliament (MP) for Middlesbrough South and East Cleveland from 1997 until his sudden death shortly before the 2010 general election.

== Early life ==
Kumar was born in Haridwar, Uttar Pradesh, India, to Jagat Ram Saini and Santosh Kumari, who emigrated to Derby when Kumar was twelve years old. He attended Rykneld Secondary Modern School in Derby and left at the age of fifteen to study for O-Levels at Wilmorton College, before attending Derby & District College of Art & Technology for his A-Levels. He then studied Chemical Engineering at Aston University in Birmingham where he was awarded a BSc in 1978, and an MSc in Process Analysis and Control Theory in 1980, and a PhD in Fluid Mechanics in 1982. The thesis title was Velocity distributions in a plate heat exchanger. He was a Fellow of the Institution of Chemical Engineers, a Chartered Engineer and a Member of the Energy Institute. Kumar was a Research Fellow at Imperial College London (1982–85) and worked as a research scientist for British Steel Corporation in Middlesbrough from 1985-97.

== Political career ==
Kumar began his political career as a local councillor for Middlesbrough Borough Council (1987–97). He became the MP for Langbaurgh at the 1991 Langbaurgh by-election defeating Conservative candidate Michael Bates, but Bates won the seat again at the 1992 general election. Kumar won the successor seat of Middlesbrough South and East Cleveland at the 1997 general election, again defeating Bates, and held it until his death in 2010. Prior to his death, Kumar had been selected to stand again at the 2010 general election.

He was a Member of the Parliamentary and Scientific Committee; Vice-Chair of Parliamentary Group for Energy Studies; Chair of the Parliamentary Office of Science and Technology (POST); and Chair of Northern Group of Labour MPs.

In June 2010, IChemE (the Institution of Chemical Engineers) and NEPIC (the Northeast of England Process Industry Cluster) launched the Ashok Kumar fellowship at POST in memory of Kumar. The annual fellowship will see the successful candidate spend three months at the Parliamentary Office for Science and Technology (POST). By 2017, the sixth Ashok Kumar Fellow had been appointed to work with POST she was a postgraduate engineering student, Erin Johnson, from Imperial College, London.

Kumar was a supporter of industrial engagement and the concepts of economic clusters. He regularly chaired the NEPIC MP/Industry meetings and contributed to the growth and innovation agenda of the Cluster. Tributes for his work came after his untimely death.

== Personal life ==
Ashok Kumar was a Distinguished Supporter of the British Humanist Association. Of Hindu and Sikh descent, he described himself as a lifelong "liberal humanist". Aston University gave him an honorary degree in July 1997.

Kumar never married or had children. He lived in Marton, Middlesbrough.

== Death ==
Kumar was found dead by police in his constituency home in Canberra Road, Marton, on 15 March 2010. Police announced that he had died from natural causes.

Parliament of the United Kingdom
Preceded by Richard Holt	Member of Parliament for Langbaurgh; 1991–1992	Succeeded by Michael Bates
New constituency	Member of Parliament for Middlesbrough South and East Cleveland; 1997–2010	Succeeded by Tom Blenkinsop
