= Langbaurgh (constituency) =

UK Parliament constituency (1983–1997)

- Former county constituency for the House of Commons
- Boundary of Langbaurgh in Cleveland for the 1992 general election

- Location of Cleveland within England
- County: 1983-1996 Cleveland; 1996-1997 North Yorkshire
- Major settlements: Guisborough

1983–1997
- Seats: One
- Created from: Cleveland & Whitby
- Replaced by: Middlesbrough South & East Cleveland

Langbaurgh was a parliamentary constituency in south Middlesbrough and Redcar and Cleveland boroughs, the latter previously named Langbaurgh from 1974 to 1996. It returned one Member of Parliament (MP) to the House of Commons of the Parliament of the United Kingdom, elected by the first past the post system, and existed from 1983 to 1997.

== History ==
The constituency was a mixture of heavy manufacturing areas (41.7% of the workforce), with seaside resort and rural agricultural parts. The political effect was to make the constituency marginal between the Labour and Conservative candidates. However, it was held by the Conservative party at each of the general elections which it existed. A 1991 by-election was the only time at which Labour won this seat.

== Boundaries ==
1983–1997: The Borough of Langbaurgh wards of Belmont, Brotton, Guisborough, Hutton, Lockwood, Loftus, Longbeck, St. Germain's, Saltburn, Skelton, and Skinningrove, and the Borough of Middlesbrough wards of Easterside, Hemlington, Marton, Newham, Nunthorpe, Park End, and Stainton and Thornton.

At the time of its creation the constituency was part of the then non-metropolitan county of Cleveland and the Borough of Langbaurgh, for local government purposes. Before the reforms of local government in the 1960s and 1970s the area that became Cleveland had been partly located in the north of the North Riding of Yorkshire and partially in the south of the historic county of Durham. The constituency itself was located in the North Riding part of Cleveland.

The redistribution of constituencies, which took effect in 1983, was the first which used the reformed local authorities as the building blocks for Parliamentary constituencies. Langbaurgh was a new constituency; 65.1% of it had formerly been part of Cleveland and Whitby constituency, 34.6% came from Middlesbrough and 0.3% from Richmond (Yorks).

In 1996 the county of Cleveland and its associated districts like the borough of Langbaurgh were abolished. The area was divided into unitary council areas, one of which was Middlesbrough and another was Redcar and Cleveland (the former borough of Langbaurgh). In the circumstances it was inevitable that the majority successor constituency to Langbaurgh from 1997 (Middlesbrough South and East Cleveland) was renamed.

== Members of Parliament ==
Election	Member	Party	Notes
1983	Richard Holt	Conservative	Died September 1991
1991 by-election	Ashok Kumar	Labour	Later MP for Middlesbrough South and East Cleveland 1997–2010
1992	Michael Bates	Conservative	Paymaster General 1996–97
1997	constituency abolished: see Middlesbrough South and East Cleveland & Redcar		

== Elections ==
=== Elections in the 1990s ===
The 1992 result is compared to the 1987 general election vote, which was a Conservative win.

General election 1992: Langbaurgh
Party	Candidate	Votes	%	±%
Conservative	Michael Bates	30,018	45.4	+3.7
Labour	Ashok Kumar	28,454	43.1	+4.7
Liberal Democrats	Peter Allen	7,615	11.5	−8.4
Majority		1,564	2.4	−1.0
Turnout		66,087	83.1	+4.3
Conservative hold		Swing	−0.5	

By-election 1991: Langbaurgh
Party	Candidate	Votes	%	±%
Labour	Ashok Kumar	22,442	42.9	+4.5
Conservative	Michael Bates	20,467	39.1	−2.6
Liberal Democrats	Peter Allen	8,421	16.1	−3.8
Green	Gerald Parr	456	0.9	New
Yorkshire Party	Colin Holt	216	0.4	New
Corrective Party	Lindi St Clair	198	0.4	New
Football Supporters	Nigel Downing	163	0.3	New
Majority		1,975	3.8	N/A
Turnout		52,363		
Labour gain from Conservative		Swing	+3.55	

=== Elections in the 1980s ===
General election 1987: Langbaurgh
Party	Candidate	Votes	%	±%
Conservative	Richard Holt	26,047	41.7	0.0
Labour	Paul Harford	23,959	38.4	+7.0
Liberal	Robin Ashby	12,405	19.9	−7.0
Majority		2,088	3.4	−7.0
Turnout		62,411	78.8	+3.8
Conservative hold		Swing	−3.5	

General election 1983: Langbaurgh
Party	Candidate	Votes	%	±%
Conservative	Richard Holt	24,239	41.7	
Labour	Gaye Johnson	18,215	31.4	
Liberal	Robin Ashby	15,615	26.9	
Majority		6,024	10.4	
Turnout		58,069	75.0	
Conservative win (new seat)				

== See also ==
- List of former United Kingdom Parliament constituencies
- History of parliamentary constituencies and boundaries in Cleveland

== Sources ==
- British Parliamentary Constituencies: A Statistical Compendium, by Ivor Crewe and Anthony Fox (Faber & Faber 1984)
