= Topographic Abney level =

Surveying instrument

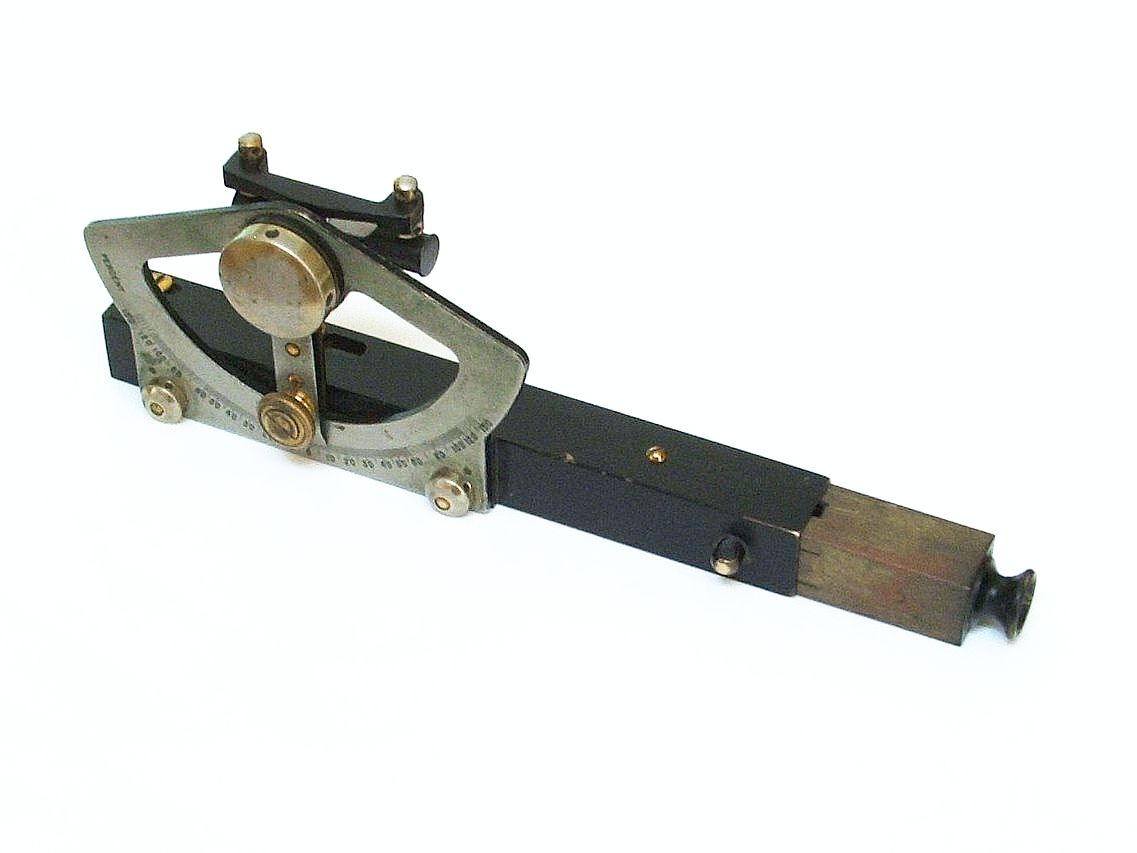
Abney level and clinometer made by Eugene Dietzgen Company of Chicago. The scale is reversible. As shown in the photo, it is set for measuring percent grade. The reverse measures degrees of arc.

An Abney level and clinometer is an instrument used in surveying which consists of a fixed sighting tube, a movable spirit level that is connected to a pointing arm, and a protractor scale. An internal mirror allows the user to see the bubble in the level while sighting a distant target. It can be used as a hand-held instrument or mounted on a Jacob's staff for more precise measurement, and it is small enough to carry in a coat pocket.

The Abney level is an easy to use, relatively inexpensive, and, when used correctly, an accurate surveying tool. Abney levels typically include scales graduated in measure degrees of arc, percent grade, and in topographic Abney levels, grade in feet per surveyor's chain, and chainage correction. The latter is the cosine of the angle, used to convert distances measured along the slope to horizontal distances. By using trigonometry the user of an Abney level can determine height, volume, and grade.

Abney levels are made with square tubular bodies so that they may also be used to directly measure the slopes of plane surfaces by simply placing the body of the level on the surface, adjusting the level, and then reading the angle off of the scale.

== Origins ==
The Abney level was invented by Sir William de Wiveleslie Abney (24 July 1843 – 3 December 1920) who was an English astronomer and chemist best known for his pioneering of color photography and color vision. Abney invented this instrument under the employment of the School of Military Engineering in Chatham, England, prior to late 1870. It is described by W. & L. E. Gurley as an English modification of the Locke hand level.

Elliott Brothers of London registered an "improved clinometer and spirit level combined" in December 1870 based on "the old form as originally designed by Lieutenant Abney."

By 1871, a committee of the Royal Geographical Society recommended a long list of instruments that explorers should carry. Along with necessary tools such as a watch, compass, sextant and plenty of paper, the committee included "a pocket level (Abney's)" in a secondary list of "additional instruments, not necessary, but convenient."

== Usage ==
In 1914 and 1915, the Forestry Quarterly published a series of articles on the use of the Abney level. These tutorial articles remain useful today, but the primary reference for usage is the 1927 Abney Level Handbook.

The Abney level is typically used at the eye height of the surveyor, either hand-held or mounted on a staff at that height. To measure lines on a particular slope, the desired angle or grade is first set on the level and then the surveyor sights through the sighting tube and brings the cross-hair in line with the bubble in the level while viewing the target. This allows the surveyor to see if the target is above or below the line of sight.

To measure an unknown slope, the surveyor first sights a target along that slope and then adjusts the angle of the level until the bubble is centered on the cross-hair. Once this is done, the slope may be read from the scale.

Because the level is typically held at the surveyor's eye-height, it is common to use the face of a second surveyor of similar height as a target. If the second surveyor is not the same height, the approximate location of eye-height must be noted (i.e. chin, nose, top of head). Mounting a face-sized target at eye-height on a level staff may be more accurate. Because most Abney levels do not contain a telescope, direct reading from a level staff is only possible at short range, although it is possible to make special staffs that can be read at a distance without magnification.

== Common uses ==
Abney levels remain in common use in several fields:

- In topographic surveying, to determine slope to horizontal distance calculation, contour tracing and relative heights.
- In forestry, for tree height measurement.
- In mining and mine safety inspection, to measure the grades of haulage roads.
- In geology, in measurements of rock outcrops and fault scarps.
