= Simon Clarke (politician) =

British politician (born 1984)

The Right Honourable Sir Simon Clarke
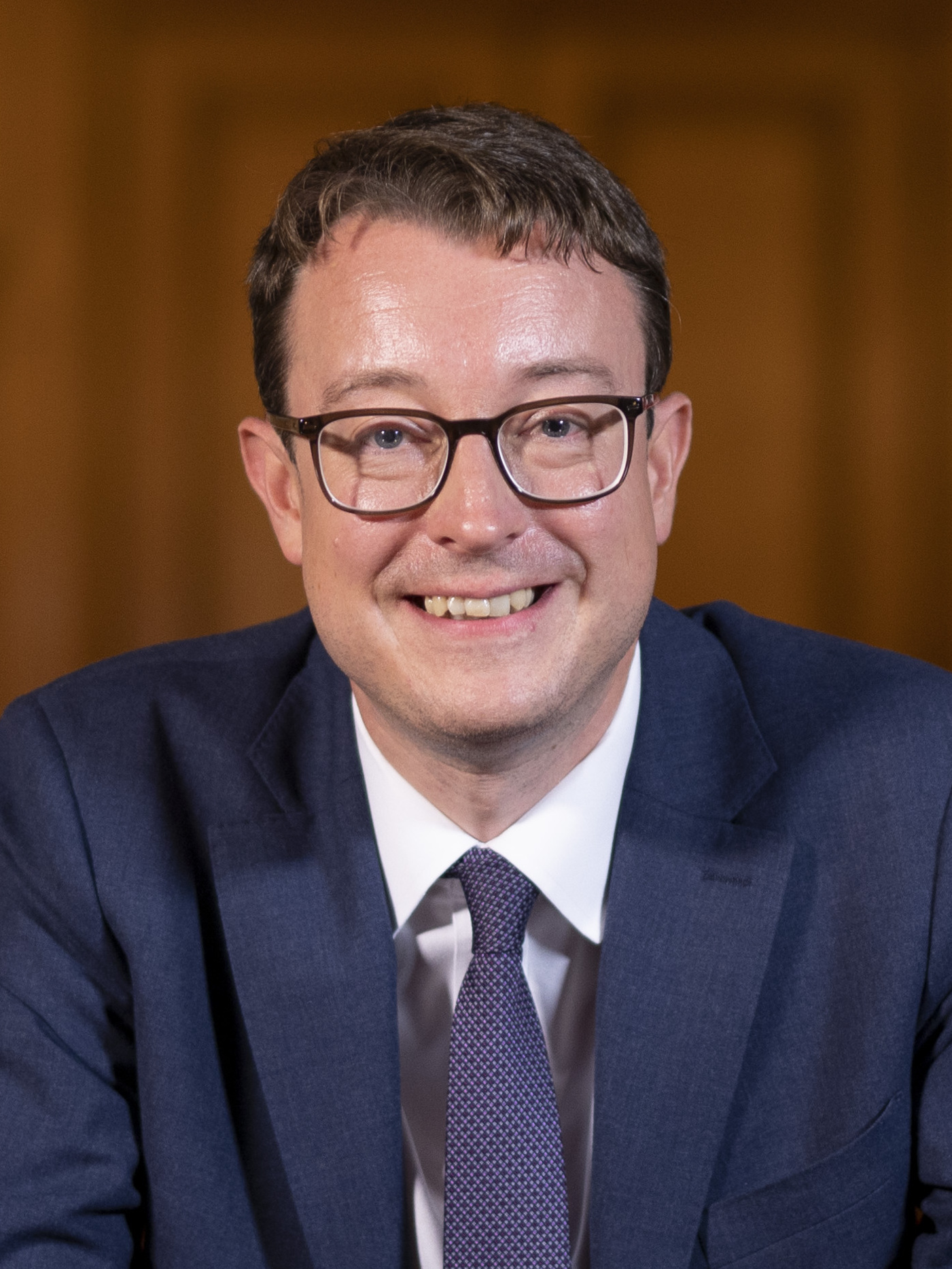
- Official portrait, 2022

Secretary of State for Levelling Up, Housing and Communities
- In office 6 September 2022 – 25 October 2022
- Prime Minister: Liz Truss
- Preceded by: Greg Clark
- Succeeded by: Michael Gove

Chief Secretary to the Treasury
- In office 15 September 2021 – 6 September 2022
- Prime Minister: Boris Johnson
- Chancellor: Rishi Sunak; Nadhim Zahawi
- Preceded by: Steve Barclay
- Succeeded by: Chris Philp

Minister of State for Regional Growth and Local Government
- In office 13 February 2020 – 8 September 2020
- Prime Minister: Boris Johnson
- Preceded by: Jake Berry
- Succeeded by: Luke Hall

Exchequer Secretary to the Treasury
- In office 27 July 2019 – 13 February 2020
- Prime Minister: Boris Johnson
- Preceded by: Robert Jenrick
- Succeeded by: Kemi Badenoch

Member of Parliament for Middlesbrough South and East Cleveland
- In office 8 June 2017 – 30 May 2024
- Preceded by: Tom Blenkinsop
- Succeeded by: Luke Myer

Personal details
- Born: 28 September 1984 (age 41) Stockton-on-Tees, County Durham, England
- Party: Conservative
- Education: Red House School; University College, Oxford

Sir Simon Richard Clarke (born 28 September 1984) is a British Conservative politician who was the Member of Parliament (MP) for Middlesbrough South and East Cleveland from 2017 to 2024. He briefly served as Secretary of State for Levelling Up, Housing and Communities from September to October 2022 and Chief Secretary to the Treasury from 2021 to 2022.

Following Boris Johnson's appointment as Prime Minister, Clarke was appointed Exchequer Secretary to the Treasury. He served as Minister of State for Regional Growth and Local Government from February to September 2020. In the 2021 cabinet reshuffle he was returned to Government as Chief Secretary to the Treasury, becoming the youngest cabinet minister in that ministry. After Johnson resigned in 2022, Clarke supported Liz Truss's bid to become Conservative leader. Following Truss's appointment as Prime Minister, he was appointed Secretary of State for Levelling Up, Housing and Communities, a post he held for 49 days until his resignation prior to the accession of Rishi Sunak to the Prime Ministership.

He lost his seat in Parliament on 4 July 2024 in the general election. Despite Reform UK not fielding a candidate, Clarke was narrowly voted out.

== Early life and education ==
Simon Clarke was born on 28 September 1984 in University Hospital of North Tees and grew up in the suburb of Marton, Middlesbrough. His parents Richard and Jill Clarke were a solicitor and stay-at-home mother. He was privately educated at Red House School in Norton, before going on to study History at University College, Oxford. At university, he was chairman of the Oxford University Conservative Association in 2006.

== Parliamentary career ==
Clarke unsuccessfully stood as the Conservative candidate for the Middlesbrough constituency at the 2015 general election, coming third of five candidates with 16.5%, a swing against his party of 2.3%. Whilst being employed as a Policy Advisor to the Conservative MP Graham Stuart, he was selected as the candidate for Middlesbrough South and East Cleveland in April 2017. He was elected at the 2017 general election, winning the seat from Labour after the sitting MP Tom Blenkinsop stood down.

Clarke has served on the Treasury Committee, the Treasury Sub-Committee and the Regulatory Reform Committee. He clashed with both the then-Labour MP for Redcar, Anna Turley and the Labour-run Middlesbrough Council over plans for transport improvements in the local area, while he argued against his own party's opposition to onshore windfarms.

On 12 June 2019 the UK Government amended the Climate Change Act 2008 by introducing a target for a 100% reduction of greenhouse gas emissions (compared to 1990 levels) in the UK by 2050. At the forefront of this change in policy was Clarke, who, in September 2018, organised a letter signed by more than 130 cross-party MPs which indicated their support for net zero emissions and stressed opportunities for UK businesses, including in the North East.

On 27 July 2019 he was appointed Exchequer Secretary to the Treasury in Boris Johnson's government. On 13 February 2020 he was appointed Minister of State for Regional Growth and Local Government. Clarke has been an advocate of regeneration both locally and nationally. In his role, he said that towns and coastal communities had not shared the benefits of the economic growth experienced in other parts of the UK. He said he supported regenerative measures undertaken by private initiatives in his constituency such as the reopening and expanding of Teesside International Airport, alongside the Tees Valley Mayor's plans to redevelop the SSI steelworks site.

At the 2019 general election Clarke was re-elected, increasing his share of the vote to 58.8% and increasing his majority to 11,626.

In September 2020 Clarke resigned from his ministerial role, stating that his resignation was for personal reasons.

In a cabinet reshuffle on 15 September 2021, Clarke succeeded Steve Barclay in the Cabinet-attending post of Chief Secretary to the Treasury.

On 6 September 2022, Clarke was appointed Secretary of State for Levelling Up, Housing and Communities. He resigned from the role on 25 October 2022, prior to the accession of Rishi Sunak to the Premiership.

In December 2022, Clarke made an amendment to the Levelling Up Bill to ease planning rules for onshore wind farms in England which was signed by 34 Conservative MPs—including former Prime Ministers Boris Johnson and Liz Truss. As a result of a threatened rebellion led by Clarke, the Government said that a rule requiring new turbines to be built on pre-designated land would be rewritten.

== Political views ==
Clarke is a strong supporter of Brexit, having voted for the UK to leave the European Union, and is a supporter of the Eurosceptic campaign Leave Means Leave. He called the new Brexit deal secured by Boris Johnson "marvellous news", stating that the "anti-democratic backstop" had been abolished. He was critical of the negotiating approach taken by Theresa May and had submitted a letter for a vote of no confidence in her leadership.

On 6 June 2022, after a vote of no confidence in the leadership of Boris Johnson was called, Clarke announced that he would be supporting the Prime Minister, praising his leadership on Brexit, the COVID-19 pandemic and the Russian invasion of Ukraine, adding: "He has won every major election he has fought because he is a politician with the capacity both to inspire and to deliver."

Writing in The Telegraph on 23 January 2024, Clarke called for Sunak to be replaced. Citing the opinion polling for the upcoming general election, Clarke stated that "Rishi Sunak is leading the Conservatives into an election where we will be massacred".

== Post-parliamentary career ==
In January 2025, Clarke was appointed Director at the centre-right think tank, Onward.

== Personal life ==
Clarke lives in the town of Guisborough, Teesside; and London.

His height, 6 feet 7 inches (2.01 m), makes him Britain's second-tallest MP and earned him the nickname "Stilts" at school.

Prior to the 2021 autumn budget, Clarke said he would not take part in the traditional publicity photo with the Chancellor of the Exchequer as he has agoraphobia.

== Honours ==
- Clarke was sworn in as a member of the Privy Council of the United Kingdom on 20 September 2021 at Balmoral Castle. This gave him the honorific prefix "The Right Honourable" for life.
- Clarke was appointed a Knight Bachelor on 9 June 2023 as part of the 2022 Prime Minister's Resignation Honours.

Parliament of the United Kingdom
Preceded by Tom Blenkinsop	Member of Parliament for Middlesbrough South and East Cleveland; 2017–2024	Succeeded by Luke Myer
Political offices
Preceded by Robert Jenrick	Exchequer Secretary to the Treasury; 2019–2020	Succeeded by Kemi Badenoch
Preceded by Jake Berry	Minister of State for Regional Growth and Local Government; 2020	Succeeded by Luke Hall
Preceded by Steve Barclay	Chief Secretary to the Treasury; 2021–2022	Succeeded by Chris Philp
Preceded by Greg Clark	Secretary of State for Levelling Up, Housing and Communities; 2022	Succeeded by Michael Gove
