= Richard Holt (MP for Langbaurgh) =

British politician

James Richard Holt (2 August 1931 – 20 September 1991) was a British politician and Conservative Member of Parliament.

== Political career ==
Holt first stood for Parliament, unsuccessfully, at Brent South in the February 1974 General Election.

He was elected for Langbaurgh at the 1983 election and was re-elected in 1987. In 1989 he was one of the Tory members who stated doubts about the proposed Community Charge . He died suddenly in his sleep, aged 60, in 1991. His successor in the resulting by-election was Labour's Ashok Kumar. However, at the 1992 general election the seat was regained by the Conservative Michael Bates.

Parliament of the United Kingdom
New constituency	Member of Parliament for Langbaurgh; 1983–1991	Succeeded by Ashok Kumar
