= Luke Myer =

British politician (born 1995)

Luke Myer MP
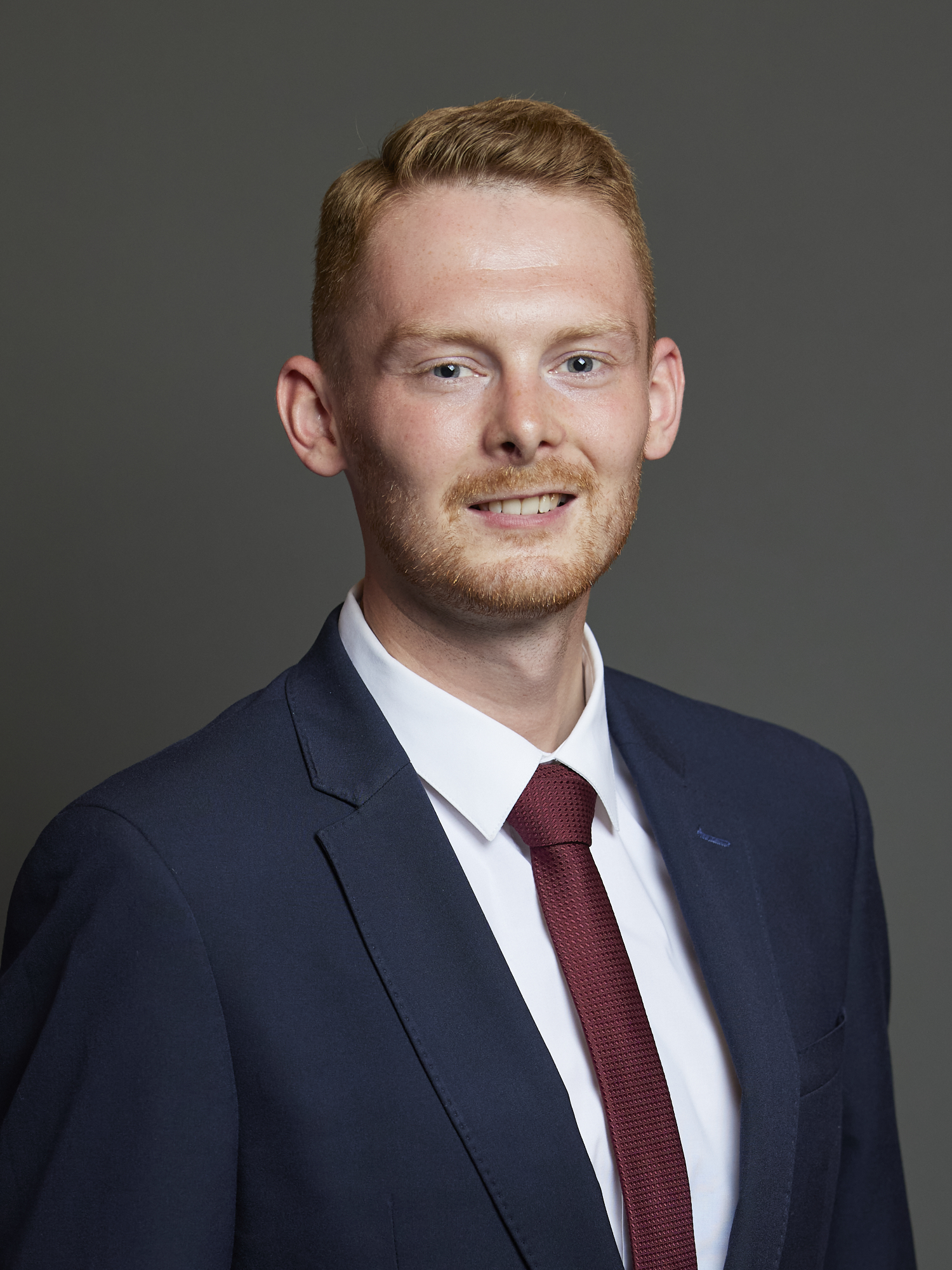
- Official portrait, 2024

Member of Parliament for Middlesbrough South and East Cleveland
- Incumbent
- Assumed office 4 July 2024
- Preceded by: Sir Simon Clarke
- Majority: 214 (0.6%)

Personal details
- Born: 5 May 1995 (age 31) Middlesbrough, North Yorkshire, England
- Party: Labour
- Education: Prior Pursglove Sixth Form College
- Alma mater: Edge Hill University

Luke Myer (born 5 May 1995) is a British Labour politician serving as Member of Parliament (MP) for Middlesbrough South and East Cleveland since 2024.

== Early life and education ==
Myer was born in Middlesbrough and grew up in the village of Brotton, North Yorkshire. He attended Freebrough Specialist Engineering College and Prior Pursglove College, before training as a teacher. Myer studied at Edge Hill University, where he was involved in the students’ union and NUS.

He worked on education policy at the UK Quality Assurance Agency for Higher Education, and served on the board of a Middlesbrough SEND charity. Myer later joined the centre-left think tank the Institute for Public Policy Research (IPPR) as a research fellow and policy analyst, specialising in economic development policy in the North East. He remained active in East Cleveland, volunteering as a school governor and raising money for a local foodbank during the COVID-19 pandemic.

== Political career ==
From 2021 to 2024, Myer served in local government; in his election to Redcar and Cleveland Borough Council, he defeated Conservative police commissioner Steve Turner as well as unseating the local Conservative council leader. He served as Cabinet Member for Children, where he introduced a child poverty strategy, opened new rural children's centres, and reduced the department's budget deficit.

He was elected to Parliament at the 2024 general election, defeating former Conservative minister Sir Simon Clarke with a majority of only 214 votes, overturning the highest Conservative majority in the Tees Valley.

== Parliamentary career ==
Myer committed to be a “constituency MP”, and held fifty surgeries in his first year. An analysis by The Northern Echo found that he had the lowest expenses in the region.

He has been described as “moderate” and has made several statements opposing political extremism on the left and right.

Myer has prioritised “investment in jobs, skills, and regional growth”. He was elected chair of the all-party parliamentary group on carbon capture and storage; in October 2024, the government announced £4 billion for the sector in Teesside. He also chairs the steel APPG, and supported the nationalisation of British Steel, which created jobs on Teesside. He launched an economic plan for East Cleveland and campaigned for investment.

He was criticised by The Telegraph as ‘obsessed with taxing the South'. He has called for reforms to local government, including scrapping council tax and creating a Teesside-wide children's social care body. In June 2025, he was part of a rebellion over planned cuts to disability benefits, which won concessions from the government.

He is endorsed by LGBT+ Labour.

== Personal life ==
He is married to his wife, Beth.

Parliament of the United Kingdom
Preceded by Simon Clarke	Member of Parliament for Middlesbrough South and East Cleveland; 2024–present	Incumbent
