= Tom Blenkinsop =

Former British Labour politician

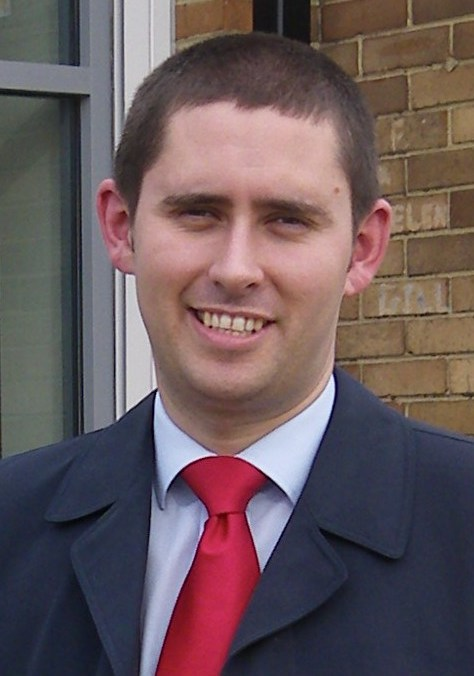
- Blenkinsop in 2010

Member of Parliament for Middlesbrough South and East Cleveland
- In office 6 May 2010 – 3 May 2017
- Preceded by: Ashok Kumar
- Succeeded by: Simon Clarke

Personal details
- Born: Thomas Francis Blenkinsop; 14 August 1980 (age 46) Middlesbrough, North Yorkshire, England
- Party: Labour
- Education: Teesside University (BSc); University of Warwick (MA)

Thomas Francis "Tom" Blenkinsop (born 14 August 1980) is a British politician who served as Member of Parliament (MP) for Middlesbrough South and East Cleveland from 2010 to 2017, as a member of the Labour Party.

== Early life and career ==
Blenkinsop was born on 14 August 1980 in Middlesbrough and brought up in Marton. He was educated at St. Augustine's Roman Catholic Primary School in Coulby Newham, Newlands School FCJ, and St. Mary's Sixth Form College in Saltersgill. He graduated from Teesside University with a BSc in Philosophy, Politics and Economics, and the University of Warwick with an MA in Continental philosophy.

Blenkinsop worked as a constituency researcher for Ashok Kumar, Labour MP for Middlesbrough South and East Cleveland, from 2002 to 2008. He became a campaign manager for the Community Trade Union in 2008 and continued in the role until his election to Parliament in 2010.

== Parliamentary career ==
Blenkinsop was selected as the Labour candidate for Middlesbrough South and East Cleveland in April 2010, following Ashok Kumar's unexpected death the previous month. He was elected at the May 2010 general election, albeit with a majority significantly reduced to under 2,000. During his first Parliamentary term, he was a member of the Environment, Food and Rural Affairs Select Committee from 2010 to 2012, the Standards and Privileges Committee from 2010 to 2011 and the Treasury Select Committee in 2011. He joined the opposition front bench under the leadership of Ed Miliband, serving as a whip from 2011 to 2015.

He was re-elected with a marginally increased majority at the 2015 general election. During his second Parliamentary term, he was a member of the Energy and Climate Change Committee from 2015 to 2016, the Privileges Committee from 2015 to 2017, the Standards Committee from 2015 to 2017, and the Northern Ireland Affairs Committee from 2016 to 2017. Blenkinsop signed up to the Army Reserve in 2017.

Blenkinsop supported Liz Kendall in the 2015 Labour leadership election and Owen Smith in the 2016 leadership election. After he called for party leader Jeremy Corbyn's resignation in 2016, a Labour member was suspended and investigated by the police for allegedly threatening him.

After the calling of the 2017 general election, Blenkinsop announced that me would not seek re-election as an MP as he could not stand as a Labour candidate whilst Corbyn served as party leader. Blenkinsop remained a Labour member, and campaigned for former Labour Colleagues, but not Corbyn.

== Post-parliamentary career ==
Blenkinsop returned to the Community union as a London-based project manager after leaving Parliament, and became a public affairs advisor for the Federation of Small Business in 2020. Since 2016 Blenkinsop has been a reservist soldier serving with 243 Provost Company, 1 Royal Military Police, Adjutant General's Corps.

== Personal life ==
Blenkinsop married Victoria Emtage in 2007.

== Honours ==
Blenkinsop was awarded the Queen Elizabeth II Platinum Jubilee Medal in 2022, and the King Charles III Coronation Medal 2023.

Parliament of the United Kingdom
Preceded by Ashok Kumar	Member of Parliament for Middlesbrough South and East Cleveland; 2010–2017	Succeeded by Simon Clarke
