= 1991 Langbaurgh by-election =

1991 UK Parliamentary by-election

- 7 November 1991

Constituency of Langbaurgh
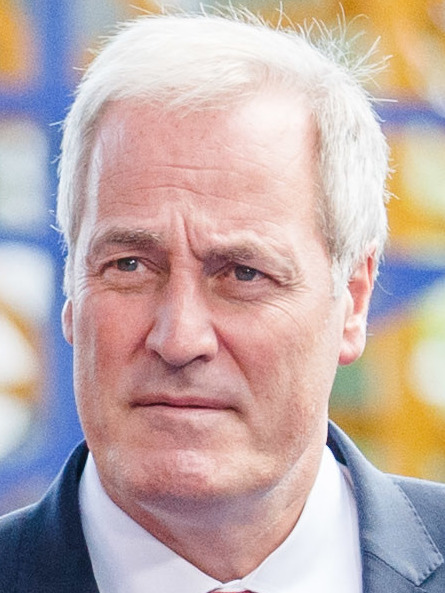
	First party	Second party	Third party
	Lab		LD
Candidate	Ashok Kumar	Michael Bates	Peter Allen
Party	Labour	Conservative	Liberal Democrats
Popular vote	22,442	20,467	8,421
Percentage	42.9%	39.1%	16.1%
Swing	▲4.5%	▼2.6%	▼3.7%
- A map of parliamentary constituencies within the former county of Cleveland at the time of the by-election, with Langbaurgh highlighted in red.
MP before election
Richard Holt
Conservative
Subsequent MP
Ashok Kumar
Labour

The 1991 Langbaurgh by-election was a by-election held on 7 November 1991 for the UK House of Commons constituency of Langbaurgh, in the former county of Cleveland in North East England. It was the final by-election of the 1987-1992 Parliament, and was held just five months before the 1992 general election.

The seat had become vacant upon the death of the Conservative Member of Parliament Richard Holt on 20 September 1991. Holt had held the seat since the 1983 general election.

The by-election was won by the Labour candidate, Ashok Kumar. It was held on the same day as a by-election in Kincardine and Deeside, which the Conservatives also lost.

== Result ==
Langbaurgh by-election, 1991
Party	Candidate	Votes	%	±%
Labour	Ashok Kumar	22,442	42.9	+4.5
Conservative	Michael Bates	20,467	39.1	−2.6
Liberal Democrats	Peter Allen	8,421	16.1	−3.7
Green	Gerald Parr	456	0.9	New
Yorkshire Party	Colin Holt	216	0.4	New
Corrective Party	Lindi St Clair	198	0.4	New
Football Supporters	Nigel Downing	163	0.3	New
Majority		1,975	3.8	N/A
Turnout		52,363		
Labour gain from Conservative		Swing	+3.55	

== Previous election ==
General election 1987: Langbaurgh
Party	Candidate	Votes	%	±%
Conservative	Richard Holt	26,047	41.7	0.0
Labour	Paul Harford	23,959	38.4	+7.0
Liberal	Robin Ashby	12,405	19.9	−7.0
Majority		2,088	3.4	−7.0
Turnout		62,411	78.8	+3.8
Conservative hold		Swing	−3.5	

== See also ==
- Langbaurgh (UK Parliament constituency)
- Lists of United Kingdom by-elections
