= Eston Town Hall =

Municipal building in Eston, North Yorkshire, England

Redcar and Cleveland Town Hall
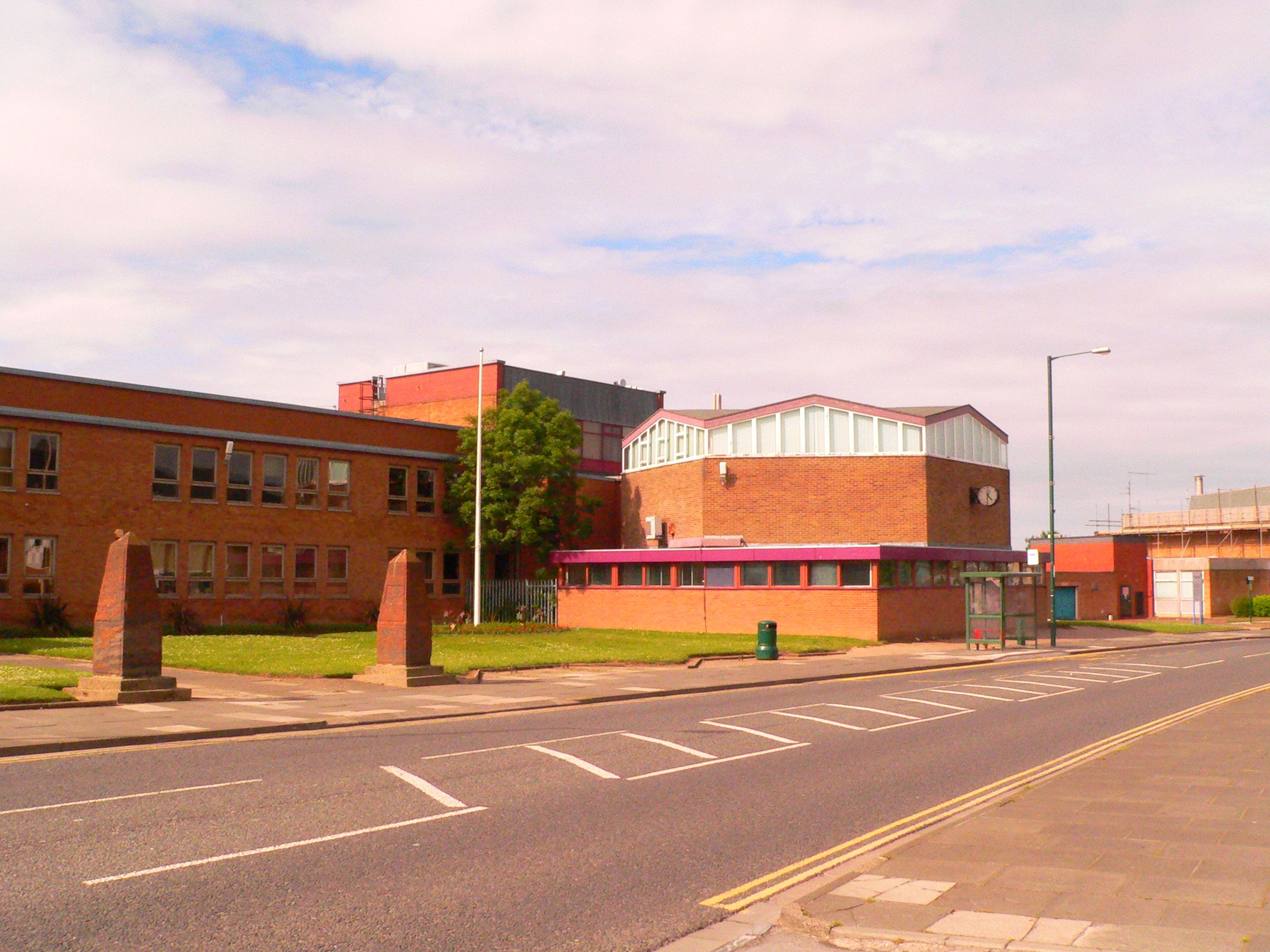
- The building in 2010

- Shown in North Yorkshire
- 54.5656°N 1.1571°W
- Location: Fabian Road, Teesville

History
- Built: 1961
- Demolished: 2012

Site notes
- Architect: John Poulson
- Architectural style: Modern style

Redcar and Cleveland Town Hall, formerly Eston Town Hall, was a municipal building in the Teesville area of Eston, in North Yorkshire, England. The building, which was the headquarters of Redcar and Cleveland District Council, was demolished in 2012.

== History ==
Following significant population growth, largely associated with the mining industry, a local board of health was appointed in Eston in 1884. The local board established offices on Whitworth Road in 1886. The board was succeeded by Eston Urban District Council in 1895 and the new council continued to use the offices on Whitworth Road. After amalgamation with Normanby Urban District Council in 1915, the enlarged Eston Urban District Council moved to Cleveland House on Eston Road in 1920.

After the Second World War, the council decided to commission a dedicated town hall. The new building was designed in the modern style by John Poulson, who was also the architect for many other buildings in the town, something later linked to corruption. It was built in red brick and was officially opened by Councillor Bill Herlingshaw on 15 May 1961. The design involved a main rectangular block, with an hexagonal structure to accommodate the council chamber at the southeast corner of the main block.

The town hall continued to serve as the headquarters of the council for the next decade and remained the meeting place for the enlarged Langbaurgh Borough Council, which was formed in 1974. The council became known as Redcar and Cleveland Borough Council in 1996.

By 2004, the building was in poor condition, with an estimated repair bill of £850,000. The council proposed moving its headquarters to new civic offices, while retaining some staff at the building, and using it for mayoral functions until 2007. The plan was opposed by the local Labour Party, and was dropped when it won control of the council. However, by 2012, repair costs had grown to £2.4 million. Council staff were moved to other locations, including new offices at Redcar and Cleveland Civic Centre in Ridley Street in Redcar, and the building was demolished.
