= Redcar and Cleveland Borough Council =

Unitary authority in England

Type
- Type: Unitary authority

Leadership
- Mayor: Ceri Cawley, Labour since 21 May 2026
- Leader: Alec Brown, Labour since 25 May 2023
- Managing Director: Brian Archer since September 2025

Structure
- Seats: 59 councillors
- Graph of the party split among 59 seats.
- Political groups: Administration (21) Labour (21) Other parties (38) Conservative (13) Liberal Democrats (10) Reform (1) East Cleveland Ind. (1) Independent (13)
- Joint committees: Tees Valley Combined Authority
- Length of term: 4 years

Elections
- Last election: 4 May 2023
- Next election: 6 May 2027

Meeting place
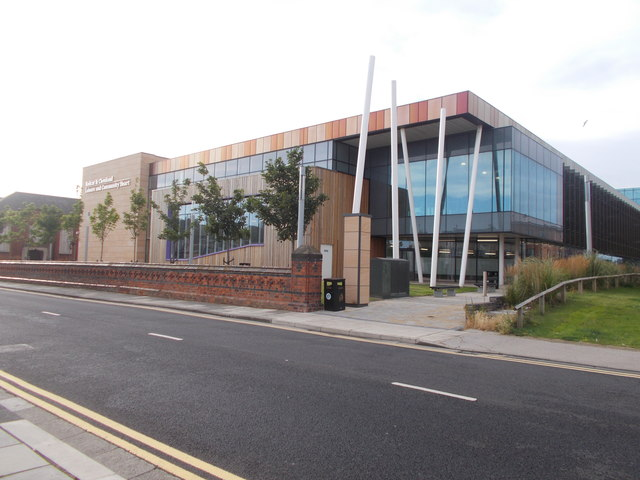
- Civic Centre, Ridley Street, Redcar, TS10 1TD

Website
- www.redcar-cleveland.gov.uk

Redcar and Cleveland Borough Council is the local authority for Redcar and Cleveland, a local government district with borough status in the ceremonial county of North Yorkshire, England. Since 1996 the council has been a unitary authority, being a district council which also performs the functions of a county council. The council was created in 1974 as Langbaurgh Borough Council and was a lower-tier authority until 1996 when it was renamed and became a unitary authority, taking over county-level functions from the abolished Cleveland County Council.

Since 2016 the council has been a member of the Tees Valley Combined Authority, which has been led by the directly elected Tees Valley Mayor since 2017. The council has been under no overall control since 2013, being led by a minority Labour administration since 2023. It is based at the Civic Centre in Redcar.

== History ==
The district and its council were created in 1974 under the Local Government Act 1972, as one of four districts within the new county of Cleveland. The new district covered the whole area of four former districts and part of a fifth, all of which were abolished at the same time:

- Guisborough Urban District
- Loftus Urban District
- Saltburn and Marske-by-the-Sea Urban District
- Skelton and Brotton Urban District
- Teesside County Borough (Coatham, Eston Grange, Kirkleatham, Ormesby, Redcar and South Bank wards only)

The district was named Langbaurgh after the ancient Langbaurgh Wapentake. The county borough of Teesside had only been created six years earlier in 1968; the wards from Teesside which became part of Langbaurgh broadly corresponded to the pre-1968 municipal borough of Redcar, urban district of Eston and parish of Ormesby.

The first election was held in 1973. For its first year the council acted as a shadow authority alongside the area's outgoing authorities. The new district and its council formally came into being on 1 April 1974, at which point the old districts and their councils were abolished. The district was granted borough status from its creation, allowing the chair of the council to take the title of mayor. The council changed the district's name from Langbaurgh to Langbaurgh-on-Tees with effect from 1 January 1988.

From 1974 until 1996 the council provided only district-level services, with county-level services provided by Cleveland County Council. The county and its council were abolished in 1996 and the area's four boroughs became unitary authorities. The way this change was implemented was to rename the existing borough Redcar and Cleveland, and create a new non-metropolitan county of Redcar and Cleveland covering the same area as the borough, but with no separate county council; instead the existing borough council took on county-level functions. At the same time the borough was transferred for ceremonial purposes to North Yorkshire, but as a unitary authority it has always been independent from North Yorkshire Council.

== Governance ==
Redcar and Cleveland Borough Council provides both county-level and district-level services. Parts of the borough are included in civil parishes, which form a second tier of local government for their areas. The north-west of the borough, corresponding to the parts that were in the County Borough of Teesside between 1968 and 1974, is an unparished area.

Since 2016 the council has been a member of the Tees Valley Combined Authority.

=== Political control ===
The council has been under no overall control since 2013. Following the 2023 election a minority Labour administration took control of the council.

Political control of the council since 1974 has been as follows:

Langbaurgh (lower-tier district)

Party in control	Years
No overall control	1974–1976
Conservative	1976–1979
Labour	1979–1987
No overall control	1987–1991
Labour	1991–1996

Redcar and Cleveland (unitary authority)

Party in control	Years
Labour	1996–2003
No overall control	2003–2011
Labour	2011–2013
No overall control	2013–present

=== Leadership ===
The role of mayor is largely ceremonial in Redcar and Cleveland. Political leadership is instead provided by the leader of the council. The leaders since 1995 have been:

Councillor	Party	From	To
Brian Roberts	Labour	1995	1999
Dave Walsh	Labour	1999	2003
Eric Empson	Liberal Democrats	2003	2007
George Dunning	Labour	2007	12 Feb 2015
Mary Lanigan	Independent	12 Feb 2015	May 2015
Sue Jeffrey	Labour	May 2015	May 2019
Mary Lanigan	Independent	23 May 2019	May 2023
Alec Brown	Labour	25 May 2023	

=== Composition ===
Following the 2023 election, and subsequent by-elections and changes of allegiance up to September 2026, the composition of the council was:

Party	Seats
Labour	20
Conservative	13
Liberal Democrats	10
Reform	1
East Cleveland Independent	1
Independent	14
Total	59

The East Cleveland Independent councillor and 11 of the independent councillors sit together as the "Independent Group". The next election is due in 2027.

== Elections ==
Since the last boundary changes in 2019 the council has comprised 59 councillors representing 24 wards, with each ward electing one, two or three councillors. Elections are held every four years.

== Premises ==
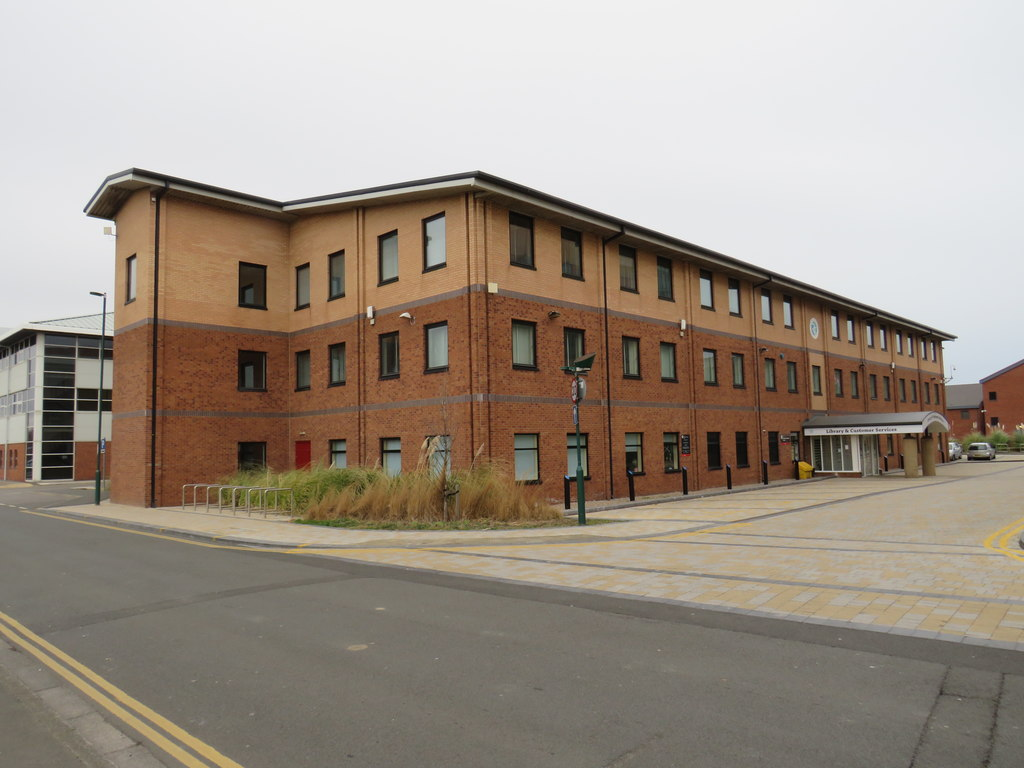
Redcar and Cleveland House, Kirkleatham Street, Redcar, TS10 1RT: Council's main offices.

The council meets at the Civic Centre on Ridley Street in Redcar. It has its main offices in the adjoining Redcar and Cleveland House at the corner of Ridley Street and Kirkleatham Street, which was built in 1996 to accommodate the extra staff the council took on when it became a unitary authority. The Civic Centre opened in 2014 as part of a £31 million development called the "Leisure and Community Heart", which incorporates a council chamber, mayor's parlour, register services, meeting rooms, 44 business units, as well as sport and leisure facilities.

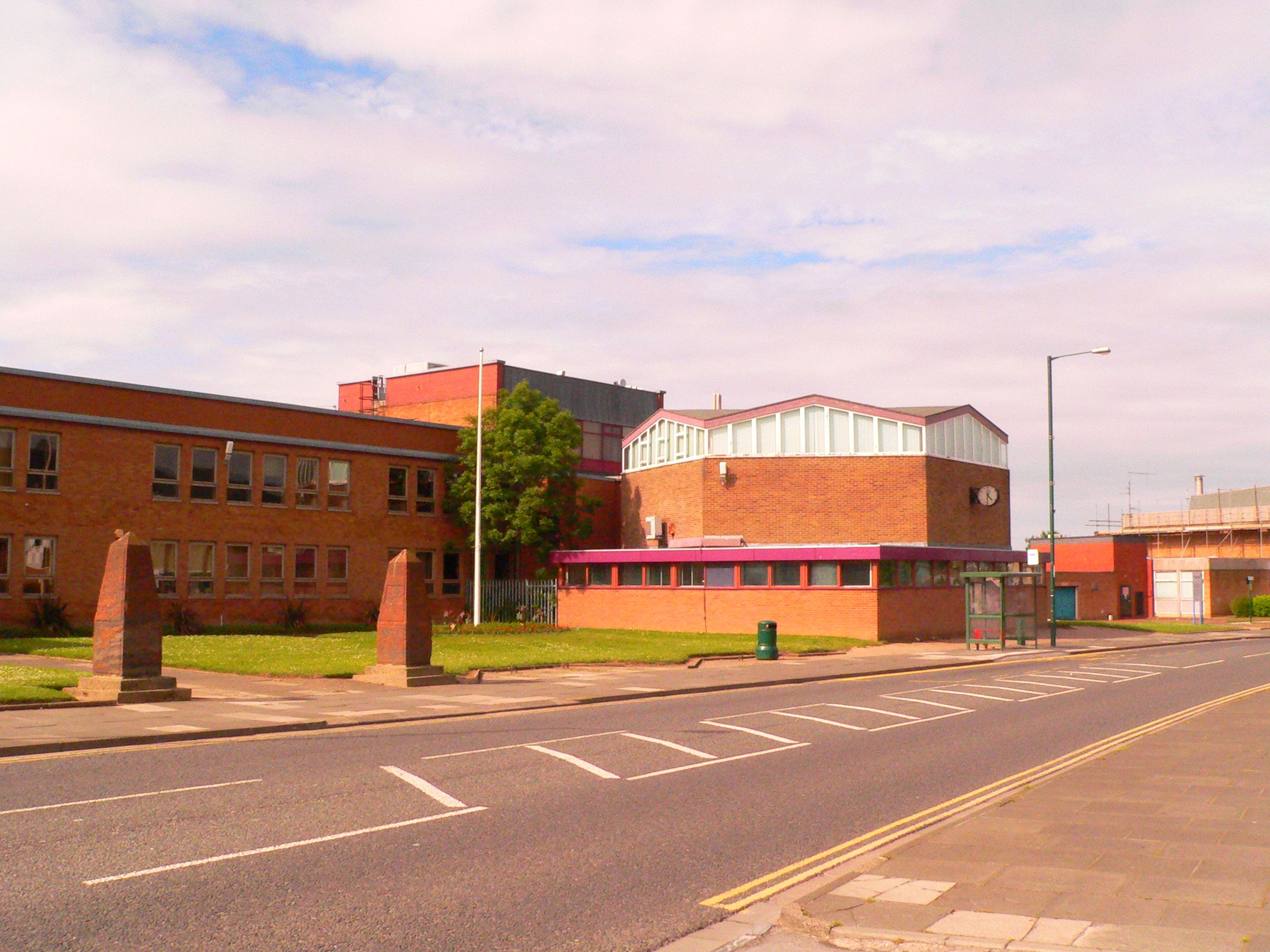
Town Hall, Fabian Road, Teesville: Council's headquarters 1974–2012

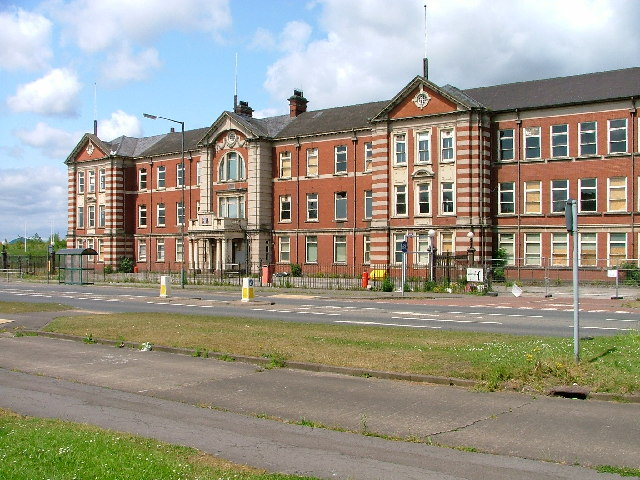
Cargo Fleet Building: Council's additional offices 1981–2002

When first created in 1974 the council used Eston Town Hall on Fabian Road in Teesville as its headquarters, which had been built in 1961 for the old Eston Urban District Council. In 1981 the council also bought the former headquarters of the Cargo Fleet Iron Company in South Bank, which had been built in 1916. The Cargo Fleet building closed in 2002 and Eston Town Hall was demolished in 2012.
