= Proposed expungements of the impeachments of Donald Trump =

In the 2020s, a proposal has been floated by Republican members of the United States House of Representatives and United States Senate to have one of the chambers vote to adopt a resolution to "expunge" one or both of the two impeachments of U.S. president Donald Trump, a Republican. Both of Trump's impeachments occurred in the first of his two nonconsecutive terms. Trump himself has called for the adoption of such resolutions. In June 2023, the effort received support from then-Speaker Kevin McCarthy. No such resolutions, however, have yet been adopted. In 2026, Trump and his allies renewed efforts to have his impeachments declared expunged. House Speaker Mike Johnson dubbed it "a priority".

There is no precedent of the House voting to expunge a federal impeachment. Legal, political experts, and historians expressed skepticism as to the impact and significance that such a vote would have. Many have argued that such a vote could only be symbolic and would have little or no legal effect, while some differing opinions have argued that there is nothing to preclude Congress from revoking a previous impeachment action. Many commentators have characterized the proposal as an attempt by Republicans to delegitimize Trump's impeachments in the public's recollection.

== Background ==
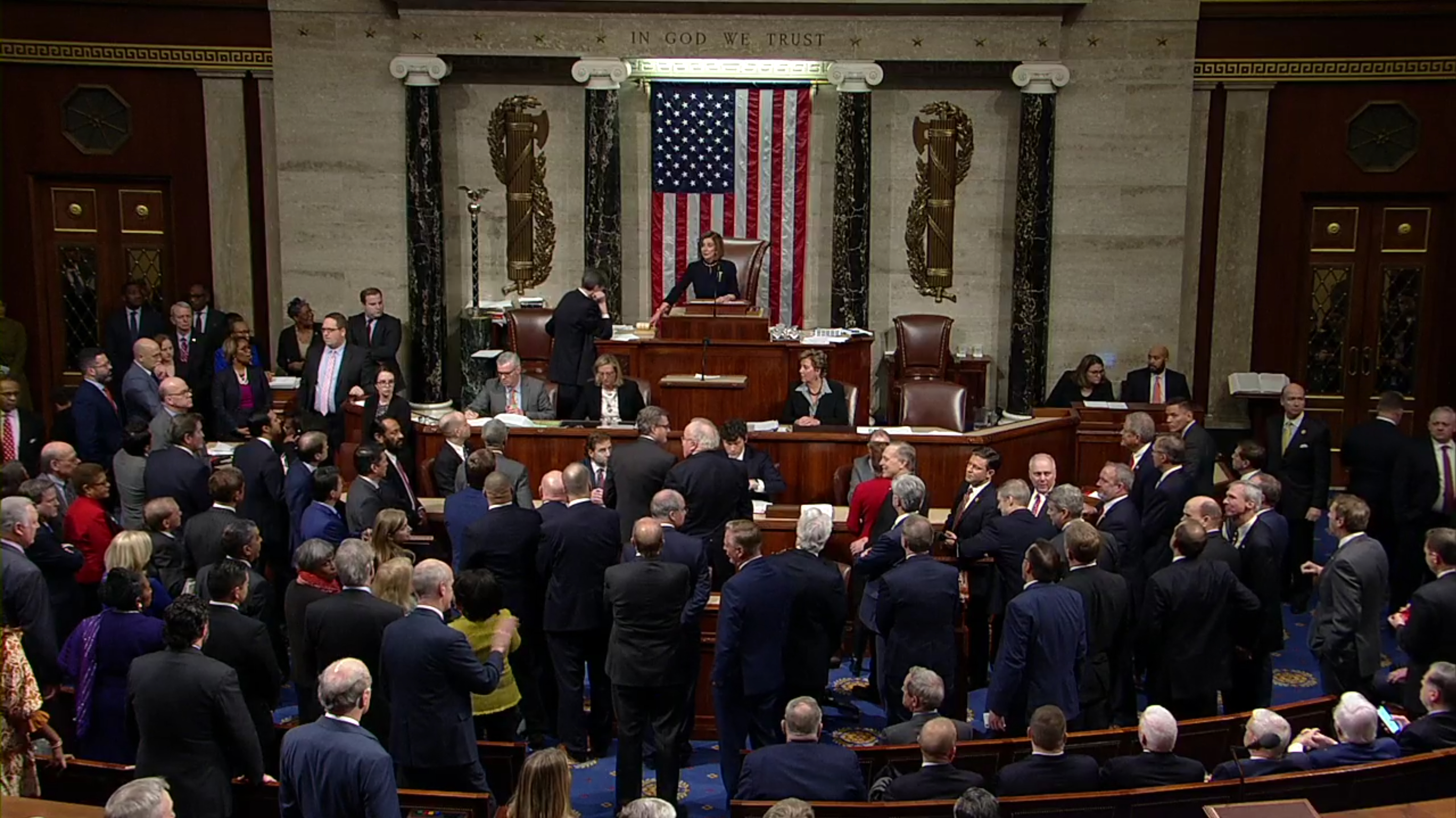
House voting to adopt the first impeachment of Trump

While serving as president of the United States, Donald Trump (a Republican) was twice impeached by the United States House of Representatives while it had Democratic Party majorities. His first impeachment was in 2019 for the Trump–Ukraine scandal. His second impeachment charged him with inciting the January 6 United States Capitol attack. Trump was acquitted in both of his impeachment trials before the United States Senate, as neither trial resulted in the two-thirds supermajority required to convict.

== Proposals to expunge Trump's impeachments ==
On February 1, 2020, days before the conclusion of Trump's first impeachment trial, Republican Congressman Lee Zeldin opined that Republicans should expunge the impeachment if they won a House majority in the upcoming 2020 House elections, tweeting, "The House of Representatives should EXPUNGE this sham impeachment in January 2021!" On February 5, the day that the impeachment trial ended in acquittal, Republican House Minority Leader Kevin McCarthy was quoted by the New York Post as remarking, "This is the fastest, weakest, most political impeachment in history. I don't think it should stay on the books." Two days after the impeachment trial ended, after being asked by a reporter about the prospect of having his impeachment expunged by the House, Trump remarked,

They should, because it was a hoax. That's a very good question. Should they expunge the impeachment in the House? They should because it was a hoax. It was a total political hoax.

In 2022, Republican Congressman Markwayne Mullin introduced resolutions to remove Trump's impeachments from the Congressional Record. This received support from House Republican Conference Chair Elise Stefanik. At the time, the House had a Democratic Party majority and the resolution was not passed.

On January 12, 2023, Kevin McCarthy, by then recently elected to serve as speaker of the House, voiced openness to the concept, remarking, "I would understand why members would want to bring that forward. I understand why individuals want to do it, and we'd look at it."

On June 22, 2023, Republican Congresswomen Elise Stefanik, chair of the Republican House Conference, and Marjorie Taylor Greene introduced a pair of resolutions to expunge Trump's impeachments which were then sent to the House Judiciary Committee. The next day, Speaker McCarthy lent his support to the resolutions.

The proposed resolutions (one for each impeachment) instructed that the intended effect of expungement would be to make things, "as if such Articles had never passed the full House of Representatives". The resolution authored by Greene would resolve to expunge the 2019 impeachment on the grounds that Trump had been "wrongfully accused of misconduct." The resolution authored by Stefanik would resolve to expunge the 2021 impeachment on the grounds that those who advanced the impeachment had failed to prove Trump had committed high crimes and misdemeanors.

In July 2023, Democratic House Minority Leader Hakeem Jeffries, condemned the effort, remarking, "The extreme MAGA Republicans are more concerned with settling scores on behalf of the former twice impeached, President of the United States of America, the insurrectionist in chief, Donald Trump, instead of solving problems for the American people." House Speaker Emerita Nancy Pelosi, also a Democrat, characterized the effort as "pathetic".

In late July 2023, Politico published a report that unnamed sources had claimed that McCarthy had promised Trump that the House would vote to expunge Trump's impeachments prior to the House's August 2023 recess. The report said that this promise had been made by McCarthy as an effort to make peace with Trump, coming after McCarthy upset Trump with public comments in July 2023 on Trump's general election prospects as a 2024 presidential nominee. McCarthy publicly denied that such a promise had been made. Multiple weeks after the October 2023 removal of Kevin McCarthy as Speaker of the House, McCarthy called Trump to ask why he did not support him when he was facing removal. Trump responded with a retort asking why McCarthy had not expunged his impeachments and endorsed his 2024 presidential campaign. The 118th Congress concluded without any confessional action being taken on the two resolutions beyond their initial referral to committee.

On January 9, 2025 (days into the 119th Congress), Greene introduced a pair of proposed resolutions to expunge Trump's impeachments. She was joined by several Republican co-sponsors. The resolution to expunge the first impeachment claimed that Trump was wrongfully accused of misconduct in the impeachment. The resolution to expunge the second impeachment claimed the impeachment should be expunged because House Democrats had not made an effort to understand why some Americans did not trust the results of the 2020 election.

The Trump administration acted in April 2026 to revive efforts to expunge one of Trump's prior impeachments. That month, Tulsi Gabbard (Trump's director of national intelligence) issued a report in which she questioned the circumstances that triggered the first impeachment. Her report, relying on what Forbes described as "seemingly flimsy evidence", questioned the motivations of the whistleblower, but did not question the veracity of facts cited by the articles of impeachment. Soon after, Alan Dershowitz (Trump's counsel in his first impeachment trial) argued in an interview that Trump could be able to request the United States Supreme Court or the United States Congress nullify the impeachment. Trump praised Dershowitz's remarks on social media. Right-wing outlet Just The News quoted Republican Congressman Jim Jordan as disclosing that he and other House members were exploring a resolution to expunge Trump's first impeachment. Days later, Republican Senator Rick Scott introduced a resolution to the Senate that, if adopted, would resolve that the chamber considers Trump's first impeachment trial to have lacked "legitimacy". Trump applauded the proposed resolution. That same month, Congressman Darrell Issa introduced a resolution in the House to expunge both Trump impeachments. In early June 2026, reporting emerged that Trump was pressuring House Republicans to expunge both of the impeachments from his first term. In a statement to The Wall Street Journal, House Speaker Mike Johnson (a Republican) praised the idea and called it "a priority" for House Republicans.

== Analysis ==
=== Lack of precedent ===
An expungement of an impeachment is unprecedented. Neither the United States Constitution nor the rules of the U.S. House of Representatives outline any processes for expunging (or otherwise undoing) an impeachment. Writing for the government watchdog organization Citizens for Responsibility and Ethics in Washington, Gabe Lezra observed that not only would it be unprecedented for the House to adopt a resolution expunging impeachments, but that he could find no record of any previous instance in which such resolutions were given any serious consideration.

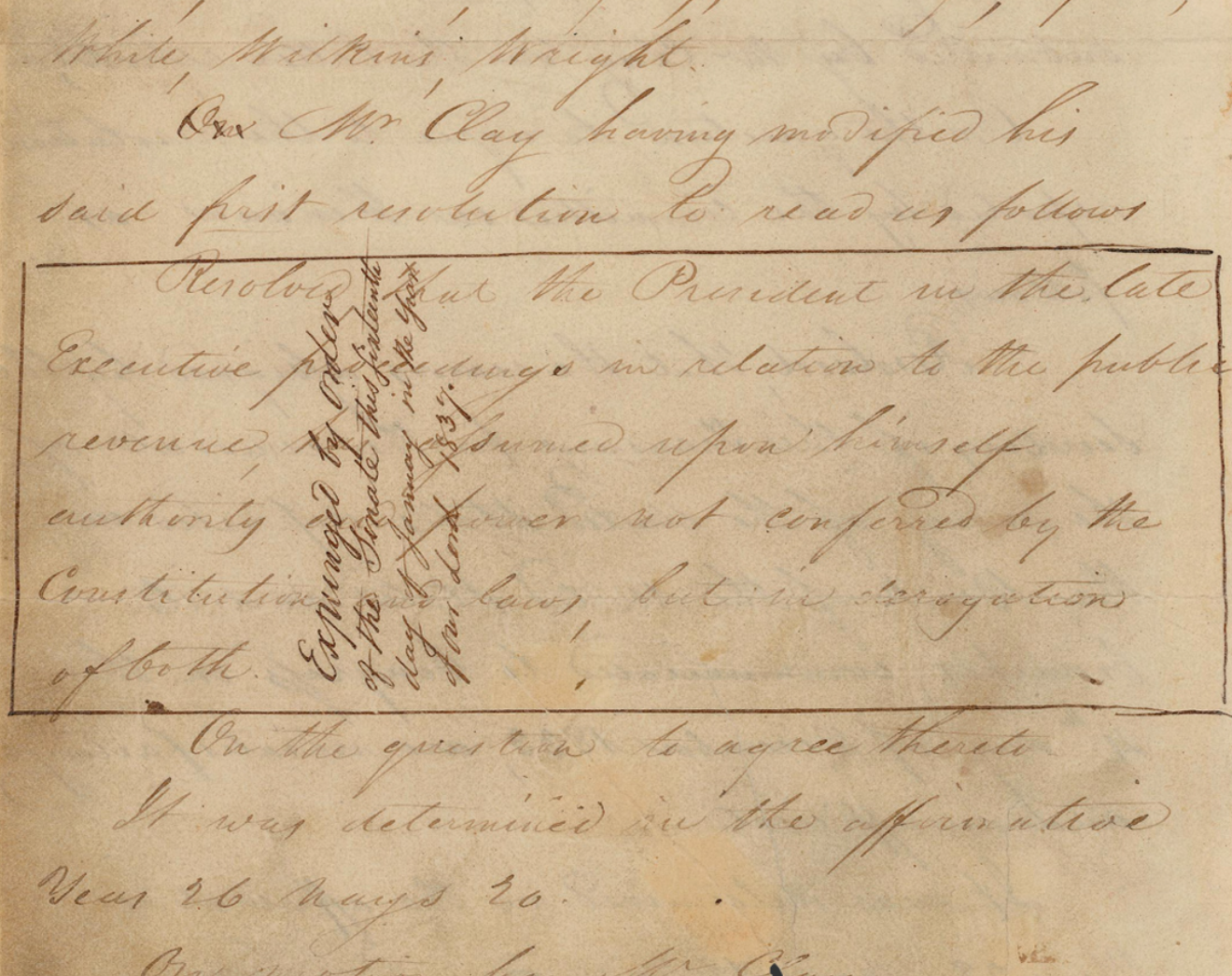
Handwritten legislative Journal of the United States Senate with a notation indicating that the 1834 censure of Andrew Jackson had been "expunged by the Senate"

Not only is there no direct precedent for an expungement of an impeachment, but there are also scarce analogues to be found. One partial-analogue was the 1837 vote by a Democratic-controlled Senate to "expunge" an 1834 censure of Democratic president Andrew Jackson, with the president's party aiming to undo a censure adopted by a previous Whig-controlled Senate. In November 2010, Democratic Congressman Chaka Fattah introduced a House resolution which would have "disavow[ed]" the 1998 impeachment of President Bill Clinton. His resolution attracted no cosponsors, and was referred to a congressional subcommittee with no further action ever taken on it.

=== Legality and official impact ===
Legal and political experts have mostly been skeptical as to the impact and significance that an expungement vote would actually have. In June 2023, Sara Dorn of Forbes wrote that, "politicos have widely mocked", the idea, "while experts have expressed uncertainty about its impact." At the same time, Claire Hansen of the U.S. News & World Report wrote of the possibility of removing the impeachments from the congressional record that, "it's far from clear that the House would have the legal or political authority to erase such a record." In January 2023, Samaa Khullar of Salon described experts as largely having "mock[ed]" the concept of expunging Trump's impeachments.

In June 2023, USA Today characterized the prevailing opinion of experts as being that the House lacked the authority to remove from the Congressional Record previous votes of the House, and also noted that the House's ability to erase record of the impeachment was further prohibited by the fact that records of the impeachment trials were records of the Senate and not House. In July 2023, The Dallas Morning News reported that there was significant doubt that a House resolution could have authority to amend the Congressional Record, and that even regardless of whether the House had the authority to remove the House's adoptions of articles of impeachment from the Congressional Record, it would still seemingly lack authority to remove record of the impeachment trials since those would be records of Senate (not House) proceedings,

In 2022, Steve Benen of MSNBC wrote of the idea, "The [Republican] effort to rewrite history is ridiculous." Comparing it to the 1837 expungement of Jackson's censure he wrote, "The point at the time [of Jackson's expungement] was for partisans to say that the congressional action happened, but for the sake of the historical record, it didn't really count. Trump's acolytes appear to have similar intentions now." In June 2023, Ed Kilgore of The Intelligencer argued that the legal parallels to the 1837 expungement of Andrew Jackson's censure are even limited, since impeachments are an action outlined in the United States Constitution, while censures are not. Georgetown Law Professor Josh Chafetz noted that another distinction is that a censure is the act of only one chamber of the United States Congress, whereas Trump's impeachments each involved both an impeachment vote in the House of Representatives and an impeachment trial in the Senate, remarking,

Impeachment is different [than censure] because when the House impeaches a president, then it then causes something outside of the House to happen. So my view is that the House can't sort of expunge an impeachment. Once it has impeached, the matter is sort of out of the House's hands at that point, which I think makes it importantly different than a censure.

Chafetz further opined that a vote by the House to "expunge" Trump's impeachment,

Wouldn't actually change anything, except it would constitute a sort of statement in relatively strong language by the House that it doesn't think that they should have impeached Trump in the first place.

In July 2023, characterizing the effort as "political theater", fellow Georgetown Law professor David Super remarked,

There's nothing to expunge from and there's no legal authority for an expungement. There's no provision in the Constitution for undoing an impeachment. There's also no legal effect of an impeachment that doesn't result in a conviction, so there's nothing for the House to cancel. It's a fact of history that Andrew Johnson was impeached once, Bill Clinton was impeached once and Donald Trump was impeached twice, and annuling that is like saying you're going to annul Paul Revere's ride. It happened whether you like it or not... . There's nothing in the Constitution that authorizes just the House to take an action of this kind, and since the framers certainly knew how to write that, as to those who wrote some of the amendments, we have to assume that there's no such power exists... . The Constitution does not provide any legal effect for an impeachment except that it authorizes a trial of conviction in the Senate. There were two impeachments, neither resulted in a conviction in the Senate and it has no legal effect. You can't undo something that has no effect in the first place and it would be very strange if the framers saw any reason to do that. This is pure theater.

In 2020, Brookings Institution senior fellow in governance studies and George Washington University political science professor Sarah Binder opined that any motion to expunge would be "cosmetic". She noted that despite the vote to "expunge" his censure, "we still count Andrew Jackson as the only censured president." Binder further remarked,

This current House agreed to [the impeachment resolution]. And while a future House could adopt a resolution that says it is striking the adoption from the Record, that doesn't undo the fact that the current House agreed to those two articles of impeachment.

In 2020, Rutgers American politics professor Ross Baker commented on the idea of expunging Trump's first impeachment, "There is no way I know of to expunge an impeachment... . The impeachment is indelible; the high court of history has already ruled it in." At the same time, University at Buffalo Law School professor James Gardner similarly commented "There's nothing in the Constitution that provides for a procedure of expungement," opining that an expungement vote, "would be of no significance. Certainly of no legal significance....It might be of political significance." Democrat Nancy Pelosi, at the time the speaker of the House, expressed her belief that expungement of an impeachment is not something that can actually be done. Pelosi expressed her belief that impeachment is "forever". In July 2023, Pelosi remarked, "it is not even clear if [the House] constitutionally can expunge those things."

In June 2023, writers for Fox News, Axios, and The Independent each characterized the impact of a resolution to expunge as being "largely symbolic". Sahil Kapur of NBC News wrote that an expungement vote would, "amount to a symbolic pro-Trump vote without legal or practical impact."

In June 2023, Eugene Robinson of The Washington Post wrote,

For the record, expunging a presidential impeachment is not a thing. It has never been attempted because it makes no sense. Both of Trump's House impeachments led to trials in the Senate, as the Constitution instructs. Is the Senate supposed to pretend that those trials, which ended in acquittals, never happened? What about the pages in the Congressional Record that chronicle the impeachment proceedings? Would they be ripped out and destroyed?

In June 2023, conservative legal scholar Jonathan Turley of George Washington University Law School expressed the belief that the idea of expunging an impeachment is nonsensical, since impeachments do not involve criminal charges. Turley had been a witness during the 2019 impeachment inquiry against Donald Trump, having been called to provide expert testimony on behalf of Trump's defense. In June 2023, Turley remarked, "[Impeachment] is not like a constitutional DUI. Once you are impeached, you are impeached," adding that the United States Constitution lacks any provision for expunging impeachments. Turley, however noted that an expungement resolution could still be historically significant in expressing a congress's belief that an earlier congress's impeachment had been an error. Turley had, in 2020, earlier commented on the concept of expunging Trump's first impeachment by remarking,

Expungement is more cathartic than constitutional. The President was impeached the minute a majority voted on [the first article of impeachment]. ... The House can express the view of that House as to the basis for impeachment, nothing more. It will create a record of its own but not alter the record of the prior Congress.

While most legal and political experts have been dismissive of the legal legitimacy that an expungement vote could carry, some have expressed a viewpoint that this is perhaps uncertain due to lack of any explicit prohibition against such a vote. In 2022, Jesse Rifkin of GovTrack Insider observed that, "nothing in the Constitution explicitly precludes Congress from taking an impeachment back." In 2019, Indiana Law School professor Gerard Magliocca wrote of the idea of expunging Trump's first impeachment,

It's never been done before, but I am hard-pressed to see why the House is bound by an impeachment passed by a prior one. This is different from an impeachment and a conviction. The Senate's judgment in impeachment trials is final. The impeachment itself, though, is not different from any other House resolution ... I doubt, though, that a repeal of an impeachment will mean that people will say that President Trump was not impeached.

In a June 2023 opinion piece published by MSNBC, Hayes Brown noted that there is no rule explicitly forbidding such an action and that the judiciary has generally taken a "hands-off approach" on questions related to impeachment. Brown further wrote,

Impeachment is a political matter, not a legal one. The common comparison is that articles of impeachment are akin to criminal charges being filed, which are then tried in an impeachment court. Carrying that metaphor through, it tracks that much as arrests and charges can be expunged from civilians’ records, the House could expunge articles of impeachment from Trump's. As for the practical effect the resolutions from Greene and Stefanik would have, that's less clear. When a court orders an expungement, the records in question are typically sealed or destroyed. What would that mean in the case of a set of resolutions the House has passed? The idea that the text of the resolutions would be stricken from future copies of the Congressional Record, say, or pulled down from public-facing websites seems unlikely.

In a June 2023 opinion piece published by The Independent, Benedict Cosgrove wrote,

Impeachment ... has the trappings of a judicial proceeding. And if criminal charges can be expunged from civilian records, one can see why Republicans embrace a kind of legal magical thinking in their efforts to legitimize what is, ultimately, a political charade.

In making the case that Trump should attempt to have his first impeachment expunged, Alan Dershowitz argued in April 2026 that impeachment is a "quasi-judicial procedure," therefore it might be possible to return the matter, "back to Congress and ask them to expunge," or to ask the judicial branch to expunge it.

=== Possible impacts on public perception ===
A 2026 article by three writers for The Wall Street Journal opined that while an expungement resolution would, "would have little legal significance,…according to experts," it still "would allow Trump to claim a symbolic victory on a matter that has dogged him since his first term, [as] part of a broader effort [by Trump] to burnish his presidential legacy."

etown Law professor David Super speculated that expungements would be ineffective at removing memory of the impeachments from Americans' minds, remarking, "We all know what happened. We saw it on TV. It's memorialized on the internet." University of Texas at Austin professor of law and government Jeffery Abramson similarly opined that the such a resolution would not alter the historians' and the public's awareness that Trump had been impeached, remarking,

For the House to expunge Trump's impeachment would have no practical effect, since it would still leave in the history books the Senate trials of those impeachments and the not guilty verdicts. This is not the old Soviet Union. You do not erase history.

In July 2023, historian Joshua Zeitz wrote an article that published by Politico which noted that despite the vote to expunge Jackson's censure, historians, [still] remember Jackson as the first president to face congressional rebuke for his conduct." Zeitz opined that Jackson's censure expungement vote provides historical evidence that such an "expungement" vote does not remove a previous congressional action from historical legitimacy, concluding, "once impeached – or, in this case, twice – a president cannot be un-impeached. The original act lives on in public memory – through news articles, history books".

In June 2023, Eugene Robinson of The Washington Post wrote that the effort to expunge Trump's impeachments, "would be laughable if not so dangerous":

The aim appears to be to allow Trump, the likely GOP presidential nominee in next year's election, to claim that despite the events we all witnessed, he was never impeached at all. That lie can then become part of the fake historical record he sells to his supporters.

In June 2023, writing that "it is not at all clear that [expungement] can actually be done," the editorial board of The Fresno Bee characterized the effort as an, "attempted whitewashing of Trump's soiled record as the only chief executive to ever be impeached twice," and criticized Kevin McCarthy (whose district represented part of Fresno) for supporting the effort.

In June 2023, Amanda Marcotte of Salon opined that an expungement vote would be part of a Republican Party "war on history". Charlie Sykes of The Bulwark characterized such a resolution as being an effort at "gaslighting" the public into believing that the impeachments never happened. Lisa Mascaro of the Associated Press characterized the proposal to expunge Trump's impeachments as the "latest [effort] by Trump's allies to rewrite the narrative of the defeated president's tenure in office as he seeks another term in the White House," and characterized McCarthy's support of it as highlighting the political pressure that McCarthy was receiving from right-wing Republicans. In July 2023, Austin Sarat of Solon opined that while the effort to expunge the impeachment's would most likely not be effective at making Americans forget about them, "that does not make the MAGA desire to cleanse history of facts any less troubling or perilous."
