= Censure of Andrew Jackson =

Formal condemnation of Andrew Jackson

On March 28, 1834, the United States Senate voted to censure U.S. president Andrew Jackson over his actions to remove federal deposits from the Second Bank of the United States and his firing of Secretary of the Treasury William J. Duane in order to do so. Jackson was a Democrat, and the censure was passed by the Senate while under a Whig majority. In 1837, when the Senate had a Democratic majority, the then-lame duck president's party voted to "expunge" Jackson's censure.

This is the only time in which the U.S. Senate has censured a president. The censure of Andrew Jackson "remains the clearest case of presidential censure by resolution" in either chamber of the United States Congress, as no other president has had an explicit censure resolution adopted against them.

== Background ==
=== Censures ===
A censure is a formal statement of disapproval issued by a group, such as a legislative body.

Presidential censure is not explicitly provided for in the Constitution of the United States, which does not even use the term "censure". Article One Section 5 Clause 2 does permit that, "each House may determine the Rules of its Proceedings, punish its Members for disorderly behavior, and, with the Concurrence of two thirds, expel a Member," which can be seen as permitting for censure by the chambers of the United States Congress of their own members. However, nothing in the United States Constitution explicitly outlines the ability for such action to be taken by a chamber of the United States Congress against individuals not belonging to that chamber. Despite the term "censure" not appearing in the United States Constitution, the chambers of the United States Congress adopted rules permitting such punishment, which voices condemnation without having further consequence such as expulsion or removal from office.

=== Bank War ===
Political conflict arose over the opposition of President Andrew Jackson to the existence of the Second Bank of the United States. In 1829, in his first annual message to the United States Congress, Jackson criticized the bank. Jackson believed that the bank was unconstitutional and worried about its centralization of financial influence. He believed it favored the elites over farmers and laborers. In 1832, he successfully vetoed a bill to recharter the bank. However, the bank still had a charter that would not expire until 1836. In 1833, Jackson had federal deposits withdrawn from the bank, causing great political controversy. In order to do this, on September 23, 1833, Jackson had dismissed Secretary of the Treasury William J. Duane, who had refused orders to do this, and in his place made the recess appointment of Roger Taney as secretary of the treasury.

== Censure vote ==
In response to Jackson's actions, the Whig-controlled Senate expressed its disapproval by censuring him.

The Congress reconvened in December 1833, at which point Henry Clay introduced a two-part resolution which, in its first part, asserted that Jackson had

Assumed the exercise of a power over the Treasury of the United States not granted him by the Constitution and laws.

In its second part, this resolution asserted that Congress held a role in overseeing the nation's deposits and that the reason Taney had provided for removing federal deposits was "unsatisfactory and insufficient". Therefore, the reason given to censure was both the removal of the deposits and the dismissal of Duane.

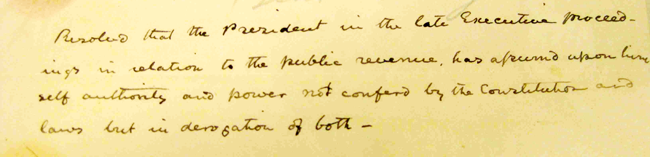
Henry Clay's final draft of the revised resolution censuring President Jackson

The proposed censure was backed by Daniel Webster and John C. Calhoun. It was debated over a period of ten weeks. Clay, leading the effort to censure, described Jackson as a "backwoods Caesar" and his administration a "military dictatorship". Jackson would retaliate by calling Clay as "reckless and as full of fury as a drunken man in a brothel". The Senate ultimately adopted a revised censure resolution on March 28, 1834, and Jackson was thereby officially censured for violating the Constitution in a vote of 26–20. The full adopted resolution read,

Resolved, That the President, in the late Executive proceedings in relation to the public revenue, has assumed upon himself authority and power not conferred by the Constitution and laws, but in derogation of both.

While the charge could be considered an impeachable offense, only the House of Representatives could initiate an impeachment. Jackson alleged that the censure was unconstitutional because it amounted to the Senate acting beyond their authority by charging him with an impeachable offense.

The opposing parties accused each other of lacking credentials to represent the people. Jacksonian Democrats argued that the senators were beholden to the state legislatures that selected them; the Whigs pointed out that the president had been chosen by electors and not by direct election. On April 15, 1834, Jackson sent the Senate a lengthy message protesting his censure. In part, Jackson wrote,

The resolution of the Senate is wholly unauthorized by the Constitution, and in derogation of its entire spirit. It assumes that a single branch of the legislative department may for the purposes of a public censure, and without any view to legislation or impeachment, take up, consider, and decide upon the official acts of the Executive. But in no part of the Constitution is the President subjected to any such responsibility, and in no part of that instrument is any such power conferred on either branch of the Legislature.

Censure vote
March 28, 1834	Party			Total votes
March 28, 1834	Democratic/ Jacksonian	Whig/ Anti-Jackson	Nullifier	Total votes
Yea	1	23	2	26
Nay	18	2	0	20
Result: Adopted
Roll call vote on the censure: Senator / Party / State / Vote; Samuel Bell / W / New Hampshire / Absent; Thomas Hart Benton / D / Missouri / Nay; George M. Bibb / D / Kentucky / Yea; John Black / W / Mississippi / Yea; Bedford Brown / D / North Carolina / Nay; John C. Calhoun / N / South Carolina / Yea; Ezekiel F. Chambers / W / Maryland / Absent; Henry Clay / W / Kentucky / Yea; John M. Clayton / W / Delaware / Yea; Thomas Ewing / W / Ohio / Yea; John Forsyth / D / Georgia / Nay; Theodore Frelinghuysen / W / New Jersey / Yea; Felix Grundy / D / Tennessee / Nay; William Hendricks / W / Indiana / Nay; Isaac Hill / D / New Hampshire / Nay; Elias Kane / D / Illinois / Nay; Joseph Kent / W / Maryland / Yea; John Pendleton King / D / Georgia / Nay; William R. King / D / Alabama / Nay; Nehemiah R. Knight / W / Rhode Island / Yea; Benjamin W. Leigh / W / Virginia / Yea; Lewis F. Linn / D / Missouri / Nay; Willie P. Mangum / W / North Carolina / Yea; Gabriel Moore / W / Alabama / Nay; Thomas Morris / D / Ohio / Nay; Samuel McKean / D / Pennsylvania / Nay; Arnold Naudain / W / Delaware / Yea; George Poindexter / W / Mississippi / Yea; Alexander Porter / W / Louisiana / Yea; Samuel Prentiss / W / Vermont / Yea; William C. Preston / N / South Carolina / Yea; Asher Robbins / W / Rhode Island / Yea; John McCracken Robinson / D / Illinois / Nay; Ether Shepley / D / Maine / Nay; Nathaniel Silsbee / W / Massachusetts / Yea; Nathan Smith / W / Connecticut / Yea; Samuel L. Southard / W / New Jersey / Yea; Peleg Sprague / W / Maine / Yea; Benjamin Swift / W / Vermont / Yea; Nathaniel P. Tallmadge / D / New York / Nay; John Tipton / D / Indiana / Nay; Gideon Tomlinson / W / Connecticut / Yea; John Tyler / W / Virginia / Yea; George A. Waggaman / W / Louisiana / Yea; Daniel Webster / W / Massachusetts / Yea; Hugh Lawson White / D / Tennessee / Nay; William Wilkins / D / Pennsylvania / Nay; Silas Wright / D / New York / Nay; Source:

== Expungement vote ==
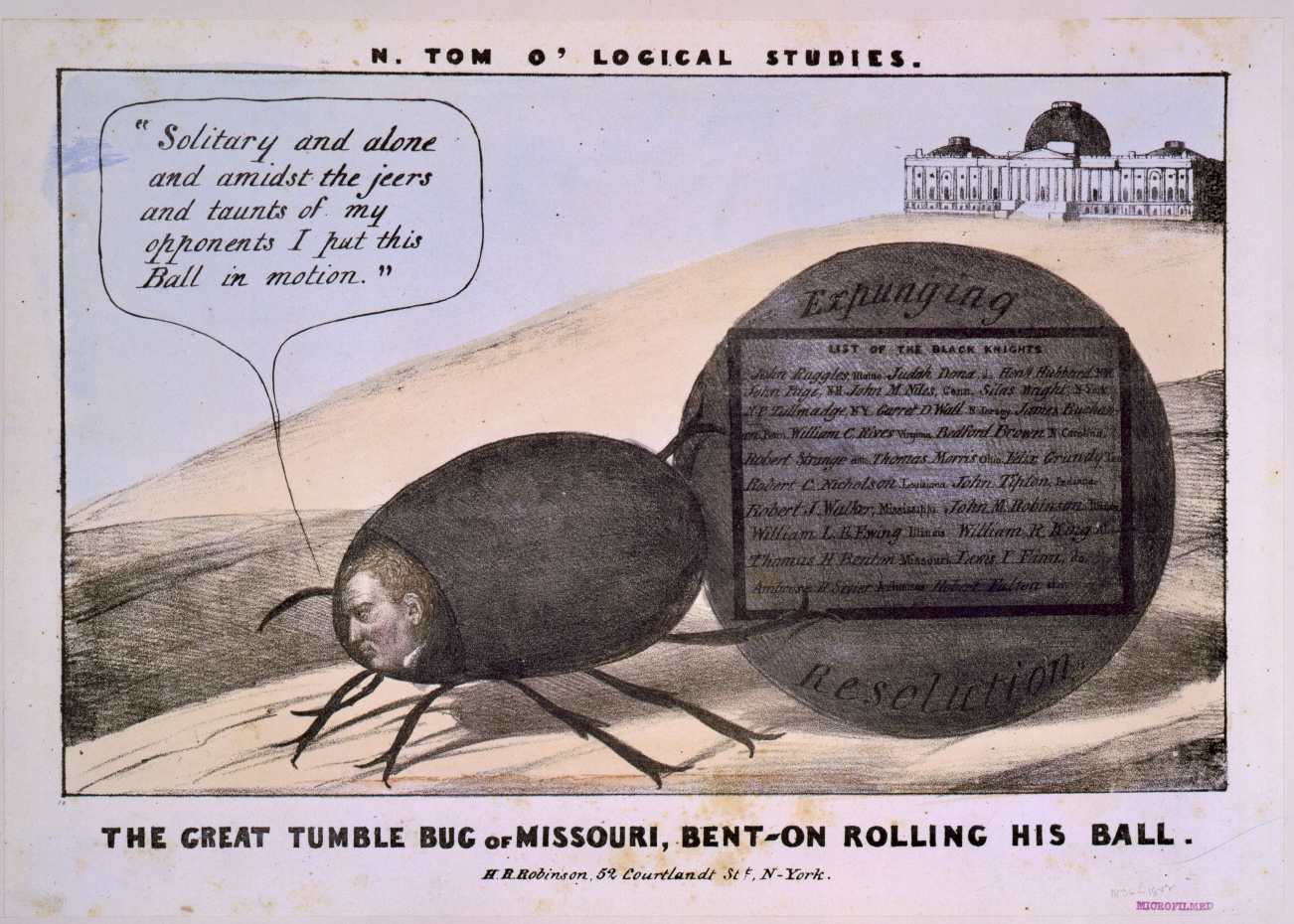
"The great tumble bug of Missouri, bent-on rollin his ball", an 1837 political cartoon depicting Senator Thomas Hart Benton as a dung beetle, rolling the expungement resolution uphill toward the U.S. Capitol building

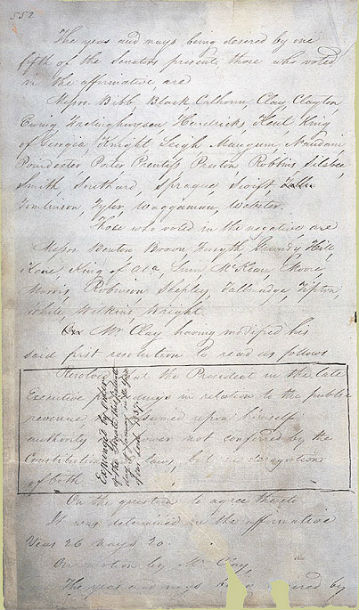
Handwritten legislative Journal of the United States Senate with a notation indicating that the 1834 censure of President Jackson had been "expunged by the Senate"

For years, Senator Thomas Hart Benton, an ally of Jackson, had attempted to have the motion expunged. However, this effort was to no avail until 1837, when the Democratic Party held a majority in the Senate. Benton first introduced a resolution to expunge the censure on June 30, 1834. He thereafter reintroduced it each new session of Congress.

Despite its initial defeats, support for Benton's resolution ultimately emerged as a major test of party loyalty among Democrats. Proponents of expungement attempted to get state legislatures to pass resolutions "instructing" that the state's senators either vote for expungement or resign their seats. Whigs argued that state legislatures would have no such authority to instruct their senators. The campaign advocating for expungement stumbled for a time, but began to gather momentum after Virginia passed a measure in January 1836 instructing its senators to vote to expunge.

In January 1837, Benton again introduced a resolution to expunge Jackson's censure from the Senate record. Thirteen consecutive hours of debate were held on the resolution before the Senate voted 25–19 to expunge the censure.

Weeks after the expungement vote, the secretary of the Senate retrieved the original manuscript journal of the Senate and opened it to March 28, 1834, the day that the censure was applied. In accordance with the expungement resolution, he drew black lines around the text recording the censure and atop of the text wrote: "Expunged by order of the Senate, this sixteenth day of January in the year of our Lord, 1837". Thereafter, Jackson hosted a large dinner for the "expungers".

Steve Benen has observed that, "the point at the time was for partisans to say that the [censure] happened, but for the sake of the historical record, it didn’t really count." Presidential historian Laura Ellyn Smith wrote of the decision to vote to expunge Jackson's censure,

This decision reflected the power of Jackson’s cult of personality, as his congressional allies sought to show reverence and please the outgoing president, regardless of his past actions. Despite being merely symbolic, the censure had always bothered Jackson, and so his political friends sought to resolve the issue in an attempt to clear his legacy.

Clay expressed his deep disgust with the expungement vote, remarking, "The Senate is no longer a place for any decent man."

The Senate Historical Office has written of the chaos that erupted in the Senate Chamber after the expungement vote passed,

Pandemonium swept the galleries. When a disgruntled Whig sympathizer ignored the presiding officer’s repeated calls for order, that officer directed the sergeant at arms to arrest the man and haul him onto the Senate floor. After the Senate voted to free the demonstrator, he approached the presiding officer and demanded, “Am I not permitted to speak in my own defense?” The outraged presiding officer ordered him removed from the Chamber and the Senate adjourned amidst the tumult.

Despite this expungement vote, historians still regard Jackson to have been censured. In 2020, Brookings Institution senior fellow in governance studies and George Washington University political science professor Sarah Binder observed that despite the vote to "expunge" his censure, "we still count Andrew Jackson as the only censured president."

Expungement vote
January 17, 1837	Party			Total votes
January 17, 1837	Democratic	Whig	Nullifier	Total votes
Yea	24	0	0	24
Nay	0	17	2	19
Result: Adopted
Roll call vote on the expungement: Senator / Party / State / Vote; Richard H. Bayard / W / Delaware / Nay; Thomas Hart Benton / D / Missouri / Yea; John Black / W / Mississippi / Nay; Bedford Brown / D / North Carolina / Yea; John C. Calhoun / N / South Carolina / Nay; Henry Clay / W / Kentucky / Nay; John J. Crittenden / W / Kentucky / Nay; Alfred Cuthbert / D / Georgia / Absent; Judah Dana / D / Maine / Yea; John Davis / W / Massachusetts / Nay; Thomas Ewing / W / Ohio / Nay; William Lee D. Ewing / D / Illinois / Yea; William S. Fulton / D / Arkansas / Yea; Felix Grundy / D / Tennessee / Yea; William Hendricks / W / Indiana / Nay; Henry Hubbard / D / New Hampshire / Yea; Joseph Kent / W / Maryland / Nay; John Pendleton King / D / Georgia / Yea; William R. King / D / Alabama / Yea; Nehemiah R. Knight / W / Rhode Island / Nay; Lewis F. Linn / D / Missouri / Yea; Gabriel Moore / W / Alabama / Nay; Thomas Morris / D / Ohio / Yea; Samuel McKean / D / Pennsylvania / Absent; Robert C. Nicholas / D / Louisiana / Yea; John Milton Niles / D / Connecticut / Yea; John Page / D / New Hampshire / Yea; Richard E. Parker / D / Virginia / Absent; Samuel Prentiss / W / Vermont / Nay; William C. Preston / N / South Carolina / Nay; William Cabell Rives / D / Virginia / Yea; Asher Robbins / W / Rhode Island / Nay; John McCracken Robinson / D / Illinois / Yea; John Ruggles / D / Maine / Yea; Ambrose Hundley Sevier / D / Arkansas / Yea; Samuel L. Southard / W / New Jersey / Nay; John S. Spence / W / Maryland / Absent; Robert Strange / D / North Carolina / Yea; Benjamin Swift / W / Vermont / Nay; Nathaniel P. Tallmadge / D / New York / Yea; John Tipton / D / Indiana / Yea; Gideon Tomlinson / W / Connecticut / Nay; Robert J. Walker / D / Mississippi / Yea; Garret D. Wall / D / New Jersey / Yea; Daniel Webster / W / Massachusetts / Nay; Hugh Lawson White / W / Tennessee / Nay; Silas Wright / D / New York / Yea; Source:

== Aftermath ==
In 2023, historian Joshua Zeitz wrote that,

The episode hardened political lines in the 1830s and created a vibrant political debate between Democrats, who were comfortable with the exercise of strong executive authority, and Whigs, who, like their English namesakes, feared usurpation by elected and unelected kings who arrogated powers to themselves that should have been reserved for the legislative branch.

In the early 2020s, the expungement vote was pointed to by some supporters of an effort by Republicans to have the United States House of Representatives hold a similar vote intended to "expunge" the two impeachments of Republican former president Donald Trump, with these supporters of that effort regarding it to be a precedent that supports the notion of supposedly-expunging a federal impeachment.

The impeachment of Jackson remains the only time in which the U.S. Senate has censured a president. The censure of Andrew Jackson "remains the clearest case of presidential censure by resolution" in either chamber of the United States Congress, as no other president has had an explicit censure resolution adopted against them.

== See also ==
- Expungement in the United States
