= Jonathan Brash =

British politician

Jonathan Brash MP
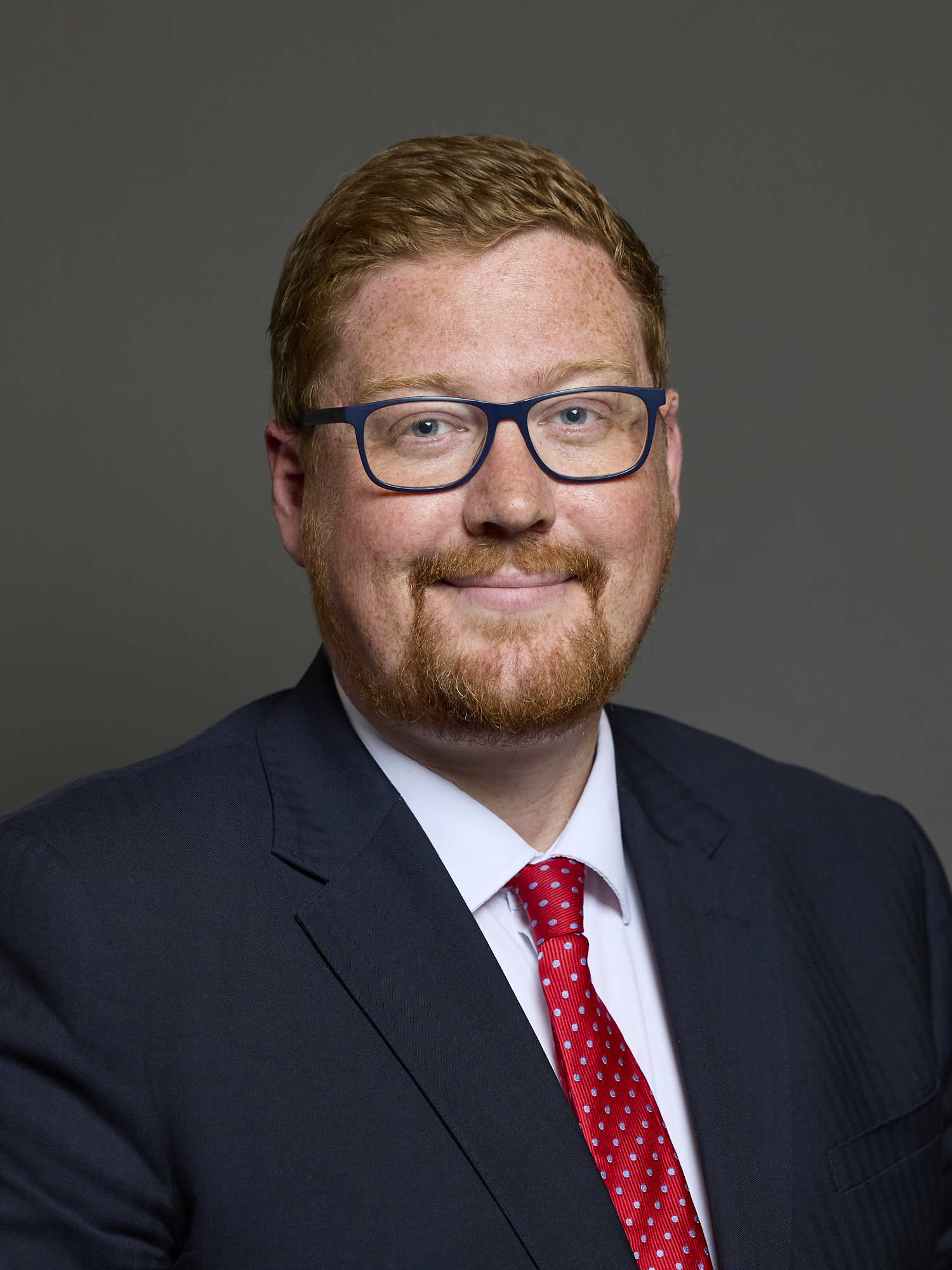
- Official portrait, 2024

Member of Parliament for Hartlepool
- Incumbent
- Assumed office 4 July 2024
- Preceded by: Jill Mortimer
- Majority: 7,698 (21.7%)

Personal details
- Born: Jonathan James Frederick Brash
- Party: Labour
- Other political affiliations: Blue Labour
- Spouse: Pamela
- Occupation: Politician; Teacher

Jonathan James Frederick Brash is a British Labour Party politician and former private school teacher who has been Member of Parliament (MP) for Hartlepool since 2024. He gained the seat from Jill Mortimer, a Conservative.

== Early career ==
Brash was Head of Psychology at the Independent Yarm School. He also taught at Newcastle School for Boys and was the Chairman of Hartlepool Sixth Form College.

== Political career ==
In 2006, Brash became councillor for the Burn Valley ward in Hartlepool. He later left the Labour Party to become an Independent Councillor, and stood down from the Council in 2016. Brash returned to the same role of councillor for the Labour Party in 2021.

In the 2024 general election, Brash was elected as MP of Hartlepool. He received 46.2% of the vote and gained the seat from Jill Mortimer.

On 11 August 2024, Brash announced that he was going to stand down as councillor so that he could focus on the role of MP. In a statement, he said: "Being an MP is a full-time job and now that the dust has settled on last month’s General Election, it’s the right time to step down as a councillor."

In Parliament, Brash Chairs the All Party Parliamentary Groups on Swimming and Council Tax Reform.

In June 2025, Brash joined over 120 fellow Labour MPs in signing a reasoned amendment to the Government's controversial welfare reform bill, citing concerns that the bill would knowingly push many into poverty. The government went on to abandon parts of the proposal as a result of the impending rebellion.

On 9 May 2026, he called on Keir Starmer to resign following the 2026 United Kingdom local elections.

He is a member of the Blue Labour caucus of Labour MPs.

== Personal life ==
Brash is married to Pamela Hargreaves. He is a fan of Hartlepool United.

Parliament of the United Kingdom
Preceded by Jill Mortimer	Member of Parliament for Hartlepool; 2024–present	Incumbent
