= Reasoned amendment =

Parliamentary process to halt the proceeding of legislation

In Westminster Parliaments, a reasoned amendment is an amendment to the wording of the motion on the reading of a bill, which turns the motion from one progressing the bill into one rejecting it. It is sometimes called a wrecking amendment, but the term wrecking amendment more often denotes a type of amendment to the bill itself, rather than to a motion on reading the bill. The term "reasoned amendment" reflects the fact that the amended motion specifies reasons for rejecting the bill.

== Outline ==
Consider the second reading in the House of Commons of the United Kingdom of a bill which has 200 supporters and 300 opponents.

A typical process with no reasoned amendment might be:

- A supporter of the bill proposes the motion "That the Bill be now read a second time"
- Debate proceeds on the merits of the bill
- The house votes on the motion: Ayes 200, Noes 300
- Because the motion is defeated, the bill is rejected

The corresponding process with a reasoned amendment might be:

- A supporter of the bill proposes the [main] motion "That the Bill be now read a second time"
- An opponent of the bill proposes a motion to amend the main motion to "That this House declines to give the [Name] Bill a Second Reading because [reasons]"
- Debate proceeds on the merits of the bill
- The house votes on the motion to amend: Ayes 300, Noes 200
- The house votes on the amended main motion: Ayes 300, Noes 200
- Because the amended main motion is accepted, the bill is rejected.

With no reasoned amendment, the precise reasons for the bill's rejection may be inferred by reviewing the transcript in Hansard, but are not formally recorded in the Journal of the House of Commons. With a reasoned amendment, the motion recorded in the Journal will give the reasons.

For instance, in 1998 the House of Lords passed the following reasoned amendment:

Leave out all the words after "That" and insert "this House declines to give the European Parliamentary Elections Bill a Second Reading on the grounds that it includes an undemocratic 'closed list' system providing for the selection of MEPs by party choice, an approach which would end the historic right of the British people to choose the candidates they wish to be elected, a step for which the House notes with great concern no mandate was sought or given at the last general election".

In this case, the Commons invoked the Parliament Acts 1911 and 1949 to override the Lords' rejection of the bill, which later became law as the European Parliamentary Elections Act 1999.

== Worldwide use ==
In the Australian Parliament a reasoned amendment may be moved during the second reading of a bill which would allow debate to be extended or allow the member moving the amendment to register their opposition.

== This day six months ==
An older form of rejection amendment is replacing the word "now" in the motion "that the Bill be now read a second time" with "upon this day six months" or "upon this day three months". This type of amendment, which has now fallen into disuse, is a legal fiction and is deemed by Erskine May: Parliamentary Practice as equivalent to a motion not granting the Bill a second reading at all.

In Canada such an amendment is called a hoist amendment. In 1999 Gildas Molgat said "Nowadays, it is more often used to prolong debate since it allows those who have already spoken on the main motion an opportunity to speak again".

== See also ==
- Objection to the consideration of a question
- Postpone indefinitely
