= Iain Wright =

British politician (born 1972)

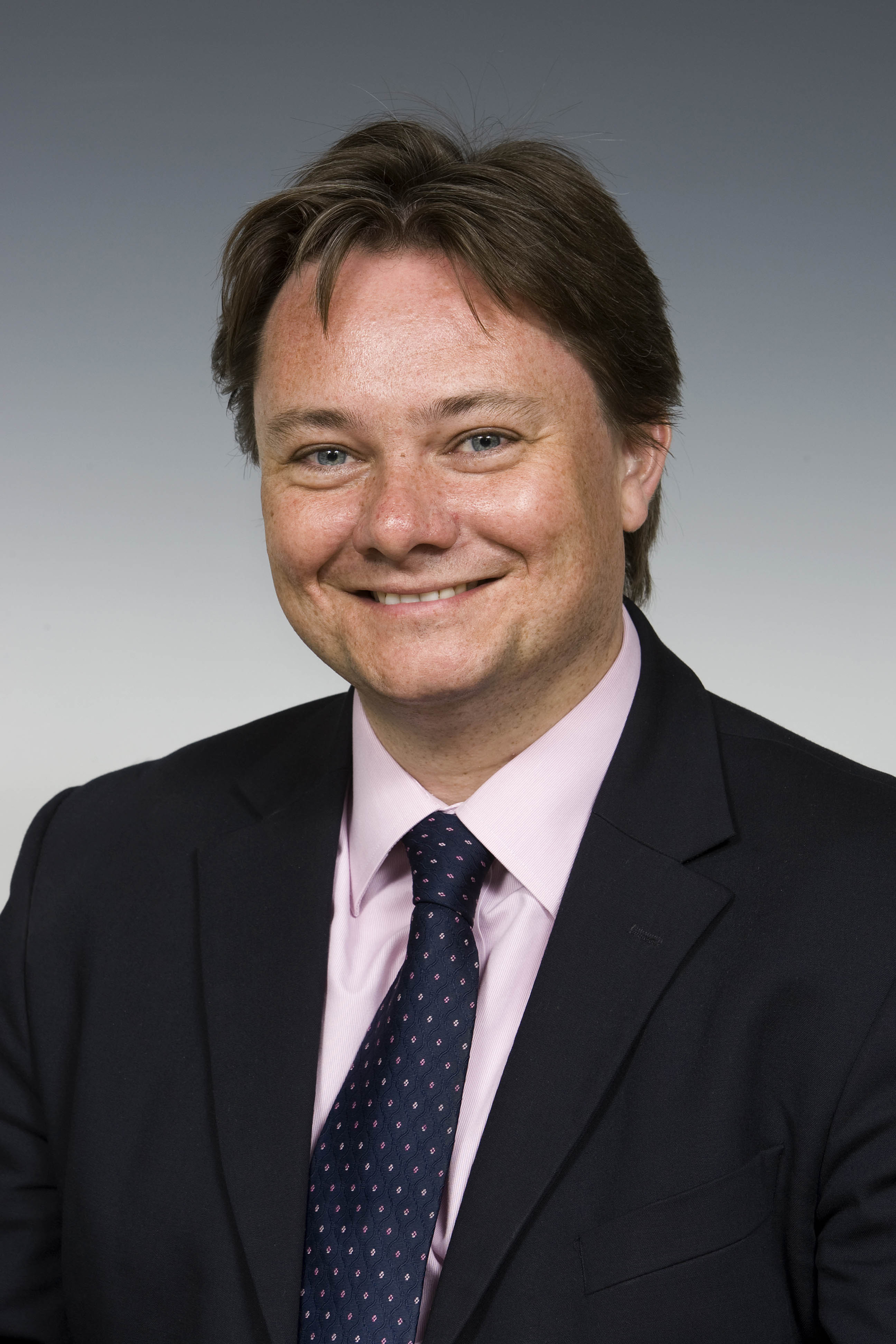
- Official portrait, 2009

Chairman of the Business, Innovation and Skills Select Committee
- In office 18 June 2015 – 12 July 2017
- Preceded by: Adrian Bailey
- Succeeded by: Rachel Reeves

Parliamentary Under Secretary of State for 14-19 Reform and Apprenticeships
- In office 9 June 2009 – 11 May 2010
- Prime Minister: Gordon Brown
- Preceded by: Sarah McCarthy-Fry (as PUS for Schools and Learners)

Member of Parliament for Hartlepool
- In office 30 September 2004 – 3 May 2017
- Preceded by: Peter Mandelson
- Succeeded by: Mike Hill

Personal details
- Born: Iain David Wright; 9 May 1972 (age 54) Hartlepool, County Durham, England
- Party: Labour
- Spouse: Tiffiny Wright
- Education: University College London

Iain David Wright (born 9 May 1972) is a British Labour Party politician who was the Member of Parliament (MP) for Hartlepool from the 2004 Hartlepool by-election until 2017, and served also as the Chairman of Business Innovation and Skills Committee. He was previously Parliamentary Under-Secretary of State with responsibility for apprenticeships, and 14 to 19 reform in the Department for Children, Schools and Families until 11 May 2010.

In April 2017, he announced that he would not be seeking re-election at the snap election of 2017.

== Early life ==
Wright was born in Hartlepool and graduated with a BA in 1994, and MA in 1995 in History from University College London. That year, he joined the Labour Party and was elected as an officer of Cleveland and Richmond Young Labour. He worked as a chartered accountant for Deloitte & Touche from 1996 to 2003, and for the One NorthEast RDA from 2003 to 2004, prior to his election to Parliament.

He was elected as a councillor for the Rift House ward of Hartlepool Borough Council in 2002, and a served on the council's Cabinet with responsibility for performance management.

== Parliamentary career ==
He was the only Hartlepool member on the shortlist when Peter Mandelson stepped down as Labour MP for the town in September 2004, and was easily selected as the Labour Party candidate for the by-election.

During the later stages of the campaign, three local members, one of whom featured in Conservative Party leaflets and another of whom had earlier failed to win the nomination, were reported in the Guardian (which subsequently endorsed Liberal Democrat rival Jody Dunn) to have been unhappy that no other local candidate had been available.

The Labour Party dismissed the claims as having come from the "usual suspects". One subsequently apologised, and another was expelled.

During the campaign, Wright highlighted the Labour government's controversial policies for tackling anti-social behaviour as well as the Liberal Democrats' refusal to support such measures in Parliament and stressed his local origins, in contrast to his main rival's. On polling day (30 September 2004), Wright was elected with a majority of 2,033, reduced from Mandelson's majority of 14,571.

The campaign was unusually long for British by-elections, effectively having begun on 22 July (the day Peter Mandelson announced his intention to become a European Commissioner), seventy-one days before polling day itself.

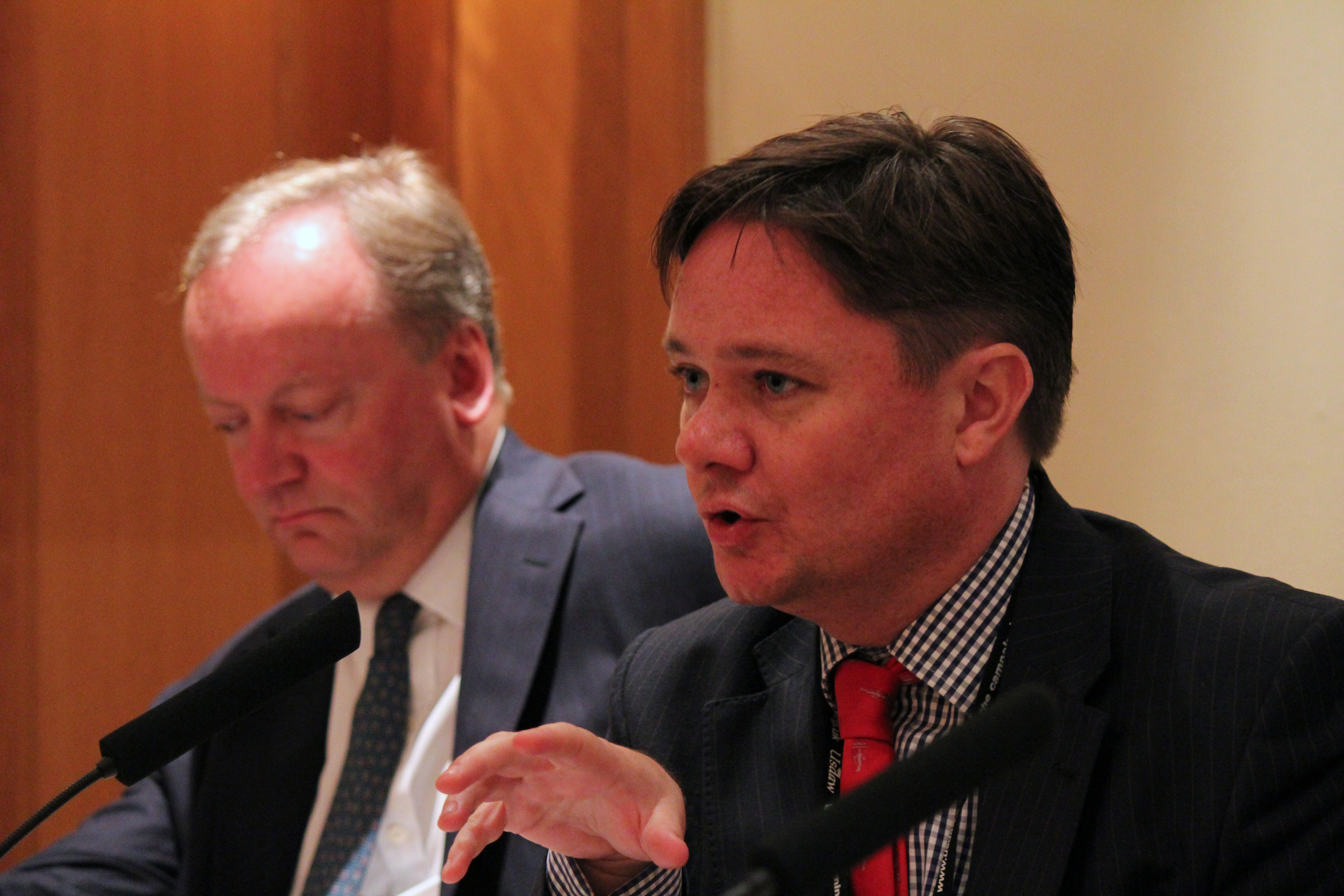
Wright speaking in 2013

His first act as an MP was to actively campaign for the proposed North East Regional Assembly, in the referendum held in November 2004. The proposal for an assembly was rejected by 78% to 22%.

Wright was re-elected at the 2005 General Election, with an increased majority of 7,478 votes. In June 2005, he was appointed as Parliamentary Private Secretary to Health Minister Rosie Winterton, a role he resigned from on 7 September 2006.

In 2006, he became Chairman of Labour Friends of Israel. He returned to Government in July 2007, as Parliamentary Under-Secretary of State in the Department for Communities and Local Government, before moving to the Department for Children, Schools and Families in the frontbench reshuffle of June 2009.

In May 2009, during the MP's expenses row, Wright and fellow Labour MP Tom Watson were criticised by the Daily Telegraph for "lavishing" £100,000 on a "shared Central London crash pad".

Wright and Watson claimed the legal fees for buying the property and the following year claimed £1,431.46 legal fees for buying the freehold, which significantly enhanced the property value. Rules at the time did not require them to reimburse any profits made on the sale of the property.

In response, Wright said "As a new MP, I purchased furniture and electrical equipment once I was in the process of purchasing a half share of a small two bedroom flat in London." His expenses for 2008 to 2009 were £136,725 and ranked 489 out of 647 MPs. The Legg Report stated that he was reimbursed £805.97 for an extra month mortgage interest during 2006 to 2007, which he subsequently repaid.

At the 2015 General Election, Wright's majority was cut to 3,024 votes by UKIP candidate Phillip Broughton. On 19 June 2015, he was announced as having been elected to the chairmanship of the Business, Innovation and Skills Select Committee. He supported Owen Smith in the 2016 Labour Party (UK) leadership election. On 19 April 2017, he announced his intention not to stand for re-election at the snap election, scheduled for Thursday 8 June 2017.

== Charity work ==
Wright completed the 2011 Great North Run in aid of the Stroke Association. He joined his son Benjamin, 17, on the half marathon. The pair ran in aid of the Stroke Association, a cause which has been close to their hearts, since Ben suffered a serious stroke in 2006. Wright completed the course in his personal best time of two hours and fifty minutes, with Ben achieving a time of two hours, thirty minutes.

Wright has also supported Whizz-Kidz, a charity for disabled children.

Parliament of the United Kingdom
Preceded by Peter Mandelson	Member of Parliament for Hartlepool; 2004–2017	Succeeded by Mike Hill
