= 2004 Hartlepool by-election =

UK Parliament by-election

- 30 September 2004

Hartlepool parliamentary seat
- Turnout: 45.8% (▼10.0%)
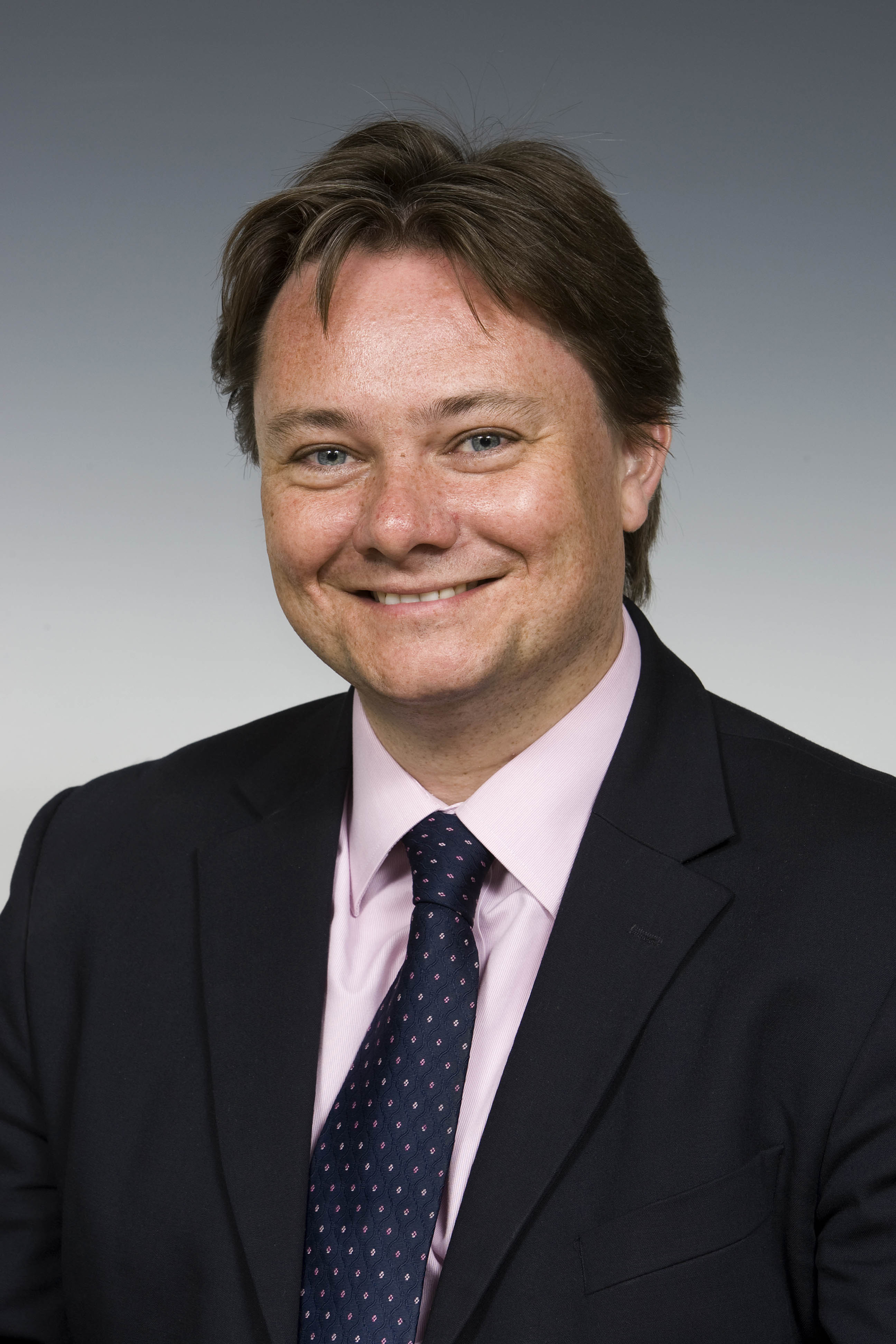

	First party	Second party
Candidate	Iain Wright	Jody Dunn
Party	Labour	Liberal Democrats
Popular vote	12,752	10,719
Percentage	40.7%	34.2%
Swing	▼18.5%	▲19.2%
	Third party	Fourth party
Candidate	Stephen Allison	Jeremy Middleton
Party	UKIP	Conservative
Popular vote	3,193	3,044
Percentage	10.2%	9.7%
Swing	New	▼11.1%
MP before election
Peter Mandelson
Labour
Subsequent MP
Iain Wright
Labour

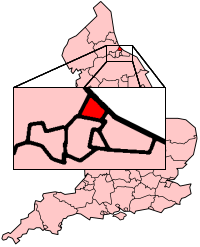
Location of Hartlepool constituency

A by-election for the United Kingdom parliamentary constituency of Hartlepool was held on 30 September 2004, triggered by the resignation of incumbent Labour Party MP Peter Mandelson, who was nominated as the United Kingdom's new European Commissioner for Trade. It was won by Iain Wright, who held the seat for Labour albeit with a significantly reduced majority.

== Background ==
Peter Mandelson, the sitting MP, who was nominated as the United Kingdom's new European Commissioner for Trade on 23 July 2004. To take up his new position, he resigned on 8 September by accepting the office of Steward of the Manor of Northstead, thereby disqualifying himself from Parliament, and causing a by-election.

== Result ==
Out of a registered electorate of 68,517, there were 31,362 valid votes, making a turnout of 45.77%. This was the highest by-election turnout since the Romsey by-election in May 2000. The Labour Party candidate Iain Wright won the seat with a majority of 2,033, a substantially reduced majority. The Liberal Democrat vote more than doubled, leaving that party a close second. The United Kingdom Independence Party (UKIP) held its deposit, and beat the Conservative Party into fourth place.

This marked the first time UKIP had come third in a by-election (and followed a successful European election in June 2004, in which countrywide it had come third and won twelve seats). It would be over six years before the party improved on this position, when it took second place at Barnsley Central in 2011. It would go on to win a by-election for the first time a little over a decade after the Hartlepool contest, in Clacton in October 2014.

The Conservative vote in Hartlepool dropped considerably, leaving the party in fourth place for the first time in an English by-election since Liverpool Walton in 1991.

2004 Hartlepool by-election
Party	Candidate	Votes	%	±%
Labour	Iain Wright	12,752	40.7	–18.5
Liberal Democrats	Jody Dunn	10,719	34.2	+19.2
UKIP	Stephen Allison	3,193	10.2	N/A
Conservative	Jeremy Middleton	3,044	9.7	–11.1
Respect	John Bloom	572	1.8	N/A
Green	Iris Ryder	255	0.8	N/A
National Front	John Starkey	246	0.8	N/A
Independent	Paul Watson	139	0.4	N/A
Socialist Labour	Christopher Herriot	95	0.3	–2.1
Common Good	Dick Rodgers	91	0.3	N/A
Independent	Philip Berriman	90	0.3	N/A
Monster Raving Loony	Alan Hope	80	0.3	N/A
Independent (Rainbow)	Ronnie Carroll	45	0.1	N/A
English Democrat	Ed Abrams	41	0.1	N/A
Majority		2,033	6.5	–31.7
Turnout		31,362	45.8	–10.0
Labour hold		Swing	-11.5	

Robert Kilroy-Silk of UKIP initially suggested he might stand but later ruled this out, as did Hartlepool and Middlesbrough mayors Stuart Drummond and Ray Mallon.

Preceding by-elections had seen the Liberal Democrats come from third place to beat the Conservative Party, and in Brent East and Leicester South take seats from Labour. The seat was safer (judging by the 2001 result) than Leicester but was vulnerable to swings such as achieved in Brent, or in Birmingham Hodge Hill where the Liberal Democrats narrowly failed to win.

In the event, the Liberal Democrats were not quite able to repeat these performances. Their campaign suffered from the choice of a candidate who was not from Hartlepool, while the Labour candidate had been born and brought up in the town.

In addition, the Liberal Democrat candidate made reference, on a campaign blog, to having canvassed a street where everyone she met "was either drunk, flanked by an angry dog, or undressed"; this happened despite a Liberal Democrat minder, Ed Fordham, having been appointed by the party's Campaigns Department to proof read Dunn's blog before any posts went up. Fordham removed a reference to some of the people canvassed being Labour supporters, but he thought the rest of the comment was fine.

Labour gave wide publicity to this remark and asserted that it was an insult to the people of Hartlepool. Dunn defended her remarks on the Today programme, in a performance that was perceived to be unconvincing, so Labour Party vans toured the constituency playing her Today interview on loudspeakers.

Hartlepool had no significant ethnic minority vote, unlike the other three by-elections. The Liberal Democrats were nevertheless content to claim the large swing to them, and the Conservatives' fourth place established the Liberal Democrats as the main opposition party to Labour in the seat. UKIP did well with a local candidate, and its message of opposition to European Union fishing rules was a popular one in a port town.

The Conservative Party dropped from second place at the 2001 general election to fourth place, its worst place in an English by-election since 1991.

Labour believed its performance good, for it came at the end of a very long campaign (effectively seventy-one days), and with a swing markedly smaller than in other seats over the previous year; the party also regarded the result – along with that in Hodge Hill – as a vindication of its decision to aggressively attack the Liberal Democrats and essentially ignore the Conservative challenge.

== Previous result ==
From the 2001 general election.

General election 2001: Hartlepool
Party	Candidate	Votes	%	±%
Labour	Peter Mandelson	22,506	59.1	–1.6
Conservative	Gus Robinson	7,935	20.9	–0.5
Liberal Democrats	Nigel Boddy	5,717	15.0	+1.0
Socialist Labour	Arthur Scargill	912	2.4	N/A
Independent	Ian Cameron	557	1.5	N/A
Independent	John Booth	424	1.1	N/A
Majority		14,571	38.2	−1.2
Turnout		38,051	55.8	–9.8
Labour hold		Swing		

== See also ==
- 2021 Hartlepool by-election
