= Mike Hill (British politician) =

British politician (born 1963)

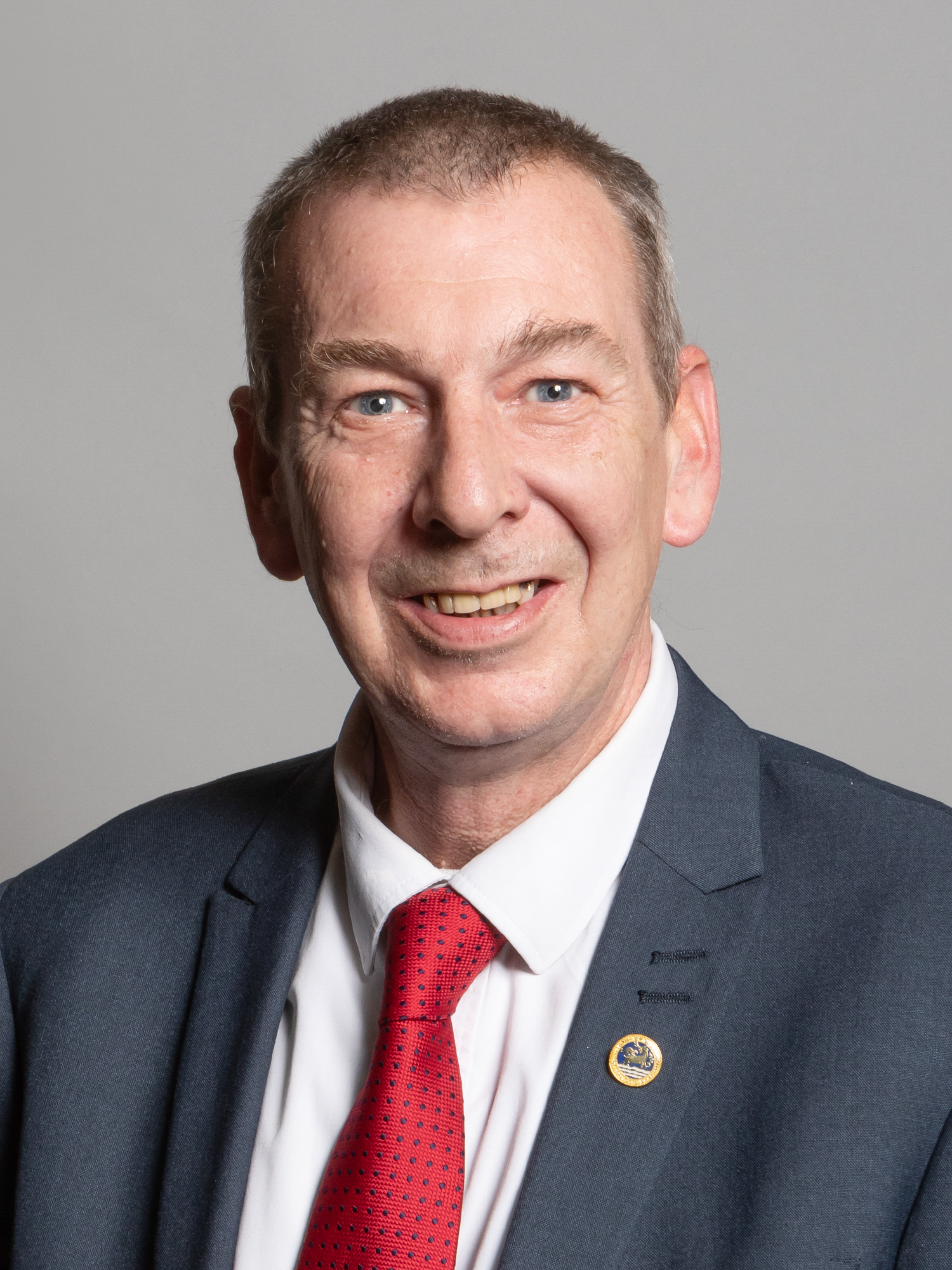

Member of Parliament for Hartlepool
- In office 8 June 2017 – 16 March 2021
- Preceded by: Iain Wright
- Succeeded by: Jill Mortimer

Personal details
- Born: Michael Robert Hill; 12 May 1963 (age 63) Heywood, Lancashire, England
- Party: Labour
- Education: University of Lancaster

Michael Robert Hill (born 12 May 1963) is a former British Labour Party politician who served as Member of Parliament for Hartlepool from 2017 until his resignation in 2021.

== Early life ==
Hill was born in Heywood in Lancashire in 1963.

He attended Sutherland High School (which became Heywood Community High School in 1990). He has a degree in Drama and English Literature.

== Career ==
Hill has worked in local authority libraries and as a trade union official. Until being elected to Parliament in 2017, he was the Political Officer for UNISON Northern Region and Vice Chair of Labour North.

He was the unsuccessful Labour candidate for Richmond in North Yorkshire at the 2015 election, which has traditionally been a safe seat for the Conservatives. He came third behind the UKIP candidate. In 2017, upon the retirement of Labour MP Iain Wright, Hill was selected as Labour's candidate for Hartlepool, a Tees Valley seat the party had held for several decades. Hill had lived in the town of Hartlepool for nearly twenty years. He successfully retained the seat at the 2017 general election.

Hill retained his seat at the 2019 general election. He later supported Keir Starmer in the 2020 Labour leadership election and Angela Rayner for the deputy leadership.

== Resignation and sexual misconduct allegations ==
Hill was suspended from the Labour Party in September 2019 over allegations of sexual harassment, but reinstated in October 2019. In January 2020, his request for anonymity was turned down in an upcoming employment tribunal related to the accusations. The alleged victim stated that she had also made a report to the Metropolitan Police at the time of the original accusations.

On 16 March 2021, Hill announced his resignation with immediate effect and was appointed Crown Steward and Bailiff of the Chiltern Hundreds, which is the procedure whereby a UK MP—who cannot actually resign—voluntarily leaves office. This was after the Independent Expert Panel (IEP) had found that Hill breached Parliament's sexual misconduct policy.

In the resulting by-election, Hill's Hartlepool seat was won by the Conservative candidate, Jill Mortimer.

The sexual misconduct claims were considered by the Central London Employment Tribunal in May 2021. The claimant alleged that Hill used a staffing review as a pretext for making her redundant after she had rejected his sexual advances. In July 2021, the tribunal in delivering its decision held that Hill had assaulted, harassed, and victimised a parliamentary worker and it upheld claims of "detrimental treatment". In May 2022, an employment tribunal ordered Hill to pay £434,435 in compensation to the woman concerned.

Parliament of the United Kingdom
Preceded by Iain Wright	Member of Parliament for Hartlepool; 2017–2021	Succeeded by Jill Mortimer
