= Jill Mortimer =

British Conservative politician

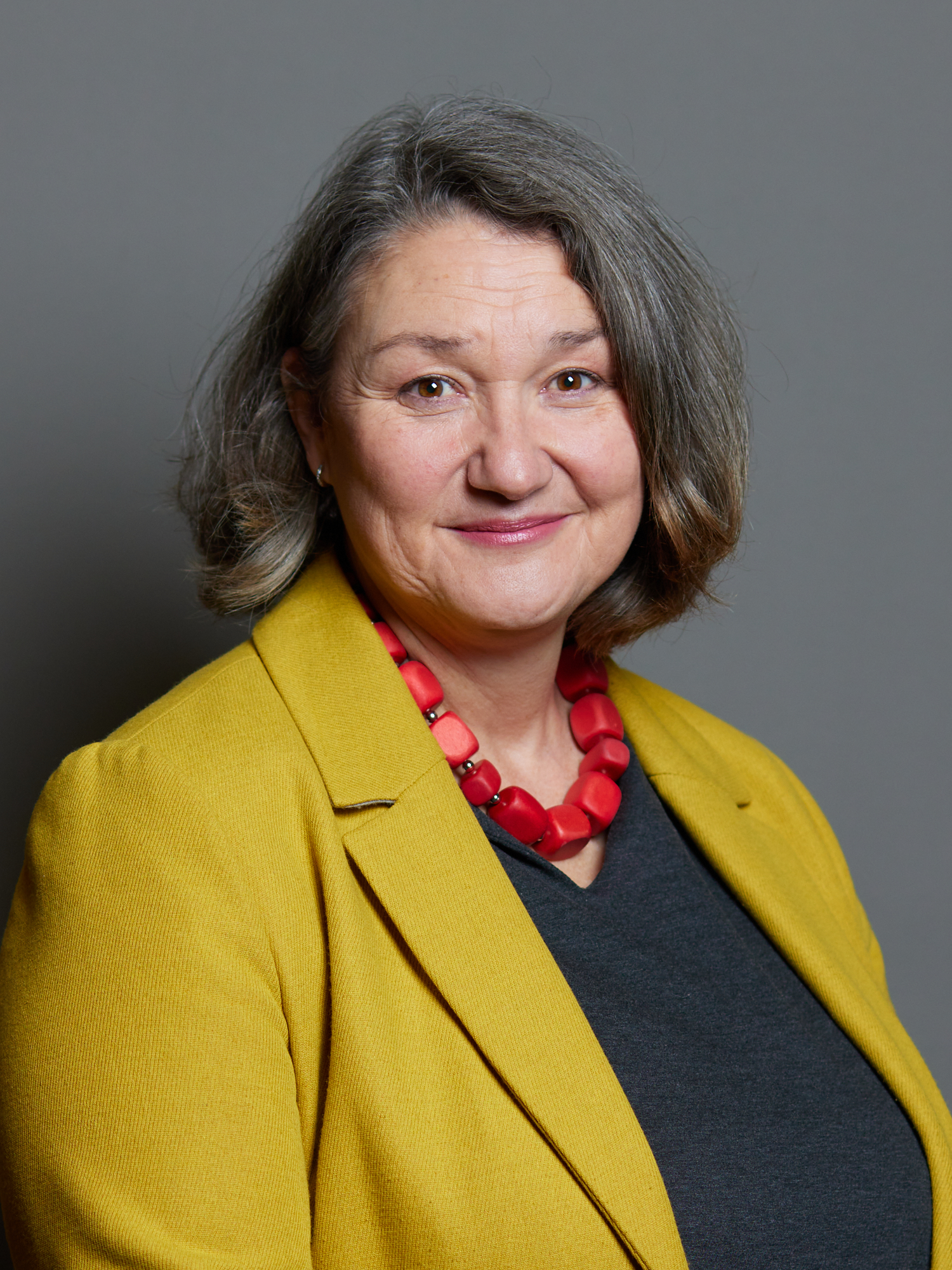
- Official portrait, 2021

Member of Parliament for Hartlepool
- In office 6 May 2021 – 30 May 2024
- Preceded by: Mike Hill
- Succeeded by: Jonathan Brash

Hambleton District Councillor for Raskelf & White Horse
- In office 2 May 2019 – 15 October 2021
- Preceded by: Caroline Patmore
- Succeeded by: Philippa James

Personal details
- Born: Jillian Wendy Sowerby; 20 March 1965 (age 61) Leeds, West Riding of Yorkshire, England
- Party: Conservative
- Spouse(s): Marcus Killick (div.); Nicholas Mortimer
- Children: 3
- Education: Leeds East Academy
- Alma mater: Teesside University

Jillian Wendy Mortimer (née Sowerby; born 20 March 1965) is a British Conservative Party politician who served as Member of Parliament (MP) for Hartlepool from 2021 to 2024.

== Early and personal life ==
Jillian Sowerby was born on 20 March 1965 in Leeds. Her father was a builder and her mother was a greengrocer. She attended Parklands Girls High School and later read law at Teesside University as a mature student at the age of 50, studying alongside two of her three children. One of her grandmothers grew up in Hartlepool. She is married to Nicholas Mortimer.

Before entering the House of Commons, Mortimer was a farmer in Knayton, North Yorkshire, hand-rearing Dexter cows and selling the beef and lamb from the gate of the farm and also training to become a barrister. Today the farm operates as an upmarket B&B with planning permission granted for yurts and shepherd's huts to be added to the site. She announced her intention to buy a property in her Hartlepool constituency following her election, however she did not do so.

== Political career ==
Mortimer served as a councillor for Raskelf and White Horse ward on Hambleton District Council between May 2019 and October 2021.

At the 2019 general election, Mortimer stood as the Conservative candidate in Leeds East, coming second with 35.7% of the vote behind the incumbent Labour MP Richard Burgon.

== Parliamentary career ==
Mortimer was confirmed as the prospective parliamentary candidate for Hartlepool on 26 March 2021. This was in advance of the subsequent 2021 Hartlepool by-election, which was announced following the resignation of Mike Hill, the incumbent Labour MP. She described her priorities for Hartlepool as being: "Recovering from the pandemic, regenerating our high streets and local communities, unlocking the opportunities of Brexit to help create good quality sustainable jobs, helping businesses deliver more apprenticeships and recruiting more police officers."

During the campaign, the deputy leader of the Labour Party, Angela Rayner, accused Mortimer of tax avoidance when previously living with her first husband, Marcus Killick, and their family in the Cayman Islands. The co-chairman of the Conservative Party, Amanda Milling, tweeted that Rayner had made "an eye-popping error" in having "tried to slur" Mortimer because Killick had been working for the Cayman Islands Monetary Authority, the primary financial services regulator for the British Overseas Territory. Milling stated Mortimer and her ex-husband "did not gain any tax advantage from living in the Cayman Islands, nor did she advise any others on this".

At the by-election, Mortimer was elected with 51.9% of the vote and a majority of 6,940. She made her maiden speech in the House of Commons on 21 September 2021.

In June 2022, during the 2022 vote of confidence in the Conservative Party leadership of Boris Johnson, Mortimer expressed her support for the prime minister.

In September 2022, Mortimer resigned as a parliamentary private secretary after two weeks in the role to focus on her constituency. She sent a letter of no confidence in the leadership of Liz Truss on 20 October 2022.

Mortimer lost her seat to Labour politician Jonathan Brash in the 2024 general election.

Parliament of the United Kingdom
| Preceded by Mike Hill | Member of Parliament for Hartlepool; 2021–2024 | Succeeded by Jonathan Brash |
