= Hartlepool (constituency) =

UK Parliament constituency (since 1974)

Coordinates: 54.67°N 1.26°W

- Borough constituency for the House of Commons
- Interactive map of boundaries since 1983
- Location within North East England
- County: County Durham
- Electorate: 71,228 (March 2020)
- Major settlements: Hartlepool, Seaton Carew

Current constituency
- Created: 1974
- Member of Parliament: Jonathan Brash (Labour)
- Seats: One
- Created from: The Hartlepools

Hartlepool /ˈhɑːrtlɪpuːl/ HART-lih-pool is a borough constituency represented in the House of Commons of the UK Parliament (Note: As with all constituencies, Hartlepool elects one Member of Parliament (MP) by the first past the post system of election at least every five years.) by Jonathan Brash of the Labour Party from 2024. The constituency covers the town of Hartlepool plus nearby settlements.

Labour won every contest for the seat since the first at the February 1974 election (and mostly won the predecessor constituency of The Hartlepools from the 1945 election onward) until Jill Mortimer won the 2021 by-election, becoming the first Conservative MP to represent Hartlepool since 1959. However, she lost her seat back to Labour three years later, falling to third place.

== Constituency profile ==
The Hartlepool constituency is located in County Durham and is coterminous with the Borough of Hartlepool. It covers the large town of Hartlepool and the villages to its west, including part of the new garden village of Wynyard. Hartlepool is an industrial port town on England's North Sea coast. The town was heavily involved in the shipping of coal from the nearby mining areas, but went into decline with the closure of industry and coal mining in the late 20th century. Today, the town experiences high levels of deprivation, with most parts falling within the top 10% most-deprived areas in England. The average house price in Hartlepool is less than half the national average.

In general, residents of Hartlepool have low levels of education and income. A high proportion of residents work in the health and manufacturing industries and few work in professional fields. White people made up 96% of the population at the 2021 census. At the local borough council, most of the town is represented by the Labour Party with some Conservatives elected in the rural west. Voters in Hartlepool overwhelmingly supported leaving the European Union in the 2016 referendum; an estimated 70% voted in favour of Brexit, making Hartlepool one of the top 25 most Brexit-supporting constituencies out of 650 nationwide.

== Boundaries ==
=== 1974–1983 ===
The County Borough of Hartlepool.

Before 1974 the seat was known as The Hartlepools (reflecting the representation of both old Hartlepool and West Hartlepool). The name was changed following the merger in 1967 of the County Borough of West Hartlepool and the Municipal Borough of Hartlepool to form the County Borough of Hartlepool.

=== 1983–present ===
The Borough of Hartlepool.

As a result of major local government boundary changes in 1974 arising from the Local Government Act 1972, the Borough of Hartlepool was incorporated into the new county of Cleveland. As a consequence, a small part of the pre-1983 Easington constituency was added to the seat.

The 2023 review of Westminster constituencies left the boundaries unchanged.

The seat is currently coterminous with the borough of Hartlepool, which has close to the average population for a UK parliamentary constituency. The seat includes the town of Hartlepool itself and the nearby villages of Hart, Elwick, Greatham, Newton Bewley and Dalton Piercy.

== History ==
The constituency had previously substantially been in the constituency of The Hartlepools. It became the constituency of Hartlepool in 1974.

Hartlepool was a Labour constituency from its creation until 2021, although its predecessor did have Conservative MPs both in the early 1960s and during the Second World War. At the 1992 general election, Ted Leadbitter stood down and was succeeded by the former Labour Director of Communications Peter Mandelson. Mandelson's pivotal role in the reshaping of the Labour Party into New Labour attracted much attention, and he became a prominent target.

During the first term of the Labour government led by Tony Blair, Mandelson was twice appointed to the Cabinet and twice forced to resign amid minor but controversial scandals. At the 2001 general election there was a notable contest when Arthur Scargill, former leader of the National Union of Mineworkers and the leader of the Socialist Labour Party, stood for election in the hope of exploiting uneasiness about New Labour in "traditional" Labour heartlands. In the event, Mandelson retained his seat, while Scargill polled only 912 votes. Mandelson shocked many with a triumphalist victory speech in which he declared "They underestimated Hartlepool, and they underestimated me, because I am a fighter and not a quitter!".

The following year, the town's first direct Mayoral election generated surprise when the mascot of Hartlepool United F.C., H'Angus the Monkey (real name Stuart Drummond) was elected on a platform that included free bananas for schoolchildren.

Mandelson resigned as MP for Hartlepool when he was appointed as a European commissioner in the summer of 2004. This triggered a by-election that took place on 30 September. The Hartlepool by-election – the last held prior to the 2005 general election – saw Iain Wright retain the seat for Labour with a majority of 2,033 votes. That by-election marked the first time that the UK Independence Party had ever finished in third place at a by-election.

The Labour Party has continued to hold the seat since the by-election, with a dwindling majority and falling share of the vote, and at the three most recent general elections, three parties have finished in second place: the Liberal Democrats in 2005 (following their strong performance at the by-election the previous year), the Conservative Party in 2010, and UKIP, going one better than its by-election showing, in 2015.

In May 2010, the Conservatives gained their largest percentage vote increase in the country in Hartlepool, reducing the Labour majority to just over 5,500, whilst in 2015, UKIP recorded their eleventh-highest vote share in the United Kingdom, taking 28% and reducing the Labour majority to just over 3,000 votes.

== 2010 general election ==
Both the 2010 and 2015 general elections (in addition to several local elections) took place against the backdrop of concerns regarding the potential closure of Hartlepool and Stockton hospitals and their replacement with a new "super hospital" in out of town Wynyard. This precipitated the closure of several departments, and the removal of services from Hartlepool. The move was initially supported by Hartlepool MP Iain Wright, and opposed by Stockton South candidate James Wharton at the 2010 general election. A substantial protest group was formed opposing Wynyard, and calling on services to remain at Hartlepool, backed by a campaign by the Hartlepool Mail, a local newspaper.

Following the 2008 financial crisis and the Great Recession, the Cameron–Clegg coalition announced it would scrap the Wynyard proposals, although no guarantees were made regarding the future of Hartlepool hospital. This issue continued to dominate politics in Hartlepool at both general elections and local council elections, which dented support for Iain Wright and Labour, who had backed the Wynyard plans, whilst many independent candidates gained traction.

At the 2010 general election, the Conservative Party approached Alan Wright, a regional broadcaster for the BBC and columnist for the Hartlepool Mail, to stand as its candidate, despite his lack of political and campaigning experience, hoping that his high-profile would help. It was also noted that the similarity of his name to that of the town's MP, and the fact he would feature above him on the ballot paper, might result in additional votes. The Conservative Party gained a swing of 16.7%, the largest in the country, taking second place from the Liberal Democrats, and garnering it a vote share far exceeding their traditional local support.

== 2015 general election ==
Sitting MP Iain Wright was the only candidate from 2010 to remain on the much-extended ballot paper in 2015, in which the three main parties faced competition from UKIP, the Green Party, and three independent candidates, each standing primarily on healthcare-related platforms.

Popular local taxi driver and charity fundraiser Stephen Picton put himself forward as the voice of the hospital campaigners, although this was challenged by the last-minute candidacy of Sandra Allison, who stood under the banner of 'Your Vote Could Save Our Hospital'. John Hobbs, an 80 year old autism campaigner stood under the tagline 'Tell it like it is'.

UKIP earmarked Hartlepool as a potential gain, and the seat became one of its top ten national targets as well as its main target in the north-east, attracting significant party funding, visits from leader Nigel Farage, and the regional party conference. It selected Philip Broughton, a former Stockton Conservative Councillor and wrestling entrepreneur, as its candidate. The Conservative Party selected public affairs consultant and competitive swimmer, Richard Royal, as its candidate.

The Conservative Party's national '40/40 strategy' meant that much of its regional resources were directed towards the marginal seats of Stockton South and Middlesbrough South and East Cleveland, forcing candidates to campaign outside of their selected seats. The Green Party selected local member Michael Holt, who had been arrested the previous year for obstructing a police officer at a protest in London, although charges were subsequently dropped. Just days before the nomination deadline, the Liberal Democrats selected Darlington-based Hilary Allen as its candidate.

On Valentine's Day in 2015, a 'We Love Our Hospital' rally was organised by Save Our Hospital and the Teesside Peoples' Assembly Against Austerity, attracting large crowds in Hartlepool town centre. Candidates Iain Wright, Richard Royal, Philip Broughton, Stephen Picton and Michael Holt each gave speeches alongside other selected speakers. It was reported that Wright was booed and heckled by the crowd.

One day prior to the general election, local football club Hartlepool United F.C. took the unprecedented step of openly criticising Wright, and seemingly encouraging fans to support either Royal or Broughton, both of whom had met the club's leadership and shown support for its interests. The club had been under pressure, facing relegation and had an ongoing land dispute with the Labour council.

Throughout the campaign, both Phillip Broughton and Richard Royal sought to portray themselves as the only viable alternative to Iain Wright, with Broughton distributing leaflets claiming that the Hartlepool election was a 'two horse race', and Royal referring to the close 2010 result, with his slogan "Wright for your town? Wrong for your future. Turn Hartlepool Royal Blue". As a result, much of the anti Labour vote was split, with UKIP and the Conservatives gaining a combined 48.9% compared to Iain Wright's 35.6%, but neither taking enough votes individually to defeat Labour. At one point during election night itself, the vote looked so close that a recount was reported to be due, but this proved to be unnecessary after the inclusion of postal votes.

== 2017 general election ==
Following the 2015 general election result, Hartlepool became the 35th most vulnerable Labour seat in the country. At the EU referendum in 2016 Hartlepool voted to 'Leave' by 69.5%, making it one of the highest Leave-voting Labour-held seats in the UK. Despite this intense Euroscepticism in the area making it perceived as a vulnerable seat for Labour, at the 2017 general election Labour's new candidate Mike Hill retained the seat, with UKIP's vote falling by 17 points and Labour's rising by 17 points. This gave Labour their biggest total vote and popular vote majority in Hartlepool since 2001.

Following an allegation of sexual assault made against him in September 2019, Hill sat as an independent. However, three weeks later, the allegation was withdrawn, and he had the Labour whip restored.

== 2021 by-election ==
On 16 March 2021 Mike Hill resigned as the MP for Hartlepool, triggering a by-election. The election was won by Jill Mortimer of the Conservative Party. It was the first time the Conservatives had held the seat.

== Members of Parliament ==
Election	Member	Party
Feb 1974	Ted Leadbitter	Labour
1992	Peter Mandelson	Labour
2004 by-election	Iain Wright	Labour
2017	Mike Hill	Labour
2019	Mike Hill	Independent
2019	Mike Hill	Labour
2021 by-election	Jill Mortimer	Conservative
2024	Jonathan Brash	Labour

== Elections ==
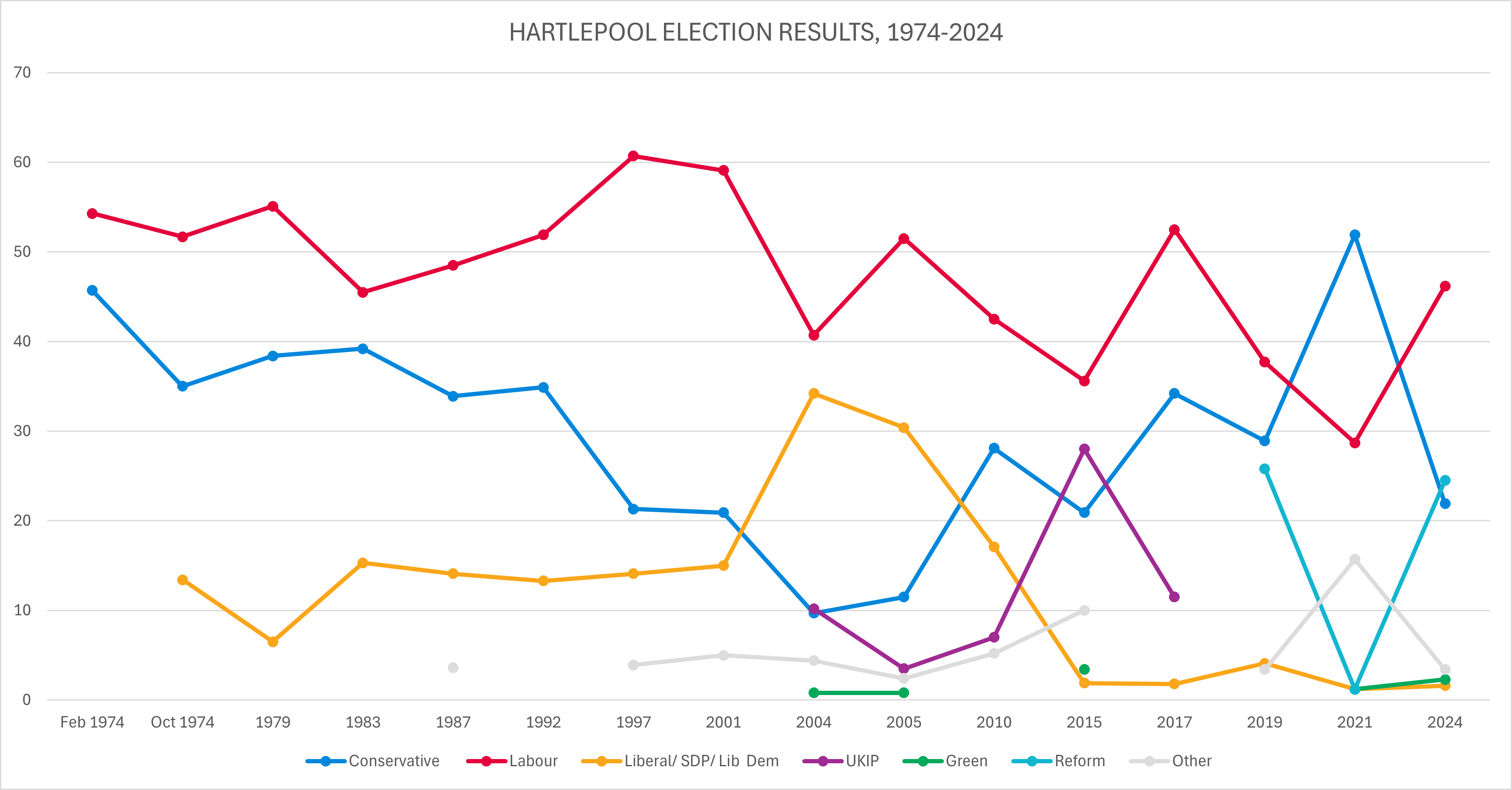
Election results 1974-2024

=== Elections in the 2020s ===
General election 2024: Hartlepool
Party	Candidate	Votes	%	±%
Labour	Jonathan Brash	16,414	46.2	+8.5
Reform	Amanda Napper	8,716	24.5	−1.3
Conservative	Jill Mortimer	7,767	21.9	−7.0
Independent	Sam Lee	895	2.5	N/A
Green	Jeremy Spyby-Steanson	834	2.3	N/A
Liberal Democrats	Peter Maughan	572	1.6	−2.5
Workers Party	Thomas Dudley	248	0.7	N/A
Heritage	Vivienne Neville	65	0.2	N/A
Majority		7,698	21.7	+12.9
Turnout		35,511	49.7	−7.9
Registered electors		71,437		
Labour hold		Swing	+7.7	

Vote share changes for the 2024 election are compared to the notional results from the 2019 election, not the 2021 by-election.

By-election 2021: Hartlepool
Party	Candidate	Votes	%	±%
Conservative	Jill Mortimer	15,529	51.9	+23.0
Labour	Paul Williams	8,589	28.7	–9.0
Independent	Sam Lee	2,904	9.7	N/A
Heritage	Claire Martin	468	1.6	N/A
Reform	John Prescott (Note: Not the former Deputy Prime Minister from 1997 to 2007)	368	1.2	–24.6
Green	Rachel Featherstone	358	1.2	N/A
Liberal Democrats	Andy Hagon	349	1.2	–2.9
Independent	Thelma Walker (Note: Walker was a member of and endorsed by the Northern Independence Party, but appeared on the ballot as an independent due to that party not being registered with the Electoral Commission.)	250	0.8	N/A
No description	Chris Killick	248	0.8	N/A
North East	Hilton Dawson	163	0.5	N/A
Independent	Ralph Ward-Jackson	157	0.5	N/A
Women's Equality	Gemma Evans	140	0.5	N/A
Independent	Adam Gaines	126	0.4	N/A
SDP	David Bettney	108	0.4	N/A
Monster Raving Loony	The Incredible Flying Brick	104	0.3	N/A
Freedom Alliance	Steve Jack	72	0.2	N/A
Majority		6,940	23.2	N/A
Turnout		29,933	42.7	–15.2
Conservative gain from Labour		Swing	+16.0	

The result was the biggest swing towards an incumbent governing party in a by-election in the post war era; the record was formerly the 1945 Bournemouth by-election.

=== Elections in the 2010s ===
General election 2019: Hartlepool
Party	Candidate	Votes	%	±%
Labour	Mike Hill	15,464	37.7	−14.8
Conservative	Stefan Houghton	11,869	28.9	−5.3
Brexit Party	Richard Tice	10,603	25.8	N/A
Liberal Democrats	Andy Hagon	1,696	4.1	+2.3
Independent	Joe Bousfield	911	2.2	N/A
Socialist Labour	Kevin Cranney	494	1.2	N/A
Majority		3,595	8.8	−9.5
Turnout		41,037	57.9	−1.3
Labour hold		Swing	-4.8	

General election 2017: Hartlepool
Party	Candidate	Votes	%	±%
Labour	Mike Hill	21,969	52.5	+16.9
Conservative	Carl Jackson	14,319	34.2	+13.3
UKIP	Phillip Broughton	4,801	11.5	−16.5
Liberal Democrats	Andy Hagon	746	1.8	−0.1
Majority		7,650	18.3	+10.6
Turnout		41,835	59.2	+2.4
Labour hold		Swing	+1.8	

General election 2015: Hartlepool
Party	Candidate	Votes	%	±%
Labour	Iain Wright	14,076	35.6	−6.9
UKIP	Phillip Broughton	11,052	28.0	+21.0
Conservative	Richard Royal	8,256	20.9	−7.2
Independent	Stephen Picton	2,954	7.5	N/A
Green	Michael Holt	1,341	3.4	N/A
Save Hartlepool Hospital	Sandra Allison	849	2.0	N/A
Liberal Democrats	Hilary Allen	761	1.9	−15.2
Independent	John Hobbs	201	0.5	N/A
Majority		3,024	7.7	−6.7
Turnout		39,490	56.8	+1.3
Labour hold		Swing	-14.0	

General election 2010: Hartlepool
Party	Candidate	Votes	%	±%
Labour	Iain Wright	16,267	42.5	−9.0
Conservative	Alan Wright	10,758	28.1	+16.6
Liberal Democrats	Reg Clark	6,533	17.1	−13.3
UKIP	Stephen Allison	2,682	7.0	+3.5
BNP	Ronnie Bage	2,002	5.2	N/A
Majority		5,509	14.4	−6.7
Turnout		38,242	55.5	+4.0
Labour hold		Swing	-12.9	

=== Elections in the 2000s ===
General election 2005: Hartlepool
Party	Candidate	Votes	%	±%
Labour	Iain Wright	18,251	51.5	−7.6
Liberal Democrats	Jody Dunn	10,773	30.4	+15.4
Conservative	Amanda Vigar	4,058	11.5	−9.4
UKIP	George Springer	1,256	3.5	N/A
Socialist Labour	Frank Harrison	373	1.1	−1.3
Green	Iris Ryder	288	0.8	N/A
Independent	John Hobbs	275	0.8	N/A
Monster Raving Loony	Jedediah Caleb Bartimaeus Headbanger	162	0.5	N/A
Majority		7,478	21.1	−17.1
Turnout		35,436	51.5	−4.3
Labour hold		Swing	-11.5	

By-election 2004: Hartlepool
Party	Candidate	Votes	%	±%
Labour	Iain Wright	12,752	40.7	−18.4
Liberal Democrats	Jody Dunn	10,719	34.2	+19.2
UKIP	Stephen Allison	3,193	10.2	N/A
Conservative	Jeremy Middleton	3,044	9.7	−11.2
Respect	John Bloom	572	1.8	N/A
Green	Iris Ryder	255	0.8	N/A
National Front	Jim Starkey	246	0.8	N/A
Fathers 4 Justice	Peter Watson	139	0.4	N/A
Socialist Labour	Christopher Herriot	95	0.3	−2.1
Common Good	Dick Rodgers	91	0.3	N/A
Independent	Philip Berriman	90	0.3	N/A
Monster Raving Loony	Alan Hope	80	0.3	N/A
Independent Rainbow	Ronnie Carroll	45	0.1	N/A
English Democrat	Ed Abrams	41	0.1	N/A
Majority		2,033	6.5	−31.7
Turnout		31,362	45.8	−10.0
Labour hold		Swing	-11.5	

General election 2001: Hartlepool
Party	Candidate	Votes	%	±%
Labour	Peter Mandelson	22,506	59.1	−1.6
Conservative	Augustine Robinson	7,935	20.9	−0.4
Liberal Democrats	Nigel Boddy	5,717	15.0	+0.9
Socialist Labour	Arthur Scargill	912	2.4	N/A
Independent	Ian Cameron	557	1.5	N/A
Independent	John Booth	424	1.1	N/A
Majority		14,571	38.2	−1.2
Turnout		38,051	55.8	−9.8
Labour hold		Swing		

=== Elections in the 1990s ===
General election 1997: Hartlepool
Party	Candidate	Votes	%	±%
Labour	Peter Mandelson	26,997	60.7	+8.8
Conservative	Michael Horsley	9,489	21.3	−13.6
Liberal Democrats	Reginald Clark	6,248	14.1	+0.8
Referendum	Maureen Henderson	1,718	3.9	N/A
Majority		17,508	39.4	+22.4
Turnout		44,452	65.6	−10.5
Labour hold		Swing	+11.2	

General election 1992: Hartlepool
Party	Candidate	Votes	%	±%
Labour	Peter Mandelson	26,816	51.9	+3.4
Conservative	Graham M. Robb	18,034	34.9	+1.0
Liberal Democrats	Ian Cameron	6,860	13.3	−0.8
Majority		8,782	17.0	+2.4
Turnout		51,710	76.1	+3.1
Labour hold		Swing	+1.2	

=== Elections in the 1980s ===
General election 1987: Hartlepool
Party	Candidate	Votes	%	±%
Labour	Ted Leadbitter	24,296	48.5	+3.0
Conservative	Peter Catchpole	17,007	33.9	−5.3
Liberal	Arthur Preece	7,047	14.1	−1.3
Independent	Ian Cameron	1,786	3.6	N/A
Majority		7,289	14.6	+8.3
Turnout		50,136	73.0	+3.2
Labour hold		Swing		

General election 1983: Hartlepool
Party	Candidate	Votes	%	±%
Labour	Ted Leadbitter	22,048	45.5	−9.9
Conservative	Frank Rogers	18,958	39.2	+1.3
SDP	Norman Bertram	7,422	15.3	+8.6
Majority		3,090	6.3	−10.4
Turnout		48,434	69.8	−4.9
Labour hold		Swing		

=== Elections in the 1970s ===
General election 1979: Hartlepool
Party	Candidate	Votes	%	±%
Labour	Ted Leadbitter	27,039	55.1	+3.4
Conservative	K. Miller	18,887	38.4	+3.4
Liberal	Christopher M. Abbott	3,193	6.5	−6.9
Majority		8,162	16.7	±0.0
Turnout		49,109	74.7	+2.3
Labour hold		Swing		

General election October 1974: Hartlepool
Party	Candidate	Votes	%	±%
Labour	Ted Leadbitter	24,440	51.7	−2.6
Conservative	Nicholas Freeman	16,546	35.0	−10.7
Liberal	L Tostevin	6,314	13.4	N/A
Majority		7,894	16.7	+8.1
Turnout		47300	72.4	−4.5
Labour hold		Swing		

General election February 1974: Hartlepool
Party	Candidate	Votes	%	±%
Labour	Ted Leadbitter	26,988	54.3	
Conservative	Nicholas Freeman	22,700	45.7	
Majority		4,288	8.6	
Turnout		49,688	76.9	
Labour win (new seat)				

== See also ==
- parliamentary constituencies in Cleveland
- History of parliamentary constituencies and boundaries in Cleveland
- History of parliamentary constituencies and boundaries in Durham
- List of parliamentary constituencies in North East England (region)
