= 2021 Hartlepool by-election =

UK parliamentary by-election

- 6 May 2021

Hartlepool constituency
- Turnout: 42.7% (▼15.2 pp)
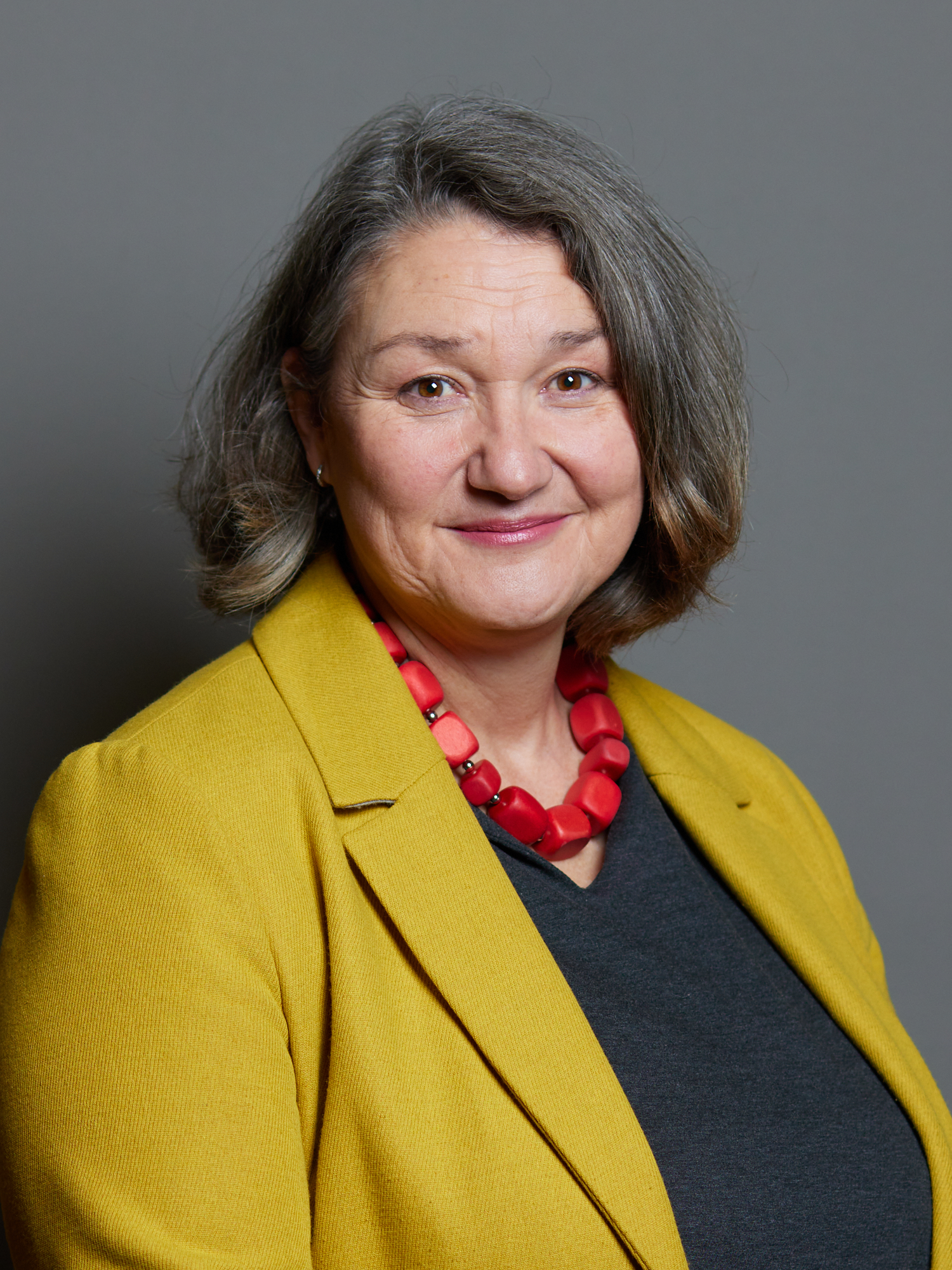

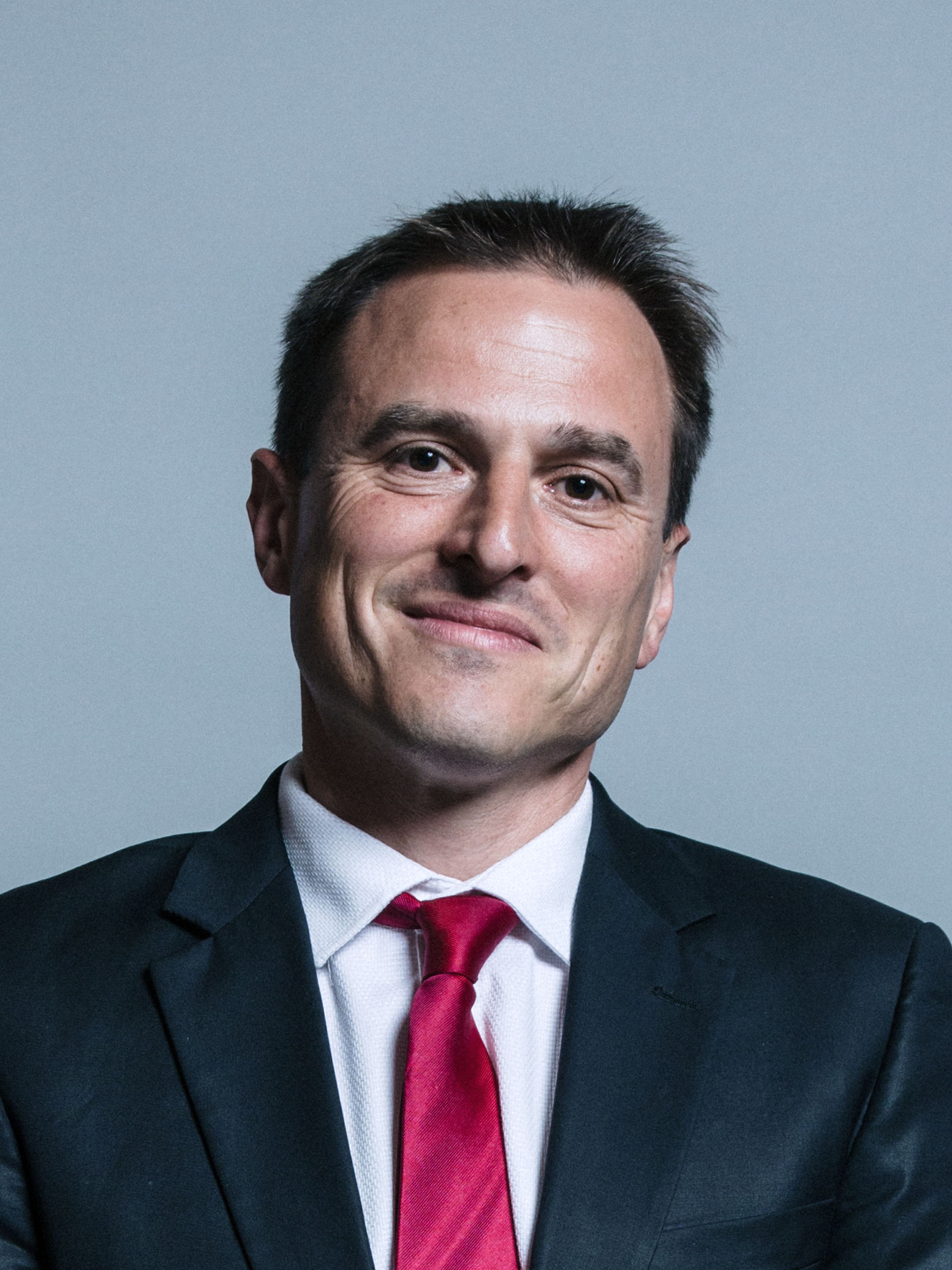
	First party	Second party	Third party
Candidate	Jill Mortimer	Paul Williams	Sam Lee
Party	Conservative	Labour	Independent
Popular vote	15,529	8,589	2,904
Percentage	51.9%	28.7%	9.7%
Swing	▲23.0 pp	▼9.0 pp	New
MP before election
Mike Hill
Labour
Elected MP
Jill Mortimer
Conservative

A by-election for the United Kingdom parliamentary constituency of Hartlepool was held on 6 May 2021, triggered by the resignation of incumbent Labour Party Member of Parliament (MP) Mike Hill, who stood down over allegations of sexual harassment. It was won by Jill Mortimer of the Conservative Party with 51.9% of the vote and a swing of 16%—the largest ever swing towards an incumbent governing party in recorded UK by-electoral history.

This was the first by-election of the 2019–2024 parliament. The 21-month gap between the last by-election in Brecon and Radnorshire in August 2019 and the polling day of the by-election in Hartlepool was the longest since the Second World War; this was partially attributed to the COVID-19 pandemic.

== Background ==
=== Constituency ===
Hartlepool, named after the town of the same name, had been held by the Labour Party since 1964. The seat includes the town of Hartlepool itself and the nearby villages of Hart, Elwick, Greatham, Newton Bewley and Dalton Piercy.

In the 2016 European Union membership referendum, the Hartlepool Council area, which covers the same area as the constituency, voted 69.6% to 30.4% to leave the European Union (EU). The seat is part of the "red wall", a set of constituencies in the northern half of England that historically supported the Labour Party but where the party has been challenged by increasing Conservative support.

=== History ===
Hill was due to face an employment tribunal later in the year following allegations of sexual harassment and victimisation. He was suspended from the Labour Party in September 2019 over allegations of sexual harassment, but reinstated in October 2019. In January 2020, Hill's request for anonymity was turned down in an upcoming employment tribunal related to the accusations. The alleged victim stated that she had also made a report to the Metropolitan Police at the time of the original accusations. On 16 March 2021, Hill announced his resignation with immediate effect, triggering the by-election.

== Candidates and timetable ==
There were sixteen candidates, the most for any UK Commons by-election since Haltemprice & Howden in 2008. The full list was published on 8 April 2021.

NHS doctor and former MP Paul Williams was selected as the Labour candidate on 18 March. Williams represented the nearby constituency of Stockton South but lost his seat at the 2019 election. He had been standing for the position of Cleveland Police and Crime Commissioner, to be elected in May 2021, but withdrew from that contest in order to stand in Hartlepool.

On 17 March, Reform UK leader Richard Tice, who contested the seat in 2019, told LBC that the party intended to stand a candidate. On 31 March, the party selected businessman John Prescott (no relation to the former deputy prime minister of the same name) as their candidate. He was the party's candidate for Stockton South in the 2019 election, under its previous name of the Brexit Party.

The Northern Independence Party (NIP) announced on 17 March that it would contest the by-election. Later that month, it selected as its candidate former Labour MP Thelma Walker, who represented the West Yorkshire constituency of Colne Valley, but lost her seat at the 2019 election. Due to the NIP not being registered with the Electoral Commission by the deadline on 8 April, Walker was listed on the ballot as an Independent.

On 20 March, the Social Democratic Party (SDP) announced its intention to stand in the by-election. On 29 March, the SDP announced that its candidate would be David Bettney, a former regimental sergeant major in the Light Dragoons. On 22 March, Gemma Evans from the Women's Equality Party expressed her intention to stand. On 24 March, the North East Party announced that former Labour MP and founding party member Hilton Dawson would be its candidate for the by-election.

On 26 March, the Conservative Party selected farmer and Hambleton District Cllr Jill Mortimer as its candidate in the by-election. She was previously the Conservative candidate in Leeds East at the 2019 election. Incumbent Conservative Tees Valley Mayor Ben Houchen was reportedly unhappy with the choice of candidate, due to her not being from the area, and declined to endorse Mortimer at the time of her selection.

On 31 March, the Official Monster Raving Loony Party selected party treasurer Nick "The Incredible Flying Brick" Delves as its candidate.

On 2 April, local pub owner Adam Gaines announced his intention to stand as an independent candidate. On the same day, the Liberal Democrats selected schoolteacher Andy Hagon as their candidate. Hagon was the party's candidate for the constituency at both the 2017 and 2019 elections.

On 6 April, former journalist and local businesswoman Samantha Lee announced her intention to stand as an independent candidate lobbying for Hartlepool to be awarded freeport status.

On 7 April, Rachel Featherstone, a lecturer at Teesside University, was selected as the Green Party candidate. Featherstone was previously her party's candidate for Sunderland Central in 2015, 2017, and 2019, and was top of the Green Party list in North East England at the 2019 European election.

On 8 April, London-based businessman Ralph Ward-Jackson, descendant of West Hartlepool founder and 19th-century Conservative MP for The Hartlepools, Ralph Ward Jackson, declared that he had filed to run, citing the town's lack of a hospital and the closure of the magistrates' court. Ward-Jackson had previously been selected by the local Conservative Party to contest the seat at the 2019 general election, but withdrew to support the Brexit Party.

== Campaign ==
Labour was criticised for the conduct of its selection process, which gave candidates one day to submit application papers. An unnamed Labour MP accused Labour's leadership of a "stitch-up", and alleged that the speed of Labour's selection had disadvantaged local party members. Labour leader Keir Starmer said that the local party had written to Labour headquarters to identify Paul Williams as their preferred choice. While Williams was a vocal advocate of a second referendum on EU membership, the constituency of Hartlepool supported Brexit by almost 70%; he was criticised when it was discovered that he had deleted his pro-EU tweets before his candidacy.

During the by-election campaign, Williams apologised for a tweet he posted in 2011: "Do you have a favourite Tory MILF? Mind-blowing dinner table conversation". He was defended by Starmer, while Labour peer and former shadow Attorney General Shami Chakrabarti called for him to be replaced "immediately". Williams' campaign featured a pledge to return hospital services to the town, but was accused of hypocrisy after it emerged that he was a co-author of a clinical commissioning group report which recommended the closure of those services in 2013.

Early in the by-election campaign, Conservative candidate Jill Mortimer was criticised for being based in North Yorkshire. When asked if Hartlepool was somewhere she spent a lot of time, Mortimer replied: "It hasn't been up until now, but it will be". Later in the campaign, Deputy Leader of the Labour Party Angela Rayner accused Mortimer of corruption. In a letter to Chairman of the Conservative Party Amanda Milling, Rayner requested the publication of a "full account" of Mortimer's time living in the Cayman Islands. Milling described Rayner's accusation as a "desperate attack" that was "factually wrong and entirely disingenuous".

The by-election attracted considerable political attention, with Prime Minister Boris Johnson and Chairman of the Conservative Party Amanda Milling campaigning in the town for the Conservatives, while Keir Starmer, members of his Shadow Cabinet, and the wider Labour frontbench campaigned in the town for Labour. Campaigning temporarily was suspended following the death of Prince Philip, Duke of Edinburgh.

On 22 April, it was reported that Independent candidate Chris Killick is a convicted sex offender. He filmed a 62-second clip of a naked woman in her hotel room while she was unconscious in 2015; she said she woke up to Killick not knowing who he was or how she arrived in the hotel, and said that she was drugged and raped. In 2020, Killick was given a 30-month community order and fined £2,000, and ordered to pay £5,000 in compensation to his victim. Killick did not mention his conviction on any election form or to those who signed his nomination papers, describing his candidacy as "an experiment to see how much publicity I can get. Not by speaking about the offence I committed, but by speaking about the stuff I really care about." In response, 1,400 people signed an online petition calling for the government to prohibit sex offenders from standing for public office.

== Opinion polls ==
Part of a MRP projection with other constituencies

Pollster	Client	Date(s) conducted	Sample size	Lab	Con	Reform	Lib Dem	Green	Thelma Walker (Note: At the time, Walker was a member of, and endorsed by, the Northern Independence Party, but appeared on the ballot as an independent due to that party not being registered with the Electoral Commission.)	Sam Lee	NEP	Others	Lead
2021 by-election		6 May 2021	–	28.7%	51.9%	1.2%	1.2%	1.2%	0.8%	9.7%	0.5%	4.7%	23.2%
Survation	Good Morning Britain	23–29 Apr 2021	517	33%	50%	1%	1%	3%	6%	6%	<1%	1%	17%
Survation	Communication Workers Union	29 Mar – 3 Apr 2021	502	42%	49%	1%	1% (Note: Candidate unspecified, question asked about "a Liberal Democrat candidate".)	1% (Note: Candidate unspecified, question asked about "a Green Party candidate".)	2%	–	<1%	4%	7%
Focaldata	The Times	18–21 Mar 2021	5,265 (Note: Across 83 constituencies within the North.)	39%	36%	9%	3%	7%	–	–	–	6%	3%
2019 general election		12 Dec 2019	–	37.7%	28.9%	25.8%	4.1%	–	–	–	–	3.4%	8.8%

== Result ==
Bar chart of the election result.

By-election 2021: Hartlepool
Party	Candidate	Votes	%	±%
Conservative	Jill Mortimer	15,529	51.9	+23.0
Labour	Paul Williams	8,589	28.7	–9.0
Independent	Sam Lee	2,904	9.7	N/A
Heritage	Claire Martin	468	1.6	N/A
Reform	John Prescott (Note: Not the Labour member of the House of Lords)	368	1.2	–24.6
Green	Rachel Featherstone	358	1.2	N/A
Liberal Democrats	Andy Hagon	349	1.2	–2.9
Independent	Thelma Walker	250	0.8	N/A
No description	Chris Killick	248	0.8	N/A
North East	Hilton Dawson	163	0.5	N/A
Independent	W. Ralph Ward-Jackson	157	0.5	N/A
Women's Equality	Gemma Evans	140	0.5	N/A
Independent	Adam Gaines	126	0.4	N/A
Monster Raving Loony	The Incredible Flying Brick	108	0.4	N/A
SDP	David Bettney	104	0.3	N/A
Freedom Alliance	Steve Jack	72	0.2	N/A
Majority		6,940	23.2	N/A
Turnout		29,933	42.7	–15.2
Conservative gain from Labour		Swing	+16.0	

The result was the biggest swing towards an incumbent governing party in a by-election in the post war era; the record was formerly the 1945 Bournemouth by-election.

== Previous result ==
2019 general election: Hartlepool
Party	Candidate	Votes	%	±%
Labour	Mike Hill	15,464	37.7	–14.8
Conservative	Stefan Houghton	11,869	28.9	–5.3
Brexit Party	Richard Tice	10,603	25.8	N/A
Liberal Democrats	Andy Hagon	1,696	4.1	+2.3
Independent	Joe Bousfield	911	2.2	N/A
Socialist Labour	Kevin Cranney	494	1.2	N/A
Majority		3,595	8.8	–9.5
Turnout		41,037	57.9	–1.3
Labour hold		Swing	–4.8	

== Aftermath ==
The election result was widely seen as a blow to Keir Starmer, the incumbent leader of the Labour Party. While Peter Mandelson put the blame on former leader Jeremy Corbyn, and argued the party had not changed enough, some figures on the Labour left regarded the defeat as a repudiation of Starmer's centrist vision for Labour. Attention was especially focused on the idea that voters did not know what Starmer stood for, a conclusion Williams and Labour deputy leader Angela Rayner both agreed with.

On 23 August, Business Insider reported that Boris Johnson likely breached the Ministerial Code by using taxpayer funds to take a private jet to campaign in Hartlepool.

A biography about Starmer, published in February 2024, reported that he considered resigning in the aftermath of the defeat in Hartlepool. The book reported that Starmer wanted to quit as leader of the party before being persuaded to stay by close aides. One of his former aides, Chris Ward, said that "Keir kept saying that he felt he would have to go, that the result showed the party was going backwards and he saw it as a personal rejection. I told him it was far too soon for that kind of thing, but it was a rocky few hours."

== See also ==
- 2004 Hartlepool by-election, an earlier by-election in this constituency
- 2021 Hartlepool Borough Council election, simultaneous local council elections
- 2021 Airdrie and Shotts by-election, a UK Parliament by-election that took place a week later
- 2021 Chesham and Amersham by-election, a UK Parliament by-election that was triggered around the same time
- 2021 Batley and Spen by-election, a by-election triggered at around the same time by the resignation of another red wall Labour MP
- United Kingdom by-election records; this election is notable in that the government party gained a seat they had not previously held.
