= The Common Good (political party) =

- Welsh name: Lles Pawb
- Leader: Dick Rodgers
- Founded: 1 April 2004
- Ideology: Christian democracy Social conservatism Anti-Islamism

Website
- www.thecommongood.info

For me, participating in the political process isn't about winning, it's about the excitement of having taken part and about getting my ideas across to the public

— Dick Rodgers, 2005

The Common Good is a small Christian political party in the United Kingdom. Founded and led by Richard (Dick) Rodgers, a clergyman and orthopaedic registrar living in Northfield, Birmingham, the party's principles are based on his Christian faith.

Rodgers has competed in several elections for Common Good, including various parliamentary by-elections. In all cases Common Good have lost their deposit. No one else has been an election candidate for the party.

In 2016, the party campaigned for the United Kingdom to remain in the European Union during the Brexit referendum.

== Electoral history ==
Parliamentary election

Election	Constituency	Candidate	Votes	%
2004 Hartlepool by-election	Hartlepool	Richard Rodgers	91	0.3
2005 general election	Birmingham Northfield	Richard Rodgers	428	1.4
2006 Dunfermline and West Fife by-election	Dunfermline and West Fife	Richard Rodgers	103	0.3
2008 Henley by-election	Henley	Richard Rodgers	121	0.3
2010 general election	Birmingham Northfield	Richard Rodgers	305	0.7
2014 Newark by-election	Newark	Richard Rodgers	64	0.2
2017 general election	Birmingham Edgbaston	Richard Rodgers	155	0.4
2019 Peterborough by-election	Peterborough	Richard Rodgers	60	0.2
2024 general election	Birmingham Northfield	Richard Rodgers	215	0.6

Rodgers has appeared on ballot papers variously as "Richard Rodgers", "Rev Dick Rodgers" and "Dick Rodgers".

European Parliament elections

Election	Constituency	Votes	%
2004 European election	West Midlands	8,650	0.6

Local elections

Election	Ward	Votes	%
2007 Birmingham City Council election	Weoley	198	3.3
