= Transcripts of legislative bodies =

Legislatures may choose to issue transcripts of the words spoken in their debates and proceedings. Unlike the journals of such bodies, which are merely the record of the votes and measures taken at a given meeting, or government gazettes, which are the records of the laws enacted by such legislatures, these transcripts are nominally a verbatim record of the words spoken on the floor. Such records can, and often have, been instead printed in private newspapers independent from the legislature itself.

It is much more effort to record the exact words spoken at a legislative meeting than to simply record the motions and votes, so transcripts as such are much less common than journals. In the British parliament, whose records date to the 14th century, transcribing the words spoken during parliamentary business became legal only in the early 19th century. At that time the Hansard began print, and even then was an incomplete record of the proceedings until the 20th century. Similarly, whilst the Canadian federal parliament has had a Hansard since its 1867 inception, its provinces largely did not adopt them until the late 20th century.

In the United States, the houses of Congress have maintained journals since their 1789 creation, a transcript of its debates did not begin until the 1824 Register of the Debates of Congress, whose successors began offering verbatim transcription in 1851 and evolved into the Congressional Record.

== Commonwealth ==
The proceedings of the British Parliament, and by extension those of colonies in the former British Empire and its successor the Commonwealth of Nations, is usually called Hansard after the early 19th century printer Thomas Curson Hansard.

Nova Scotia produced a Hansard from as early as 1855, but there was a gap between 1917 and 1951. New Brunswick started a Hansard in 1900. The Dominion of Newfoundland began printing a Hansard in 1909, which continued until the Commission of Government assumed control in 1933. After Newfoundland regained responsible government upon joining Canada in 1949, the production of Hansards restarted and continued to this day.

Manitoba began printing a Hansard in 1958, as did Quebec in 1964. Saskatchewan began recording a Hansard in 1947 with Dictaphone machinery. British Columbia likewise began tape-recording its debates in January 1970. Alberta was one of the two last Canadian provinces to begin printing a formal Hansard, doing so in 1972; prior to that time important speeches made in the Legislative Assembly were recorded in local newspapers and collected in a "Scrapbook Hansard", despite proposals for a recorded Hansard as early as 1919. Prince Edward Island achieved a Hansard as late as 1996, the last province in Canada to do so.

== United States ==
=== Congressional Record ===
Incomplete transcripts of debates in Congress prior to 1824 were assembled into the Annals of Congress between 1834 and 1856 from newspaper accounts, with speeches being paraphrased rather than verbatim. Contemporary transcription came with the 1824 Register of Debates, but was still incomplete and paraphrasing until the succeeding Congressional Globe began approximating verbatim transcription in 1851; the Globe turned into the modern-day Congressional Record.

=== State legislatures ===
State legislatures likewise have had a rough history with transcription.

== Other countries ==
The Ukrainian parliament prints the Holos Ukrayiny as its official newspaper.
