= Steve Benen =

American political writer and producer

- Born: May 15, 1973 (age 52); Miami, Florida, United States
- Education: Florida International University (BA); George Washington University
- Occupations: Political writer and blogger, producer of The Rachel Maddow Show
- Awards: Two Emmy Awards

Steve Benen (born May 15, 1973) is an American progressive political writer, blogger, MSNBC contributor, and the producer of The Rachel Maddow Show, for which he received two Emmy Awards in 2017. Benen's first book, The Impostors: How Republicans Quit Governing and Seized American Politics, was published in 2020. His latest book is Ministry of Truth: Democracy, Reality, and the Republicans' War on the Recent Past, which was published in August 2024.

== Early life and education ==
Benen was born and raised in Miami, Florida. He earned a B.A. in Political Science from Florida International University, where he served in the student government alongside future Maryland state legislator Kirill Reznik. He then earned a master's degree in Political Management from George Washington University, and served as a White House intern for President Bill Clinton.

== Career ==
=== Politics ===
In 1996, he was the communications director for an unsuccessful Democratic congressional campaign in Pennsylvania. From 1997 to 2002, Benen worked as a staff writer at Church & State magazine, published by Americans United for the Separation of Church and State.

=== Media ===
From August 2008 to January 2012, Benen was the lead blogger for the Washington Monthly's "Political Animal" blog, taking over from founder Kevin Drum. He was the publisher of the political blog The Carpetbagger Report for five years and was the lead editor of Salon.com's Blog Report.

In July 2009, The Atlantic named Benen one of the top 50 most influential political commentators in the United States. In 2012, Benen wrote the introduction to the e-book, Elephant in the Room: Washington in the Bush Years.

Digital Pamphleteer, a short film about Benen's work as a blogger, was created by Bill Simmon and won an award at the Vermont International Film Festival in 2008.

Benen's articles and op-eds have appeared in a variety of publications, including The New York Times, the Washington Monthly, The American Prospect, The Huffington Post, and the New York Daily News. He has been a contributor to Talking Points Memo, Crooks and Liars, The Guardian, AlterNet, Political Wire, and Seven Days.

He has been a guest on several radio and television programs, including NPR's Talk of the Nation, MSNBC's The Rachel Maddow Show, MSNBC's The Ed Show, MSNBC's Martin Bashir, MSNBC's Live with Thomas Roberts, Current TV's Countdown with Keith Olbermann, Air America Radio's The Sam Seder Show, and XM Satellite Radio's POTUS '08.

As a producer of The Rachel Maddow Show, Benen received Emmy nominations in 2013, 2017, 2018, 2019, and 2020. 2021, winning two Emmys in 2017 for production of the episodes, "An American Disaster: The Crisis in Flint", and "One-on-One with Kellyanne Conway".

Following the June 2020 publication of his book, The Impostors: How Republicans Quit Governing and Seized American Politics, the book reached the top 100 on the USA Today best selling books list.

In August 2024, Benen published Ministry of Truth: Democracy, Reality, and the Republicans' War on the Recent Past, a book that examines the Republican Party's strategies for shaping public perception and historical narratives in the Trump era, receiving praise from Kirkus Reviews, for its incisive analysis of contemporary political tactics. Ministry of Truth debuted at number nine on The New York Times Best Seller list for nonfiction.
