= Journals of legislative bodies =

Government publication

Publications of minutes and proceedings, often known as journals, of legislatures are often kept for record-keeping. Unlike government gazettes which publish government notices and the like for general public dissemination, journals of these bodies merely records their proceedings and are not necessarily meant for the general public. Transcripts are more detailed, including a verbatim account of the debates on the floor.

== Countries ==
=== United Kingdom ===
The journals of the British Houses of Parliament, alongside the Hansard, contain an official record of the Houses of Parliament. The journals are a lengthened account written from the "Votes and Proceedings" (in the House of Lords called "Minutes of Proceedings"), made day by day by the Clerks at the Table, and printed on the responsibility of the Clerk of the House. In the Commons the Votes and Proceedings, but not the Journal, bear the Speaker's signature in fulfilment of a former order that he should "peruse" them before publication. The journals of the British House of Commons begin in the first year of the reign of Edward VI in 1547, and are complete, except for a short interval under Elizabeth I. Those of the House of Lords date from the first year of Henry VIII in 1509. Before that date the proceedings in parliament were entered in the Rolls of Parliament, which extend from 1278 to 1503. The journals of the Lords are "records" in the judicial sense; those of the Commons are not. The Hansard, which is available from 1803, contains printed transcripts of parliamentary debates.

=== United States ===
The Congressional Record is the official record of the proceedings and debates of the United States Congress. It is published by the United States Government Publishing Office, and is issued when the United States Congress is in session. Indexes are issued approximately every two weeks. At the end of a session of Congress, the daily editions are compiled in bound volumes constituting the permanent edition.

The City Record is the official journal of New York City. It is published each weekday (except legal holidays) and contains legal notices produced by city agencies, including notices of proposed and adopted rules, procurement solicitations and awards, upcoming public hearings and meetings, public auctions and property dispositions, and selected court decisions.
