= Blair & Co. =

Blair & Co can refer to:

- Blair & Co, Ltd, a marine engine builder in England, founded by George Young Blair
- Blair & Co, a US bank founded by John Insley Blair, DeWitt Clinton Blair and C. Ledyard Blair
