= 2012 Middlesbrough by-election =

2012 UK Parliamentary by-election

- 29 November 2012

The Middlesbrough seat in the House of Commons
- Turnout: 25.9%
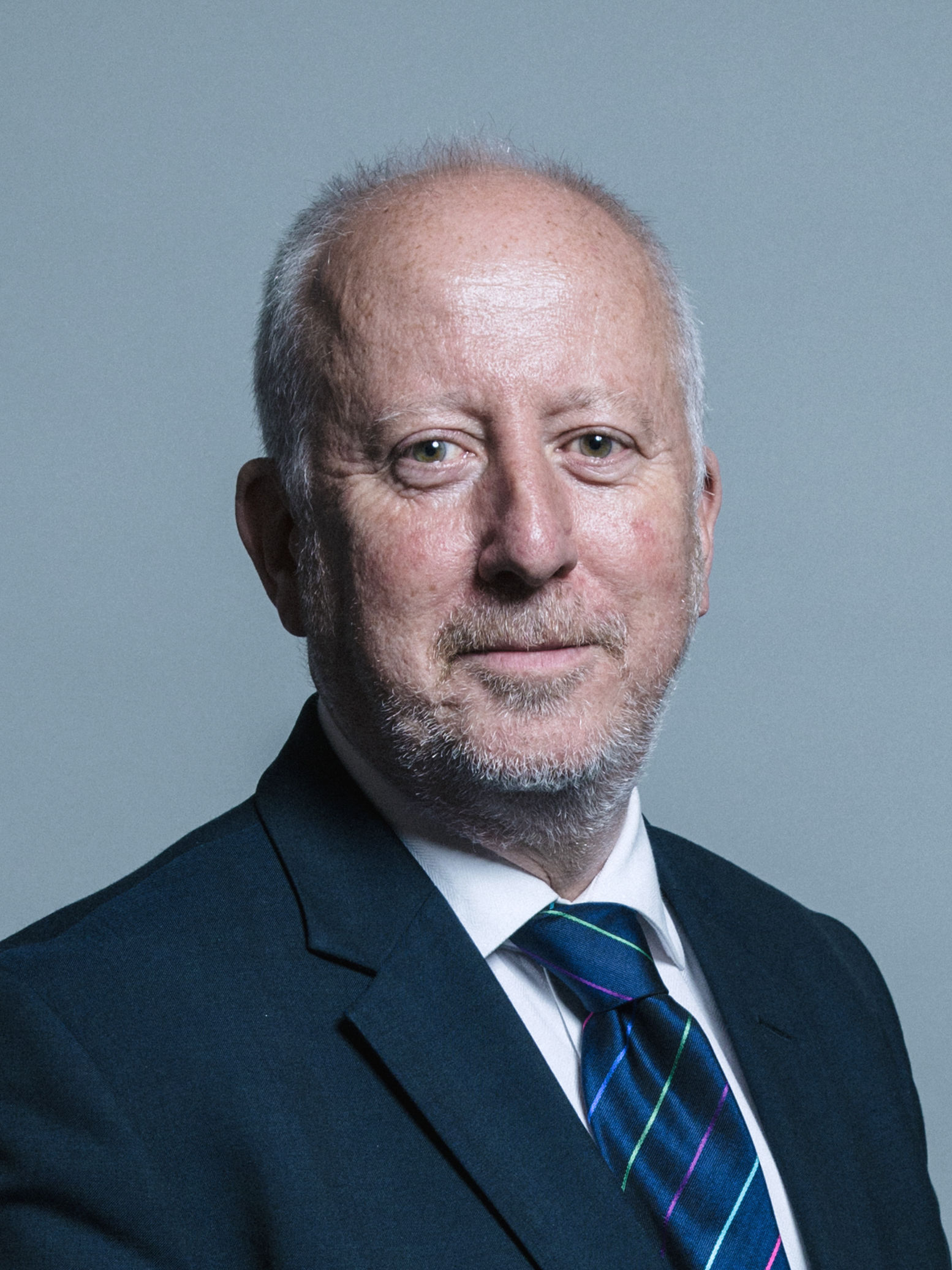

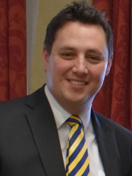
	First party	Second party	Third party
		UKI	Lib
Candidate	Andy McDonald	Richard Elvin	George Selmer
Party	Labour	UKIP	Liberal Democrats
Popular vote	10,201	1,990	1,672
Percentage	60.5%	11.8%	9.9%
Swing	▲14.6 pp	▲8.1 pp	▼10.0 pp
	Fourth party	Fifth party
		Pea
Candidate	Ben Houchen	Imdad Hussain
Party	Conservative	Peace
Popular vote	1,063	1,060
Percentage	6.3%	6.3%
Swing	▼12.5 pp	New party
MP before election
Stuart Bell
Labour
Subsequent MP
Andy McDonald
Labour

A by-election for the United Kingdom parliamentary constituency of Middlesbrough was held on 29 November 2012. It was caused by the death of incumbent Labour Party member of Parliament (MP) Sir Stuart Bell. Andy McDonald of Labour won the by-election, retaining the seat for the party.

It was held on the same day as by-elections in Croydon North and Rotherham. The deadline for nominations was 14 November. UKIP came second and the Liberal Democrats third.

== Candidates ==
Labour selected Andy McDonald, a solicitor born in Middlesbrough and former councillor for Westbourne ward from 1995 to 1999, for the seat. At the time, McDonald was chairman of Middlesbrough Labour Party Local Government Committee.

UKIP selected Richard Elvin, chairman of the North East Regional Committee, as their candidate. He contested the Houghton and Sunderland South seat for UKIP in 2010.

The Liberal Democrats selected George Selmer, who works in employment services, as their candidate.

Stockton borough Councillor Ben Houchen was the Conservative candidate. He would later go on to become Tees Valley Mayor.

In November 2012, Councillor Imdad Hussain, who had been suspended from the Labour Party for two years after failing to disclose he had been banned as a company director, resigned from the party and announced he would be standing for the Peace Party in the by-election.

Campaigner Mark Heslehurst launched his candidacy as a self-styled 'independent Labour' candidate. He had no description on the ballot paper. He had previously organised events to raise awareness of an issue related to his estranged partner and son, which involved walking 500 miles to Downing Street.

The BNP candidate was Peter Foreman.

Trade Unionist and Socialist Coalition candidate John Malcolm was the Tees, Esk & Wear Valley Health Unison branch representative.

Current independent Middlesbrough mayor Ray Mallon mooted the possibility of standing in the by-election, depending on the quality of other candidates, but did not submit his candidacy.

== Hustings ==
Hustings were held at St Barnabas' Church on 26 November 2012, hosted by Friends of the Earth. The lively proceedings went well, with members of the audience asking over 20 questions on topics ranging from education and services to employment and the environment. Six of the eight candidates were invited.

== Result ==
The Labour Party held the seat, with McDonald elected as the new MP. Along with other by-elections held on the same day, there were sharp declines in the vote for the governing coalition parties, although this was the only one of the three at which they both retained their deposit, and the only one at which the Liberal Democrats finished ahead of the Conservatives. UKIP finished in second place. Previously they had only come second in one other parliamentary election (the Barnsley Central by-election in 2011). They also came second in the Rotherham contest held on the same date as the Middlesbrough election.

The result was also notable as the first time the Peace Party had ever retained their deposit at a parliamentary election and their highest percentage of vote share in a single constituency.

Election	Political result	Candidate	Party	Votes	%	±%
Middlesbrough by-election, 2012; Death of Sir Stuart Bell; Turnout: 16,866 (25.91%) −25.5	Labour hold Majority: 8,211 (47.7%) +21.7; Swing: 3.3% from UKIP to Lab	Andy McDonald	Labour	10,201	60.5	+14.6
Middlesbrough by-election, 2012; Death of Sir Stuart Bell; Turnout: 16,866 (25.91%) −25.5	Labour hold Majority: 8,211 (47.7%) +21.7; Swing: 3.3% from UKIP to Lab	Richard Elvin	UKIP	1,990	11.8	+8.1
Middlesbrough by-election, 2012; Death of Sir Stuart Bell; Turnout: 16,866 (25.91%) −25.5	Labour hold Majority: 8,211 (47.7%) +21.7; Swing: 3.3% from UKIP to Lab	George Selmer	Liberal Democrats	1,672	9.9	−10.0
Middlesbrough by-election, 2012; Death of Sir Stuart Bell; Turnout: 16,866 (25.91%) −25.5	Labour hold Majority: 8,211 (47.7%) +21.7; Swing: 3.3% from UKIP to Lab	Ben Houchen	Conservative	1,063	6.3	−12.5
Middlesbrough by-election, 2012; Death of Sir Stuart Bell; Turnout: 16,866 (25.91%) −25.5	Labour hold Majority: 8,211 (47.7%) +21.7; Swing: 3.3% from UKIP to Lab	Imdad Hussain	Peace	1,060	6.3	New
Middlesbrough by-election, 2012; Death of Sir Stuart Bell; Turnout: 16,866 (25.91%) −25.5	Labour hold Majority: 8,211 (47.7%) +21.7; Swing: 3.3% from UKIP to Lab	Peter Foreman	BNP	328	1.9	−3.9
Middlesbrough by-election, 2012; Death of Sir Stuart Bell; Turnout: 16,866 (25.91%) −25.5	Labour hold Majority: 8,211 (47.7%) +21.7; Swing: 3.3% from UKIP to Lab	John Malcolm	TUSC	277	1.6	New
Middlesbrough by-election, 2012; Death of Sir Stuart Bell; Turnout: 16,866 (25.91%) −25.5	Labour hold Majority: 8,211 (47.7%) +21.7; Swing: 3.3% from UKIP to Lab	Mark Heslehurst	no description	275	1.6	New
General Election 2010; Turnout: 33,455 (51.4%) +2.7	Labour hold Majority: 8,689 (26.0%); Swing: 6.4% from Lab to Lib Dem	Stuart Bell	Labour	15,351	45.9	−11.7
General Election 2010; Turnout: 33,455 (51.4%) +2.7	Labour hold Majority: 8,689 (26.0%); Swing: 6.4% from Lab to Lib Dem	Chris Foote-Wood	Liberal Democrats	6,662	19.9	+1.2
General Election 2010; Turnout: 33,455 (51.4%) +2.7	Labour hold Majority: 8,689 (26.0%); Swing: 6.4% from Lab to Lib Dem	John Walsh	Conservative	6,283	18.8	+2.3
General Election 2010; Turnout: 33,455 (51.4%) +2.7	Labour hold Majority: 8,689 (26.0%); Swing: 6.4% from Lab to Lib Dem	Joan McTigue	Independent	1,969	5.9	+5.9
General Election 2010; Turnout: 33,455 (51.4%) +2.7	Labour hold Majority: 8,689 (26.0%); Swing: 6.4% from Lab to Lib Dem	Michael Ferguson	BNP	1,954	5.8	+3.3
General Election 2010; Turnout: 33,455 (51.4%) +2.7	Labour hold Majority: 8,689 (26.0%); Swing: 6.4% from Lab to Lib Dem	Robert Parker	UKIP	1,236	3.7	+1.3

== See also ==
- 1878 Middlesbrough by-election
- List of United Kingdom by-elections
- Opinion polling for the 2015 United Kingdom general election
