= Saint + Sofia =

British womenswear company

- Company type: Private company
- Industry: Fashion Retail
- Founded: January 2020; 6 years ago
- Founders: Malcolm and Dessi Bell
- Headquarters: London, United Kingdom
- Area served: Europe and North America
- Products: Women's clothing
- Number of employees: 70 (2025)
- Website: saintandsofia.com

Saint + Sofia (also known as Saint and Sofia) is a British womenswear company. It is based in London and produces its collections using manufacturing partners in Europe. The brand has been a recipient of Investors in People Gold Award.

Saint + Sofia designs have been featured in Vanity Fair, Vogue, Stylist, Harper's Bazaar, Elle, and The Times, and their designs have been worn by Victoria Starmer.

== History ==
Saint + Sofia was founded in January 2020 by Malcolm and Dessi Bell. Both founders had previously co-founded the activewear company Zaggora before establishing Saint + Sofia as a direct-to-consumer womenswear label.

The company began operations shortly before the COVID-19 pandemic affected the UK retail sector. During 2020, it adjusted its product range in response to reduced demand for formal clothing and increased demand for casual and homewear.

In August 2020, The Financial Times reported on the launch of Saint + Sofia during the early stages of the COVID-19 pandemic, noting changes to its supply chain and product range in response to shifts in consumer demand toward casual and home-based clothing.

From 2021 onward, Saint + Sofia expanded its online retail operations internationally, particularly in the United States. By 2025, the company reported a customer base of approximately 500,000, a workforce of about 70 employees, and annual revenues of around £30 million.

In February 2025, FashionNetwork.com reported that Saint + Sofia planned further expansion of its physical retail presence in the United Kingdom following the opening of its first permanent store in the Seven Dials area of Covent Garden, London, in late 2024.

In July 2025, Victoria Starmer, the wife of UK prime minister Keir Starmer, wore an outfit by Saint + Sofia during a public engagement in Scotland.

The brand has reported serving over 500,000 customers and has fulfilment centres in the UK, US, and Europe.

The Evening Standard has described Saint + Sofia as a multi-million-pound fashion business, reporting that the company reached an annual turnover of approximately £30 million within its first five years of operation.
