= John Sadler (industrialist) =

British industrialist and public figure

John Sadler (1 February 1820 – 22 December 1910) was an English industrialist and public figure associated with the town of Oldbury, Worcestershire (now Oldbury, West Midlands), United Kingdom. As a result of his lifetime of service, Sadler became known as 'the Grand Old Man of Oldbury'.

== Background ==
John was the youngest son of Benjamin Sadler (1777–1850) and Nancy Johnson (1776–1852) of Round's Green, Oldbury. Members of the Sadler family contributed greatly to their native district during the nineteenth century and rose to pre-eminence in the area. Further afield, John's nephew, Sir Samuel Alexander Sadler (1842–1911), achieved renown in the town of Middlesbrough in the North East of England.

== Career ==
Sadler was educated at Himley and West Bromwich, before entering into an apprenticeship under his elder brother Samuel Sadler (1807–1861) as a builder. Having reached the age of 21, he took over the Brick Manufacturing business established by his father, a pioneer of the industry in Oldbury, and came to found his own firm - eventually registered as John Sadler & Sons of Shidas Lane, Oldbury ("manufacturer of every description of Staffordshire brindled, red, blue and brown bricks and tiles"), established in 1847/1849 and converted into a Private Limited Company in 1900. The site owned by Sadler and used for his enterprise was that portion of land bounded by Shidas Lane, Portway Road and Rounds Green Road, amounting to roughly seven acres, immediately outside Oldbury. It is currently under re-development. The marl hole on the site used for the extraction of clay eventually grew to such a size as to swallow Sadler's former place of residence.

== Public service ==
In addition to his labours as an industrialist, Sadler consistently showed the greatest interest in the affairs of his home town. He served on the Urban District Council, the Board of Health, the Burial Board and the West Bromwich Board of Guardians, as a representative of Oldbury, from 1889 until his death.

Sadler was a strong supporter of the Liberal Party and held Prime Minister William Ewart Gladstone in the highest regard. As such, Sadler's final residence on Portway Road, Oldbury was named 'Gladstone House'.

Sadler was a non-conformist associated with the Methodist and Tabernacle churches. He contributed to the cost of erecting the new Methodist Chapel at Round's Green and a stained glass window dedicated to his posterity was installed there following his death.

== Marriages and issue ==
John Sadler married firstly Harriot Sturges (June 1820 – 27 June 1887), daughter of Theophilus Sturges and Ann Page of Brades, Rowley Regis on 23 April 1839 in The Parish Church of Saint Peter and Saint Paul, Aston, by whom he had issue. He married secondly Phoebe Bridge, widow of Joseph Bridge, previously widow of Thomas Sadler Sturges, initially daughter of Joseph Grayer on 24 February 1891.

== Burial ==
Sadler was buried in the family vault at the Parish Church of Christ Church, Oldbury. There sat an elaborate memorial to various members of the family in the churchyard, now dismantled but remaining in situ.

== Principal source ==
- 'Death of Mr. John Sadler', West Bromwich Free Press, 23 December 1910. A lengthy obituary of over 1,200 words, corroborated by other primary sources.
