= Malcolm Bell (entrepreneur) =

British businessman

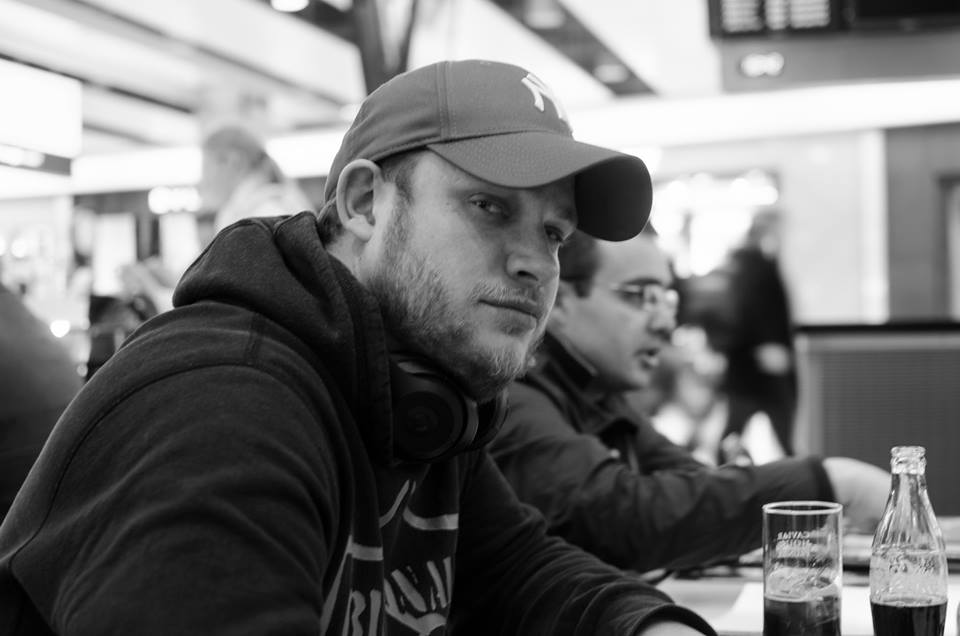
- Born: Malcolm Stuart Bell; December 1981 (age 44)
- Occupation: Businessman
- Known for: co-founder, Zaggora
- Spouse: Dessi Bell
- Parent: Sir Stuart Bell

Malcolm Stuart Bell (born December 1981) is a British entrepreneur and business executive best known as the founder and Chief Executive Officer of Saint + Sofia, a London-based fashion brand recognized for its sustainable design and fair production practices. Saint + Sofia revenues are £30 million a year as of March 2025.

Prior to founding Saint + Sofia, Bell was known for launching Zaggora in 2011, a fitness and fashion startup that gained global media attention for its “HotPants” product which sold over 1,5 million units in over 100 countries and was valued at over £100 million.

He appears in a case study taught at Harvard Business School called 18 Months In A Startup.

He has received awards including the Orange National Business Awards in 2012. He has been a speaker at various events including TED (conference), Barclays, Facebook, Saïd Business School and Retail Week. He also mentors aspiring entrepreneurs through the New Entrepreneurs Foundation and Seedcamp.

== Biography ==
Bell was born in December 1981, to British politician Sir Stuart Bell.

=== Controversies ===
In 2002, Malcolm Bell was jailed for stealing £8,000 from his father's colleagues. Malcolm Bell, the son of Stuart Bell, the MP for Middlesbrough, took blank cheques from the office of George Galloway while working for his father as a researcher in the House of Commons.

== Career ==
Bell began his career in business and technology before turning his focus to fashion and e-commerce. In January 2020, he co-founded Saint and Sofia with his wife, Dessi Bell, combining their expertise in fashion, logistics, and digital marketing.

Prior to founding Saint and Sofia, Bell was known for launching Zaggora, a fitness and fashion startup that gained global media attention for its “HotPants” product and was sold in over 100 countries.
