= Andy McDonald (politician) =

British politician (born 1958)

Andy McDonald MP
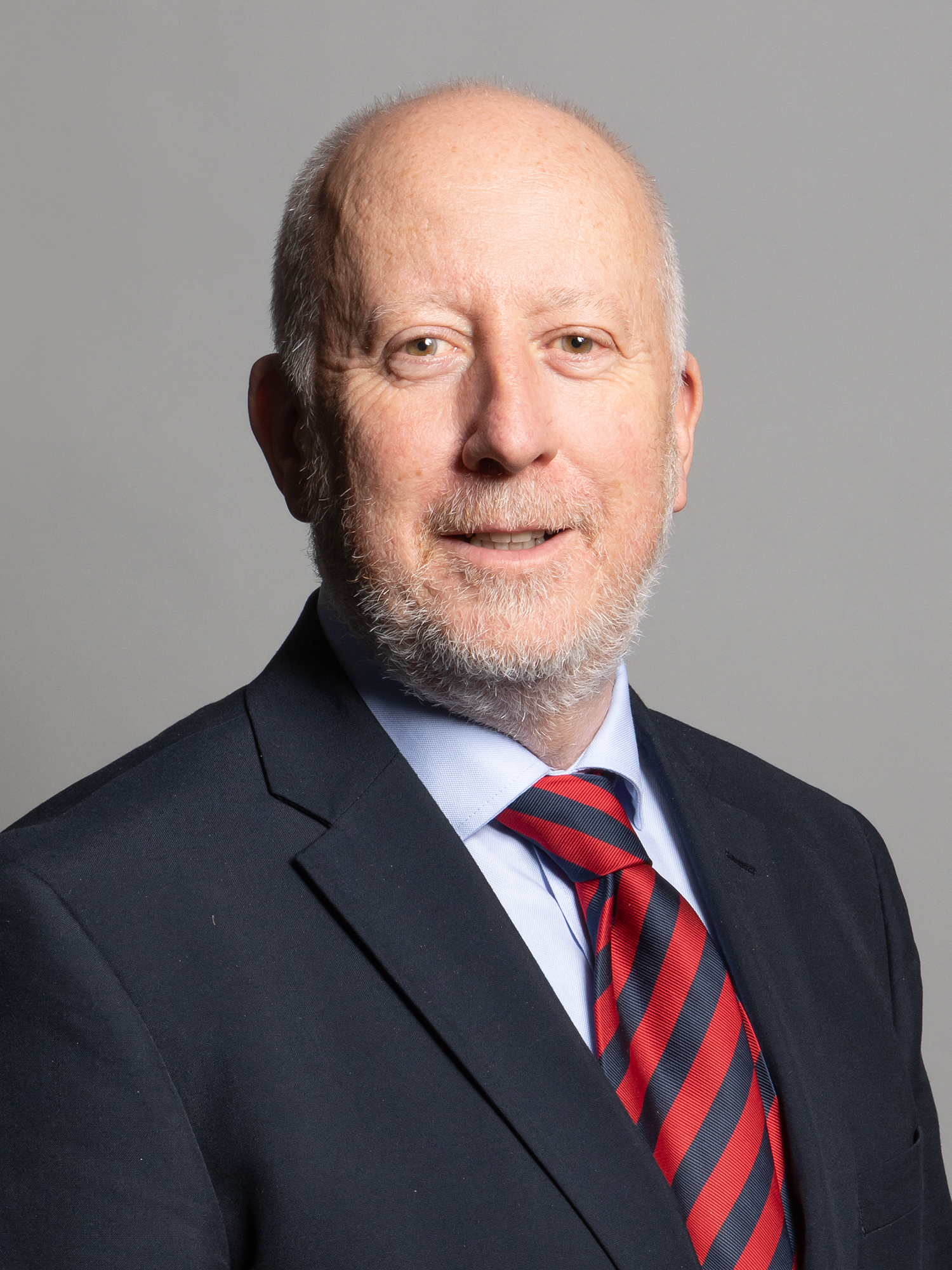
- Official portrait, 2020

Member of Parliament for Middlesbrough and Thornaby East Middlesbrough (2012–2024)
- Incumbent
- Assumed office 29 November 2012
- Preceded by: Stuart Bell
- Majority: 9,192 (26.7%)

Member of Middlesbrough Council for Westbourne
- In office 4 May 1995 – 6 May 1999
Shadow portfolios
Shadow Secretary of State
2020–2021	Employment Rights and Protections
2016–2020	Transport
Shadow Minister
2016–2016	Rail

Personal details
- Born: Andrew Joseph McDonald; 8 March 1958 (age 68) Middlesbrough, England
- Party: Labour
- Other political affiliations: Socialist Campaign Group
- Education: Leeds Polytechnic (BA)
- Website: andymcdonaldmp.org

Andrew Joseph McDonald (born 8 March 1958) is a British Labour Party politician and solicitor serving as Member of Parliament (MP) for Middlesbrough and Thornaby East (formerly Middlesbrough) since 2012.

McDonald served as Shadow Employment Secretary in Keir Starmer's shadow cabinet from 2020 until his resignation in 2021. Previously, he served as Shadow Secretary of State for Transport in Jeremy Corbyn's shadow cabinet from 2016 to 2020.

== Early life and education ==
Andrew McDonald was born on 8 March 1958, in the Acklam area of Middlesbrough.

He was educated at a number of local schools, including St. Francis Primary School, St. Edward's Primary School and St. George's Secondary School (which later became Trinity Catholic College, Middlesbrough). He attended St. Mary's Sixth Form College before studying a degree in law at Leeds Polytechnic.

== Legal career ==
Upon completing his law degree, McDonald worked as a solicitor for over 25 years. He was a senior solicitor at the Middlesbrough office of Thompsons Solicitors and led the firm's Serious Injury Unit for the Cumbria, Humberside, North East and Yorkshire areas. He was also the firm's Head of Military Claims for members of the British Armed Forces. Whilst working for the firm, McDonald acted as an adviser to the House of Commons Defence Select Committee for its 2003 report on Armed Forces Pensions and Compensation. He has also served as both Chair and as Secretary of the Association of Personal Injury Lawyers' Military Special Interest Group, and was a founder member of The Royal British Legion's Solicitors Group.

== Early political career ==
McDonald was active in local politics in Middlesbrough for many years. He served as a Labour councillor for Westbourne ward from 1995 to 1999. At the time of his selection as a parliamentary candidate, he was chairman of Middlesbrough Labour Party Local Government Committee.

Labour shortlisted McDonald as a potential candidate for the Middlesbrough South and East Cleveland constituency in the 2010 general election. However, Tom Blenkinsop was the eventual choice.

== Parliamentary career ==
McDonald was elected to Parliament when he won the Middlesbrough by-election held on 29 November 2012, retaining the seat for Labour following the death of Sir Stuart Bell. McDonald increased the party's share of the vote to 60.5%, though his majority was reduced by 500 to 8,211.

Since his election to Parliament, he has campaigned against the "Bedroom Tax" (part of the Welfare Reform Act 2012) and in favour of nationalisation of the East Coast Main Line franchise, arguing that the Scotland-London railway had been the only one in the country "which comes close to paying for itself" and that journey numbers, revenue and customer satisfaction had grown since nationalisation in 2009.

In February 2013, he was appointed as Parliamentary Private Secretary (PPS) to Emily Thornberry, the Shadow Attorney General. Following Ed Miliband's shadow cabinet reshuffle in October 2013, he became Parliamentary Private Secretary to Chuka Umunna, in Umunna's role as Shadow Secretary of State for Business, Innovation and Skills.

At the 2015 general election, McDonald was re-elected with an increased vote share of 56.8% and an increased majority of 12,477.

In January 2016, McDonald was appointed to Jeremy Corbyn's Shadow Cabinet to replace Jonathan Reynolds, who resigned as Shadow Minister for Rail in protest after Corbyn sacked Pat McFadden.

In June 2016, he was promoted to Shadow Transport Secretary during Corbyn's post-Brexit Shadow Cabinet reshuffle. In his time as Shadow Transport Secretary, McDonald oversaw the development of Labour's policy to nationalise the railways. On the 25th anniversary of the privatisation of the railways, McDonald said privatisation had failed since the taxpayer was "putting in even more money to the privatised system than when it was nationalised", and that nationalisation would allow a Labour government to cap fares and run the railways in the interest of passengers.

At the snap 2017 general election, McDonald was again re-elected with an increased vote share of 65.7% and an increased majority of 13,873.

In March 2018, McDonald was accused of comparing the situation in Gaza to the Holocaust by Karen Pollock, the chief executive of the Holocaust Educational Trust.

At the 2019 general election, McDonald was again re-elected, seeing his share of the vote decrease to 50.5% and his majority reduced to 8,395.

In April 2020, incoming leader Keir Starmer moved McDonald to the role of Shadow Secretary of State for Employment Rights and Protections. McDonald was the chair of Labour's "Power in the Workplace Taskforce" which provided input into Labour's Employment Rights' Green Paper published in September 2021. The paper stated that "Labour is demanding that the minimum wage is immediately raised to at least £10 per hour for all workers". In September 2021, McDonald resigned as Shadow Secretary, citing lack of support from Starmer for an increase in the minimum wage to £15 per hour. He said he had been instructed by Starmer's office to argue at the Labour Party Conference "against a national minimum wage of £15 an hour and against statutory sick pay at the living wage".

In April 2023, using parliamentary privilege when speaking in the House of Commons, McDonald alleged "shocking, industrial-scale corruption" surrounding the Teesworks free port development near Redcar. In May 2023, the government commissioned an independent review into the allegations. In the subsequent report published in January 2024, the review found no evidence to support allegations of corruption or illegality whilst going on to make recommendations to improve governance and transparency of the project.

In June 2023, McDonald condemned the government's proposal to house 1,500 asylum seekers on a barge, possibly in Middlesbrough.

In October 2023, McDonald lost the Labour whip after using the phrase "between the river to the sea" at a pro-Palestine rally. Consequently, he sat as an independent MP. In early November 2023, McDonald announced that he would sue Conservative MP Chris Clarkson over his response to his comments. McDonald had the Labour whip reinstated on 11 March 2024. This was confirmed by a Labour Party spokesperson. The party's investigation found that he had "not engaged in conduct that was against the party's rulebook". In a statement McDonald said, "It was never my intention to use words that would cause anyone distress or anguish and I bitterly regret the pain and hurt caused. Accordingly, I will not use that phrasing again."

Due to the 2023 Periodic Review of Westminster constituencies, McDonald's constituency of Middlesbrough was abolished, and replaced with Middlesbrough and Thornaby East. At the 2024 general election, McDonald was elected to Parliament as MP for Middlesbrough and Thornaby East with 47.2% of the vote and a majority of 9,192.

In June 2025, he was part of a rebellion over planned cuts to disability benefits, which won concessions from the government.

== Trustee and governor roles ==
McDonald was a governor of Abingdon Primary School for fifteen years until 2010, and became a governor of Middlesbrough College in 2012. He has also been chair of two charities in his constituency, the Davison Trust, which works with children with special needs, and the Teesside branch of Headway, which works with people with brain injuries.

Parliament of the United Kingdom
Preceded by Stuart Bell	Member of Parliament for Middlesbrough; 2012–2024	Constituency abolished
New constituency	Member of Parliament for Middlesbrough and Thornaby East; 2024–present	Incumbent
Political offices
Preceded by Lilian Greenwood	Shadow Secretary of State for Transport; 2016–2020	Succeeded by Jim McMahon
Preceded by Rachael Maskell	Shadow Secretary of State for Employment Rights and Protections; 2020–2021	Succeeded by Alison McGovern
