= Scene in Braemar – Highland Deer =

1857 painting by Edwin Landseer

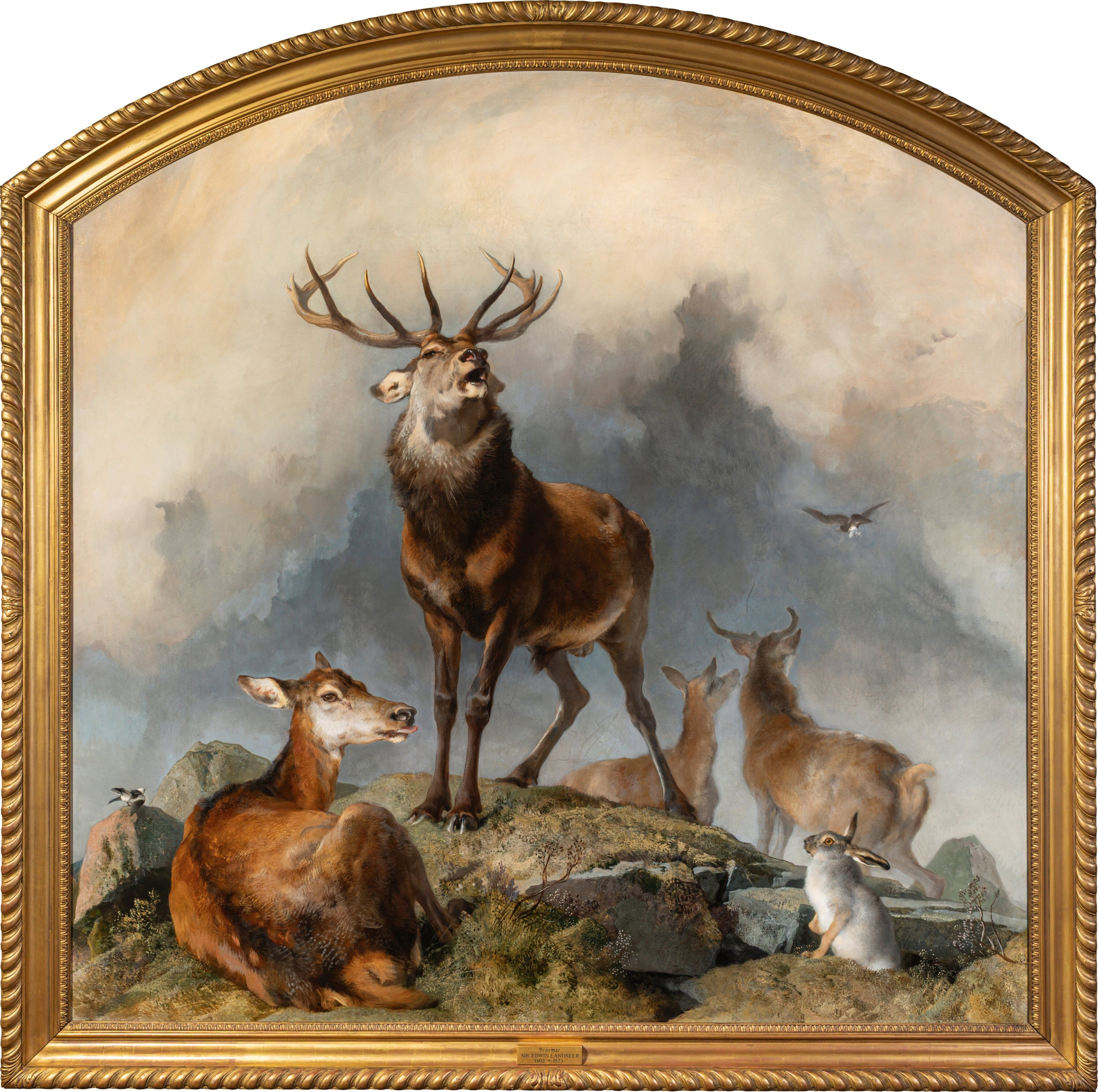

Scene in Braemar – Highland Deer is an 1857 oil painting by Edwin Landseer. It has a shaped canvas with an arched top, measuring around 270 cm × 270 cm (8 ft 10 in × 8 ft 10 in). With its large frame, it is almost 3 m × 3 m (9 ft 10 in × 9 ft 10 in).

The monumental canvas depicts a mature stag bellowing on a rocky hill in the Scottish Highlands, accompanied by two hinds, a young stag, a mountain hare, with an eagle flying past. Its title describes it as a scene in Braemar, an area in the eastern Highlands that Landseer frequently visited.

It was first exhibited at the Royal Academy Exhibition of 1857, lauded as one of his best works. It was commissioned by the English railway contractor Edward Betts and displayed high above a mirror at one end of the dining room in his new house at Preston Hall, near Aylesford in Kent. Betts was delighted with the painting and paid Landseer £800, more than the £600 that Landseer had requested. The crash of Overend, Gurney and Company was financially ruinous for Betts, and he was forced to sell the painting and many other possessions at Christie's in May 1868. The painting was bought for 4,000 guineas by Thomas Agnew & Sons, acting for the Middlesbrough iron smelter and MP Henry Bolckow for his house at Marton Hall. After his death in 1878, much of Bolckow's extensive collection of English paintings was inherited by his nephew Carl Bolckow, and Landseer's painting was sold at Christie's in 1888 for 4,950 guineas. It was bought again by Thomas Agnew & Sons, who sold it to Sir Edward Guinness, later 1st Earl of Iveagh. It remained in the Guinness family for over a century, spending the decade from 1983 to 1993 on loan to the National Gallery of Ireland. It was sold at Christie's again in 1994, from the estate of Iveagh's grandson, Bryan Guinness, 2nd Baron Moyne, for £793,500, and remained in a private collection until sold by Sotheby's in 2026, for £5,946,000.

It was exhibited more recently at a Landseer exhibition at the Philadelphia Museum of Art and then the Tate Gallery in 1981-82, and then at the Royal Scottish Academy in 2005, alongside Landseer's famous but much smaller painting from 1851, The Monarch of the Glen.

It was engraved several times: by Landseer's brother Thomas Landseer in 1859, by George Zobel in 1868, and by John Cother Webb in 1892.
