= Middlesbrough and Thornaby East =

UK Parliament constituency (since 2024)

Coordinates: 54.56°N 1.25°W

- Borough constituency for the House of Commons
- Interactive map of boundaries since 2024
- Location within North East England
- County: North Yorkshire (Tees Valley)
- Electorate: 75,123 (2024)
- Major settlements: Middlesbrough (part); Thornaby-on-Tees (part)

Current constituency
- Created: 2024
- Member of Parliament: Andy McDonald (Labour)
- Seats: One
- Created from: Middlesbrough; Stockton South (part)

Middlesbrough and Thornaby East is a constituency of the House of Commons in the UK Parliament. Further to the completion of the 2023 review of Westminster constituencies, it was first contested in the 2024 general election and is currently held by Andy McDonald of the Labour Party, who previously held the abolished constituency of Middlesbrough from 2012 to 2024.

== Constituency profile ==
Middlesbrough and Thornaby East is a constituency in the Teesside area of North Yorkshire. It covers most of the town of Middlesbrough (excluding some southern suburbs) and the northern and eastern parts of the town of Thornaby-on-Tees, which lies within the Borough of Stockton-on-Tees.

Middlesbrough is a large port town. It was a small settlement until the 1830s when it was selected as the location for an industrial port to ship the region's coal production. It rapidly grew to become a major centre for iron manufacturing and was nicknamed Ironopolis. Thornaby was mostly developed during the late 19th century to house industrial workers. Bombing damage during World War II and late 20th century de-industrialisation left Middlesbrough in economic decline, and today this constituency is one of the most deprived in the country. There are some wealthier suburbs in the south of Middlesbrough, like Acklam, but most of the town falls within the top 10% most-deprived areas in England. The average house price here is lower than the rest of North East England and around one-third the national average.

In general, residents of Middlesbrough and Thornaby East are young and have low levels of education and homeownership. Household income is low and the child poverty rate is more than double the UK-wide figure. Few residents work in professional occupations, with many working in the health and retail sectors, and a high percentage claim unemployment benefits. White people made up 78% of the population at the 2021 census. Asians, mostly of Pakistani origin, were the largest ethnic minority group at 13%. They were mostly concentrated in the centre of Middlesbrough where they made up around a third of the population.

At the local borough council level, most of the constituency is represented by the Labour Party with some independent councillors elected in the southern suburbs. Voters in the constituency strongly supported leaving the European Union in the 2016 referendum; an estimated 66% voted in favour of Brexit compared to the nationwide figure of 52%.

== Boundaries ==
The composition of the constituency is as follows (as they existed on 1 December 2020):

- The Borough of Middlesbrough wards of: Acklam; Ayresome; Berwick Hills & Pallister; Brambles & Thorntree; Central; Kader; Linthorpe; Longlands & Beechwood; Newport; North Ormesby; Park; Trimdon.
- The Borough of Stockton-on-Tees wards of: Mandale and Victoria; Stainsby Hill.

The seat is the successor to the Middlesbrough constituency, subject to alignment of the boundaries to take account of a revised local authority ward structure. In order for the electorate to be within the permitted range, the two Stockton-on-Tees wards, comprising the eastern part of the town of Thornaby-on-Tees, were transferred from Stockton South (abolished).

== Members of Parliament ==
Middlesbrough prior to 2024

Election	Member	Party
2024	Andy McDonald	Labour

== Elections ==
=== Elections in the 2020s ===
General election 2024: Middlesbrough and Thornaby East
Party	Candidate	Votes	%	±%
Labour	Andy McDonald	16,238	47.2	−6.8
Reform	Patrick Seargeant	7,046	20.5	+14.3
Conservative	Kiran Fothergill	6,174	17.9	−6.4
Workers Party	Mehmoona Ameen	2,007	5.8	N/A
Green	Matthew Harris	1,522	4.4	+2.9
Liberal Democrats	Mo Waqas	1,037	3.0	+0.4
Independent	Mark Baxtrem	383	1.1	N/A
Majority		9,192	26.7	−3.0
Turnout		34,407	45.8	−6.6
Labour hold		Swing		

=== Elections in the 2010s ===
2019 notional result
Party	Vote	%
Labour	20,290	54.0
Conservative	9,149	24.3
Independent	4,282	11.4
Brexit	2,324	6.2
Liberal Democrats	991	2.6
Green	553	1.5
Turnout	37,589	52.4
Electorate	71,742	

== See also ==
- List of parliamentary constituencies in North East England (region)
