= 1878 Middlesbrough by-election =

UK Parliament by-election

← 1874	5 July 1878	1880 →

Middlesbrough constituency
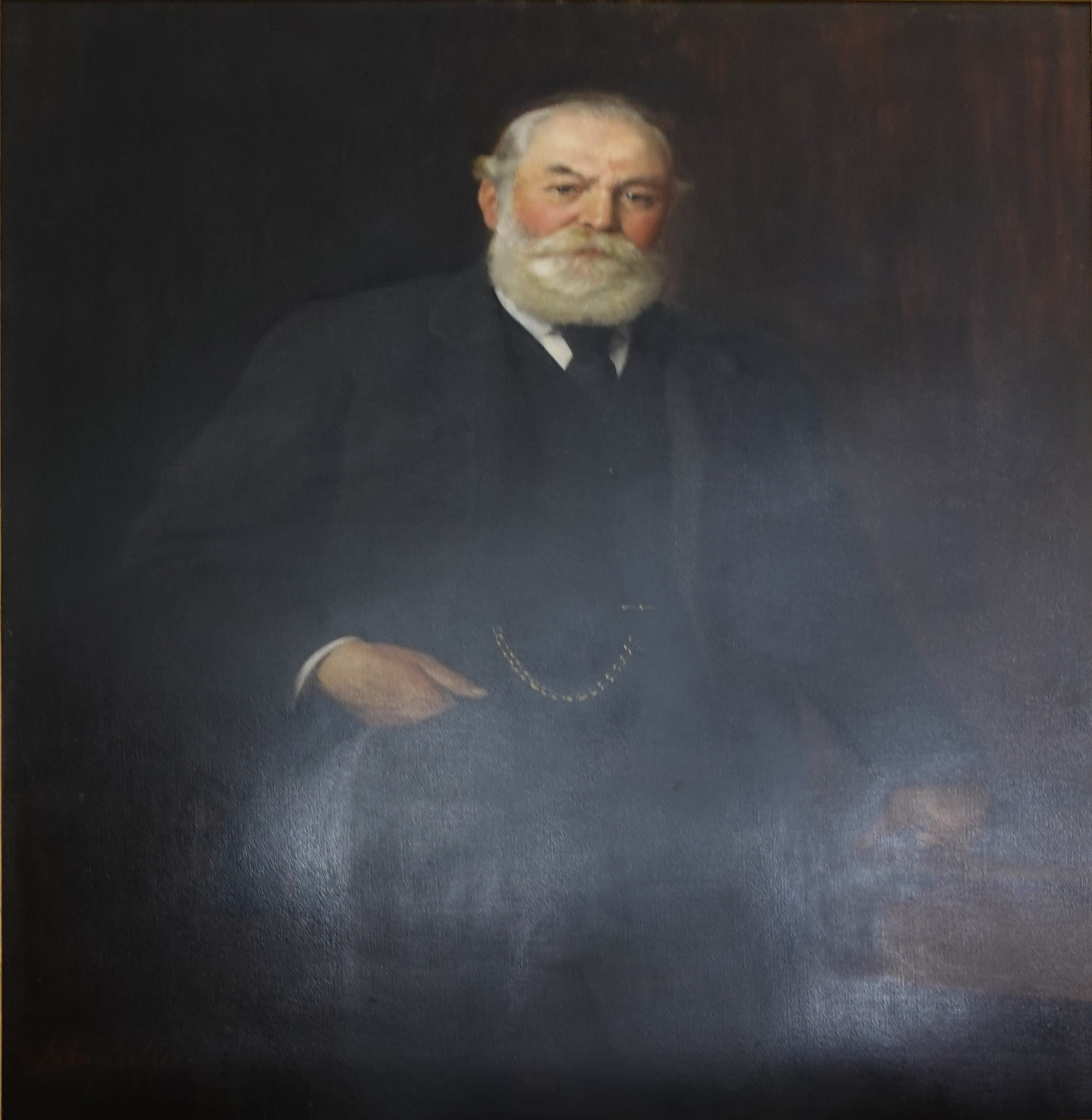

Candidate	Isaac Wilson	Samuel Sadler
Party	Liberal	Conservative
Popular vote	5,307	2,415
Percentage	68.7% ▲15.4 p.p.	31.3% ▲9.3 p.p.
MP before election
Henry Bolckow
Liberal
Elected MP
Isaac Wilson
Liberal

The 1878 Middlesbrough by-election was a parliamentary by-election held on 5 July 1878 to elect a new Member of Parliament (MP) for the British House of Commons constituency of Middlesbrough in the North Riding of Yorkshire.

== Vacancy ==
The vacancy was caused by the death on 18 June 1878 of the town's Liberal MP, Henry Bolckow.

The town of Middlesbrough had been enfranchised by the Representation of the People Act 1867, and at the United Kingdom general election the industrialist Henry Bolckow had been elected unopposed as its first Member of Parliament (MP). In 1853, he had become the town's first mayor.

== Candidates ==
Two candidates were nominated.

The Conservative Party candidate was Samuel Sadler, the owner of a major chemicals business in the town, and Mayor of Middlesbrough in 1877. The Liberal Party selected Isaac Wilson, whose railway locomotive business had been merged in 1865 to Hopkins, Gilkes & Co. Wilson had been Mayor in 1854.

== Result ==
The result was a victory was for Wilson, who held the seat for the Liberals with a comfortable majority of 37.4% of the votes.

Middlesbrough by-election, 5 July 1878
Party	Candidate	Votes	%	±%
Liberal	Isaac Wilson	5,307	68.7	+9.3
Conservative	Samuel Sadler	2,415	31.3	+15.4
Majority		2,902	37.4	+2.6
Turnout		7,722	65.3	−5.3
Liberal hold		Swing	+1.4	

== Aftermath ==
Wilson held the seat until he stood down at the 1892 general election.

Sadler did not stand again until the 1895 general election, when he was also unsuccessful. But he finally won the seat at the 1900 general election, 22 years after the by-election. He was defeated at the 1906 general election.
