= Stuart Bell =

British Labour Party politician (1938–2012)

Sir Stuart Bell
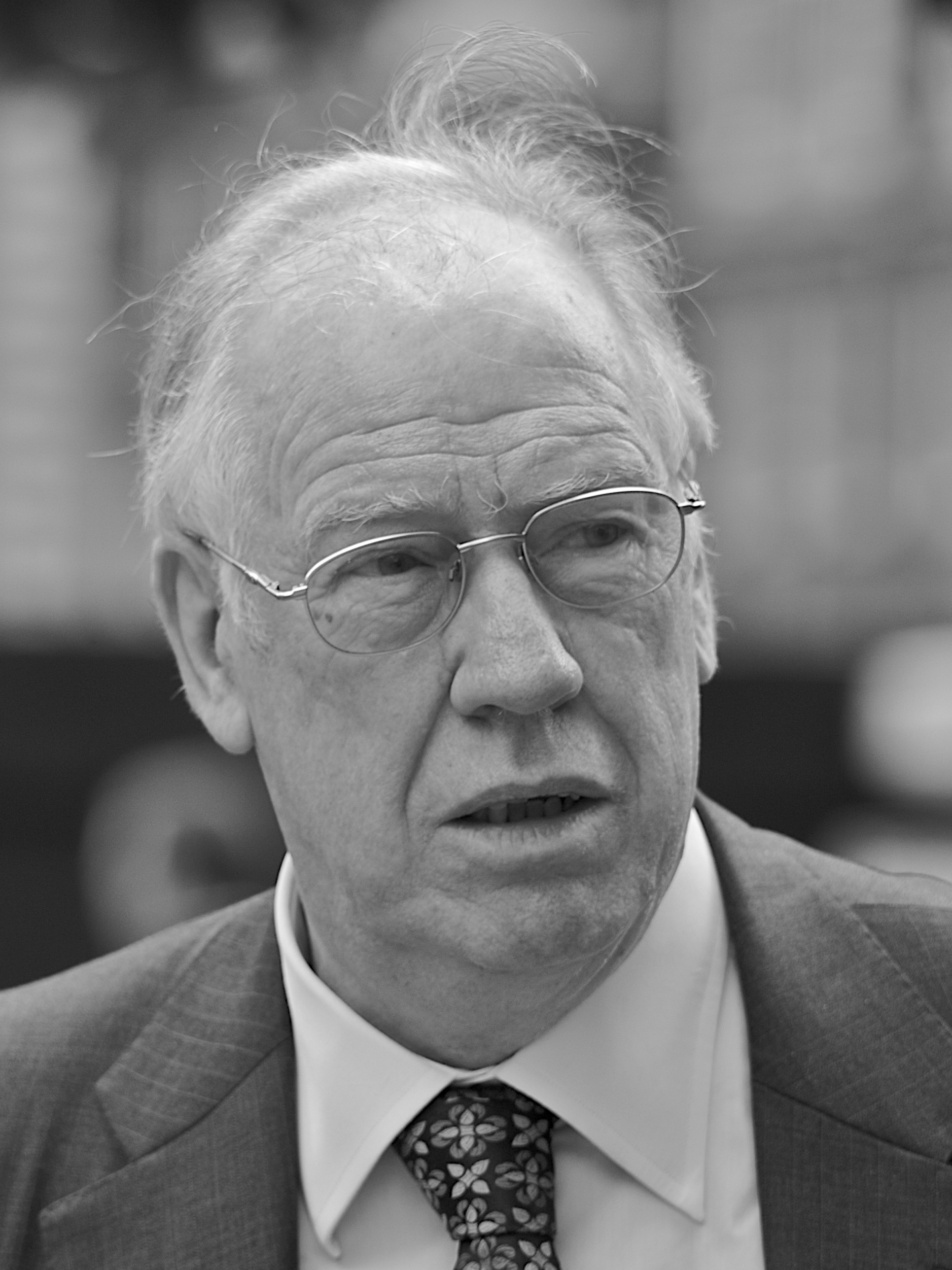

Second Church Estates Commissioner
- In office 2 May 1997 – 11 May 2010
- Prime Minister: Tony Blair; Gordon Brown
- Preceded by: Michael Alison
- Succeeded by: Tony Baldry

Member of Parliament for Middlesbrough
- In office 9 June 1983 – 13 October 2012
- Preceded by: Arthur Bottomley
- Succeeded by: Andy McDonald

Personal details
- Born: 16 May 1938 High Spen, County Durham, England
- Died: 13 October 2012 (aged 74) Middlesbrough, North Yorkshire, England
- Party: Labour
- Spouse(s): (1) Margaret Bruce (div.) (2) Margaret Allan

Sir Stuart Bell (16 May 1938 – 13 October 2012) was a British Labour Party politician, who was the Member of Parliament (MP) for Middlesbrough from the 1983 general election until his death in 2012. He was known as the longest serving Second Church Estates Commissioner, serving in this role during the entire period of Labour government from 1997 to 2010.

== Early life ==
Bell was born in County Durham in 1938, the son of a miner. He studied at the Hookergate Grammar School on School Lane in High Spen near Rowlands Gill, Gateshead. He later attended the Durham Pitmans College. He joined the Labour Party in 1964, and was called to the Bar at Gray's Inn in 1970. He worked as an international lawyer in Paris until 1977, representing large multi-national companies. He contested Hexham at the 1979 general election, but was defeated by the Conservative MP and former Cabinet Minister Geoffrey Rippon.

== Parliamentary career ==
Bell was elected to the City Council of Newcastle upon Tyne in 1980. In 1982, the Labour MP for Middlesbrough, Arthur Bottomley announced that he would step down at the next general election; Bell won the subsequent selection process to fight the seat at the 1983 general election. Bell comfortably held the seat, elected with a majority just short of 10,000 votes.

At Westminster, Bell became the Parliamentary Private Secretary to the Deputy Leader of the Opposition Roy Hattersley in 1983. He was promoted to the shadow frontbench in 1984 by Neil Kinnock as a Spokesman for Northern Ireland. However, he chose to resign his post after the Cleveland child abuse scandal which occupied two years of his life, after making unsubstantiated accusations of 'clinical error' against local paediatricians and child sexual abuse specialists. The paediatricians, Dr. Marietta Higgs and Dr. Geoffrey Wyatt, were later absolved and their forensic clinical work validated at a committee of inquiry overseen by Dame Elizabeth Butler-Sloss. The committee concluded that most of the diagnoses were incorrect. As a result, 94 of the 121 children were returned to their homes.

Following the 1992 general election and the election of John Smith as the Leader of the Labour Party, Bell returned to the shadow frontbenches as a spokesman for Trade and Industry. After the election of the Labour Government at the 1997 general election he was dropped from Labour's frontbench, but was appointed on the advice of Tony Blair as the Second Church Estates Commissioner, the spokesman for the Church of England in the House of Commons, a position he held from 1997 to 2010.

In 1998, Bell was one of 14 Labour MPs who voted against equalising the age of consent for homosexual activity. From 2000 to 2005 he was the Chairman of the Finance and Services Committee, which manages the annual budget of the House of Commons and its many employees. In 2005 he became a member of the Finance and Services Committee until 2008 when he served as chairman until 2010. Relatedly, from 2000 until 2010 he was a member of the House of Commons Commission, which oversees the administration of the House and the Members Estimate Committee that sets MPs' pay and pensions. He was a member of the Liaison Committee between 2000 and 2010. He was a member of the Ecclesiastical Committee from 1997.

Bell sat on the Members Estimates Committee at Parliament and was heavily involved representing MPs' interests in the MPs' expenses scandal of 2009. He was a member in Speaker's Committee for the Independent Parliamentary Standards Authority between 2009 and 2010. A founder member of the British-Irish Inter-Parliamentary Body, he was a Treasurer of the All-Party Parliamentary Group for the Promotion of First Past the Post. and was Secretary of the Franco-British Parliamentary Relations Committee in the Commons. In February 2010 Bell was played by David Calder in the television film On Expenses.

== Criticism and controversy ==
In 2002 his son, Malcolm, was jailed after admitting to stealing £8,000 from his father's colleagues, while he worked in Parliament.

On 13 October 2009, he claimed on the BBC Today programme that the investigation by Sir Thomas Legg into the United Kingdom Parliamentary expenses scandal was marked by "retrospectivity", as Sir Thomas had changed the rules on expenses after MPs' claims had been submitted.

Stuart Bell featured in a film of the 2010 general election entitled ToryBoy The Movie made by John Walsh, which explored the candidate's selection process and the work that goes into an election campaign. Later in 2011, Neil Macfarlane, in a report for local newspaper Teesside Gazette, asked "Are Teessiders getting enough from Sir Stuart Bell?" when he failed to answer over 100 telephone calls made to his constituency office over three months. The Gazette story was picked up by national newspapers. The Independent asked "is Sir Stuart Bell Britain's laziest MP?" The Guardian fact-checked the "laziest MP" claim and found that:

"Bell has been an MP for nearly 30 years and has had a distinguished career in parliament as a frontbench spokesman on trade and industry in opposition and the spokesman for the Church of England in the House of Commons and member of the House of Commons commission until last year. He's part of a breed of politicians – also including the Tory Edward Leigh and Labour's Gerald Kaufman – who have been extremely active parliamentarians but not always maintained an office in their constituency. One measure of their parliamentary work is the proportion of votes they turn up to... Bell's record doesn't cover him in glory, discounting frontbenchers, Northern Irish MPs, the Speaker and his deputies, he has the 10th worst attendance record with a 65.4% absence rate."

The Labour Party said it was looking into the allegations.

== Other interests ==
Bell was a member of the French think tank, the Fondation pour l'Innovation Politique. He was also a regular newspaper columnist for the Mail on Sunday and other publications.

== Personal life ==
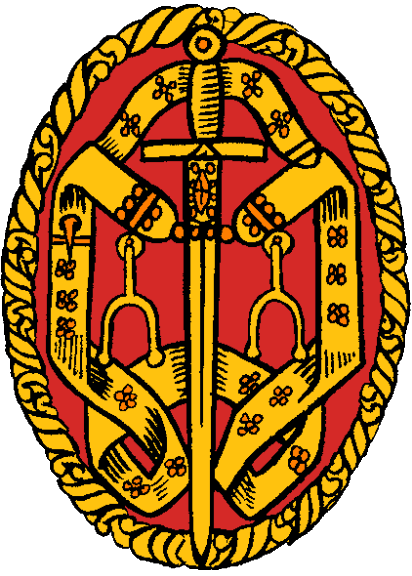
Insignia of Knight Bachelor

Bell was married in 1960 to Margaret Bruce and they had a son and a daughter. After his divorce, he married Margaret Allan in 1980 and they had a son.

== Honours ==
Bell was knighted in 2004 for his "services to Parliament" and was appointed a Chevalier of the Légion d'honneur, France's highest order, by President Jacques Chirac in 2006.

== Death ==
Bell died on 13 October 2012, aged 74, after a short battle with pancreatic cancer. A by-election was held in the Middlesbrough constituency.

== Publications ==
- Bell, Stuart (1973). Paris Sixty-Nine. Consett/Ramsden Williams Publications.
- Bell, Stuart (1981). How to abolish the Lords. Fabian Society.
- Bell, Stuart (1988). When Salem Came to the Boro: The True Story of the Cleveland Child Abuse Crisis.
- Bell, Stuart (2000). Tony Really Loves Me. SpenView Publications. ISBN 0-9538638-1-6.
- Bell, Stuart (2002). Pathway to the Euro. SpenView Publications. ISBN 0-9538638-2-4.
- Bell, Stuart (2002). The Honoured Society. SpenView Publications. ISBN 0-9538638-4-0.
- Bell, Stuart (2002). Binkie's Revolution. SpenView Publications. ISBN 978-0-9538638-3-9.
- Bell, Stuart (2007). An Ever Closer Union. SpenView Publications. ISBN 978-0-9538638-5-3.
- Bell, Stuart (2007). The Ice Cream Man and Other Stories. SpenView Publications. ISBN 978-0-9538638-4-6.
- Bell, Stuart (2010). The Ice Cream Man and Other Stories (second ed.). SpenView Publications. ISBN 978-0-9538638-4-6.

Political offices
Preceded by Michael Alison	Second Church Estates Commissioner; 1997–2010	Succeeded by Sir Tony Baldry
Parliament of the United Kingdom
Preceded by Arthur Bottomley	Member of Parliament for Middlesbrough; 1983–2012	Succeeded by Andy McDonald
