= Middlesbrough (constituency) =

UK Parliament constituency (1868–1918, 1974–2024)

- Former borough constituency for the House of Commons
- 2010–2024 boundary of Middlesbrough in the former county of Cleveland

- Location of the former county of Cleveland within England
- County: North Yorkshire (Tees Valley)
- Electorate: 59,744 (2018)

1974–2024
- Seats: One
- Created from: Middlesbrough East and Middlesbrough West
- Replaced by: Middlesbrough and Thornaby East

1868–1918
- Seats: One
- Type of constituency: Borough constituency
- Created from: North Riding of Yorkshire
- Replaced by: Middlesbrough East and Middlesbrough West

Middlesbrough was a parliamentary constituency in the United Kingdom, (Note: A borough constituency (for the purposes of election expenses and type of returning officer)) recreated in 1974, and represented in the House of Commons of the UK Parliament from 2012 until its abolition for the 2024 general election by Andy McDonald of the Labour Party. (Note: As with all constituencies, the constituency elects one Member of Parliament (MP) by the first past the post system of election at least every five years.) An earlier version of the seat existed between 1868 and 1918.

Under the 2023 Periodic Review of Westminster constituencies, the seat was abolished. Subject to expansion to include the Borough of Stockton wards of Mandale & Victoria, and Stainsby Hill, it was replaced by the new Middlesbrough and Thornaby East constituency.

== History ==
First creation

Parliament created this seat under the Representation of the People Act 1867 for the general election the next year, however the population expanded so was split into east/west areas in 1918. From 1950 until 1974, given intervening expansion of suburbs across the country, the Metropolitan Borough of Thornaby closer to Stockton on Tees was included in the Middlesbrough West constituency. Thornaby was enveloped into Teesside County Borough from 1974 and has not been part of the associated seats otherwise.

Second creation – current

The seat was recreated on similar boundaries to those which existed immediately before 1918.

Results of the winning party

The 2015 result made the seat the 36-safest of Labour's 232 seats by percentage of majority.

Since the constituency's re-creation in 1974, Middlesbrough has elected the Labour Party's candidate as its MP. (Note: Middlesbrough was revived for the February 1974 general election) In areas formerly part of Middlesbrough East, the MPs elected have been Labour since 1935. (Note: Middlesbrough East contributed more than half of its former area to the modern boundaries (as variously drawn after 1974))

Middlesbrough West took in rural and semi-rural areas outside the borough to the west, and was a marginal seat passing three times between the two largest parties after the Second World War, but a Liberal stronghold from 1918 until 1945; former soldier and iron and steel merchant Trevelyan Thomson ran unopposed at the polls for re-election in 1924.

Opposition parties

The 2012 by-election and 2015 general election saw UKIP finish second. The Liberal Democrats fielded second-placed candidates in 2005 and 2010. The Conservatives did in all elections between the seat's revival and 2001, and returned to second place in 2017. The Green Party outpolled the Liberal Democrats in 2015 in a field of five parties' candidates standing — the two parties failed to achieve 5% of votes cast leading them to forfeit their deposits.

Turnout

Turnout has ranged between 70.1% in 1987 and 48.8% in 2005.

== Boundaries ==
Map of 2010–2024 boundaries

1868–1885: The township of Linthorpe, and so much of the townships of Middlesbrough, Ormesby, and Eston as lie to the north of the road leading from Eston towards Yarm.

1885–1918: The existing parliamentary borough, and so much of the municipal borough of Middlesbrough as was not already included in the parliamentary borough.

1974–1983: The County Borough of Teesside wards of Berwick Hills, Marton, North Ormesby, St Hilda's, Thorntree, and Tollesby.

1983–1997: The Borough of Middlesbrough wards of Acklam, Beckfield, Beechwood, Berwick Hills, Gresham, Grove Hill, Kirby, Linthorpe, North Ormesby, Pallister, Park, St Hilda's, Southfield, Thorntree, and Westbourne.

1997–2010: The Borough of Middlesbrough wards of Acklam, Ayresome, Beckfield, Beechwood, Berwick Hills, Brookfield, Gresham, Grove Hill, Kader, Kirby, Linthorpe, North Ormesby, Pallister, Park, St Hilda's, Southfield, Thorntree, and Westbourne.

2010–2024: The Borough of Middlesbrough wards of Acklam, Ayresome, Beckfield, Beechwood, Brookfield, Clairville, Gresham, Kader, Grove Hill, Linthorpe, Middlehaven, North Ormesby and Brambles Farm, Pallister Park, Thorntree, and University.

The boundaries of the constituency were loosely based on the pre-1968 County Borough of Middlesbrough boundaries; the exclusions are its Easterside and Park End Wards, instead in Middlesbrough South and East Cleveland.

2024: Constituency was abolished as a result of 2023 Periodic Review of Westminster constituencies.

== Constituency profile ==
The constituency was mostly the urban city itself, largely in the sunset of its once world-leading steelmaking output. It suffers high unemployment and its adult population has mostly a low income; however, with modern advanced engineering, design and tourism, the city forms with nearby Redcar a bellwether for the North East region's economy firmly in the British forefront of a determined return to increasing national output. In November 2012, male and female unemployment (based on the more up-to-date claimant statistics) placed Middlesbrough topmost of 29 constituencies in the region, well ahead for example the City of Durham at the bottom of the list, with just 3.4% claimants whereas this area had 9.4% claimants.

In terms of housing stock, the authority is one of few authorities to see the proportion of detached and semi-detached homes increase (to 13.6% and 39.9%), in this instance this was coupled with a similar rise in flats to 11.9%, all at a loss to the share of terraced properties, down 4.7%.

== Members of Parliament ==
=== MPs 1868–1918 ===
Year	Member	Party
1868	Henry Bolckow	Liberal
1878	Isaac Wilson	Liberal
1892	Havelock Wilson	Ind. Labour
1893	Havelock Wilson	Lib-Lab
1900	Samuel Sadler	Conservative
1906	Havelock Wilson	Liberal
1910	Penry Williams	Liberal
1918	Constituency abolished	

=== MPs 1974–2024 ===
Election	Member	Party
Feb 1974	Arthur Bottomley	Labour
1983	Stuart Bell	Labour
2012 by-election	Andy McDonald (Note: In October 2023, McDonald was suspended from the Labour parliamentary party, after appearing at a pro-Palestine rally and stating: "We won't rest until we have justice, until all people, Israelis and Palestinians, between the river and the sea can live in peaceful liberty", which included a reference to the phrase "from the river to the sea"; the party described McDonald's comment as "deeply offensive".)	Labour
2024	Constituency abolished	

== Election results 1974–2024 ==
=== Elections in the 1970s ===
General election February 1974: Middlesbrough
Party	Candidate	Votes	%	±%
Labour	Arthur Bottomley	27,324	66.3	
Conservative	Geoffrey Dickens	13,915	33.7	
Majority		13,409	32.6	
Turnout		41,239	69.4	
Labour win (new seat)				

General election October 1974: Middlesbrough
Party	Candidate	Votes	%	±%
Labour	Arthur Bottomley	22,791	61.8	−4.5
Conservative	Edward Leigh	8,984	24.4	−9.3
Liberal	Chris Foote Wood	5,080	13.8	N/A
Majority		13,807	37.4	+4.8
Turnout		36,855	61.2	−8.2
Labour hold		Swing		

General election 1979: Middlesbrough
Party	Candidate	Votes	%	±%
Labour	Arthur Bottomley	24,872	56.2	−5.6
Conservative	C Fenwick	13,463	30.4	+6.0
Liberal	Peter Freitag	4,023	9.1	−4.7
Workers Revolutionary	M Simpson	1,018	2.3	N/A
Independent Labour	J Wilcox	861	2.0	N/A
Majority		11,409	25.8	−11.6
Turnout		44,237	67.9	+6.7
Labour hold		Swing		

=== Elections in the 1980s ===
General election 1983: Middlesbrough
Party	Candidate	Votes	%	±%
Labour	Stuart Bell	21,220	50.7	
Conservative	Lucille Campey	11,551	27.6	
Liberal	David Sanders	8,871	21.2	
Workers Revolutionary	M.A. Simpson	207	0.5	
Majority		9,669	23.1	
Turnout		41,849	66.4	
Labour win (new boundaries)				

General election 1987: Middlesbrough
Party	Candidate	Votes	%	±%
Labour	Stuart Bell	25,747	59.7	+9.0
Conservative	Robert Orr-Ewing	10,789	25.0	−2.6
Liberal	Philip Hawley	6,594	15.3	−5.9
Majority		14,958	34.7	+11.6
Turnout		43,130	71.0	+4.6
Labour hold		Swing		

=== Elections in the 1990s ===
General election 1992: Middlesbrough
Party	Candidate	Votes	%	±%
Labour	Stuart Bell	26,343	64.1	+4.4
Conservative	Paul R. Rayner	10,559	25.7	+0.7
Liberal Democrats	Rosamund Jordan	4,201	10.2	−5.1
Majority		15,784	38.4	+3.7
Turnout		41,103	69.8	−1.2
Labour hold		Swing	+1.9	

General election 1997: Middlesbrough
Party	Candidate	Votes	%	±%
Labour	Stuart Bell	32,925	71.4	
Conservative	Liam Benham	7,907	17.2	
Liberal Democrats	Alison Charlesworth	3,934	8.5	
Referendum	Robert Edwards	1,331	2.9	
Majority		25,018	54.2	
Turnout		46,097	65.0	
Labour win (new boundaries)				

=== Elections in the 2000s ===
General election 2001: Middlesbrough
Party	Candidate	Votes	%	±%
Labour	Stuart Bell	22,783	67.6	−3.8
Conservative	Alex Finn	6,453	19.1	+1.9
Liberal Democrats	Keith Miller	3,512	10.4	+1.9
Socialist Alliance	Geoffrey Kerr-Morgan	577	1.7	N/A
Socialist Labour	Kai Andersen	392	1.2	N/A
Majority		16,330	48.5	−5.7
Turnout		33,717	49.8	−15.2
Labour hold		Swing		

General election 2005: Middlesbrough
Party	Candidate	Votes	%	±%
Labour	Stuart Bell	18,562	57.8	−9.8
Liberal Democrats	Joe Michna	5,995	18.7	+8.3
Conservative	Caroline Flynn-Macleod	5,263	16.4	−2.7
BNP	Ron Armes	819	2.5	N/A
UKIP	Michael Landers	768	2.4	N/A
Independent	Jackie Elder	503	1.6	N/A
Independent	Derrick Arnott	230	0.7	N/A
Majority		12,567	39.1	−9.4
Turnout		32,140	48.8	−1.0
Labour hold		Swing	−9.0	

=== Elections in the 2010s ===
General election 2010: Middlesbrough
Party	Candidate	Votes	%	±%
Labour	Stuart Bell	15,351	45.9	
Liberal Democrats	Chris Foote-Wood	6,662	19.9	
Conservative	John Walsh	6,283	18.8	
Independent	Joan McTigue	1,969	5.9	
BNP	Michael Ferguson	1,954	5.8	
UKIP	Robert Parker	1,236	3.7	
Majority		8,689	26.0	
Turnout		33,455	51.4	
Labour win (new boundaries)				

2012 Middlesbrough by-election
Party	Candidate	Votes	%	±%
Labour	Andy McDonald	10,201	60.5	+14.6
UKIP	Richard Elvin	1,990	11.8	+8.1
Liberal Democrats	George Selmer	1,672	9.9	−10.0
Conservative	Ben Houchen	1,063	6.3	−12.5
Peace	Imdad Hussain	1,060	6.3	N/A
BNP	Peter Foreman	328	1.9	−3.9
TUSC	John Malcolm	277	1.6	N/A
Independent	Mark Heslehurst	275	1.6	N/A
Majority		8,211	48.7	+22.7
Turnout		16,866		
Labour hold		Swing		

General election 2015: Middlesbrough
Party	Candidate	Votes	%	±%
Labour	Andy McDonald	18,584	56.8	+10.9
UKIP	Nigel Baker	6,107	18.7	+15.0
Conservative	Simon Clarke	5,388	16.5	−2.3
Green	Hannah Graham	1,407	4.3	N/A
Liberal Democrats	Richard Kilpatrick	1,220	3.7	−16.2
Majority		12,477	38.1	+12.1
Turnout		32,706	52.9	+1.5
Labour hold		Swing	−2.0	

General election 2017: Middlesbrough
Party	Candidate	Votes	%	±%
Labour	Andy McDonald	23,404	65.7	+8.9
Conservative	Jacob Young	9,531	26.7	+10.2
UKIP	David Hodgson	1,452	4.1	−14.6
Independent	Terry Lawton	632	1.8	N/A
Liberal Democrats	Dawud Islam	368	1.0	−2.7
Green	Carl Martinez	250	0.7	−3.6
Majority		13,873	39.0	+0.9
Turnout		35,637	58.3	+5.4
Labour hold		Swing	−0.7	

General election 2019: Middlesbrough
Party	Candidate	Votes	%	±%
Labour	Andy McDonald	17,207	50.5	−15.2
Conservative	Ruth Betson	8,812	25.8	−0.9
Independent	Antony High	4,548	13.3	N/A
Brexit Party	Faye Clements	2,168	6.4	N/A
Liberal Democrats	Thomas Crawford	816	2.4	+1.4
Green	Hugh Alberti	546	1.6	+0.9
Majority		8,395	24.7	−14.3
Turnout		34,097	56.1	−2.2
Labour hold		Swing	−7.2	

== Election results 1868–1918 ==
=== Elections in the 1860s ===
General election 1868: Middlesbrough
Party	Candidate	Votes	%	±%
Liberal	Henry Bolckow	Unopposed		
Registered electors		5,196		
Liberal win (new seat)				

=== Elections in the 1870s ===
General election 1874: Middlesbrough
Party	Candidate	Votes	%	±%
Liberal	Henry Bolckow	3,719	59.4	
Lib-Lab	John Kane	1,541	24.6	
Conservative	William Randolph Innes Hopkins	996	15.9	
Majority		2,178	34.8	
Turnout		6,256	70.6	
Registered electors		8,862		
Liberal hold		Swing		

By-election 5 July 1878: Middlesbrough
Party	Candidate	Votes	%	±%
Liberal	Isaac Wilson	5,307	68.7	+9.3
Conservative	Samuel Sadler	2,415	31.3	+15.4
Majority		2,892	37.4	+2.6
Turnout		7,722	65.3	−5.3
Registered electors		11,824		
Liberal hold		Swing	+1.4	

- Caused by Bolckow's death.

=== Elections in the 1880s ===
General election 1880: Middlesbrough
Party	Candidate	Votes	%	±%
Liberal	Isaac Wilson	4,515	61.7	+2.3
Conservative	Samuel Sadler	1,626	22.2	+6.3
Lib-Lab	Edward Dillon Lewis	1,171	16.0	−8.6
Majority		2,889	39.5	+4.7
Turnout		7,312	68.7	−1.9
Registered electors		10,641		
Liberal hold		Swing	+2.4	

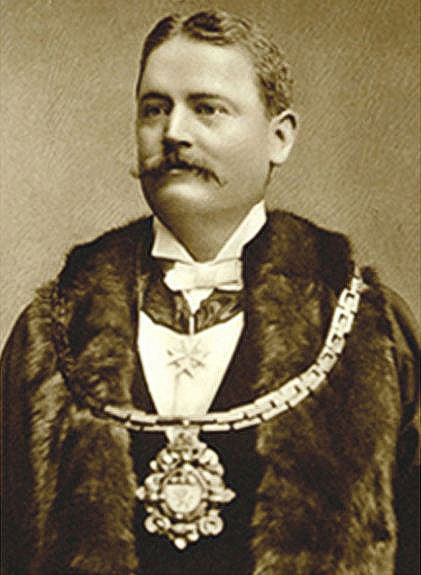
Dixon

General election 1885: Middlesbrough
Party	Candidate	Votes	%	±%
Liberal	Isaac Wilson	6,961	63.3	+1.6
Conservative	Raylton Dixon	4,035	36.7	+14.5
Majority		2,926	26.6	−12.9
Turnout		10,996	79.3	+10.6
Registered electors		13,864		
Liberal hold		Swing	−6.5	

General election 1886: Middlesbrough
Party	Candidate	Votes	%	±%
Liberal	Isaac Wilson	Unopposed		
Liberal hold				

=== Elections in the 1890s ===
Wilson

Robson

General election 1892: Middlesbrough
Party	Candidate	Votes	%	±%
Independent Labour	Havelock Wilson	4,691	38.8	
Liberal	William Robson	4,062	33.6	
Liberal Unionist	Hugh Bell	3,333	27.6	
Majority		629	5.2	
Turnout		12,086	79.6	
Registered electors		15,192		
Independent Labour gain from Liberal		Swing		

General election 1895: Middlesbrough
Party	Candidate	Votes	%	±%
Lib-Lab	Havelock Wilson	6,755	58.8	+20.0
Conservative	Samuel Sadler	4,735	41.2	+13.6
Majority		2,020	17.6	
Turnout		11,490	76.2	−3.4
Registered electors		15,077		
Lib-Lab gain from Independent Labour		Swing		

=== Elections in the 1900s ===
Sadler

General election 1900: Middlesbrough
Party	Candidate	Votes	%	±%
Conservative	Samuel Sadler	6,760	50.2	+9.0
Lib-Lab	Havelock Wilson	6,705	49.8	−9.0
Majority		55	0.4	
Turnout		13,465	77.8	+1.6
Registered electors		17,307		
Conservative gain from Lib-Lab		Swing	+9.0	

Wilson

General election 1906: Middlesbrough
Party	Candidate	Votes	%	±%
Lib-Lab	Havelock Wilson	9,271	52.6	+2.8
Conservative	Samuel Sadler	6,864	39.0	−11.2
Independent Labour	George Lansbury	1,484	8.4	N/A
Majority		2,407	13.6	
Turnout		17,619	86.7	+8.9
Registered electors		20,322		
Lib-Lab gain from Conservative		Swing	+7.0	

=== Elections in the 1910s ===
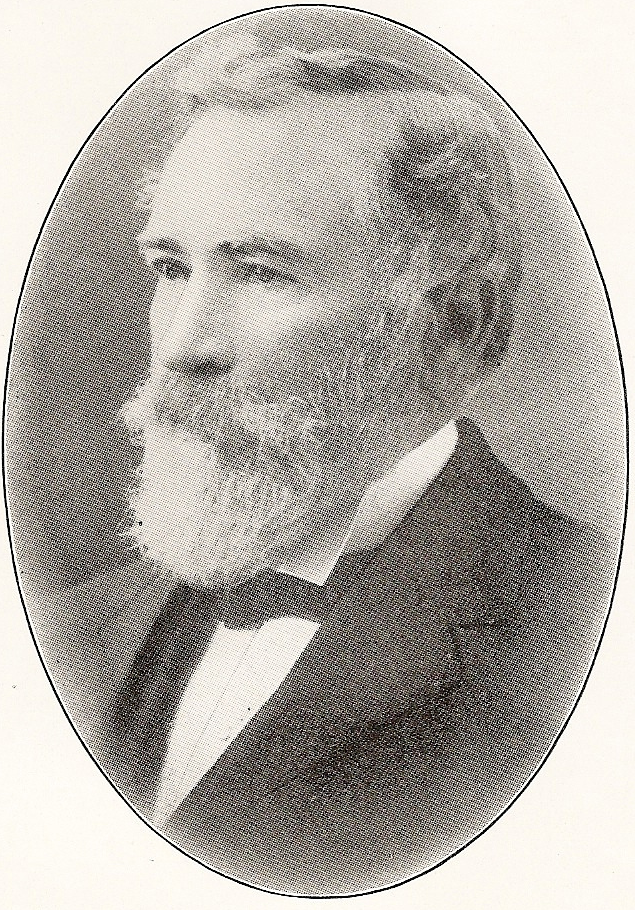
Walls

General election January 1910: Middlesbrough
Party	Candidate	Votes	%	±%
Liberal	Penry Williams	9,670	50.5	−2.1
Conservative	Arthur Charles Dorman	6,756	35.3	−3.7
Labour	Patrick Walls	2,710	14.2	N/A
Majority		2,914	15.2	+1.6
Turnout		19,136	88.0	+1.3
Registered electors		21,756		
Liberal hold		Swing	+0.8	

General election December 1910: Middlesbrough
Party	Candidate	Votes	%	±%
Liberal	Penry Williams	10,313	61.1	+10.6
Conservative	Thomas Gibson Poole	6,568	38.9	+3.6
Majority		3,745	22.2	+7.0
Turnout		16,881	77.6	−10.4
Registered electors		21,756		
Liberal hold		Swing	+3.5	

General Election 1914–15:

A General Election was required to take place before the end of 1915. The political parties had been making preparations for an election to take place and by July 1914, the following candidates had been selected;

- Liberal: Penry Williams
- Unionist: None

== See also ==
- List of parliamentary constituencies in Cleveland
- History of parliamentary constituencies and boundaries in Cleveland

== Sources ==
- Craig, F. W. S. (1989) [1977]. British parliamentary election results 1832–1885 (2nd ed.). Chichester: Parliamentary Research Services. ISBN 0-900178-26-4.
- Craig, F. W. S. (1989) [1974]. British parliamentary election results 1885–1918 (2nd ed.). Chichester: Parliamentary Research Services. ISBN 0-900178-27-2.
