= Isaac Wilson (English politician) =

British Liberal MP (1822–1899)

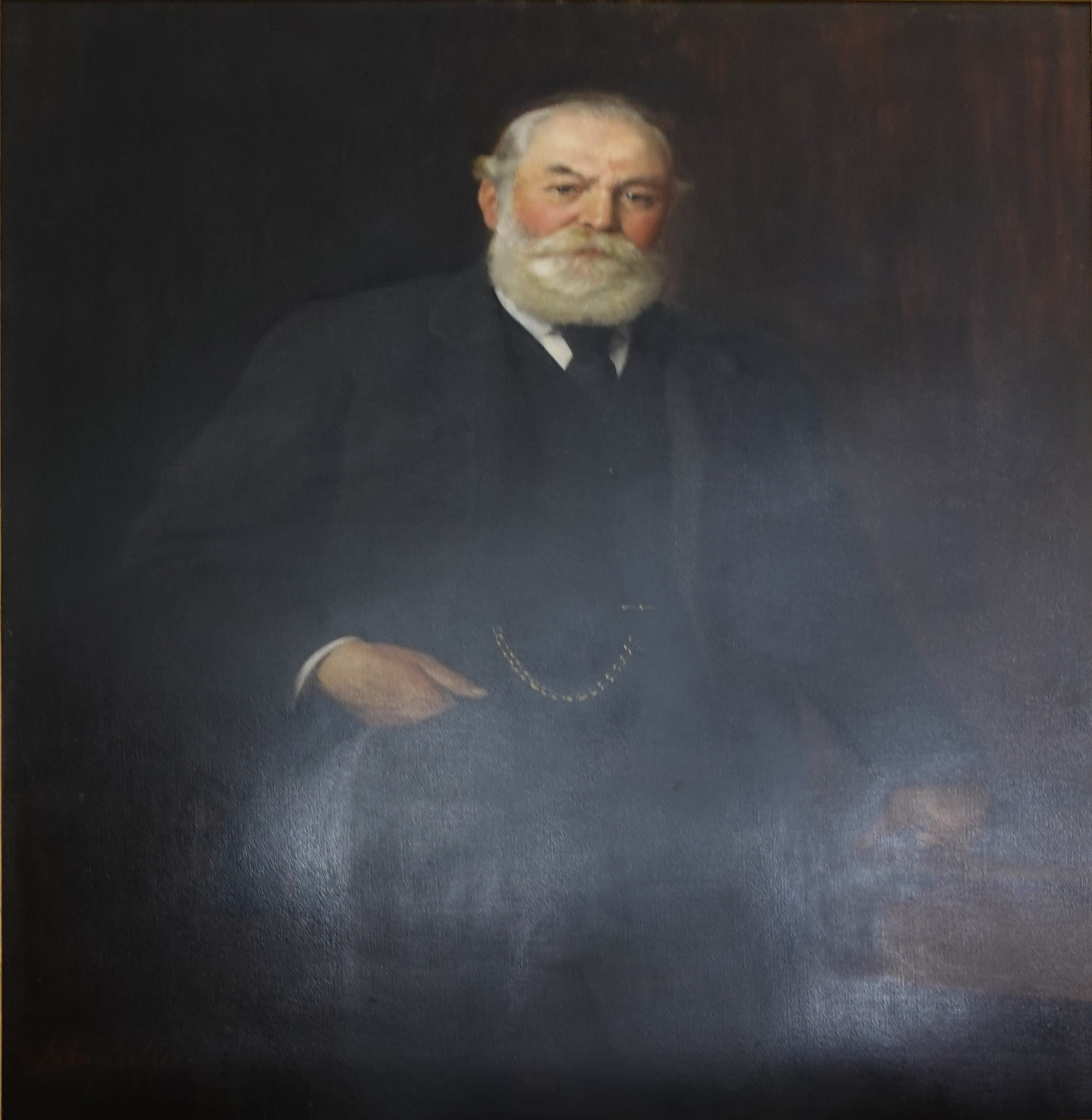
- Painting of Isaac Wilson by John Collier, currently in Dorman Museum

Member of Parliament for Middlesbrough
- In office 5 July 1878 – 26 July 1892
- Preceded by: Henry Bolckow
- Succeeded by: Havelock Wilson
- Majority: 6,961 (63.3%)

Personal details
- Born: 16 February 1822 Kendal, Westmorland
- Died: 22 September 1899 (aged 77)

Isaac Wilson (16 February 1822 – 22 September 1899) was an English industrialist and Liberal politician.

Wilson was born in Kendal, Westmorland, the son of Isaac Wilson and Mary Jowitt. He was related to the Pease family and in 1841 went to Middlesbrough where he managed a pottery in Commercial Street. Later, with Edward Gilkes, he established the Tees Engine Works at the corner of Commercial Street and Grey Street. The firm manufactured locomotives and other products for railway engineering on Teesside and in 1865, merged into a larger concern known as Hopkins, Gilkes & Co. Wilson was also a director of the Stockton and Darlington Railway. In 1850 he moved to Nunthorpe Hall. He contributed to the building of a school for 35 children in Nunthorpe in 1855 and was largely responsible for its maintenance

Wilson became involved in local politics and in 1854 became Mayor of Middlesbrough. He was elected at a by-election in July 1878 as Member of Parliament (MP) for Middlesbrough, and held the seat until he stood down from the House of Commons at the 1892 general election. He was President of the Teesside Chamber of Commerce from 1879 to 1887.

After Wilson's death aged 77, Nunthorpe Hall was occupied by Joseph Albert Pease MP.

Wilson was fiercely anti-drinking but is commemorated by the former J.D. Wetherspoon Isaac Wilson public house in Middlesbrough.

Parliament of the United Kingdom
Preceded by Henry William Ferdinand Bolckow	Member of Parliament for Middlesbrough; 1878 – 1892	Succeeded by Joseph Havelock Wilson
