= Henry Bolckow =

British businessman and politician (1806–1878)

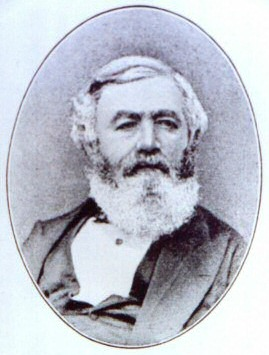
- Born: 8 December 1806; Sulten, Germany
- Died: 18 June 1878 (aged 71)
- Resting place: Marton, Middlesbrough
- Monuments: Statue, Exchange Square, Middlesbrough
- Occupations: Chairman, Bolckow Vaughan
- Spouse(s): Miriam Hay, Harriet Farrar
- Parent(s): Heinrich Bölckow, Caroline Dussher

Henry William Ferdinand Bolckow, originally Heinrich Wilhelm Ferdinand Bölckow, (8 December 1806 – 18 June 1878) was a Victorian industrialist and Member of Parliament, acknowledged as being one of the founders of modern Middlesbrough.

In a lifelong partnership with John Vaughan, Bolckow set up and ran an ironmaking business which became the company Bolckow Vaughan. It came to operate coal mines, limestone quarries and a major ironworks which stimulated the growth of Middlesbrough. Bolckow became the town's Mayor and its first Member of Parliament.

== Biography ==
=== Early life ===
Heinrich Bölckow, the son of Heinrich Bölckow of Varchow, in the region of Western Pomerania, and his wife, Caroline Duscher, was born at Sülten in the Duchy of Mecklenburg-Schwerin. When he was fifteen his parents placed him in a merchant's office in nearby Rostock, to learn about commerce, and there he made the acquaintance of Christian Allhusen, who in 1827 invited him to move to Newcastle upon Tyne to become his business partner in the corn trade.

=== Career in England ===
After several years in business in the north of England, Bölckow became a naturalised British subject in 1841 by act of Parliament and anglicised his name as "Henry Bolckow".

He was persuaded by the ironmaster of the Walkergate works in Newcastle, John Vaughan, to invest in the burgeoning iron trade. At the suggestion of Joseph Pease they set up their first iron foundry and rolling mill at Vulcan Street, Middlesbrough, where they processed pig iron imported from Scotland. In 1846 the pair opened Witton Park Ironworks, 20 miles (32 km) to the west of the town, where ironstone from Grosmont, could be smelted in blast furnaces to produce the pig iron for the Vulcan Street works. The high transport costs generated by this operation led the partners to look closer to home for their raw materials, and in the end they found what they were looking for on their own doorstep. In 1850, Vaughan and his geologist John Marley discovered large seams of iron ore at Eston, in the nearby Cleveland Hills. A year later they began mining there, and soon a branch railway line was built to transport the ore to Middlesbrough.

The rapid success of their business enabled them to expand their operations, acquiring coal mines, limestone quarries, brickworks, gasworks and a machine works.

=== Founding Bolckow, Vaughan ===
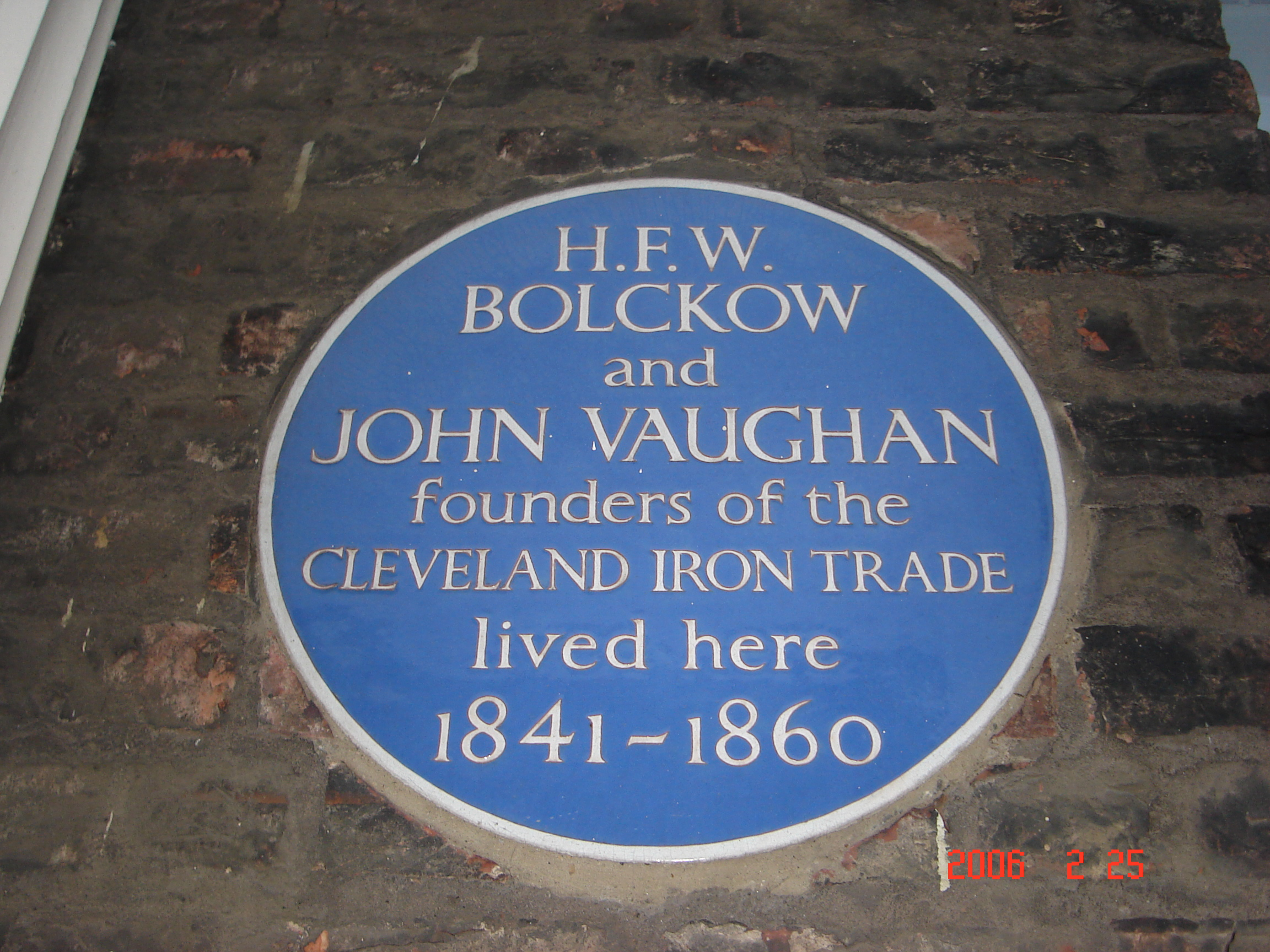
On Cleveland Buildings

In 1864, the firm of Bolckow, Vaughan was formed into a limited liability company with a capital of £2,500,000, and with Bolckow as its first chairman.

By 1868, Middlesbrough was producing four million tons of iron per year, and the town's population had risen to 40,000. It became a centre of such importance that, in 1853, the town received a charter of incorporation, Bolckow becoming the first Mayor of the new municipal corporation, with Vaughan following him two years later.

The introduction of the Bessemer process in the 1850s and the subsequent mass-production of both mild steel and hardened tooling steel impacted greatly on the iron manufacturers, as the new process could produce metals far more cheaply. The firm of Bolckow & Vaughan were slow to adapt, mainly because the local iron ore had a high phosphorus content and the original 'acid' Bessemer process required pig-iron low in phosphorus to produce usable steel; thus by the late 1870s the town was suffering a major economic downtown with unemployment running very high. In 1875 a rival firm, Dorman Long, was set up in the Middlesbrough area, producing steel from imported iron.

Bolckow was aware that the townsfolk worked long hours and lived in cramped conditions. He spent £20,000 purchasing and landscaping 70 acres (280,000 m^{2}) of land near the town centre to create a free public park for them. Albert Park was opened on 11 August 1868 and named in memory of Albert, Prince Consort, who like Bolckow came from Germany. The following year he spent £7,000 of his own money to build a school in the St Hilda's district of the town.

=== Later life ===
When the town was granted parliamentary representation under the Representation of the People Act 1867, Bolckow stood as a Liberal Party candidate. Bolckow was elected unopposed as its first Member of Parliament (MP) on 16 November 1868, and he held that position for 10 years until his death.

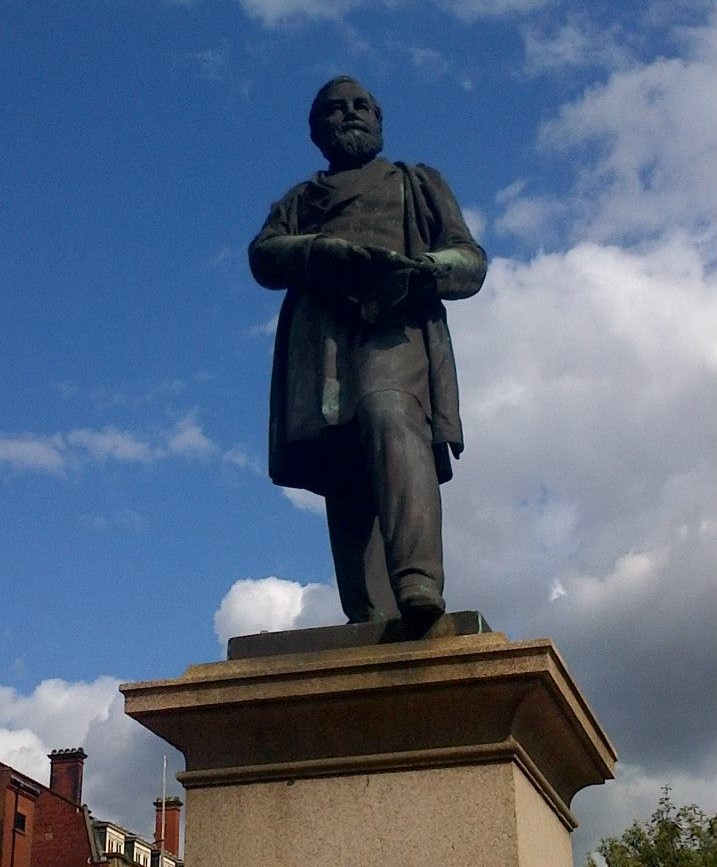
Statue of Bolckow, Middlesbrough by David Watson Stevenson, 1881

In 1877 Bolckow became ill, suffering from kidney disease. In May 1878 he was taken to Ramsgate, where it was thought the sea air would do him good. He made a temporary recovery but had a relapse and died on 18 June at the Granville Hotel, Ramsgate. He was 71. He was buried at St Cuthbert's Church, Marton, near to where his friend and partner Vaughan had been buried ten years before (9 September 1868). Their gravestones, which were neglected and fell into disrepair during the twentieth century, were restored in early 2009.

Henry was twice married. In 1841, he married a widow Miriam Hay, whose sister was married to Vaughan. Miriam died the following year and Henry remarried in 1851, when he wed Harriet, only daughter of James Farrar, of Halifax.

In his lifetime, Bolckow collected paintings, nearly all of them by living French and English artists. He owned two major paintings by Edwin Landseer: Scene in Braemar – Highland Deer acquired from a Christie's auction in 1868 for 4,000 guineas, and The Chief's Return from Deerstalking. He also owned paintings by the British artists Thomas Faed, Thomas Webster, David Cox, John Linnell, David Wilkie, Charles Eastlake, David Roberts and William James Muller. In 1872 he bought one of J.M.W. Turner’s paintings of Walton Bridges (subsequently in Norwich Castle Museum) from a Christie's auction for £5,250, and in 1874 he bought from a Christie's auction William Hogarth’s O The Roast Beef of Old England or The Gate of Calais (subsequently in the Tate Gallery) for £945. His Christie's acquisitions were generally conducted through the art dealers Agnew's.

A statue commemorating Henry Bolckow stands in Middlesbrough's Exchange Square, diagonally opposite the railway station.

During his spell as Mayor, Bolckow erected a granite urn dedicated to Captain James Cook in the grounds of his residence, Marton Hall, near to the reputed site of the cottage in which Cook was born. The Hall burnt down in 1960, but the urn remains in what is now Stewart Park, which also contains the Captain Cook Birthplace Museum. Bolckow's Mastiff, Lady Marton, became one of the foundation bitches of the modern breed.

Parliament of the United Kingdom
New constituency	Member of Parliament for Middlesbrough; 1868–1878	Succeeded by Isaac Wilson
