= George Young Blair =

Scottish marine engineer

George Young Blair JP
- Born: 10 March 1824; Pittenweem, Fife
- Died: 22 September 1894 (aged 70); Drumrauch Hall Hutton Rudby, Yorkshire
- Occupation: Marine engineer
- Spouse: Margaret Borrie (m. 1862; died 1888)
- Children: 4

George Young Blair JP (10 March 1824 – 22 September 1894) was a Scottish marine engineer, who specialised in the building of triple expansion engines at his factory Blair & Co., Ltd. in Stockton-on-Tees.

== Early life ==
Blair was born at Drumrauch Farm, Pittenweem, Fife, near Dundee, Scotland on 10 March 1824.

== Career ==
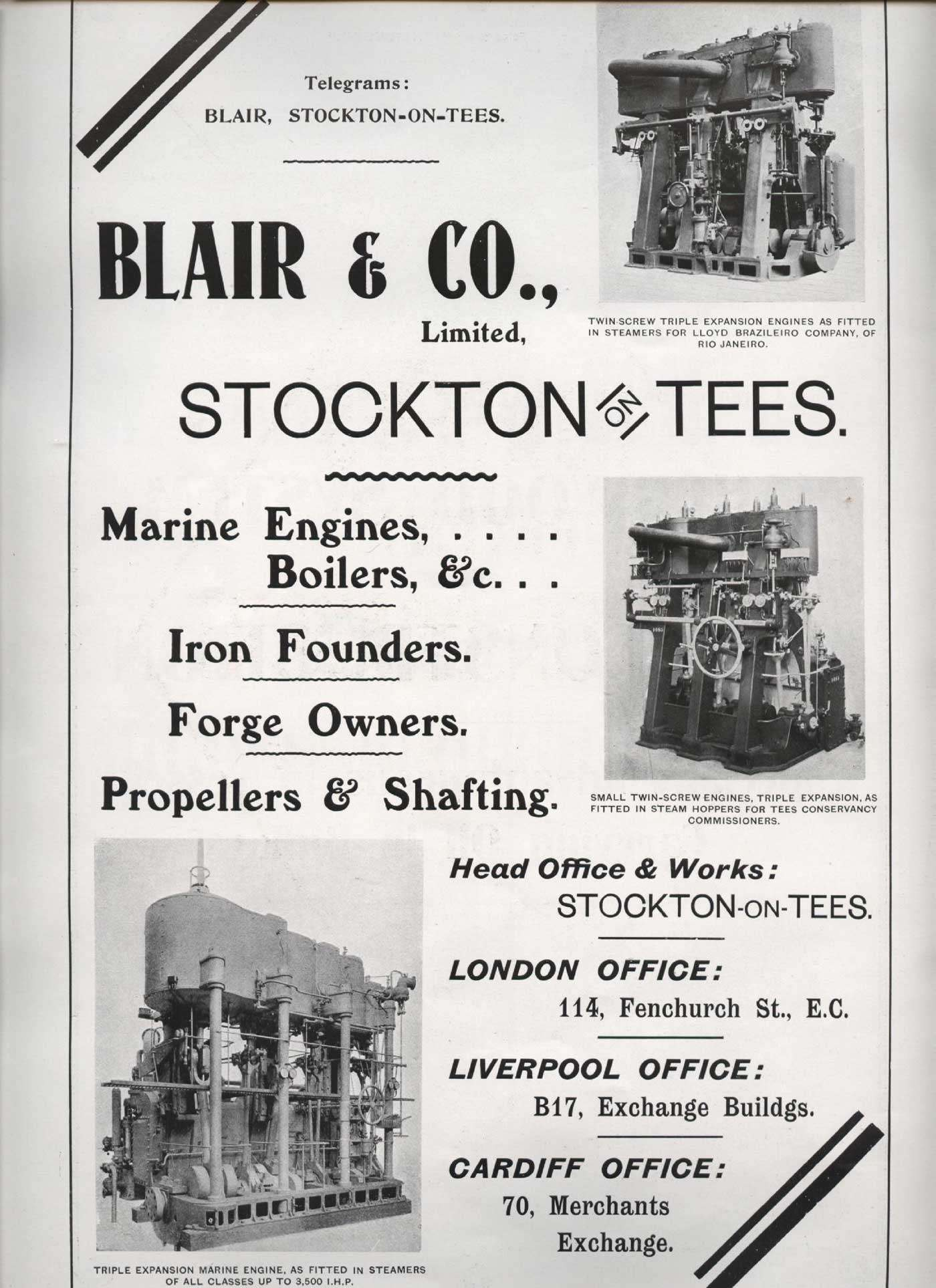

In 1855 George Blair was appointed manager of Fossick & Hackworth, becoming a partner in 1865. The firm was renamed Fossick, Blair & Co. on Hackworth's retirement, and when Fossick died in 1866 it became Blair & Co.

Blair's management led to the firm's specialising in marine engines. The 700 employees grew to 2 000, and the works covered seven and a half acres. Blair produced the first compound steam engine built on the Tees in January 1869 and fitted it to the Glenmore built by Backhouse & Dixon. This was followed in 1884 by its first triple-expansion engine, fitted to the Burgos which had been built by Richardson, Duck and Company.

In 1887 Blair constructed massive sheerlegs next to the Tees. These were capable of lifting 100 tons of marine engine into new ships. By 1914 the yard had turned out some 1 400 marine engines, followed by 75 during World War I. After the War the firm was taken over by Gould Steamships and Industrials in 1919.

Blair also served as a Justice of the Peace for County Durham.

== Personal life ==
On 4 September 1862 Blair married Margaret Borrie (1836–1888), daughter of Peter Borrie and Jean Simson, at St. Hilda's Church, Middlesbrough, Yorkshire, North Riding, England. He constructed the family home, Drumrauch Hall, and bought Linden Grove, also at Hutton Rudby in Yorkshire. Together, George and Margaret were the parents of:

- Peter Borrie Blair (1866–1891), who died in Stockton of typhoid.
- Mary Young Blair (1867–1935), who married Percy Sadler, eldest son of industrialist Sir Samuel Sadler.
- Florence Jean Blair (c. 1869–1917), who died unmarried.
- Margaret Amy Blair (1870–1907), who married Smollett Clerk Thomson, a Scottish bank agent, in 1899.

Blair died at Drumrauch Hall on 22 September 1894.
