= Samuel Sadler =

British politician

Samuel Sadler JP VD
- Sadler MP, circa 1906
- Born: 1842
- Died: 29 September 1911 (aged 68–69)
- Education: University of London
- Occupations: chemist, industrialist, public servant, MP
- Known for: founder, Sadler and Company
- Spouses: Rachael Sadler Field (m. 1865; death 1873), Mercy Sadler Field (m. 1874)
- Children: 4+5
- Parents: James Sadler (father); Mary Ann Millership (mother)
- Relatives: John Sadler, uncle

Sir Samuel Alexander Sadler JP VD (1842 – 29 September 1911) was a British industrialist, public servant and the first Conservative Member of Parliament for Middlesbrough, United Kingdom, the town with which his name is associated.

== Background ==
Samuel Alexander was the son of James Sadler and Mary Ann Millership of Langley Hall, near Oldbury, Worcestershire (now Oldbury, West Midlands). Members of the Sadler family contributed greatly to their native district of Oldbury and the Black Country during the nineteenth century, particularly Samuel Alexander's paternal uncle, John Sadler.

== Career ==
Sadler was a chemist by profession and, having studied at the University of London, reputedly under Michael Faraday, he established the successful chemicals business of Sadler and Company Limited based at Middlesbrough – Teesside's first oil and chemicals company.

He founded the firm in 1869 as a tar distillery and wood distillery. In 1880 he took over the neighbouring company of Jones & Sharp. It became a limited company in 1883 and subsidiary works were opened at Ulverston, Portsmouth, Carlton and Stockton. Products included coal gas, ammonia soda, ammonium sulphate, sulphuric acid, muriatic acid (HCl), nitric acid, caustic soda, sodium dichromate, oxalic acid, benzoles, carbolic acid (phenol), naphtha light oils, creosote, heavy oil, pitch and coke. The original works closed in 1971.

It was due to the efforts of pioneers such as Sadler that Teesside became established as a leading centre of the chemicals industry in the United Kingdom. He was also a colliery owner and had interests in several colliery companies in County Durham.

A 434 NRT steamship was named for him in 1876.

== Public service ==
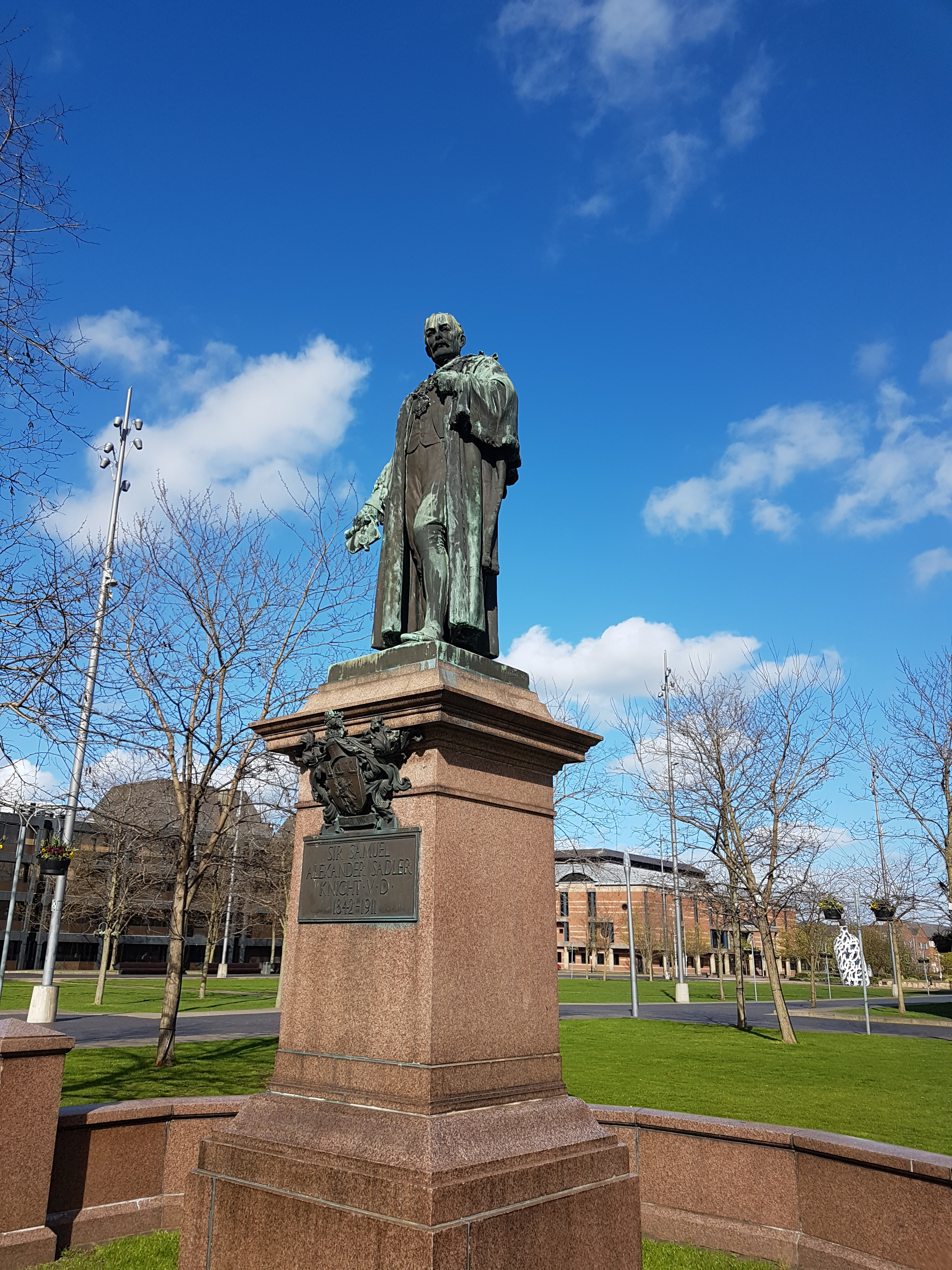
The Sir Samuel Alexander Sadler statue in Centre Square, Middlesbrough

Beside his work as an industrialist, Sadler served on Middlesbrough Council from 1873 and became Mayor on three occasions – 1877, 1896 and 1910. He succeeded at the third attempt to be elected as the first Conservative Member of Parliament for the Middlesbrough constituency and unseated his predecessor Joseph Havelock Wilson in the firmly Liberal seat at the 1900 general election, but was defeated by Wilson at the 1906 general. In addition, he became a Freeman of the Borough, served as Justice of the Peace, Alderman and was honoured with a knighthood on 24 July 1905.

Sadler was greatly interested in the Volunteer Force and served as Commanding Officer and later Honorary Colonel of the 1st Durham Rifle Volunteers, which became the 1st Volunteer Battalion of the Durham Light Infantry. He received the Volunteer Decoration. As a result of his efforts in this field, and as a reflection of his popularity due to repeated displays of popular philanthropy, Sadler was affectionately referred to as 'the Colonel'.

Two years following his death, a statue commemorating his service to the town was fashioned by Édouard Lantéri and erected by subscription in Victoria Square, Middlesbrough.Middlesbrough, MB03, Statue, Monument to Sir Samuel Sadler There is a photograph in the Frith collection. The statue was temporarily moved in 2004 so that construction could be performed on the square.

== Marriages and Issue ==
Samuel Alexander Sadler married firstly Rachael Sadler Field (1847–1873), his first cousin once removed, daughter of John Field and Mercy Ann Sadler of Oldbury in 1865, by whom he had four children; the eldest, Percy, marrying Mary Young Blair, the daughter of George Young Blair. His second son by his first wife, Cecil James Sadler (b. 1868), married Amy Ropner, daughter of fellow Teesside magnate Sir Robert Ropner, 1st Baronet (1838–1924) of Preston Hall, near Stockton-on-Tees.

In 1874, the year after his wife's death, Sadler married her sister Mercy Sadler Field (b. 1853), by whom he had a further five children.

== Ancestors ==
Ancestors of Samuel Sadler

8. William Sadler (c. 1751–1817)
4. Benjamin Sadler (1777–1850)
18. Samuel Hadley
9. Sarah Hadley (1754–1822)
19. Sarah Medley
2. James Sadler (1817–1878)
10. Thomas Johnson
5. Nancy Johnson (1776–1852)
11. Mary Tunks/Tonks
1. Sir Samuel Alexander Sadler (1842–1911)
6. Thomas Millership
3. Mary Ann Millership (1818–1871)

== Further Sources ==
Record of Sir Samuel Alexander Sadler's parliamentary contributions in Hansard might be viewed on the following link.Mr Samuel Sadler (Hansard)

Parliament of the United Kingdom
| Preceded by Joseph Havelock Wilson | Member of Parliament for Middlesbrough; 1900–1906 | Succeeded by Joseph Havelock Wilson |
