= Zaggora =

British-based company specialising in women's activewear and health foods

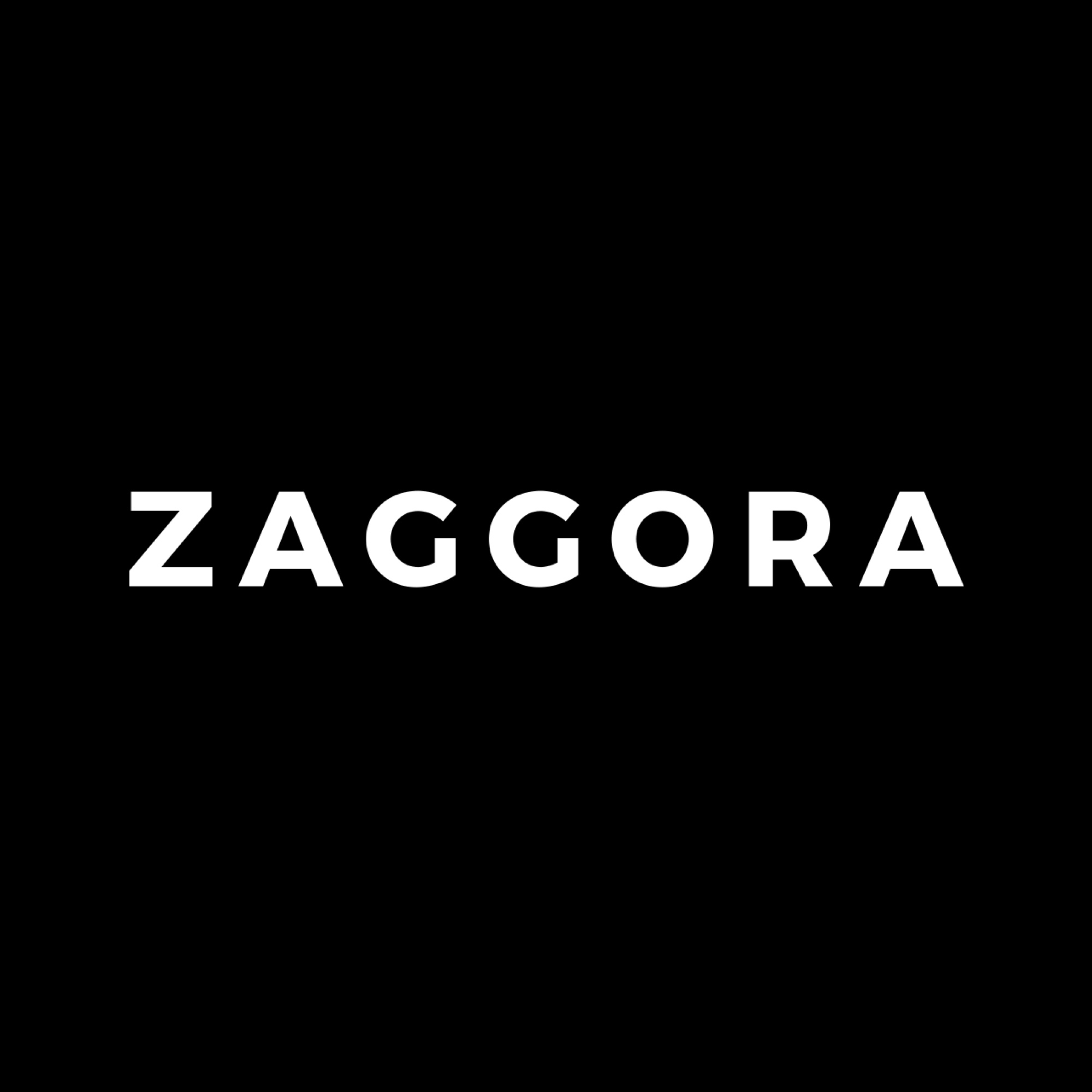
- Industry: Retail
- Founded: 2011
- Headquarters: London, United Kingdom
- Key people: Dessi Bell (Founder), Malcolm Bell (entrepreneur)(Founder)
- Products: Clothing; Sportswear; Sports equipment
- Website: Zaggora.com

Zaggora is a British-based company specialising in women's activewear and health foods that is best known for their Hotpants and Hotwear clothing line. According to London’s Evening Standard, in 2013 the company was valued at over £100m.

== History ==
The idea behind Zaggora originated from Dessi Bell’s wedding preparations, when she designed a method to lose weight in a short time span. She proceeded to develop several prototypes of sports pants, and in 2011 she and her husband, Malcolm Bell (entrepreneur), founded Zaggora with a £25,000 investment from private savings.

The company generated revenues that reached £10m in their first year of trading.

Zaggora has formed partnerships with major retailers including Equinox Fitness, Boots UK, Dick's Sporting Goods, Selfridges, and others. The company has launched a series of health foods including protein smoothies, superfood shots, and detox teas.

In 2014 Zaggora were investigated by the Advertising Standards Authority (ASA) in regard to irregularities with claimed price reductions and misleading advertising. The allegations were upheld, and Zaggora was instructed not to continue to run the advertisements and to ensure that future claims were not misleading.
