= Official Opposition frontbench =

In the UK Parliament; Shadow Cabinet and shadow ministers

The frontbench of His Majesty's Loyal Opposition in the Parliament of the United Kingdom consists of the Shadow Cabinet and other official shadow ministers of the political party currently serving as the Official Opposition. The Opposition front bench provide Parliamentary opposition to the British Government frontbench and has been the Conservative Party since 5 July 2024. The current Leader of the Opposition is Kemi Badenoch, following her victory in the 2024 Conservative Party Leadership Election.

== Key ==
Sits in the House of Commons
Sits in the House of Lords
Privy Counsellor
Shadow Cabinet full members **in bold**
Shadow Cabinet attendees **in bold italics**

== Leader of the Opposition and Shadow Cabinet Office ==
Office of the Leader of the Opposition
Leader of the Opposition; Leader of the Conservative Party; Shadow First Lord of the Treasury; Shadow Minister for the Civil Service	**Kemi Badenoch**
Deputy Leader of the Opposition; Deputy Leader of the Conservative Party	**Alex Burghart**
Shadow Minister for Policy Renewal and Development	**Neil O'Brien**
Parliamentary Private Secretary to the Leader of the Opposition	**John Glen**
Parliamentary Private Secretary to the Leader of the Opposition	Jack Rankin
Shadow Minister without Portfolio	**Kevin Hollinrake**

Shadow Cabinet Office
Shadow Chancellor of the Duchy of Lancaster	**Alex Burghart**
Parliamentary Under-Secretary of State	Charlie Dewhirst
Shadow Minister for the Cabinet Office	Mike Wood
Shadow Minister for AI	Ben Spencer
Shadow Minister	The Baroness Finn

Equalities Office
Shadow Minister for Women and Equalities	**Joy Morrissey**
Parliamentary Private Secretary	Shivani Raja
Shadow Minister	Baroness Cash

== Foreign relations ==
Foreign, Commonwealth and Development Affairs
Shadow Secretary of State for Foreign, Commonwealth and Development Affairs	**Tom Tugendhat**
Shadow Minister for Foreign Affairs	Wendy Morton
Shadow Minister for Foreign Affairs	Alicia Kearns
Parliamentary Under-Secretary of State	Lincoln Jopp
Parliamentary Under-Secretary of State	David Reed
Shadow Minister for Foreign Affairs	The Lord Callanan
Shadow Minister for Foreign Affairs	The Earl of Courtown

Defence
Shadow Secretary of State for Defence	**James Cartlidge**
Shadow Minister for Defence	Mark Francois
Shadow Minister for Defence	Stuart Anderson
Parliamentary Under-Secretary of State	David Reed
Parliamentary Under-Secretary of State	Ben Obese-Jecty
Shadow Minister for Defence	The Baroness Goldie
Shadow Minister for Defence	The Earl of Minto

== Law and order ==
Home Department
Shadow Home Secretary	**Chris Philp**
Shadow Minister	Matt Vickers
Shadow Minister	Alicia Kearns
Parliamentary Under Secretary of State	Sarah Bool
Parliamentary Under Secretary of State	Blake Stephenson
Shadow Minister	Lord Cameron of Lochiel
Shadow Minister	The Lord Davies of Gower

Justice
Shadow Secretary of State for Justice; Shadow Lord Chancellor	**Nick Timothy**
Shadow Minister of State	Kieran Mullan
Parliamentary Under-Secretary of State	Sarah Bool
Shadow Minister	The Lord Keen of Ellie

Attorney General's Office
Shadow Attorney General for England and Wales; Shadow Advocate General for Northern Ireland	Lord Wolfson of Tredegar
Shadow Advocate General for Scotland	The Lord Keen of Ellie
Shadow Solicitor General	Jerome Mayhew

== Economy ==
Treasury
Shadow Chancellor of the Exchequer	**Andrew Griffith**
Shadow Chief Secretary to the Treasury	**Richard Fuller**
Shadow Paymaster General and Minister for the Taxpayer	Harriett Baldwin
Shadow Financial Secretary to the Treasury	Gareth Davies
Shadow Exchequer Secretary to the Treasury	John Cooper
Shadow Economic Secretary to the Treasury	Mark Garnier
Shadow Pensions Minister	Peter Bedford
Shadow Minister	The Baroness Neville-Rolfe
Shadow Minister	The Lord Altrincham

Business, Innovation, Science and Trade
Shadow Secretary of State for Business and Trade	**Claire Coutinho**
Shadow Secretary of State for Business and Trade	**Julia Lopez** (acting)
Shadow Minister of State	Julia Lopez
Shadow Minister of State	Mark Garnier
Shadow Parliamentary Under Secretary of State	Bradley Thomas
Shadow Parliamentary Under Secretary of State	Peter Fortune
Shadow Minister	The Lord Sharpe of Epsom
Shadow Minister	Lord Hunt of Wirral
Shadow Minister	The Lord Moynihan

== Social services ==
Education
Shadow Secretary of State for Education	**Laura Trott**
Shadow Minister	Saqib Bhatti
Shadow Parliamentary Under-Secretary of State	Rebecca Smith
Shadow Parliamentary Under-Secretary of State	Patrick Spencer
Shadow Minister	Baroness Cash

Health and Social Care
Shadow Secretary of State for Health and Social Care	**Damian Hinds**
Shadow Minister	Caroline Johnson
Parliamentary Under-Secretary of State	Neil Shastri-Hurst
Parliamentary Under-Secretary of State	Greg Stafford
Shadow Minister	The Lord Kamall

Work and Pensions
Shadow Secretary of State for Work and Pensions	**Helen Whately**
Shadow Minister	Andrew Snowden
Shadow Pensions Minister	Peter Bedford
Shadow Minister	Baroness Stedman-Scott
Shadow Minister	Baroness Spielman
Shadow Parliamentary Under-Secretary of State	Joe Robertson

== Environment ==
Energy Security and Net Zero
Shadow Secretary of State for Energy Security and Net Zero	**Andrew Bowie**
Shadow Minister	Harriet Cross
Shadow Minister	Luke Evans
Shadow Minister	The Lord Blencathra
Shadow Parliamentary Under-Secretary of State	Ashley Fox

Environment, Food and Rural Affairs
Shadow Secretary of State for Environment, Food and Rural Affairs	**Victoria Atkins**
Shadow Minister	Robbie Moore
Shadow Minister	Neil Hudson
Parliamentary Under-Secretary of State	Aphra Brandreth
Shadow Minister	The Lord Blencathra
Shadow Minister	Lord Roborough

== Culture ==
Culture, Media and Sport
Shadow Secretary of State for Culture, Media and Sport	Rebecca Paul
Shadow Minister	Louie French
Shadow Minister	James Wild
Shadow Minister	The Lord Parkinson of Whitley Bay
Shadow Minister	Lord Moynihan

== Transport ==
Transport
Shadow Secretary of State for Transport	**Richard Holden**
Shadow Minister of State	Greg Smith
Shadow Minister	The Lord Moylan
Shadow Parliamentary Under-Secretary of State	Alison Griffiths

== Devolved and local government ==
Housing, Communities and Local Government
Shadow Secretary of State for Housing, Communities and Local Government	Katie Lam
Shadow Minister	David Simmonds
Parliamentary Under-Secretary of State	Lewis Cocking
Shadow Minister	The Lord Jamieson
Shadow Minister	Baroness O'Neill of Bexley
Shadow Minister for Housing and Planning	Gareth Bacon

Northern Ireland
Shadow Secretary of State for Northern Ireland	**Alex Burghart**
Parliamentary Under-Secretary State	Charlie Dewhirst
Shadow Minister	The Lord Caine

Scotland
Shadow Secretary of State for Scotland	**Harriet Cross**
Parliamentary Private Secretary	Douglas Lumsden
Shadow Minister	The Lord Cameron of Lochie

Wales
Shadow Secretary of State for Wales	**Mims Davies**
Shadow Minister	The Baroness Bloomfield of Hinton Waldrist

== Parliament ==
House Leaders
Shadow Leader of the House of Commons	**Jesse Norman**
Shadow Deputy Leader of the House of Commons	John Lamont
Shadow Leader of the House of Lords	**The Lord True**
Shadow Deputy Leader of the House of Lords	The Earl Howe -->

House of Commons Whips
Opposition Chief Whip	**Rebecca Harris**
Opposition Deputy Chief Whip	Gagan Mohindra
Opposition Deputy Chief Whip	Paul Holmes
Senior Opposition Whip	Alicia Kearns
Senior Opposition Whip	David Simmonds
Senior Opposition Whip	Greg Stafford
Senior Opposition Whip	Ashley Fox
Senior Opposition Whip	Rebecca Smith
Senior Opposition Whip	Lincoln Jopp
Senior Opposition Whip	David Reed
Junior Opposition Whip	Charlie Dewhirst
Junior Opposition Whip	Blake Stephenson
Junior Opposition Whip	John Cooper
Junior Opposition Whip	Sarah Bool
Junior Opposition Whip	Bradley Thomas
Junior Opposition Whip	Alison Griffiths
Junior Opposition Whip	Aphra Brandreth
Junior Opposition Whip	Patrick Spencer
Junior Opposition Whip	Lewis Cocking
Junior Opposition Whip	Joe Robertson

House of Lords Whips
Opposition Chief Whip in the House of Lords	**Baroness Williams of Old Trafford**
Deputy Chief Whip in the House of Lords	Baroness Scott of Bybrook
Opposition Lords Whip	The Baroness Bloomfield of Hinton Waldrist
Opposition Lords Whip	Lord Evans of Rainow
Opposition Lords Whip	The Earl of Courtown
Opposition Lords Whip	Baron Ashcombe of Boldre
Opposition Lords Whip	Baron Reay of Reay

== See also ==
- British Government frontbench
- Cabinet of the United Kingdom
- Leader of the Opposition (United Kingdom)
- List of British shadow cabinets
- Official Opposition Shadow Cabinet
- Parliamentary opposition
- Shadow Cabinet
