= Opposition frontbench of Kemi Badenoch =

Political party role in the UK

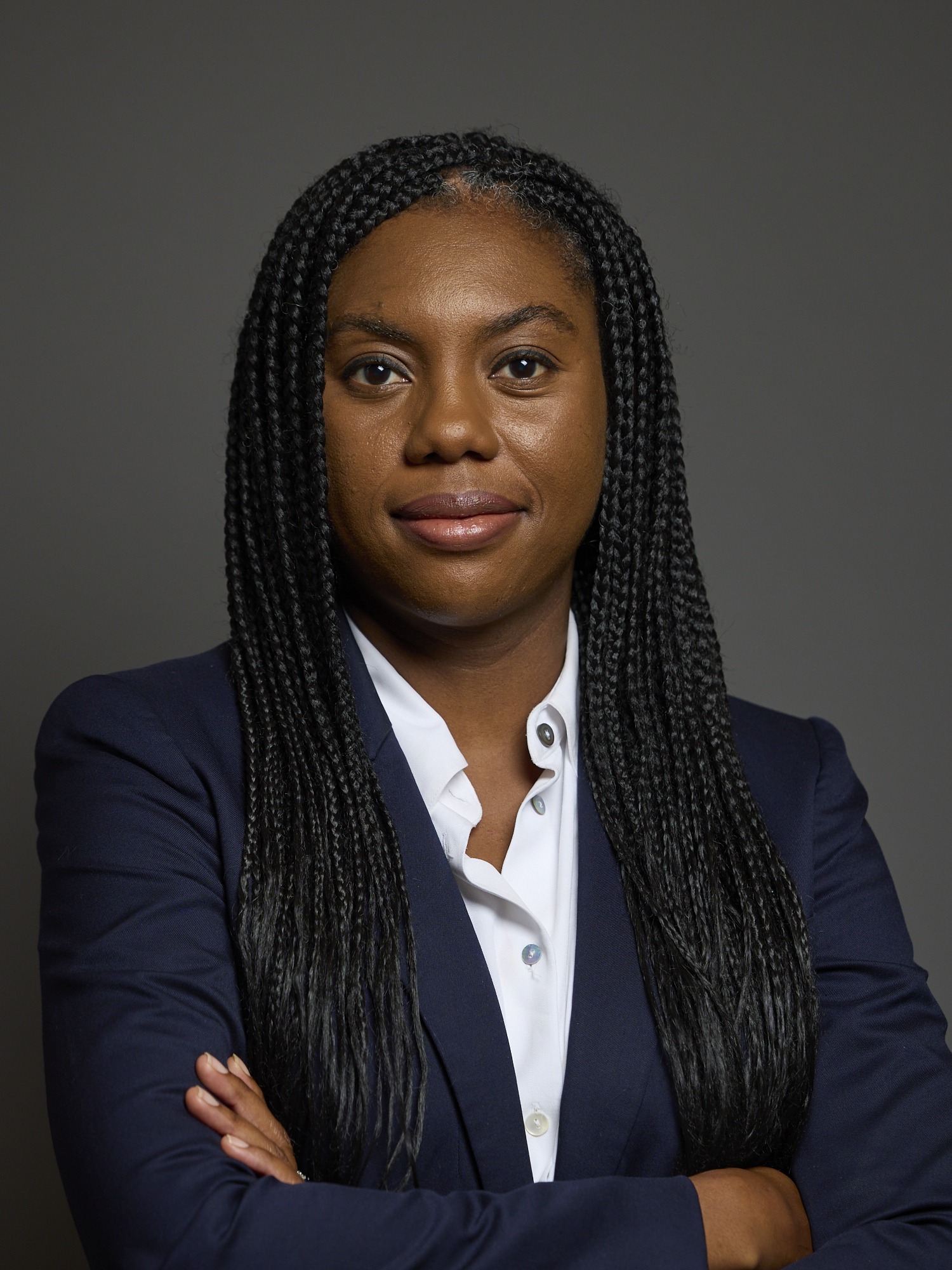
Official portrait of Kemi Badenoch in 2024

The frontbench of His Majesty's Loyal Opposition in the Parliament of the United Kingdom consists of the Shadow cabinet and other shadow ministers of the political party currently serving as the Official Opposition. Since 2024, His Majesty's Loyal Opposition is the Conservative Party, and the Leader of the Opposition is Kemi Badenoch.

== Formation and changes ==
The full shadow cabinet was announced on 5 November 2024. Junior appointments were made on 6 November. On 18 November it was confirmed that all of the 26 new Conservative MPs elected at the 2024 general election were given positions in opposition. On 20 November, the full frontbench team was confirmed.

On 22 July 2025, a Conservative party spokesperson announced that there would be a frontbench reshuffle, with James Cleverly set to return to the frontbench in a "prominent" role. The reshuffle had initially expected to involve small changes, though the BBC later reported that there would be a bigger change to the frontbench.

A significant reshuffle occurred in August 2026, with several changes to the Shadow Cabinet and shadow departments, including the departures of Cleverly, Priti Patel and Mel Stride and the appointments of Tom Tugendhat, Katie Lam and Damian Hinds.

== List of shadow ministers ==
Sits in the House of Commons
Sits in the House of Lords
Privy Counsellor
Shadow Cabinet full members **in bold**
Shadow Cabinet attendees **in bold italics**

=== Leader of the Opposition and Cabinet Office ===
Office of the Leader of the Opposition
Leader of the Opposition; Leader of the Conservative Party; Shadow First Lord of the Treasury; Shadow Minister for the Civil Service	**Kemi Badenoch**	November 2024 – present
Deputy Leader of the Opposition; Deputy Leader of the Conservative Party	**Alex Burghart**	September 2026 – present
Shadow Minister for Policy Renewal and Development	**Neil O'Brien**	July 2025 – present
Parliamentary Private Secretary to the Leader of the Opposition	Julia Lopez	November 2024 – July 2025
Parliamentary Private Secretary to the Leader of the Opposition	**John Glen**	July 2025 – present
Parliamentary Private Secretary to the Leader of the Opposition	Jack Rankin	September 2026 – present
Shadow Minister without Portfolio; Chairman of the Conservative Party	**Kevin Hollinrake**	July 2025 – present
Deputy Chairman of the Conservative Party	Matt Vickers	July 2025 – present

Cabinet Office
Shadow Chancellor of the Duchy of Lancaster	**Alex Burghart**	November 2024 – present
Shadow Paymaster General	**Richard Holden**	November 2024 – July 2025
Shadow Minister for the Cabinet Office	Mike Wood	November 2024 – present
Parliamentary Private Secretary	Charlie Dewhirst	November 2024 – September 2026
Shadow Minister for the Union	Charlie Dewhirst	September 2026 – present
Shadow Minister for AI	Ben Spencer	September 2026 – present
Shadow Minister	The Baroness Finn	November 2024 – present

Equalities Office
Shadow Minister for Equalities	**Claire Coutinho**	November 2024 – August 2026
Shadow Minister for Women	**Mims Davies**	November 2024 – August 2026
Shadow Minister for Women and Equalities	**Joy Morrissey**	August 2026 – present
(Co-minister for Women and Equalities with Mims Davies while Claire Coutinho is on Maternity Leave)	**Saqib Bhatti**	January 2025 – 2025
Parliamentary Private Secretary	Shivani Raja	November 2024 – present
Shadow Minister	The Baroness Stedman-Scott	November 2024 – June 2026
Shadow Minister	The Baroness Cash	June 2026 – present

=== Foreign relations ===
Foreign, Commonwealth and Development Office
Shadow Secretary of State for Foreign, Commonwealth and Development Affairs	**Priti Patel**	November 2024 – August 2026
Shadow Secretary of State for Foreign, Commonwealth and Development Affairs	**Tom Tugendhat**	August 2026 – present
Shadow Minister of State	Wendy Morton	November 2024 – present
Shadow Minister of State	Andrew Rosindell	November 2024 – January 2026
Shadow Minister of State	Alicia Kearns (also with Home Office)	September 2026 – present
Shadow Minister	The Lord Callanan	September 2024 – present
Shadow Minister	The Earl of Courtown	June 2026 – present
Shadow Parliamentary Under-Secretary of State	Alec Shelbrooke	July 2025 – November 2025
Shadow Parliamentary Under-Secretary of State	David Reed	September 2026 – present
Shadow Parliamentary Under-Secretary of State	Lincoln Jopp	September 2026 – present
Parliamentary Private Secretary	Lincoln Jopp	November 2024 – September 2026

Defence
Shadow Secretary of State for Defence	**James Cartlidge**	July 2024 – present
Shadow Minister	Mark Francois	November 2024 – present
Shadow Minister	Stuart Anderson	September 2026 – present
Shadow Parliamentary Under-Secretary of State	Ben Obese-Jecty	September 2026 – present
Shadow Parliamentary Under-Secretary of State	David Reed	September 2026 – present
Parliamentary Private Secretary	David Reed	November 2024 – September 2026
Shadow Minister	The Baroness Goldie	September 2024 – present
Shadow Minister	The Earl of Minto	September 2024 – April 2026, June 2026 – present

=== Law and order ===
Home Office
Shadow Home Secretary	**Chris Philp**	November 2024 – present
Shadow Minister	Matt Vickers	July 2024 – present
Shadow Minister	Alicia Kearns (also with FCDO)	November 2024 – present
Parliamentary Private Secretary	Sarah Bool	November 2024 – September 2026
Shadow Parliamentary Under-Secretary of State	Sarah Bool	September 2026 – present
Shadow Parliamentary Under-Secretary of State	Blake Stephenson	September 2026 – present
Shadow Minister	The Lord Murray of Blidworth	November 2024 – January 2025
Shadow Minister	The Lord Cameron of Lochiel	June 2026 – present
Shadow Minister	The Lord Davies of Gower	November 2024 – present

Justice
Shadow Secretary of State for Justice; Shadow Lord Chancellor	**Robert Jenrick**	November 2024 – January 2026
Shadow Secretary of State for Justice; Shadow Lord Chancellor	**Nick Timothy**	January 2026 – present
Shadow Minister of State	Kieran Mullan	November 2024 – present
Parliamentary Private Secretary	Jack Rankin	November 2024 – September 2026
Shadow Parliamentary Under-Secretary of State	Sarah Bool	September 2026 – present
Shadow Minister	The Lord Keen of Ellie	September 2024 – present

Attorney General's Office
Shadow Attorney General for England and Wales; Shadow Advocate General for Northern Ireland	The Lord Wolfson of Tredegar	November 2024 – present
Shadow Advocate General for Scotland	The Lord Keen of Ellie	November 2024 – present
Shadow Solicitor General	Helen Grant	November 2024 – September 2026
Shadow Solicitor General	Jerome Mayhew	September 2026 – present
Parliamentary Private Secretary	Sarah Bool	November 2024 – September 2026

=== Economy ===
Treasury
Shadow Chancellor of the Exchequer	**Mel Stride**	November 2024 – August 2026
Shadow Chancellor of the Exchequer	**Andrew Griffith**	August 2026 – present
Shadow Chief Secretary to the Treasury	**Richard Fuller**	November 2024 – present
Shadow Paymaster General and Minister for the Taxpayer	Harriett Baldwin	September 2026 – present
Shadow Financial Secretary to the Treasury	Gareth Davies	November 2024 – January 2026, August 2026 – present
Shadow Exchequer Secretary to the Treasury	James Wild	November 2024 – September 2026
Shadow Exchequer Secretary to the Treasury	John Cooper	September 2026 – present
Shadow Economic Secretary to the Treasury	Mark Garnier	November 2024 – present
Parliamentary Private Secretary	Blake Stephenson	November 2024 – September 2026
Shadow Pensions Minister	Peter Bedford	September 2026 – present
Shadow Minister	The Baroness Neville-Rolfe	November 2024 – present
Shadow Minister	The Lord Altrincham	September 2024 – April 2026, June 2026 – present

Business and Trade to August 2026, Department for Business, Innovation, Science and Trade from August 2026
Shadow Secretary of State for Business and Trade	**Andrew Griffith**	November 2024 – August 2026
Shadow Secretary of State for Business and Trade	**Claire Coutinho** (on maternity leave till January 2027)	August 2026 – present
Shadow Secretary of State for Business and Trade	**Julia Lopez** (acting)	August 2026 – present
Shadow Minister of State	Harriett Baldwin	November 2024 – August 2026
Shadow Minister of State	Julia Lopez	August 2026 – present
Shadow Minister of State	Mark Garnier	September 2026 – present
Shadow Minister for London	Gareth Bacon	July 2024 – August 2026
Shadow Parliamentary Under Secretary of State	Greg Smith	July 2024 – July 2025
Shadow Parliamentary Under Secretary of State	Gareth Davies	July 2025 – September 2026
Shadow Parliamentary Under Secretary of State	Bradley Thomas	September 2026 – present
Shadow Parliamentary Under Secretary of State	Peter Fortune	September 2026 – present
Parliamentary Private Secretary	Alison Griffiths	November 2024 – August 2026
Shadow Minister	The Lord Sharpe of Epsom	September 2024 – present
Shadow Minister	Lord Hunt of Wirral	January 2025 – present
Shadow Minister	The Lord Moynihan	September 2026 – present

Science, Innovation and Technology (department dissolved August 2026)
Shadow Secretary of State for Science, Innovation and Technology	**Alan Mak**	November 2024 – July 2025
Shadow Secretary of State for Science, Innovation and Technology	**Julia Lopez**	July 2025 – August 2026
Shadow Minister of State	Ben Spencer	July 2024 – September 2026
Parliamentary Private Secretary	Peter Fortune	November 2024 – September 2026
Shadow Minister	The Viscount Camrose	September 2024 – July 2026
Shadow Minister	The Lord Markham	September 2024 – July 2026

=== Social services ===
Education
Shadow Secretary of State for Education	**Laura Trott**	November 2024 – present
Shadow Minister	Neil O'Brien	November 2024 – July 2025
Shadow Minister	Saqib Bhatti	July 2025 – present
Parliamentary Private Secretary	Patrick Spencer	November 2024 – July 2025
Shadow Minister	The Baroness Barran	September 2024 – April 2026
Shadow Minister	The Baroness Cash	June 2026 – present
Shadow Parliamentary under Secretary of State	Rebecca Smith	September 2026 – present
Shadow Parliamentary under Secretary of State	Patrick Spencer	September 2026 – present

Health and Social Care
Shadow Secretary of State for Health and Social Care	**Edward Argar**	November 2024 – July 2025
Shadow Secretary of State for Health and Social Care	**Stuart Andrew**	July 2025 – August 2026
Shadow Secretary of State for Health and Social Care	**Damian Hinds**	August 2026 – present
Shadow Minister	Caroline Johnson	July 2024 – present
Shadow Minister	Luke Evans	November 2024 – September 2026
Parliamentary Private Secretary	Neil Shastri-Hurst	November 2024 – September 2026
Shadow Parliamentary Under Secretary of State	Neil Shastri-Hurst	September 2026 – present
Shadow Parliamentary Under Secretary of State	Greg Stafford	September 2026 – present
Shadow Minister	The Lord Kamall	September 2024 – present

Work and Pensions
Shadow Secretary of State for Work and Pensions	**Helen Whately**	November 2024 – present
Shadow Minister	Danny Kruger	November 2024 – September 2025
Shadow Minister	Andrew Snowden	September 2026 – present
Shadow Pensions Minister	Peter Bedford	September 2026 – present
Parliamentary Private Secretary	Peter Bedford	November 2024 – September 2026
Shadow Minister	The Viscount Younger of Leckie	September 2024 – April 2026
Shadow Minister	The Baroness Spielman	June 2026 – present
Shadow Minister	The Baroness Stedman-Scott	September 2024 – present
Shadow Parliamentary Under-Secretary of State	Mark Garnier	July 2025 – September 2026
Shadow Parliamentary Under-Secretary of State	Joe Robertson	September 2026 – present

=== Environment ===
Energy Security and Net Zero
Shadow Secretary of State for Energy Security and Net Zero	**Claire Coutinho**	July 2024 – August 2026
Shadow Secretary of State for Energy Security and Net Zero	**Andrew Bowie**	August 2026 – present
Shadow Minister (also Shadow Secretary of State for Scotland)	**Andrew Bowie**	November 2024 – August 2026
Shadow Minister (also Shadow Secretary of State for Scotland)	**Harriet Cross**	September 2026 – present
Parliamentary Private Secretary	Bradley Thomas	November 2024 – September 2026
Shadow Minister	The Lord Offord of Garvel	September 2024 – December 2025
Shadow Minister	The Lord Moynihan	June 2026 – September 2026
Shadow Minister	The Lord Blencathra	September 2026 – present
Shadow Minister of State	Luke Evans	September 2026 – present
Shadow Parliamentary Under-Secretary of State	Greg Smith	July 2025 – September 2026
Shadow Parliamentary Under-Secretary of State	Ashley Fox	September 2026 – present

Environment, Food and Rural Affairs
Shadow Secretary of State for Environment, Food and Rural Affairs	**Victoria Atkins**	November 2024 – present
Shadow Minister of State	Robbie Moore	July 2024 – present
Shadow Minister of State	Neil Hudson	November 2024 – present
Parliamentary Private Secretary	Aphra Brandreth	November 2024 – September 2026
Shadow Parliamentary Under-Secretary of State	Aphra Brandreth	September 2026 – present
Shadow Minister	The Lord Roborough	September 2024 – April 2026, June 2026 – present
Shadow Minister	The Lord Blencathra	September 2024 – present

=== Culture ===
Culture, Media and Sport to August 2026, Digital, Culture, Media and Sport from August 2026
Shadow Secretary of State for Culture, Media and Sport	**Stuart Andrew**	November 2024 – July 2025
Shadow Secretary of State for Culture, Media and Sport	**Nigel Huddleston**	July 2025 – August 2026
Shadow Secretary of State for Culture, Media and Sport	**Rebecca Paul**	August 2026 – present
Shadow Minister	Saqib Bhatti	November 2024 – July 2025
Shadow Minister	Louie French	November 2024 – present
Shadow Minister	James Wild	September 2026 – present
Parliamentary Private Secretary	Joe Robertson	November 2024 – September 2026
Shadow Minister	The Lord Parkinson of Whitley Bay	September 2024 – present
Shadow Minister	The Lord Moynihan	September 2026 – present

=== Transport ===
Transport
Shadow Secretary of State for Transport	**Gareth Bacon**	November 2024 – July 2025
Shadow Secretary of State for Transport	**Richard Holden**	July 2025 – present
Shadow Minister of State	Jerome Mayhew	November 2024 – August 2026
Shadow Minister of State	Greg Smith	August 2026 – present
Shadow Minister	The Lord Moylan	September 2024 – present
Shadow Parliamentary Under-Secretary of State	Greg Smith	July 2025 – August 2026
Shadow Parliamentary Under-Secretary of State	Alison Griffiths	August 2026 – present

=== Devolved and local government ===
Housing, Communities and Local Government
Shadow Secretary of State for Housing, Communities and Local Government	**Kevin Hollinrake**	November 2024 – July 2025
Shadow Secretary of State for Housing, Communities and Local Government	**James Cleverly**	July 2025 – August 2026
Shadow Secretary of State for Housing, Communities and Local Government	**Katie Lam**	August 2026 – present
Shadow Minister	David Simmonds	November 2024 – present
Shadow Minister	Paul Holmes	November 2024 – August 2026
Shadow Parliamentary Under-Secretary of State	Lewis Cocking	August 2026 – present
Parliamentary Private Secretary	Lewis Cocking	November 2024 – August 2026
Shadow Minister	The Lord Jamieson	November 2024 – present
Shadow Minister	The Baroness Scott of Bybrook	November 2024 – June 2026
Shadow Minister	The Baroness O'Neill of Bexley	June 2026 – present
Shadow Minister for Housing and Planning	Gareth Bacon	July 2025 – present

Northern Ireland
Shadow Secretary of State for Northern Ireland	**Alex Burghart**	July 2024 – present
Parliamentary Private Secretary	Charlie Dewhirst	November 2024 – August 2026
Shadow Parliamentary Under-Secretary of State	Charlie Dewhirst	August 2026 – present
Shadow Minister	The Lord Caine	September 2024 – present

Scotland
Shadow Secretary of State for Scotland (also Shadow Minister for Energy Security and Net Zero)	**Andrew Bowie**	November 2024 – August 2026
Shadow Secretary of State for Scotland (also Shadow Minister for Energy Security and Net Zero)	**Harriet Cross**	August 2026 – present
Parliamentary Private Secretary	John Cooper	November 2024 – September 2026
Parliamentary Private Secretary	Douglas Lumsden	September 2026 – present
Shadow Minister	The Lord Cameron of Lochie	September 2024 – present

Wales
Shadow Secretary of State for Wales	**Mims Davies**	November 2024 – present
Shadow Minister	The Baroness Bloomfield of Hinton Waldrist	November 2024 – present

=== Parliament ===
House Leaders
Shadow Leader of the House of Commons	**Jesse Norman**	November 2024 – present
Shadow Deputy Leader of the House Of Commons	John Lamont	July 2025 – present
Shadow Leader of the House of Lords	**The Lord True**	July 2024 – present
Shadow Deputy Leader of the House of Lords	The Earl Howe	July 2024 – April 2026, June 2026 – present

House of Commons Whips
Opposition Chief Whip	**Rebecca Harris**	November 2024 – present
Opposition Deputy Chief Whip	Gagan Mohindra	November 2024 – present
Opposition Deputy Chief Whip	Joy Morrissey	November 2024 – August 2026
Opposition Deputy Chief Whip	Paul Holmes	September 2026 – present
Senior Opposition Whip	Mike Wood	November 2024 – August 2026
Senior Opposition Whip	Greg Smith	November 2024 – July 2025
Senior Opposition Whip	Paul Holmes	November 2024 – August 2026
Senior Opposition Whip	Alicia Kearns	November 2024 – present
Senior Opposition Whip	David Simmonds	November 2024 – present
Senior Opposition Whip	James Wild	November 2024 – August 2026
Senior Opposition Whip	Jerome Mayhew	November 2024 – August 2026
Senior Opposition Whip	Richard Holden	November 2024 – July 2025
Senior Opposition Whip	Greg Stafford	September 2026 – present
Senior Opposition Whip	Ashley Fox	September 2026 – present
Senior Opposition Whip	Rebecca Smith	September 2026 – present
Senior Opposition Whip	Lincoln Jopp	September 2026 – present
Senior Opposition Whip	David Reed	September 2026 – present
Junior Opposition Whip	Nick Timothy	November 2024 – January 2026
Junior Opposition Whip	Katie Lam	November 2024 – August 2026
Junior Opposition Whip	Harriet Cross	November 2024 – August 2026
Junior Opposition Whip	Ben Obese-Jecty	November 2024 – July 2025
Junior Opposition Whip	Rebecca Paul	November 2024 – September 2026
Junior Opposition Whip	Rebecca Smith	November 2024 – September 2026
Junior Opposition Whip	Greg Stafford	November 2024 – September 2026
Junior Opposition Whip	Ashley Fox	November 2024 – September 2026
Junior Opposition Whip	Andrew Snowden	November 2024 – September 2026
Junior Opposition Whip	David Reed	June 2025 – September 2026
Junior Opposition Whip	Charlie Dewhirst	September 2026 – present
Junior Opposition Whip	Blake Stephenson	September 2026 – present
Junior Opposition Whip	John Cooper	September 2026 – present
Junior Opposition Whip	Sarah Bool	September 2026 – present
Junior Opposition Whip	Bradley Thomas	September 2026 – present
Junior Opposition Whip	Alison Griffiths	September 2026 – present
Junior Opposition Whip	Aphra Brandreth	September 2026 – present
Junior Opposition Whip	Patrick Spencer	September 2026 – present
Junior Opposition Whip	Lewis Cocking	September 2026 – present
Junior Opposition Whip	Joe Robertson	September 2026 – present

House of Lords Whips
Opposition Chief Whip in the House of Lords	**Baroness Williams of Old Trafford**	July 2024 – present
Deputy Chief Whip in the House of Lords	The Earl of Courtown	September 2024 – April 2026
Deputy Chief Whip in the House of Lords	The Baroness Bybrook	June 2026 – present
Opposition Lords Whip	The Earl of Effingham	September 2024 – April 2026, June 2026 – present
Opposition Lords Whip	The Lord Sandhurst	September 2024 – April 2026
Opposition Lords Whip	The Baroness Bloomfield of Hinton Waldrist	September 2024 – present
Opposition Lords Whip	The Baroness Stedman-Scott	November 2024 – June 2026
Opposition Lords Whip	The Lord Jamieson	November 2024 – June 2026
Opposition Lords Whip	The Lord Evans of Rainow	June 2026 – present
Opposition Lords Whip	The Earl of Courtown	June 2026 – present
Opposition Lords Whip	The Lord Ashcombe of Boldre	June 2026 – present
Opposition Lords Whip	The Lord Reay of Reay	June 2026 – present

== Reshuffles and Changes ==
=== January 2025 ===
- 1 January 2025: Lord Hunt of Wirral appointed Shadow Minister for Business and Trade.
- 15 January 2025: Lord Murray of Blidworth no longer Shadow Minister in the Home Office.
- 22 January 2025: Claire Coutinho Shadow Secretary of State for Energy Security and Net Zero, Shadow Minister for Equalities goes on Maternity Leave, Saqib Bhatti covering her as Shadow Minister for Equalities.

=== June 2025 ===
- 2 June 2025: David Reed appointed Junior opposition Whip

=== July 2025 ===
- 22 July 2025

=== September 2025 ===
- 15 September 2025: Danny Kruger, the MP for East Wiltshire and the Shadow Minister for Work and Pensions, defects to Reform UK.

=== November 2025 ===
- 13 November 2025: Alec Shelbrooke no longer Shadow Parliamentary Under Secretary of state for Foreign Affairs

=== December 2025 ===
- 6 December 2025: Lord Offord of Garvel Shadow Minister for Energy Security and Net Zero defects to Reform UK

=== January 2026 ===
- 13 January 2026: Gareth Davies no longer Shadow Financial Secretary to the Treasury
- 15 January 2026: Robert Jenrick (Shadow Lord Chancellor) was sacked from the shadow cabinet and lost the Conservative whip after plotting to defect to Reform UK. replaced by Nick Timothy
- 18 January 2026: Andrew Rosindell (Shadow Minister for Foreign Affairs) defected to Reform UK

=== April 2026 ===
- 29 April 2026: All have left the Shadow Front Bench
- 29 April 2026: Earl of Minto Shadow Minister for Defence
- 29 April 2026: Lord Altrincham Shadow Minister to the Treasury
- 29 April 2026: Viscount Camrose Shadow Minister for Science, Innovation and Technology
- 29 April 2026: Baroness Barran Shadow Minister for Education
- 29 April 2026: Viscount Younger of Leckie Shadow Minister for Work and Pensions
- 29 April 2026: Lord Roborough Shadow Minister for Environment, Food and Rural Affairs
- 29 April 2026: Earl Howe Shadow Deputy Leader of the House of Lords
- 29 April 2026: Earl of Courtown Shadow Deputy Chief Whip in the House of Lords
- 29 April 2026: Earl of Effingham Opposition Whip
- 29 April 2026: Lord Sandhurst Opposition Whip

=== June 2026 ===
- 2 June 2026: Lord Altrincham reappointed Shadow Minister for the Treasury
- 2 June 2026: Earl of Effingham reappointed as an Opposition Whip
- 4 June 2026: Baroness Scott of Bybrook no longer Shadow Minister for Housing, Communities and Local Government
- 4 June 2026: Baroness Stedman-Scott no longer Shadow Minister for Equalities and an Opposition Whip
- 4 June 2026: Lord Jamieson no longer an Opposition Whip
- 4 June 2026: Lord Moynihan appointed Shadow Minister for Energy Security and Net Zero
- 5 June 2026: Lord Evans of Rainow appointed Shadow Opposition Whip
- 5 June 2026: Lord Cameron of Lochiel appointed Shadow Minister in the Home Office
- 5 June 2026: Baroness Cash appointed Shadow Minister for Education and Shadow Minister for Equalities
- 5 June 2026: Baroness Spielman appointed Shadow Minister for Work and Pensions
- 10 June 2026: Earl Howe reappointed Shadow Deputy Leader of the House of Lords
- 11 June 2026: Lord Roborough reappointed Shadow Minister for Environment,Food & Rural Affairs
- 15 June 2026: Earl of Courtown appointed Shadow Minister for Foreign Affairs and as a Shadow Opposition Whip
- 15 June 2026: Lord Ashcombe appointed as a Shadow Opposition Whip
- 17 June 2026: Earl of Minto reappointed Shadow Minister for Defence
- 22 June 2026: Lord Reay appointed as a Shadow Opposition Whip

=== July 2026 ===
- 22 July 2026 Lord Markham no longer Shadow Minister for Science and Innovation and Technology

=== August 2026 ===
- 31 August 2026

=== September 2026 ===
- 17 September 2026 Lord Moynihan appointed Shadow Minister in Business, Innovation, Science and Trade & Digital, Culture, Media and Sport
- 17 September 2026 Lord Blencathra replaces Lord Moynihan as Shadow Minister for Energy Security and Net Zero

== See also ==
- Shadow Cabinet of Kemi Badenoch
- List of United Kingdom Conservative MPs (2024–present)
