= List of United Kingdom Conservative MPs (2024–present) =

121 Conservative Party members of Parliament (MPs) out of the 650 constituencies were elected to the House of Commons at the 4 July 2024 general election, the lowest number in its history. Party leader Kemi Badenoch is shown in bold.

The Conservative Party currently has 117 MPs.

== Summary ==
- 26 of the 121 Conservative MPs were newly elected to Parliament
- Leicester East (Shivani Raja) was the only Conservative gain in the 2024 general election (from Labour)
- The average winning margin in Conservative-won seats was 8.5%, compared with 18.9% for Labour seats.
- 39 of the 121 Conservative seats (~32%) were won with a majority of under 5%.
- 76 of the 121 Conservative seats (~63%) were won with a majority of under 10%.

== List of Conservative MPs elected in the 2024 general election by majority ==
| Constituency | Name | Majority (vote) | Majority (%) | Notes |
|---|---|---|---|---|
| Aberdeen South | Douglas Lumsden | 6,050 | 20.94 | Elected in a June 2026 by-election |
| Aldridge-Brownhills | Wendy Morton | 4,231 | 10.3 | |
| Arundel and South Downs | Andrew Griffith | 12,134 | 22.2 | |
| Basildon and Billericay | Richard Holden | 20 | 0.04 | |
| Beaconsfield | Joy Morrissey | 5,455 | 11.4 | |
| Berwickshire, Roxburgh and Selkirk | John Lamont | 6,599 | 14.1 | |
| Beverley and Holderness | Graham Stuart | 124 | 0.3 | |
| Bexhill and Battle | Kieran Mullan | 2,657 | 5.6 | |
| Bognor Regis and Littlehampton | Alison Griffiths | 1,765 | 3.7 | |
| Braintree | James Cleverly | 3,670 | 7.5 | |
| Brentwood and Ongar | Alex Burghart | 5,980 | 12.4 | |
| Bridgwater | Ashley Fox | 1,349 | 3.4 | |
| Bridlington and The Wolds | Charlie Dewhirst | 3,125 | 7.3 | |
| Brigg and Immingham | Martin Vickers | 3,243 | 7.6 | |
| Broadland and Fakenham | Jerome Mayhew | 719 | 1.5 | |
| Bromley and Biggin Hill | Peter Fortune | 302 | 0.6 | |
| Bromsgrove | Bradley Thomas | 3,016 | 6.0 | |
| Broxbourne | Lewis Cocking | 2,858 | 6.6 | |
| Castle Point | Rebecca Harris | 3,251 | 8.0 | |
| Central Devon | Mel Stride | 61 | 0.1 | |
| Central Suffolk and North Ipswich | Patrick Spencer | 4,290 | 9.2 | Suspended in May 2025, whip returned July 2026 |
| Chester South and Eddisbury | Aphra Brandreth | 3,057 | 5.8 | |
| Chingford and Woodford Green | Iain Duncan Smith | 4,758 | 9.8 | |
| Christchurch | Christopher Chope | 7,455 | 15.8 | |
| Croydon South | Chris Philp | 2,313 | 4.7 | |
| Daventry | Stuart Andrew | 3,012 | 5.7 | |
| Droitwich and Evesham | Nigel Huddleston | 8,995 | 18.1 | |
| Dumfries and Galloway | John Cooper | 930 | 2.1 | |
| Dumfriesshire, Clydesdale and Tweeddale | David Mundell | 4,242 | 9.6 | |
| East Grinstead and Uckfield | Mims Davies | 8,480 | 16.8 | |
| East Hampshire | Damian Hinds | 1,275 | 2.5 | |
| East Surrey | Claire Coutinho | 7,450 | 15.2 | |
| East Wiltshire | Danny Kruger | 4,716 | 10.0 | Defected to Reform UK in September 2025 |
| Epping Forest | Neil Hudson | 5,682 | 13.6 | |
| Exmouth and Exeter East | David Reed | 121 | 0.2 | |
| Fareham and Waterlooville | Suella Braverman | 6,079 | 12.1 | Defected to Reform UK in January 2026 |
| Farnham and Bordon | Greg Stafford | 1,349 | 2.5 | |
| Faversham and Mid Kent | Helen Whately | 1,469 | 3.2 | |
| Fylde | Andrew Snowden | 561 | 1.2 | |
| Gainsborough | Edward Leigh | 3,532 | 7.6 | |
| Godalming and Ash | Jeremy Hunt | 891 | 1.6 | |
| Goole and Pocklington | David Davis | 3,572 | 7.2 | |
| Gordon and Buchan | Harriet Cross | 878 | 2.0 | |
| Gosport | Caroline Dinenage | 6,066 | 13.7 | |
| Grantham and Bourne | Gareth Davies | 4,496 | 9.7 | |
| Hamble Valley | Paul Holmes | 4,809 | 8.9 | |
| Harborough, Oadby and Wigston | Neil O'Brien | 2,378 | 4.7 | |
| Harrow East | Bob Blackman | 11,680 | 24.4 | |
| Harwich and North Essex | Bernard Jenkin | 1,162 | 2.4 | |
| Havant | Alan Mak | 92 | 0.2 | |
| Hereford and South Herefordshire | Jesse Norman | 1,279 | 2.8 | |
| Herne Bay and Sandwich | Roger Gale | 2,499 | 5.1 | |
| Hertsmere | Oliver Dowden | 7,992 | 16.7 | |
| Hinckley and Bosworth | Luke Evans | 5,408 | 11.3 | |
| Hornchurch and Upminster | Julia Lopez | 1,943 | 4.1 | |
| Huntingdon | Ben Obese-Jecty | 1,499 | 2.9 | |
| Isle of Wight East | Joe Robertson | 3,323 | 9.8 | |
| Keighley and Ilkley | Robbie Moore | 1,625 | 3.6 | |
| Kenilworth and Southam | Jeremy Wright | 6,574 | 12.4 | |
| Kingswinford and South Staffordshire | Mike Wood | 6,303 | 14.0 | |
| Leicester East | Shivani Raja | 4,426 | 9.5 | |
| Louth and Horncastle | Victoria Atkins | 5,506 | 11.8 | |
| Maidstone and Malling | Helen Grant | 1,674 | 3.6 | |
| Maldon | John Whittingdale | 6,906 | 13.9 | |
| Melton and Syston | Edward Argar | 5,396 | 11.7 | |
| Meriden and Solihull East | Saqib Bhatti | 4,584 | 10.4 | |
| Mid Bedfordshire | Blake Stephenson | 1,321 | 2.7 | |
| Mid Buckinghamshire | Greg Smith | 5,872 | 10.8 | |
| Mid Leicestershire | Peter Bedford | 2,201 | 4.6 | |
| Mid Norfolk | George Freeman | 3,054 | 6.7 | |
| New Forest East | Julian Lewis | 8,495 | 18.8 | |
| New Forest West | Desmond Swayne | 5,600 | 12.1 | |
| Newark | Robert Jenrick | 3,572 | 6.7 | Suspended and expelled from the Conservative Party, and defected to Reform UK in January 2026 |
| North Bedfordshire | Richard Fuller | 5,414 | 10.5 | |
| North Cotswolds | Geoffrey Clifton-Brown | 3,357 | 6.7 | |
| North Dorset | Simon Hoare | 1,589 | 3.1 | |
| North East Cambridgeshire | Steve Barclay | 7,189 | 18.4 | |
| North West Essex | **Kemi Badenoch** | 2,610 | 4.8 | Leader of the Opposition |
| North West Hampshire | Kit Malthouse | 3,288 | 6.5 | |
| North West Norfolk | James Wild | 4,954 | 11.1 | |
| Old Bexley and Sidcup | Louie French | 3,548 | 7.4 | |
| Orpington | Gareth Bacon | 5,118 | 11.1 | |
| Rayleigh and Wickford | Mark Francois | 5,621 | 11.7 | |
| Reigate | Rebecca Paul | 3,187 | 6.0 | |
| Richmond and Northallerton | Rishi Sunak | 12,185 | 25.1 | |
| Romford | Andrew Rosindell | 1,463 | 3.3 | Defected to Reform UK in January 2026 |
| Romsey and Southampton North | Caroline Nokes | 2,191 | 4.4 | |
| Ruislip, Northwood and Pinner | David Simmonds | 7,581 | 16.1 | |
| Runnymede and Weybridge | Ben Spencer | 7,627 | 15.8 | |
| Rutland and Stamford | Alicia Kearns | 10,394 | 21.4 | |
| Salisbury | John Glen | 3,807 | 7.6 | |
| Sevenoaks | Laura Trott | 5,440 | 10.9 | |
| Skipton and Ripon | Julian Smith | 1,650 | 3.1 | |
| Sleaford and North Hykeham | Caroline Johnson | 4,346 | 8.9 | |
| Solihull West and Shirley | Neil Shastri-Hurst | 4,620 | 9.8 | |
| South Holland and the Deepings | John Hayes | 6,856 | 14.9 | |
| South Leicestershire | Alberto Costa | 5,508 | 10.8 | |
| South Northamptonshire | Sarah Bool | 3,687 | 6.8 | |
| South Shropshire | Stuart Anderson | 1,624 | 3.1 | |
| South Suffolk | James Cartlidge | 3,047 | 6.3 | |
| South West Devon | Rebecca Smith | 2,112 | 4.0 | |
| South West Hertfordshire | Gagan Mohindra | 4,456 | 9.2 | |
| South West Wiltshire | Andrew Murrison | 3,243 | 7.0 | |
| Spelthorne | Lincoln Jopp | 1,590 | 3.4 | |
| Staffordshire Moorlands | Karen Bradley | 1,175 | 2.8 | |
| Stockton West | Matt Vickers | 2,139 | 4.4 | |
| Stone, Great Wyrley and Penkridge | Gavin Williamson | 5,466 | 12.8 | |
| Sussex Weald | Nus Ghani | 6,842 | 13.9 | |
| Sutton Coldfield | Andrew Mitchell | 2,543 | 5.3 | |
| Tatton | Esther McVey | 1,136 | 2.2 | |
| The Wrekin | Mark Pritchard | 883 | 1.8 | |
| Thirsk and Malton | Kevin Hollinrake | 7,550 | 15.1 | |
| Tonbridge | Tom Tugendhat | 11,166 | 22.0 | |
| Torridge and Tavistock | Geoffrey Cox | 3,950 | 7.8 | |
| Weald of Kent | Katie Lam | 8,422 | 16.6 | |
| West Aberdeenshire and Kincardine | Andrew Bowie | 3,441 | 7.0 | |
| West Suffolk | Nick Timothy | 3,247 | 7.1 | |
| West Worcestershire | Harriett Baldwin | 6,547 | 12.0 | |
| Wetherby and Easingwold | Alec Shelbrooke | 4,846 | 9.3 | |
| Windsor | Jack Rankin | 6,457 | 14.3 | |
| Witham | Priti Patel | 5,145 | 10.2 | |
| Wyre Forest | Mark Garnier | 812 | 1.8 | |

== See also ==
- Opposition frontbench of Kemi Badenoch (November 2024 to present)
- Opposition frontbench of Rishi Sunak (July 2024 to November 2024)
- 1922 Committee
- 2024 Conservative Party leadership election
