= Opposition frontbench of Rishi Sunak =

The frontbench of His Majesty's Loyal Opposition in the Parliament of the United Kingdom consists of the Shadow cabinet and other shadow ministers of the political party which served as His Majesty's Official Opposition was the Conservative Party from 5 July 2024 to 2 November 2024. The Leader of the Opposition was Rishi Sunak.

In July 2024, Sunak and interim opposition whip Stuart Andrew appointed a new Conservative front bench, accepting the resignations of David Cameron, the former foreign secretary, and Richard Holden, the former party chairman. The opposition frontbench was succeeded by that of Kemi Badenoch, who was elected leader of the Conservative Party in the 2024 leadership election.

== List of shadow ministers ==
Sits in the House of Commons
Sits in the House of Lords
Privy Counsellor
Shadow Cabinet full members **in bold**
Shadow Cabinet attendees **in bold italics**

== Leader of the Opposition and Cabinet Office ==
Office of the Leader of the Opposition
Leader of the Opposition Leader of the Conservative Party; Shadow First Lord of the Treasury; Shadow Minister for the Civil Service	**Rishi Sunak**	July 2024 – November 2024
Deputy Leader of the Opposition Shadow Chancellor of the Duchy of Lancaster	**Oliver Dowden**	July 2024 – November 2024

Cabinet Office
Shadow Paymaster General	John Glen	July 2024 – November 2024
Shadow Minister for the Cabinet Office	Baroness Neville-Rolfe	September 2024 – November 2024

Equalities Office
Shadow Minister for Women and Equalities	**Mims Davies**	July 2024 – November 2024
Shadow Minister	Baroness Barran	September 2024 – November 2024

== Foreign relations ==
Foreign, Commonwealth and Development Affairs
Shadow Secretary of State for Foreign, Commonwealth and Development Affairs	**Andrew Mitchell**	July 2024 – November 2024
Shadow Minister for Development	Harriett Baldwin	July 2024 – November 2024
Shadow Minister for Foreign Affairs	Paul Holmes (also with Northern Ireland Office and Whips Office)	July 2024 – November 2024
Shadow Minister for Foreign Affairs	Alicia Kearns	July 2024 – November 2024
Shadow Minister for Foreign Affairs	Lord Callanan	September 2024 – November 2024

Defence
Shadow Secretary of State for Defence	**James Cartlidge**	July 2024 – November 2024
Shadow Minister for Veterans	**Andrew Bowie** (also with Energy)	July 2024 – November 2024
Shadow Minister of State	Stuart Anderson (also with Whips Office)	July 2024 – November 2024
Shadow Parliamentary Under Secretary of State	Danny Kruger	July 2024 – November 2024
Shadow Minister of State	Baroness Goldie	September 2024 – November 2024
Shadow Minister of State	The Earl of Minto	September 2024 – November 2024

== Law and order ==
Home Department
Shadow Secretary of State for the Home Department	**James Cleverly**	July 2024 – November 2024
Shadow Minister for Security	**Tom Tugendhat**	July 2024 – November 2024
Shadow Minister of State for Crime, Policing and Fire	Matt Vickers	July 2024 – November 2024
Shadow Minister	Lord Sharpe of Epsom	September 2024 – November 2024

Justice
Shadow Secretary of State for Justice Shadow Lord Chancellor	**Edward Argar**	July 2024 – November 2024
Shadow Minister of State	Gareth Bacon (also with Business and Trade)	July 2024 – November 2024
Shadow Minister	Lord Keen of Elie	September 2024 – November 2024
Shadow Minister	Lord Wolfson of Tredegar	September 2024 – November 2024

Law Officers
Shadow Attorney General for England and Wales Shadow Advocate General for Northern Ireland	**Jeremy Wright**	July 2024 – November 2024
Shadow Solicitor General	Alberto Costa	July 2024 – November 2024

== Economy ==
Treasury
Shadow Chancellor of the Exchequer	**Jeremy Hunt**	July 2024 – November 2024
Shadow Chief Secretary to the Treasury	**Laura Trott**	July 2024 – November 2024
Shadow Financial Secretary to the Treasury	Nigel Huddleston	July 2024 – November 2024
Shadow Exchequer Secretary to the Treasury	Gareth Davies	July 2024 – November 2024
Shadow Economic Secretary to the Treasury	Alan Mak	July 2024 – November 2024
Shadow Minister	Baroness Vere of Norbiton	September 2024 – November 2024
Shadow Minister	The Lord Altrincham	September 2024 – November 2024

Business and Trade
Shadow Secretary of State for Business and Trade	**Kevin Hollinrake**	July 2024 – November 2024
Shadow Minister for London	Gareth Bacon (also with Justice)	July 2024 – November 2024
Shadow Minister of State	Mike Wood (also with Whips Office)	July 2024 – November 2024
Shadow Parliamentary Under Secretary of State	Jerome Mayhew	July 2024 – November 2024
Shadow Parliamentary Under Secretary of State	Greg Smith (also with Transport)	July 2024 – November 2024
Shadow Minister	Lord Johnson of Lainston	September 2024 – November 2024

Science, Innovation and Technology
Shadow Secretary of State for Science, Innovation and Technology	**Andrew Griffith**	July 2024 – November 2024
Shadow Minister of State	Saqib Bhatti (also with Health and Social Care)	July 2024 – November 2024
Shadow Minister	The Viscount Camrose	September 2024 – November 2024
Shadow Minister	Lord Markham	September 2024 – November 2024

== Social services ==
Education
Shadow Secretary of State for Education	**Damian Hinds**	July 2024 – November 2024
Shadow Minister of State	Gagan Mohindra	July 2024 – November 2024
Shadow Parliamentary Under Secretary of State	James Wild	July 2024 – November 2024
Shadow Minister	Baroness Barran	September 2024 – November 2024

Health and Social Care
Shadow Secretary of State for Health and Social Care	**Victoria Atkins**	July 2024 – November 2024
Shadow Minister of State	John Whittingdale	July 2024 – November 2024
Shadow Minister of State	Saqib Bhatti (also with Science, Innovation and Technology)	July 2024 – November 2024
Shadow Minister of State	Ben Spencer	July 2024 – November 2024
Shadow Parliamentary Under Secretary of State	Caroline Johnson	July 2024 – November 2024
Minister of State	Lord Kamall	September 2024 – November 2024

Work and Pensions
Shadow Secretary of State for Work and Pensions	**Mel Stride**	July 2024 – November 2024
Shadow Minister	The Viscount Younger of Leckie	September 2024 – November 2024
Shadow Minister	Baroness Stedman-Scott	September 2024 – November 2024

== Environment ==
Energy Security and Net Zero
Shadow Secretary of State for Climate Change and Net Zero	**Claire Coutinho**	July 2024 – November 2024
Shadow Minister of State	**Andrew Bowie** (also with Defence)	July 2024 – November 2024
Shadow Minister of State	Joy Morrissey (also with Whips Office)	July 2024 – November 2024
Shadow Parliamentary Under Secretary of State	Mark Garnier	July 2024 – November 2024
Shadow Minister	Lord Offord of Garvel	September 2024 – November 2024

Environment, Food and Rural Affairs
Shadow Secretary of State for Environment, Food and Rural Affairs	**Steve Barclay**	July 2024 – November 2024
Shadow Minister of State	Robbie Moore	July 2024 – November 2024
Shadow Minister	The Lord Roborough	September 2024 – November 2024
Shadow Minister	Lord Blencathra	September 2024 – November 2024

== Culture ==
Culture, Media and Sport
Shadow Secretary of State for Culture, Media and Sport	**Julia Lopez**	July 2024 – November 2024
Shadow Parliamentary Under Secretary of State	Luke Evans (also with Whips Office)	July 2024 – November 2024
Shadow Parliamentary Under Secretary of State	Louie French	July 2024 – November 2024
Shadow Minister	The Lord Parkinson of Whitley Bay	September 2024 – November 2024

== Transport ==
Transport
Shadow Secretary of State for Transport	**Helen Whately**	July 2024 – November 2024
Shadow Minister of State	Alec Shelbrooke	July 2024 – November 2024
Shadow Parliamentary Under Secretary of State	Kieran Mullan	July 2024 – November 2024
Shadow Parliamentary Under Secretary of State	Greg Smith (also with Business and Trade)	July 2024 – November 2024
Shadow Minister	Lord Moylan	September 2024 – November 2024

== Devolved and local government ==
Housing, Communities and Local Government
Shadow Secretary of State for Housing, Communities and Local Government	**Kemi Badenoch**	July 2024 – November 2024
Shadow Parliamentary Under Secretary of State	David Simmonds (also with Whips Office)	July 2024 – November 2024

Northern Ireland
Shadow Secretary of State for Northern Ireland	**Alex Burghart**	July 2024 – November 2024
Shadow Minister	Paul Holmes (also with Foreign Office and Whips Office)	July 2024 – November 2024
Shadow Minister	Lord Caine	September 2024 – November 2024

Scotland
Shadow Secretary of State for Scotland	**John Lamont**	July 2024 – November 2024
Shadow Minister	Lord Cameron of Lochiel	September 2024 – November 2024

Wales
Shadow Secretary of State for Wales	**Lord Davies of Gower**	July 2024 – November 2024

== Parliament ==
House Leaders
Shadow Leader of the House of Commons	**Chris Philp**	July 2024 – November 2024
Shadow Leader of the House of Lords	**The Lord True**	July 2024 – November 2024
Shadow Deputy Leader of the House of Lords	The Earl Howe	July 2024 – November 2024

House of Commons Whips
Opposition Chief Whip in the House of Commons	**Stuart Andrew**	July 2024 – November 2024
Opposition Whip	Paul Holmes (also with Foreign Office and Northern Ireland Office)	July 2024 – November 2024
Opposition Whip	David Simmonds (also with Housing, Communities and Local Government)	July 2024 – November 2024
Opposition Whip	Luke Evans (also with Culture, Media and Sport)	July 2024 – November 2024
Opposition Whip	Joy Morrissey (also with Energy and Net Zero)	July 2024 – November 2024
Opposition Whip	Mike Wood (also with Business and Trade)	July 2024 – November 2024

House of Lords Whips
Opposition Chief Whip in the House of Lords	**Baroness Williams of Old Trafford**	July 2024 – November 2024
Deputy Chief Whip in the House of Lords	The Earl Of Courtown	September 2024 – November 2024
Opposition Lords Whip	The Earl of Effingham	September 2024 – November 2024
Opposition Lords Whip	Lord Evans of Rainow	September 2024 – November 2024
Opposition Lords Whip	The Lord Sandhurst	September 2024 – November 2024
Opposition Lords Whip	Baroness Scott of Bybrook	September 2024 – November 2024
