= Exchequer Secretary to the Treasury =

Junior minister in the British Treasury

United Kingdom Exchequer Secretary to the Treasury
- Royal arms of His Majesty's Government

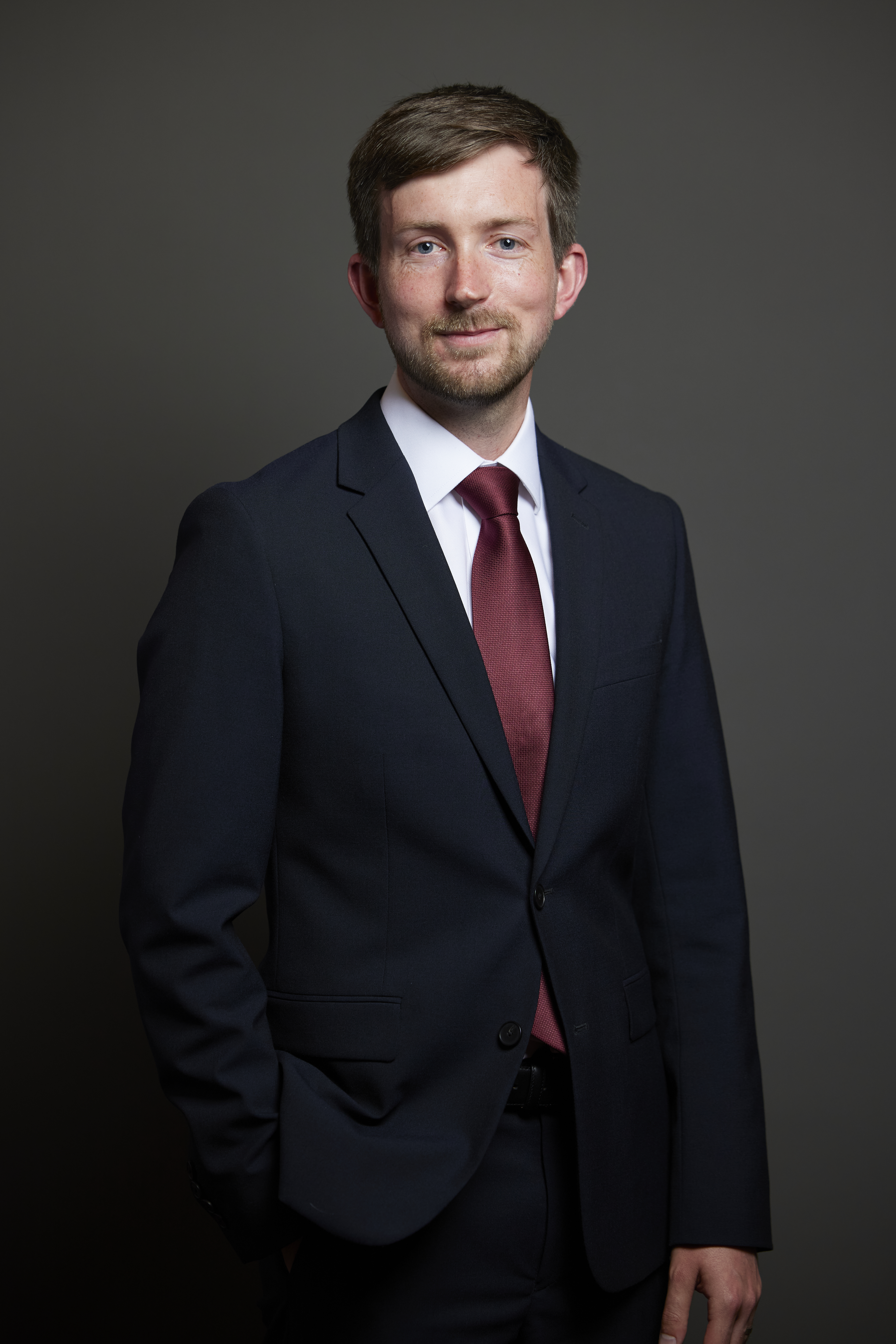
- Incumbent; Dan Tomlinson since 1 September 2025
- His Majesty's Treasury
- Reports to: First Lord of the Treasury; Chancellor of the Exchequer & Second Lord of the Treasury
- Nominator: Prime Minister
- Appointer: The King (on the advice of the prime minister)
- Term length: At His Majesty's pleasure
- Inaugural holder: Phillip Oppenheim
- Formation: 23 July 1996
- Website: Official website

The exchequer secretary to the Treasury is a junior ministerial post in His Majesty's Treasury, ranked below the First Lord of the Treasury, the chancellor of the Exchequer, the chief secretary to the Treasury, the paymaster general and the financial secretary to the Treasury, and alongside the economic secretary to the Treasury. It ranks at parliamentary secretary level and the holder does not attend Cabinet. The Exchequer Secretary to the Treasury is currently the Minister for Growth.

The first exchequer secretary was Phillip Oppenheim, who held the post from 23 July 1996 to 2 May 1997, when he lost his seat in the general election that brought Tony Blair to power.

Following a period of abeyance, the office was reinstated upon Gordon Brown's accession as prime minister in June 2007, when Angela Eagle was appointed exchequer secretary. The office again fell out of use in July 2016 when Theresa May became prime minister, before she reinstated it following the 2017 general election.

The position was held by Helen Whately, having been held by Kemi Badenoch from 2020 to 2021.

The minister is shadowed by the shadow exchequer secretary to the Treasury, who sits on the Official Opposition frontbench.

== Responsibilities ==
- Enterprise and productivity including small business taxation and support to the chancellor of the Exchequer on economic reform
- Competition and better regulation
- Science, innovation and skills policy, including implementation of the 10-year science and innovation strategy and the R&D tax credit
- Regional economic policy
- Urban regeneration and social exclusion including housing, planning and planning gain supplement;
- Environmental issues including taxation of transport, international Climate Change issues including global carbon trading and EU ETS, and Energy Issues
- Taxation of oil
- Excise duties and gambling, including excise fraud and law enforcement
- Public-private partnerships including Private Finance Initiative, and Partnerships UK
- Ministerial responsibility for the Office for National Statistics, the Royal Mint and Departmental Minister for HM Treasury Group
- Support to the Chief Secretary to the Treasury on public spending issues including long-term challenges in the run up to the Comprehensive Spending Review and selected Cabinet Committees
- Assist where necessary on European issues
- Working with the Financial Secretary to the Treasury on the Finance Bill

Responsibility for procurement policy and the former Office of Government Commerce was transferred to the Cabinet Office in 2011.

== List of exchequer secretaries ==
Key
Conservative Labour

Portrait	Name	Term of office		Party	Prime Minister	Chancellor	Ref.
	Phillip Oppenheim; MP for Amber Valley	23 July 1996	2 May 1997	Conservative	Major	Clarke	
Office not in use		1997–2007		N/A	Blair	Brown	
	Angela Eagle; MP for Wallasey	29 June 2007	9 June 2009	Labour	Brown	Darling	
	Kitty Ussher; MP for Burnley	9 June 2009	17 June 2009	Labour	Brown	Darling	
	Sarah McCarthy-Fry; MP for Portsmouth North	17 June 2009	11 May 2010	Labour	Brown	Darling	
	David Gauke; MP for South West Hertfordshire	13 May 2010	15 July 2014	Conservative	Cameron (Coalition)	Osborne	
	Priti Patel; MP for Witham	15 July 2014	11 May 2015	Conservative	Cameron (Coalition)	Osborne	
	Damian Hinds; MP for East Hampshire	12 May 2015	13 July 2016	Conservative	Cameron (II)	Osborne	
Office not in use		2016–2017		N/A	May (I)	Hammond	
	Andrew Jones; MP for Harrogate and Knaresborough	15 June 2017	8 January 2018	Conservative	May (II)	Hammond	
	Robert Jenrick; MP for Newark	9 January 2018	24 July 2019	Conservative	May (II)	Hammond	
	Simon Clarke; MP for Middlesbrough South and East Cleveland	27 July 2019	13 February 2020	Conservative	Johnson	Javid	
	Kemi Badenoch; MP for Saffron Walden	13 February 2020	16 September 2021	Conservative	Johnson	Sunak	
	Helen Whately; MP for Faversham and Mid Kent	16 September 2021	8 July 2022	Conservative	Johnson	Sunak	
	Alan Mak; MP for Havant	8 July 2022	7 September 2022	Conservative	Johnson	Zahawi	
	Felicity Buchan; MP for Kensington	8 September 2022	28 October 2022	Conservative	Truss	Kwarteng	
	Felicity Buchan; MP for Kensington	8 September 2022	28 October 2022	Conservative	Truss	Hunt	
	James Cartlidge; MP for South Suffolk	28 October 2022	21 April 2023	Conservative	Sunak	Hunt	
	Gareth Davies; MP for Grantham and Stamford	21 April 2023	5 July 2024	Conservative	Sunak	Hunt	
	James Murray; MP for Ealing North	9 July 2024	1 September 2025	Labour	Starmer	Reeves	
	Dan Tomlinson; MP for Chipping Barnet	1 September 2025	Incumbent	Labour	Starmer	Reeves	
	Dan Tomlinson; MP for Chipping Barnet	1 September 2025	Incumbent	Labour	Burnham	Healey	

== See also ==
- Secretary to the Treasury
