= James Murray (British politician, born 1983) =

British politician (born 1983)

The Right Honourable James Murray MP
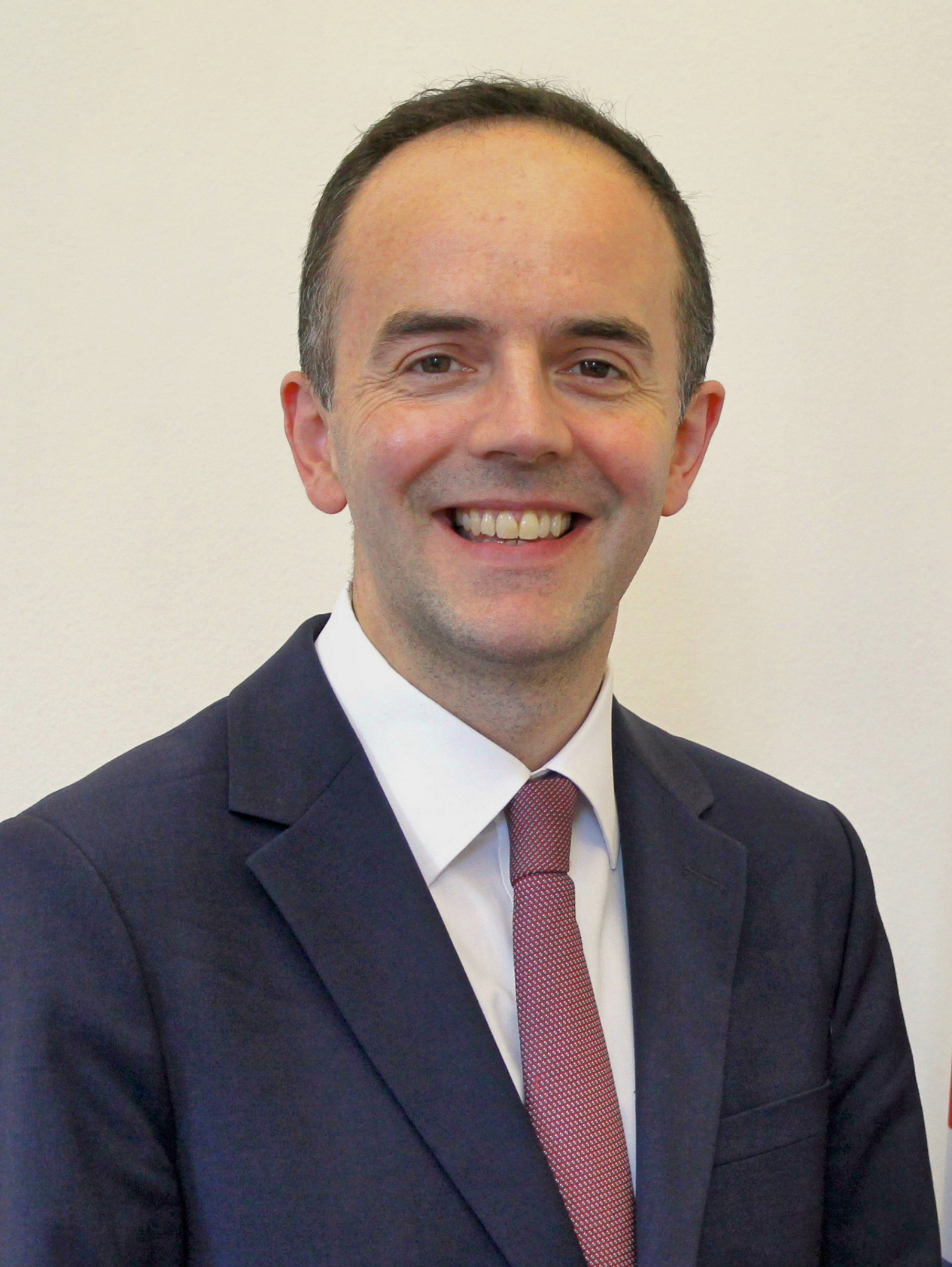
- Official portrait, 2024

Paymaster General
- Incumbent
- Assumed office 21 July 2026
- Prime Minister: Andy Burnham
- Preceded by: Nick Thomas-Symonds

Financial Secretary to the Treasury
- Incumbent
- Assumed office 21 July 2026
- Prime Minister: Andy Burnham
- Preceded by: The Lord Livermore

Secretary of State for Health and Social Care
- In office 14 May 2026 – 20 July 2026
- Prime Minister: Keir Starmer
- Preceded by: Wes Streeting
- Succeeded by: Yvette Cooper

Chief Secretary to the Treasury
- In office 1 September 2025 – 14 May 2026
- Prime Minister: Keir Starmer
- Preceded by: Darren Jones
- Succeeded by: Lucy Rigby

Exchequer Secretary to the Treasury
- In office 9 July 2024 – 1 September 2025
- Prime Minister: Keir Starmer
- Preceded by: Gareth Davies
- Succeeded by: Dan Tomlinson

Member of Parliament for Ealing North
- Incumbent
- Assumed office 12 December 2019
- Preceded by: Stephen Pound
- Majority: 12,489 (28.9%)
Shadow portfolios
2020–2024	Financial Secretary
2020–2020	Whip

Deputy Mayor of London for Housing and Residential Development
- In office 14 April 2016 – 16 October 2019
- Mayor: Sadiq Khan
- Preceded by: Rick Blakeway
- Succeeded by: Tom Copley

Member of Islington Council for Barnsbury
- In office 6 May 2006 – 26 May 2016
- Succeeded by: Rowena Champion

Personal details
- Born: James Stewart Murray; 13 July 1983 (age 43) Hammersmith, London, England
- Party: Labour Co-op
- Education: Wadham College, Oxford (BA)
- Website: jamesmurray.org

James Stewart Murray (born 13 July 1983) is a British politician who has served as Financial Secretary to the Treasury and Paymaster General since 2026. A member of the Labour and Cooperative party, he has been the Member of Parliament (MP) for Ealing North since 2019. He served as the Secretary of State for Health and Social Care from May to July 2026, following the resignation of Wes Streeting. He previously served as Chief Secretary to the Treasury from September 2025 until May 2026, and as the Exchequer Secretary to the Treasury from July 2024 until September 2025. He served as Deputy Mayor of London for Housing from 2016 to 2019.

== Early life and education ==
James Murray was born on 13 July 1983 in Hammersmith. His grandmother was an active Labour supporter. He grew up in West Ealing and was privately educated at St Paul's School, before studying PPE at Wadham College, Oxford. Murray graduated with a first-class BA degree in 2004.

== Early political career ==
Murray served as a councillor in Islington from 2006 to 2016, representing Barnsbury ward. He was the borough's Executive Member for Housing and Development from 2010 to 2016.

He advised Sadiq Khan during his successful selection and election campaigns to become Mayor of London, and was appointed by Khan as London's Deputy Mayor for Housing in 2016.

As Deputy Mayor, Murray championed a new 'fast track' approach to affordable housing requirements for development in London. The new approach encouraged developers to offer more affordable homes upfront in exchange for dropping complex viability negotiations. It boosted affordable housing provision and won backing from many in the property industry for speeding up the process.

Murray also oversaw the Mayor's £4.8bn affordable homes investment programme. He developed the first-ever City Hall initiative dedicated to building council homes, Building Council Homes for Londoners, which raised council homebuilding to its highest level in 34 years.

== Parliamentary career ==
At the 2019 general election, Murray was elected to Parliament as MP for Ealing North with 56.5% of the vote and a majority of 12,269. He gave his maiden speech in January 2020. He became a member of the Health and Social Care Committee in March 2020 and was appointed to the Opposition Whips' Office in April 2020.

On 16 October 2020, he was appointed Shadow Financial Secretary to the Treasury, following the resignation of Dan Carden the previous day.

As Shadow Financial Secretary to the Treasury, he led for the Opposition on legislation including several finance bills, and bills affecting stamp duty and National Insurance Contributions.

Murray was re-elected as MP for Ealing North at the 2024 general election with a decreased vote share of 47.8% and an increased majority of 12,489. Prime Minister Keir Starmer appointed Murray Exchequer Secretary to the Treasury in his government in the early days of his premiership. In the 2025 British cabinet reshuffle, Murray replaced Darren Jones as Chief Secretary to the Treasury. He was subsequently appointed to the Privy Council.

On 14 May 2026, following the resignation of Wes Streeting, Murray was appointed Secretary of State for Health and Social Care by Prime Minister Keir Starmer. As Health Secretary he brokered a deal to end to a long-running period of industrial action by resident doctors.

In July 2026, he was replaced as Health Secretary by Yvette Cooper. Murray joined the Burnham ministry as Financial Secretary to the Treasury and Paymaster General where his responsibilities include leading on fiscal devolution.

== Views ==
Following the Supreme Court's 2025 ruling on restricting single-sex spaces, Murray supported the ruling stating “it is important that we ensure dignity and respect for all. Trans people should have access to services they need but in keeping with the ruling." As of June 2026, Murray has stated that he no longer considers transgender women to be women, citing the Supreme Court's 2026 judgment to restrict single-sex spaces to those assigned a specific sex at birth.

== Personal life ==
Murray lives in West Ealing with his husband Tom Griffiths. In the late 2000s, Murray was diagnosed with Myasthenia gravis. He received treatment at the National Hospital for Neurology and Neurosurgery, Queen Square, and is now symptom-free.

Parliament of the United Kingdom
Preceded by Stephen Pound	Member of Parliament for Ealing North; 2019–present	Incumbent
Political offices
Preceded by Darren Jones	Chief Secretary to the Treasury; 2025–2026	Succeeded by Lucy Rigby
Preceded by Wes Streeting	Secretary of State for Health and Social Care; 2026	Succeeded by Yvette Cooper
