= Phillip Oppenheim =

British businessman and politician

The Honourable Phillip Oppenheim
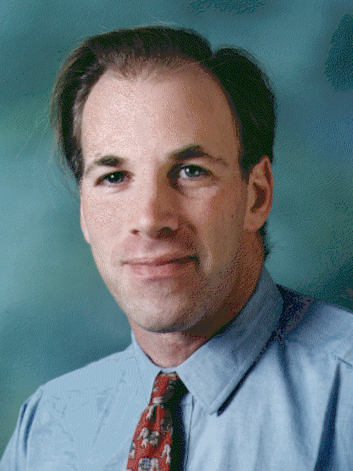
- Official portrait, c. 1996–97

Exchequer Secretary to the Treasury
- In office 23 July 1996 – 2 May 1997
- Prime Minister: John Major
- Preceded by: Office established
- Succeeded by: Angela Eagle (2007)

Member of Parliament for Amber Valley
- In office 9 June 1983 – 8 April 1997
- Preceded by: Constituency established
- Succeeded by: Judy Mallaber

Personal details
- Born: Phillip Anthony Charles Lawrence Oppenheim; 20 March 1956 (age 70) Lambeth, London, England
- Party: Conservative
- Parents: Henry Myer Oppenheim (father); Sally Oppenheim-Barnes, Baroness Oppenheim-Barnes (mother)
- Education: Harrow School; Oriel College, Oxford
- Occupation: Businessman

Phillip Anthony Charles Lawrence Oppenheim (born 20 March 1956) is a British businessman and former politician.

== Early life ==
Oppenheim was born in Lambeth in South London, in 1956. He is the son of former Conservative government minister Sally Oppenheim-Barnes. His family is of Jewish descent.

== Education ==
Oppenheim was educated at Harrow School, in north-west London, and Oriel College, Oxford.

== Political career ==
Phillip Oppenheim was unexpectedly elected with the largest swing in the 1983 election as the Conservative Member of Parliament for the one time safe-Labour coal mining seat of Amber Valley. In the 1987 election he increased his vote share by over 10% in what was picked out by the election analysts David Butler and Robert Waller as being among a few "exceptional results" seen in "individual constituencies" in that election. He represented it until electoral defeat in the 1997 general election to Labour's Judy Mallaber.

During his time in Parliament, Oppenheim served in various ministerial posts in the governments of Margaret Thatcher and John Major and was also the parliamentary aide to Kenneth Clarke, the former Chancellor. While in parliament, he was known for strong free-market and free trade as well as socially liberal views, including supporting animal welfare issues and opposing the sport of fox hunting. As a Treasury minister, he toughened restrictions on imports of endangered species and introduced tax breaks on less-polluting fuels, including LPG. As a trade minister, he resisted efforts by the fur lobby to loosen restrictions on imports of trapped fur. He was also in favour of an elected House of Lords and electoral reform. An expert on trade policy, Oppenheim wrote two award-winning books (The New Masters in 1990 and Trade Wars in 1992) attacking US and European protectionism against both Japan and Third World countries. He has blamed this policy for contributing to poverty in the developing world.

Along with Humfrey Malins, Oppenheim established the Commons and Lords Rugby Club, which played its first match in 1991.

== Life and business career ==
Before entering Parliament, Oppenheim was a businessman, founding an information technology company which was sold to Reed Elsevier.

Oppenheim was a keen sportsman, running for Belgrave Harriers and playing rugby for his constituency team, Amber Valley.

He also ran the family beef and sheep farm near Gloucester, where his mother was the local MP, Sally Oppenheim, consumer affairs minister under Margaret Thatcher

After leaving Parliament in 1997, Oppenheim became a columnist for The Sunday Times and other newspapers. He has criticised new Labour's spin culture, along with what he saw as the corrupt sale of peerages, and the Conservative Party for its rightward and increasingly anti-EU drift.

Oppenheim is founder and CEO of the Cubana bar and restaurant in London and is credited for introducing Mojitos to the UK from Cuba in the 1990s.

He is also a founder director of Waterloo Quarter, a business-public alliance which aims to improve Waterloo. He trades directly with Cuba, importing rum and coffee and was also a director of Alma de Cuba coffee, a Cuban coffee brand owned by The Cuba Mountain Coffee Company, which had a project to help mountain coffee farmers in Cuba working with Nespresso, which ended when Donald Trump banned imports of Cuban coffee into the US in 2016.

Oppenheim also farms in Gloucestershire from where he also sells restored farm machinery with his son Alex and runs a small farm and hospitality business in Portugal's Setubal region.

He writes a blog, What's Wrong - confessions of an ex-Conservative.

== Notes ==
Parliament of the United Kingdom
New constituency	Member of Parliament for Amber Valley; 1983 – 1997	Succeeded by Judy Mallaber
Political offices
New creation	Exchequer Secretary to the Treasury; 1996–1997	Vacant Title next held by Angela Eagle
