= Shadow Exchequer Secretary to the Treasury =

Shadow Ministerial role

- Incumbent; John Cooper since 31 August 2026
- HM Treasury
- Style: Shadow Minister
- Appointer: Leader of the Opposition
- Inaugural holder: Lyn Brown
- Formation: 2018
- Website: The Shadow Cabinet

The shadow exchequer secretary to the treasury is a member of the Official Opposition frontbench in the United Kingdom. The officeholder shadows the exchequer secretary to the treasury. The current officeholder is Conservative MP James Wild shadowing Dan Tomlinson on the Treasury bench.

== List ==
Name	Portrait	Entered office	Left office	Political party	Leader of the Opposition
Rebecca Long-Bailey		18 September 2015	27 June 2016	Labour	Corbyn
Lyn Brown		12 January 2018	9 April 2020	Labour	Corbyn
Wes Streeting		9 April 2020	16 October 2020	Labour	Starmer
Abena Oppong-Asare		16 October 2020	5 September 2023	Labour	Starmer
Tanmanjeet Singh Dhesi		6 September 2023	27 November 2023	Labour	Starmer
Spencer Livermore, Baron Livermore		27 November 2023	5 July 2024	Labour	Starmer
Gareth Davies		19 July 2024	6 November 2024	Conservative	Sunak
James Wild		6 November 2024	31 August 2026	Conservative	Badenoch
John Cooper		31 August 2026	Incumbent	Conservative	Badenoch
