= Charlie Dewhirst =

British politician

Charlie Dewhirst MP
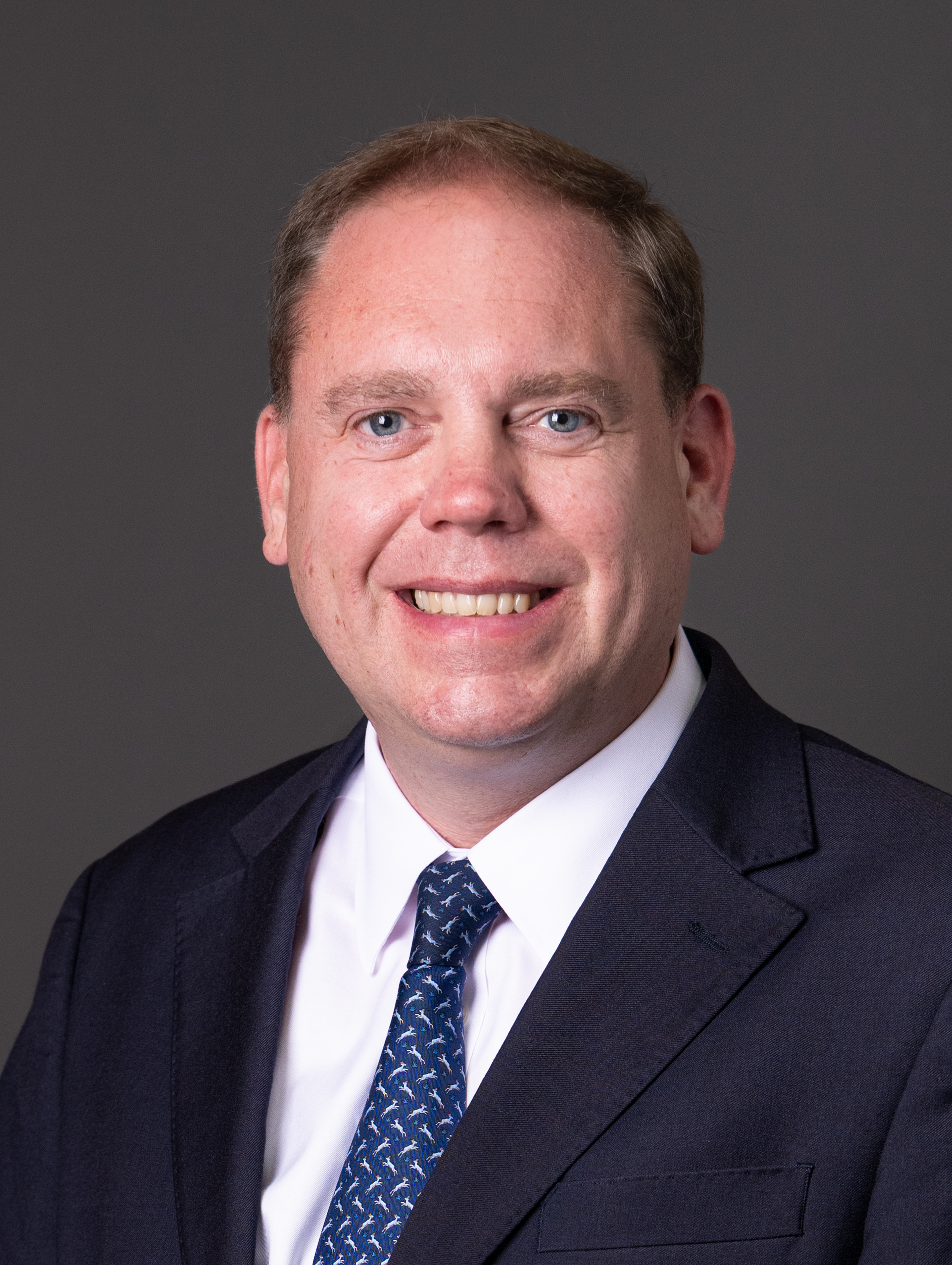
- Official portrait, 2026

Shadow Minister for the Union and Northern Ireland
- Incumbent
- Assumed office 2 Sepetmber 2026
- Leader: Kemi Badenoch
- Preceded by: Office Established

Member of Parliament for Bridlington and The Wolds
- Incumbent
- Assumed office 4 July 2024
- Preceded by: New constituency
- Majority: 3,125 (7.3%)

Personal details
- Born: 4 June 1980 (age 46) Beverley, England
- Party: Conservative
- Education: University of Edinburgh
- Website: www.charliedewhirst.uk

Charles Alistair Geoffrey Dewhirst (born 4 June 1980) is a British Conservative Party politician who has been Shadow Minister for the Union since 2026 and Member of Parliament (MP) for Bridlington and The Wolds since 2024.

== Early life ==
Dewhirst grew up near Driffield in the East Riding of Yorkshire, where his family were involved in textiles and farming. Dewhirst graduated from the University of Edinburgh with a Master of Arts in Business Studies.

During his time at university, Dewhirst worked as a DJ in Edinburgh's nightclubs.

== Professional career ==
After leaving university, Dewhirst worked in the press office at Hull City AFC before moving to London to continue his career in sports broadcasting at iSports TV. Having become involved in politics as an activist during the 2005 general election, Dewhirst then worked as a parliamentary aide to Greg Hands before becoming a consultant at the global communications agency, Burson-Marsteller, where he was involved in the introduction of the Groceries Code Adjudicator.

Dewhirst returned to sport in 2011 with UK Sport and was responsible for briefing COBRA on the performance of Team GB and ParalympicsGB during London 2012. He then moved onto work for the Rugby Football Union before taking on the role of Head of Communications for the 2019 UCI Road World Championships hosted in Yorkshire.

Following the impact of the COVID-19 pandemic on global sport, he returned to his farming roots and worked as Chief Policy Adviser to the National Pig Association until the 2024 general election.

== Political career ==
In 2010 Dewhirst was elected as a councillor for the Conservatives in Ravenscourt Park Ward in the London Borough of Hammersmith and Fulham, and re-elected in 2014. He served on the shadow cabinet from 2014 until he stood down from the council in 2018.

Dewhirst was the Conservative Party candidate for the constituency of Hammersmith in the 2015 general election and the 2017 general election.

In 2021, he was elected onto East Riding of Yorkshire Council in a by-election for the East Wolds and Coastal Ward. and re-elected in 2023 He became Deputy Leader of the Council in 2023 and remained in the role until the 2024 general election.

=== Parliament ===
Dewhirst is Parliamentary Private Secretary to the Shadow Chancellor of the Duchy of Lancaster and Shadow Secretary of State for Northern Ireland, Alex Burghart MP.

He is also a member of the House of Commons Environment, Food and Rural Affairs Select Committee.

== Personal life ==
Dewhirst lives with his wife and two children near Driffield.

== Electoral history ==
General election 2024: Bridlington and The Wolds
Party	Candidate	Votes	%	±%
Conservative	Charlie Dewhirst	14,846	34.6	−32.0
Labour	Sarah Carter	11,721	27.3	+7.4
Reform	Maria Bowtell	10,350	24.1	N/A
Liberal Democrats	Jayne Phoenix	3,097	7.2	−0.3
Green	Gill Leek	1,595	3.7	+0.9
Yorkshire	Tim Norman	915	2.1	−1.1
Independent	Tom Cone	309	0.7	N/A
SDP	Carlo Verda	104	0.2	N/A
Majority		3,125	7.3	−39.4
Turnout		42,937	58.9	−5.2
Registered electors		72,931		
Conservative hold		Swing	−19.7	

2017 general election: Hammersmith
Party	Candidate	Votes	%	±%
Labour	Andy Slaughter	33,375	63.9	+13.9
Conservative	Charlie Dewhirst	14,724	28.2	−8.2
Liberal Democrats	Joyce Onstad	2,802	5.4	+0.8
Green	Alex Horn	800	1.5	−2.9
UKIP	Jack Bovill	507	1.0	−3.4
Majority		18,651	35.7	+22.1
Turnout		52,252	71.8	+5.4
Registered electors		72,803		
Labour hold		Swing	+11.0	

2015 general election: Hammersmith
Party	Candidate	Votes	%	±%
Labour	Andy Slaughter	23,981	50.0	+6.1
Conservative	Charlie Dewhirst	17,463	36.4	0.0
Liberal Democrats	Millicent Scott	2,224	4.6	−11.3
Green	David Akan	2,105	4.4	+2.9
UKIP	Richard Wood	2,105	4.4	+3.2
Majority		6,518	13.6	+6.1
Turnout		47,960	66.4	+0.8
Registered electors		72,254		
Labour hold		Swing	+3.0	

Parliament of the United Kingdom
New constituency	Member of Parliament for Bridlington and The Wolds; 2024–present	Incumbent
