= Shadow Solicitor General =

Junior member of the Official Opposition frontbench

Shadow Solicitor General for England and Wales
- Incumbent; Jerome Mayhew since 2 September 2026
- Style: Shadow Minister
- Nominator: Leader of the Opposition
- Appointer: Leader of the Opposition
- Term length: At His Majesty's pleasure
- Inaugural holder: Jonathan Djanogly
- Formation: Around 2004

The shadow solicitor general is a member of the Official Opposition frontbench.

== Responsibilities ==
The shadow solicitor general shadows the solicitor general for England and Wales and deputises for the shadow attorney general for England and Wales.

== List of officeholders ==
- Peter Rawlinson - 16 October 1964 - 6 October 1965
- Nick Brown - 1 January 1985 - 1 January 1988
- Donald Anderson - 1 January 1994 - 1 January 1996

Name	Portrait	Entered office	Left office	Political party	Leader of the Opposition
Nick Hawkins		June 2003	May 2004	Conservative	Michael Howard
Jonathan Djanogly		May 2004	6 May 2010	Conservative	Michael Howard; David Cameron
Maria Eagle		11 May 2010	8 October 2010	Labour	Harriet Harman (Acting)
Catherine McKinnell		8 October 2010	7 October 2011	Labour	Ed Miliband
Karl Turner		3 December 2014	11 January 2016	Labour	Ed Miliband; Harriet Harman (Acting); Jeremy Corbyn
Jo Stevens		13 January 2016	6 October 2016	Labour	Jeremy Corbyn
Nick Thomas-Symonds		9 October 2016	5 April 2020	Labour	Jeremy Corbyn
Ellie Reeves		9 April 2020	4 December 2021	Labour	Sir Keir Starmer
Andy Slaughter		4 December 2021	27 November 2023	Labour	Sir Keir Starmer
Karl Turner		27 November 2023	5 July 2024	Labour	Sir Keir Starmer
Alberto Costa		19 July 2024	6 November 2024	Conservative	Rishi Sunak
Helen Grant		6 November 2024	31 August 2026	Conservative	Kemi Badenoch
Jerome Mayhew		31 August 2026	Incumbent	Conservative	Kemi Badenoch
