= Patrick Spencer (politician) =

British politician (born 1988)

The Honourable Patrick Spencer MP
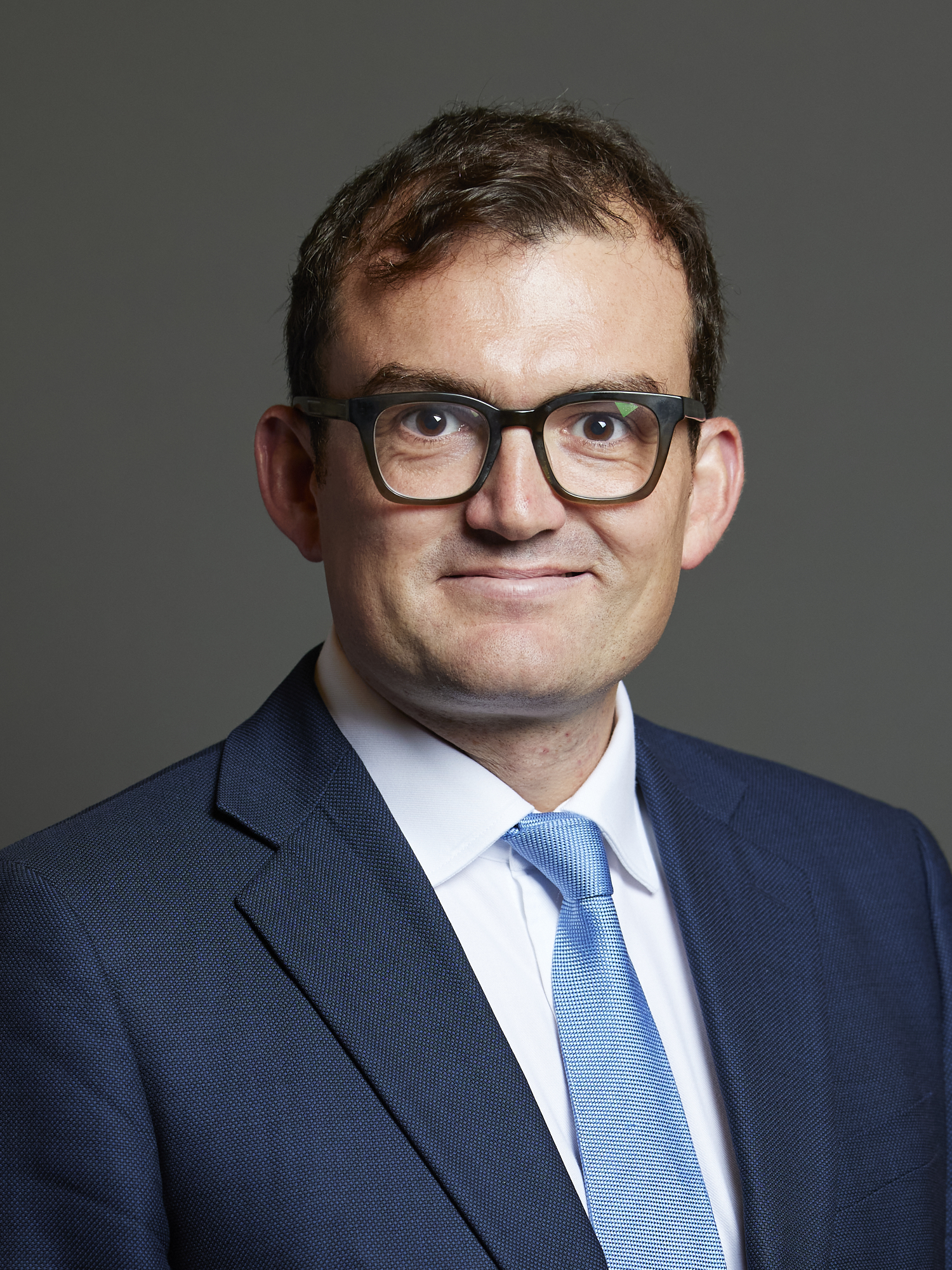
- Official portrait, 2024

Shadow Parliamentary Under-Secretary of State for Education
- Incumbent
- Assumed office 31 August 2026
- Leader: Kemi Badenoch

Member of Parliament for Central Suffolk and North Ipswich
- Incumbent
- Assumed office 4 July 2024
- Preceded by: Dan Poulter
- Majority: 4,290 (9.2%)

Personal details
- Born: 8 May 1988 (age 38)
- Party: Conservative
- Spouse: Anna (m. 2019)
- Children: 2
- Parent: Michael Spencer (father)
- Education: University of Leeds (BA); Georgetown University (MPP)
- Website: https://www.patrickspencer.co.uk/

Patrick Spencer (born 8 May 1988) is a British politician who has been Member of Parliament (MP) for Central Suffolk and North Ipswich since 2024.

He has worked at the Department for Education and was a senior fellow at the Centre for Social Justice.

== Early life and career ==
Patrick Spencer studied for a BA in politics at the University of Leeds and a master's in public policy at Georgetown University in Washington D.C. He began his career in finance and sat on the board of his family's investment business IPGL for seven years. After a short period working in finance, Spencer joined the Centre for Social Justice in 2016.

In 2019, he was appointed Head of Work and Welfare policy. He also published reports on Universal Basic Income.

In 2020, he became a Senior Policy Adviser on Children and Family Policy at the Department for Education working for four Secretaries of State for Education over the next three years, including Sir Gavin Williamson, Nadhim Zahawi, and Gillian Keegan. He was briefly a Director at the Jobs Foundation. He was heavily involved in the Government’s independent Review of Children’s Social Care which ran from 2021 to 2022.

== Volunteer work ==
He was a mentor with the Social Mobility Foundation and with the Living Wage Foundation.

== Political career ==
Patrick Spencer joined the Conservative Party while at university. In the 2017 general election, he was the Conservative candidate for West Ham. He won 16.2% of the vote. In June 2024, he was selected as the prospective parliamentary candidate for the seat of Central Suffolk and North Ipswich in the 2024 general election. He won with a majority of 4,290.

In July 2024, in his maiden speech Patrick Spencer spoke of the agricultural and historical nature of his constituency but also highlighted the deprivation in parts of it and pledged to fight for those who feel left behind.

Spencer was a member of the Education Select Committee and was appointed personal private secretary to Shadow Education spokesperson Laura Trott. He is also an officer for the APPG for Care-Experienced Children and Young People. In June 2025, he stepped down from the Education Select Committee .

He was appointed Opposition Assistant Whip in the September 2026 opposition reshuffle.

== Personal life ==
Spencer is the son of businessman Michael Spencer, who is also a former treasurer of the Conservative Party. Spencer lives in Woodbridge with his wife Anna and their two children.

On 13 May 2025, he was charged by the Metropolitan Police with two counts of sexual assault that allegedly took place at London's Groucho Club in August 2023. As a consequence, he had the Conservative Party whip withdrawn. He appeared at Westminster Magistrates' Court on 16 June where he made a plea of not guilty. On 17 July 2026, Spencer was found not guilty of sexual assault and had the Conservative Party whip reinstated.

== See also ==
- List of United Kingdom Conservative MPs (2024–present)

Parliament of the United Kingdom
Preceded by Dan Poulter	Member of Parliament for Central Suffolk and North Ipswich; 2024–present	Incumbent
