= David Reed (Conservative politician) =

British politician

David Reed MP
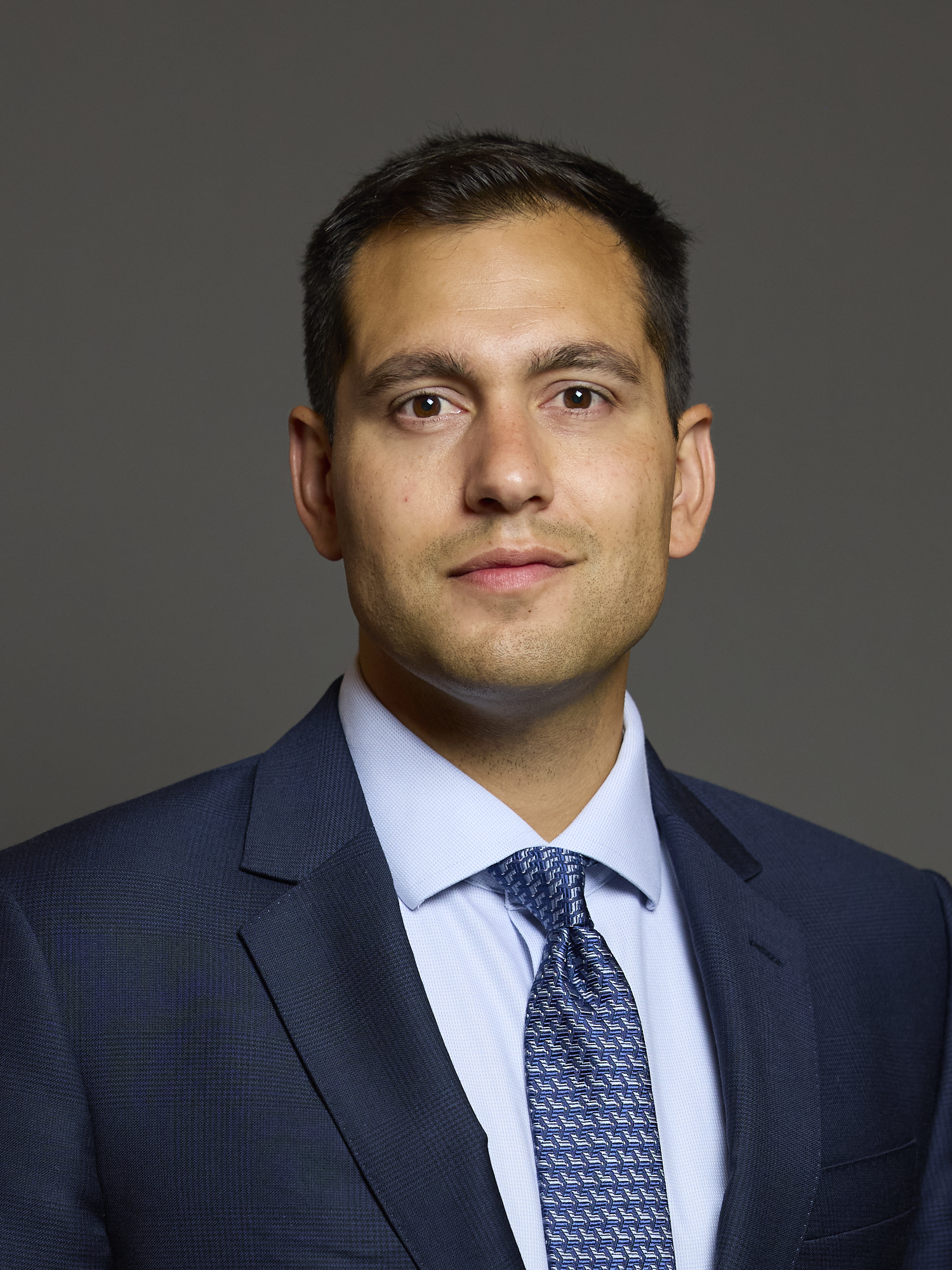
- Official portrait, 2024

Parliamentary Under-Secretary of State for Foreign, Commonwealth and Development Affairs
- Incumbent
- Assumed office 31 August 2026
- Leader: Kemi Badenoch
- Preceded by: Alec Shelbrooke (2025)

Member of Parliament for Exmouth and Exeter East
- Incumbent
- Assumed office 4 July 2024
- Preceded by: New constituency
- Majority: 121 (0.2%)

Personal details
- Born: December 1989 (age 36) Carshalton, London, England
- Party: Conservative
- Education: University of Bristol (MA)
- Website: https://www.davidreed.uk

Military service
- Allegiance: United Kingdom
- Unit: Royal Marines; Special Forces Support Group

David George Reed (born December 1989) is a British Conservative Party politician who has served as Member of Parliament for Exmouth and Exeter East since 2024. Reed is the Shadow Minister for Defence, Security and Resilience.

== Early life and education ==
Reed was born in Carshalton, south London. After joining the Royal Marines, Reed was based at the Lympstone Royal Marine Base where he decided to move to East Devon full time.

Reed started his career in the Royal Marines and the Special Forces Support Group and served in conflict zones around the world during a seven-year career. In addition to his frontline service, Reed was a parachutist on the Royal Navy Parachute Display Team, and he won a place on the Team GB Wingsuit Skydiving Squad.

After leaving the Royal Marines, Reed gained a first class Bachelor’s degree in Business, and a Master’s degree in International Security. He has also worked in Parliament and held volunteer campaign officer positions within the Conservative Party. Reed has also worked in cyberspace development in the public and private sectors, most recently in the defence firm, BAE Systems Digital Intelligence.

== Political career ==
Reed was elected as the inaugural MP for Exmouth and Exeter East in the 2024 general election. He captured the new seat with a narrow majority of just 121 votes, a margin of 0.2%. In September 2024, he delivered his maiden speech in the House of Commons, celebrating his new role and expressing deep pride in his constituency of Exmouth and Exeter East.

Since October 2024, he has served as Opposition Assistant Whip (Commons).

Reed was a member of the International Development Committee, which he joined in October 2024. He has also served on several legislative committees, including the Programming Sub-Committee for the Terrorism (Protection of Premises) Bill, the Armed Forces Commissioner Bill Committee, the Water (Special Measures) Bill [HL] Committee, and the Sustainable Aviation Fuel Bill Committee.

Reed introduced the Hunting Trophies (Import Prohibition) Bill, a Private Members’ Bill presented in October 2024. The bill sought to prohibit the import of hunting trophies into Great Britain.

He is a Vice Chair of the All Party Parliamentary Group (APPG) on Foreign Affairs. He previously held an officer role on the APPG on Explosive Weapons and Their Impact, where he focused on policy issues related to explosive ordnance and humanitarian demining.

On 10 June 2026, Reed hosted an adjournment debate on national resilience, where he called for a national conversation on preparedness and for the government to consider founding a ministry for national resilience. In September 2026, Reed became a Shadow Minister sitting across the shadow Foreign Office and Defence teams.

== Personal life ==
Reed lives in Exmouth, within his constituency of Exmouth and Exeter East.

== Electoral history ==
2022 Cheltenham Borough Council election: Park
Party	Candidate	Votes	%	±%
Liberal Democrats	Jacqueline Ann Chelin	1,304	53.4	+15.7
Conservative	David George Reed	926	37.9	−11.7
Green	Catherine Sunita Lyon Leggett	211	8.6	+0.3
Majority		378	15.5	
Turnout		2,441	48.9	−4.1
Liberal Democrats hold		Swing		

General election 2024: Exmouth and Exeter East
Party	Candidate	Votes	%	±%
Conservative	David Reed	14,728	28.7	−21.1
Labour	Helen Dallimore	14,607	28.5	+18.0
Liberal Democrats	Paul Arnott	11,387	22.2	+19.2
Reform	Garry Sutherland	7,085	13.8	+13.5
Green	Olly Davey	2,331	4.5	+2.8
Independent	Dan Wilson	590	1.1	N/A
Independent	Peter Faithfull	454	0.9	+0.4
Climate	Mark Baldwin	134	0.3	N/A
Majority		121	0.2	−15.6
Turnout		51,478	64.4	−10.5
Registered electors		79,983		
Conservative hold		Swing	−19.6	

Parliament of the United Kingdom
New constituency	Member of Parliament for Exmouth and Exeter East; 2024–present	Incumbent
