= Alison Griffiths (politician) =

British politician

Alison Griffiths MP
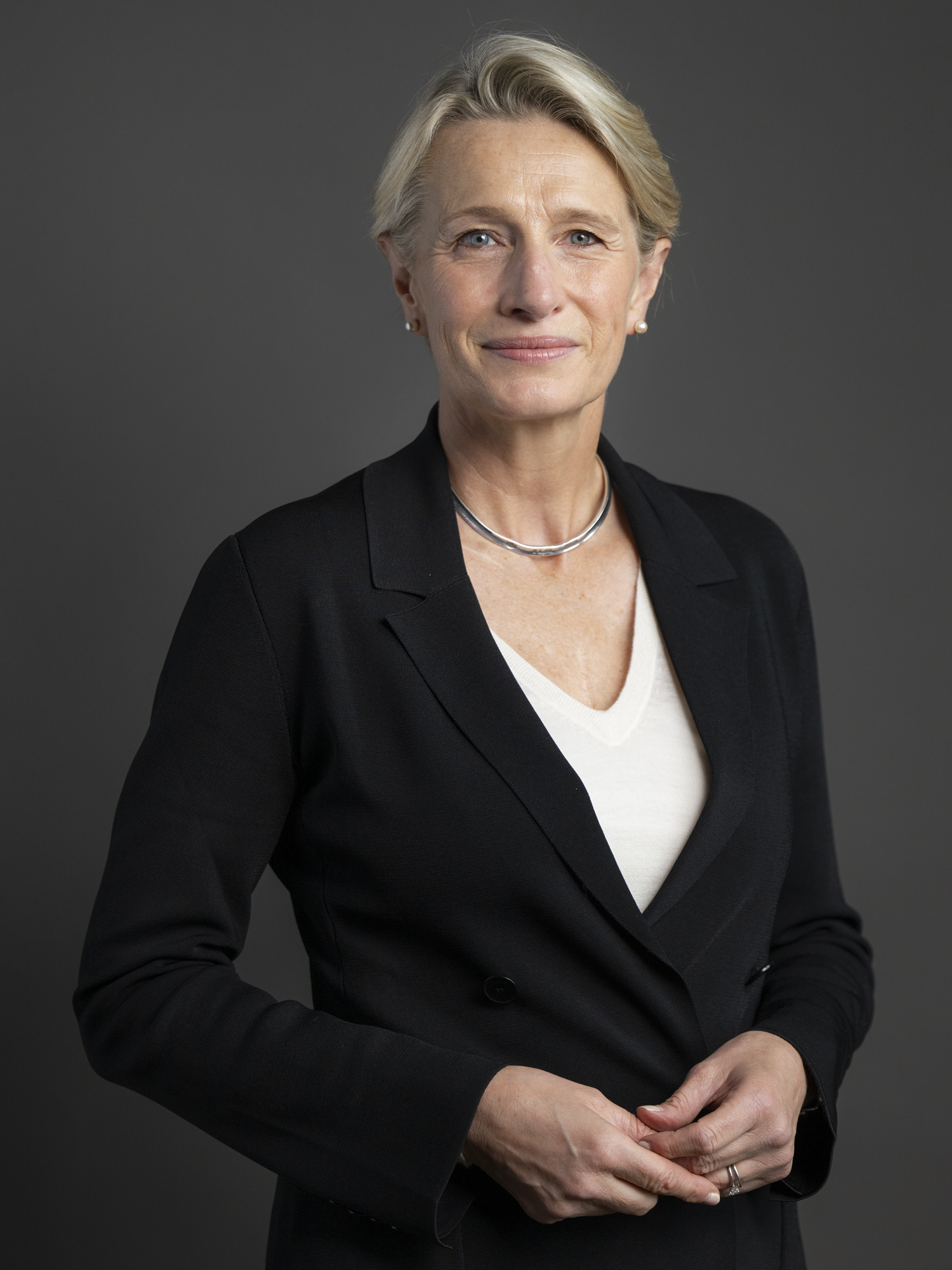
- Official portrait, 2024

Shadow Parliamentary Under-Secretary of State for Transport
- Incumbent
- Assumed office 31 August 2026
- Leader: Kemi Badenoch
- Preceded by: Greg Smith

Member of Parliament for Bognor Regis and Littlehampton
- Incumbent
- Assumed office 4 July 2024
- Preceded by: Nick Gibb
- Majority: 1,765 (3.7%)

Personal details
- Born: June 1969 (age 57)
- Party: Conservative
- Website: www.alisongriffiths.org.uk

Alison Louise Griffiths (born June 1969) is a British Conservative Party politician, who has been Member of Parliament (MP) for Bognor Regis and Littlehampton since 2024.

== Early career ==
She has worked as a Chief Marketing Officer and Strategy Director in cybersecurity and other technology sectors.

== Political career ==
In the 2024 General Election, Griffiths was elected Member of Parliament (MP) for Bognor Regis and Littlehampton with 15,678 votes (32.8%) and a majority of 1,765 over the second place Labour candidate.

Griffiths was elected as member of the Business and Trade Select Committee on 21 October 2024. She has also served on the Environmental Audit Committee since 3 March 2025.

Griffiths has served as Shadow Parliamentary Under Secretary of State for Transport since 31 August 2026.

Parliament of the United Kingdom
Preceded by Nick Gibb	Member of Parliament for Bognor Regis and Littlehampton; 2024–present	Incumbent
