= Shadow Financial Secretary to the Treasury =

Shadow ministerial position

- Incumbent; Vacant since 13 January 2026
- Appointer: Leader of the Opposition
- Website: The Shadow Cabinet

In British politics, the shadow financial secretary to the Treasury (or colloquially Shadow Financial Secretary) is a shadow ministerial position of the Official Opposition that acts as the primary opposition to the equivalent position Financial Secretary to the Treasury, a government minister in HM Treasury. The position is currently held by Gareth Davies.

== Office-holders ==
Former office holders include:

- Stuart Holland (1987-1989)
- Sir Oliver Letwin (23 July 1999 - 10 January 2000)
- Sir David Lidington (8 October 2001 - 1 October 2002)
- Sir Stephen O'Brien (1 June 2002 - 30 June 2002)
- Mark Prisk (1 June 2002 - 1 June 2003)
- Andrew Tyrie (11 November 2003 - 15 March 2004)

Name	Portrait	Entered office	Left office	Political party	Leader of the Opposition
Mark Field born 1964		10 May 2005	8 December 2005	Conservative	Michael Howard
Mark Hoban born 1964		8 December 2005	6 May 2010	Conservative	David Cameron
Stephen Timms born 1955		12 May 2010	8 October 2010	Labour	Harriet Harman (Acting)
Chris Leslie born 1972		8 October 2010	7 October 2013	Labour	Ed Miliband
Shabana Mahmood born 1980		7 October 2013	8 May 2015	Labour	Ed Miliband
Alison McGovern born 1980		8 May 2015	18 September 2015	Labour	Harriet Harman (Acting)
Rob Marris born 1955		18 September 2015	30 June 2016	Labour	Jeremy Corbyn
Peter Dowd born 1957		6 October 2016	9 February 2017	Labour	Jeremy Corbyn
Anneliese Dodds born 1978		3 July 2017	5 April 2020	Labour	Jeremy Corbyn
Dan Carden born 1986		6 April 2020	15 October 2020	Labour	Sir Keir Starmer
James Murray born 1983		16 October 2020	5 July 2024	Labour	Sir Keir Starmer
Nigel Huddleston born 1970		19 July 2024	8 November 2024	Conservative	Rishi Sunak
Gareth Davies born 1970		8 November 2024	13 January 2026	Conservative	Kemi Badenoch
