= Gareth Davies (English politician) =

British politician (born 1984)

Gareth Davies MP
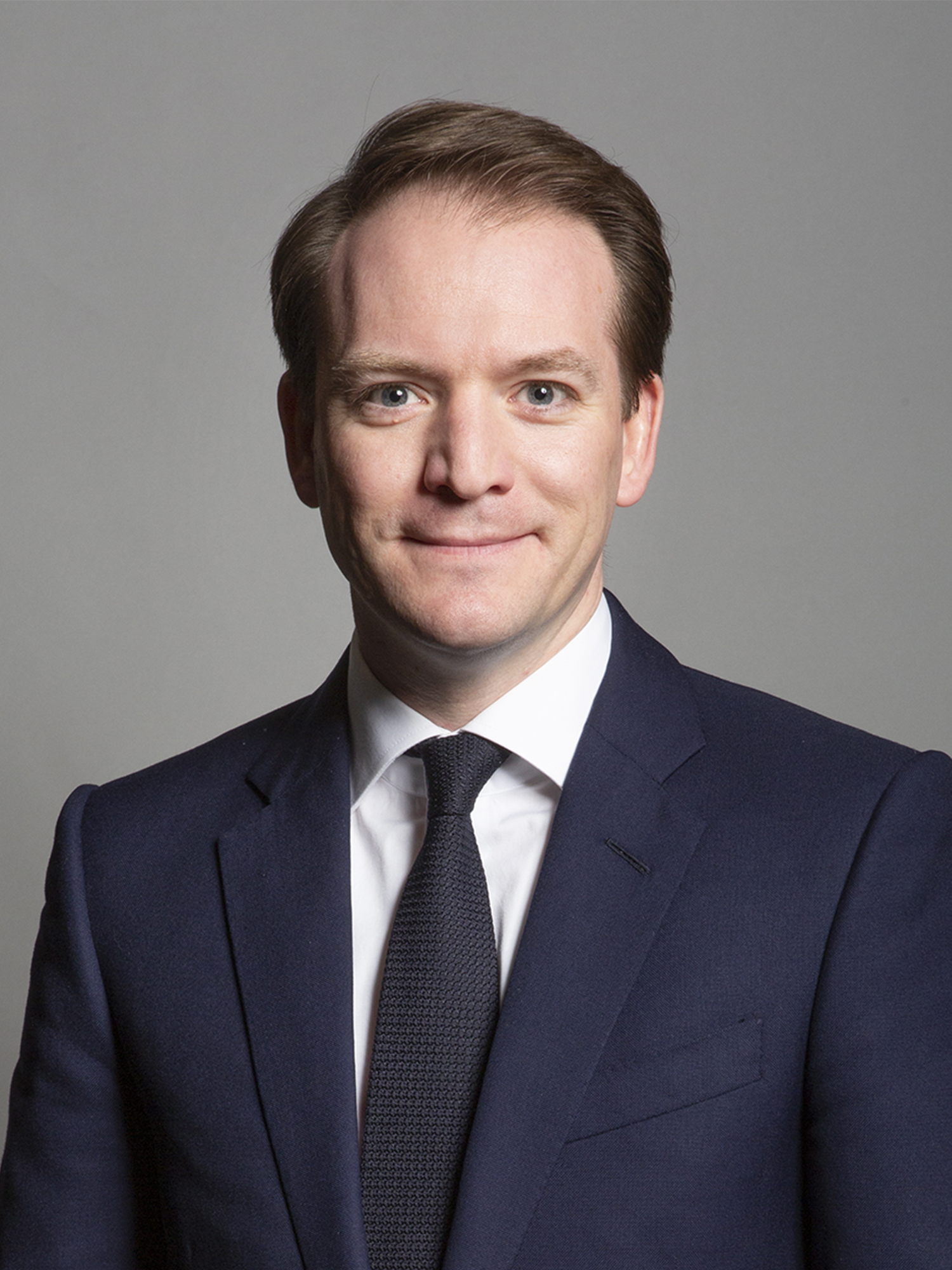
- Official portrait, 2019

Shadow Minister for Business and Trade
- In office 22 July 2025 – 31 August 2026
- Leader: Kemi Badenoch
- Preceded by: Greg Smith
- Succeeded by: Bradley Thomas and Peter Fortune

Shadow Financial Secretary to the Treasury
- Incumbent
- Assumed office 31 August 2026
- Leader: Kemi Badenoch
- Preceded by: himself
- In office 8 November 2024 – 13 January 2026
- Leader: Kemi Badenoch
- Preceded by: Nigel Huddleston
- Succeeded by: Vacant

Shadow Exchequer Secretary to the Treasury
- In office 19 July 2024 – 6 November 2024
- Leader: Rishi Sunak
- Preceded by: The Lord Livermore
- Succeeded by: James Wild

Exchequer Secretary to the Treasury
- In office 21 April 2023 – 5 July 2024
- Prime Minister: Rishi Sunak
- Preceded by: James Cartlidge
- Succeeded by: James Murray

Member of Parliament for Grantham and Bourne Grantham and Stamford (2019–2024)
- Incumbent
- Assumed office 12 December 2019
- Preceded by: Nick Boles
- Majority: 4,496 (9.7%)

Personal details
- Born: Gareth Mark Davies; 31 March 1984 (age 42) Leeds, West Yorkshire, England
- Party: Conservative
- Spouse: Laura Davies (m. 2019)
- Education: University of Nottingham (BA) Harvard University (MPA)
- Website: garethdavies.co.uk

Gareth Mark Davies (born 31 March 1984) is a British politician who has been Member of Parliament (MP) for Grantham and Bourne, formerly Grantham and Stamford, since 2019. A member of the Conservative Party, he previously served as Exchequer Secretary to the Treasury from 2023 to 2024 under Rishi Sunak.

Born in Leeds, Davies studied at the University of Nottingham and later completed a Master's of Public Administration at Harvard University. He worked at Threadneedle Investments after graduating in 2006 until his election as an MP. Financial News named him a rising star in European Finance in 2018. He was a volunteer for the Conservative party before his election as an MP. He unsuccessfully stood for the Doncaster Central seat in the 2010 general election, and the Leeds Central in the 2017 general election. Davies was elected to Parliament in the safe seat of Grantham and Stamford at the 2019 general election. He went on to serve on the House of Commons Finance Select Committee and also the Treasury Select Committee.

Davies was appointed Parliamentary Private Secretary (PPS) at the Department of Health and Social Care before resigning during the 2022 government crisis. He became PPS to Chancellor Jeremy Hunt in November of the same year. In April 2023, he joined the government as Exchequer Secretary to the Treasury. After the defeat of the Conservative party in the 2024 general election, he became Shadow Exchequer Secretary to the Treasury in the caretaker Sunak opposition frontbench. After the election of Kemi Badenoch as party leader in November 2024, Davies was promoted to Shadow Financial Secretary to the Treasury, serving in the role until January 2026. In July 2025, he was appointed a Shadow Business minister.

== Early life ==
Davies was born in Leeds, West Yorkshire, as the eldest of two sons. His mother and father were a state primary school teacher and a small business owner respectively.

He attended state comprehensive schools in Leeds and Hull. Davies later completed his undergraduate studies at the University of Nottingham, graduating in 2006. He then completed a Master's of Public Administration at the John F. Kennedy School of Government at Harvard University in 2016, focusing on economics, trade, and foreign affairs. During his time at Harvard, he travelled to North Korea on a study visit.

== Business career ==
Davies began working in the investment industry in 2006 as a graduate trainee at Threadneedle Investments, an asset management firm. Threadneedle later became Columbia Threadneedle Investments. He worked there until his election as an MP. He travelled for his work across the United States, Europe, China, and the Asia-Pacific region, advising global pension funds, private banks, and sovereign wealth funds.

While at Columbia Threadneedle Investments, he helped create the firm's first charitable foundation, which supports small British charities focused on social mobility.

In 2018, Davies was named as a 'rising star' in European finance by Financial News.

== Political career ==
Davies worked for the Conservative Party on a voluntary basis before entering Parliament. At the 2010 general election he stood as the Conservative candidate for Doncaster Central, finishing second with 24.8% of the vote. At the snap 2017 UK general election he stood as the Conservative candidate in Leeds Central, finishing second with 20.5% of the vote behind the incumbent Labour MP Hilary Benn.

Ahead of the 2019 general election, he was selected as the prospective Conservative candidate for Grantham and Stamford. It is a safe Conservative seat, having elected a member of the party since 1997. At the 2019 general election, Davies was elected as MP with 65.7% of the vote and a majority of 26,003, achieving a swing of 5.4% and the largest majority in the seat's history. He made his maiden speech in Parliament in March 2020.

Davies served on the House of Commons Finance Select Committee between 2020 and 2023 and the Treasury Select Committee between 2021 and 2022. Following one session of the Treasury Select Committee in May 2022, Davies garnered media attention when Andrew Bailey, the Governor of the Bank of England, admitted to him that he felt "helpless" in the face of rising inflation.

In 2021, Davies introduced a Private Member's Bill to the Commons, which was entitled the Paternity (Leave and Pay) Bill. The bill was based on a policy report Davies wrote for the Centre for Social Justice. It aimed to extend the eligibility of paternity leave and pay to include more fathers, as well as to provide for more flexibility in the timing of and notice period for paternity leave. However, the bill never progressed beyond its second reading.

Davies was appointed Parliamentary Private Secretary (PPS) at the Department of Health and Social Care. He was later appointed PPS to the Chancellor of the Exchequer, Jeremy Hunt, in November 2022.

=== Exchequer Secretary to the Treasury ===
Davies was appointed as Exchequer Secretary to the Treasury by Prime Minister Rishi Sunak in April 2023, with responsibilities covering taxation policy, economic growth, infrastructure finance, foreign direct investment and investment strategy.

As part of his national infrastructure remit, Davies contributed to the strategic direction of the UK Infrastructure Bank, supported the work of the National Infrastructure Commission, and wrote the foreword to the National Infrastructure and Construction Pipeline 2023 report, which outlined £700–775 billion in planned public and private infrastructure investment over the coming decade.

His portfolio also included energy and environmental taxation, such as the Energy Profits Levy and carbon trading frameworks, policies linked to the government’s green finance and clean energy investment agenda.

During his tenure, he oversaw the Finance Bill, which introduced permanent full expensing for plant and machinery, a policy forecast to generate approximately £3 billion of additional business investment per year and boost UK productivity.

He announced the extension of the government’s Investment Zones programme from five to ten years, with each zone receiving a £160 million funding and tax incentive package designed to attract capital investment.

Under his oversight, the East Midlands Investment Zone secured £9.3 million in anchor investment, with an expected £323 million of follow-on private investment and 4,000 jobs, alongside major projects such as a £1 billion advanced manufacturing and logistics development linked to East Midlands Airport.

=== Opposition ===
In the 2024 general election, he was elected in the newly named constituency of Grantham and Bourne with a much reduced majority of 4,496 (9.7%). He was appointed as Shadow Exchequer Secretary from July 2024 to November 2024 in Rishi Sunak's caretaker opposition frontbench.

He supported Robert Jenrick in the 2024 Conservative Party leadership election. After Kemi Badenoch became Conservative Leader, she appointed Davies as Shadow Financial Secretary, but he left the role in 2026. He was appointed Shadow Business Minister in July 2025.

He opposed the Terminally Ill Adults (End of Life) Bill, which seeks to legalise assisted dying.

=== Private capital ===
Davies has described himself in an interview with the Financial Times as "a businessman in politics" and has used his time in Parliament to push for more policies that mobilise private capital.

He chairs the All‑Party Parliamentary Group (APPG) on Private Capital. The APPG provides a cross-party forum for dialogue between parliamentarians and representatives of the private equity and venture capital industries, focusing on policy development, investment frameworks, and the role of private capital in supporting the UK economy.

Davies has described the group as a platform for engaging with global investment trends and for highlighting how private equity and institutional capital can drive innovation, job creation, and infrastructure funding beyond traditional public finance.

In an interview with Private Equity International, Davies argued that the UK must create a more competitive and constructive environment for private equity, particularly around taxation and carried interest, and warned that excessive ESG-driven mandates risk diverting focus from fiduciary responsibilities and investor returns.

== Political views ==
Davies is considered to be on the right of the Conservative parliamentary party and is a member of the 92 Group of Conservative MPs, an invitation-only group associated with furthering Thatcherism.

Davies successfully lobbied the Government to issue its first ever sovereign green bond, which the Chancellor announced in 2020. This policy saw the Government issue over £10 billion of dedicated debt to "specifically fund capital investment in infrastructure that will help stimulate the British economy."

In October 2020, Davies authored a report for Onward on the case for a British development bank. The Government later announced the launch of the UK Infrastructure Bank in 2021.

In March 2022, Davies wrote a report titled 'Investing for Prosperity' for the Centre for Policy Studies. In the report, he called for the reform of British International Investment (BII) to unlock new sources of capital and harness new financial instruments. In November 2023 the Foreign Secretary, David Cameron, published an FCDO white paper which included a commitment to implement a number of reforms to BII championed by Davies.

Davies has been a staunch opponent of the 4.2 mile (6.76 km) Mallard Pass Solar Farm, which straddles Lincolnshire and Rutland, and aims to provide renewable energy to 92,000 homes.

Davies has written several opinion pieces for the Daily Telegraph, CityAm, Financial Times, and The Times and has regularly appeared as a commentator on national and international television and radio.

== Personal life ==
Davies is married to Laura Davies and lives in his constituency of Grantham and Bourne. Davies is a Senior Fellow at the Harvard Kennedy School’s Mossavar-Rahmani Center for Business and Government, focusing on the intersection of public policy and global investment.

Parliament of the United Kingdom
Preceded by Nick Boles	Member of Parliament for Grantham and Stamford; 2019–2024	Constituency abolished
New constituency	Member of Parliament for Grantham and Bourne; 2024–present	Incumbent
