= John Cooper (British politician) =

Scottish Member of Parliament and Former Journalist

John Cooper MP
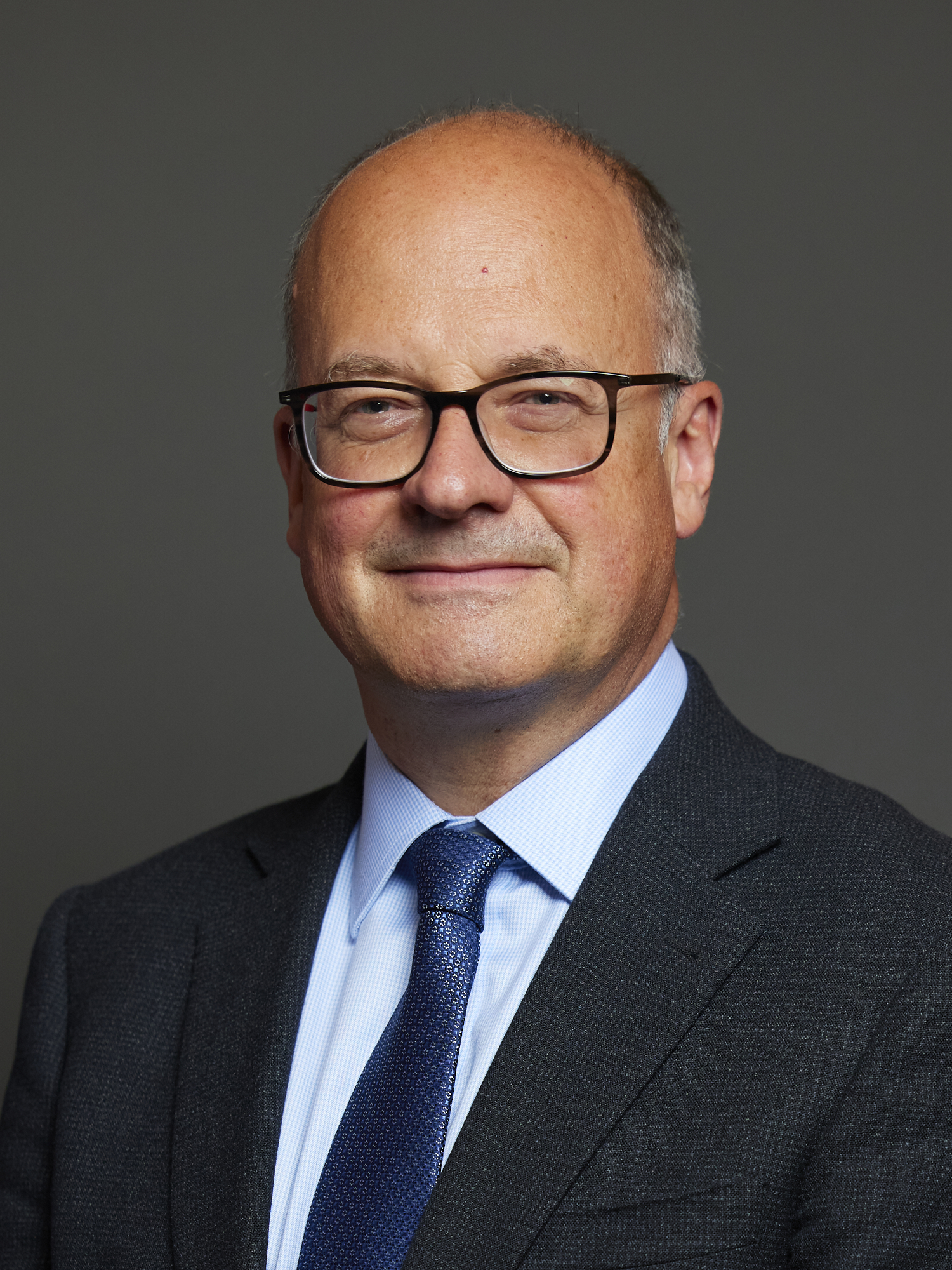
- Official portrait, 2024

Shadow Exchequer Secretary to the Treasury
- Incumbent
- Assumed office 31 August 2026
- Leader: Kemi Badenoch
- Preceded by: James Wild

Member of Parliament for Dumfries and Galloway
- Incumbent
- Assumed office 4 July 2024
- Preceded by: Alister Jack
- Majority: 930 (2.1%)

Personal details
- Born: John Matthew Cooper
- Party: Conservative
- Spouse: Patricia Cooper
- Children: 3
- Education: University of Birmingham (MA)
- Website: John Cooper MP website

John Matthew Cooper is a Scottish Conservative Party politician and journalist, serving as Member of Parliament (MP) for Dumfries and Galloway since 2024.

He previously served as editor of the Stranraer and Wigtownshire Free Press from 2019 to 2022.

== Early life and career ==
Cooper started his career working on the Stranraer and Wigtownshire Free Press weekly newspaper in 1984. He subsequently returned as editor in 2019. He has also worked at the Sunday Mail, Edinburgh Evening News, Irish Daily Mail and Scottish Daily Mail.

== Parliamentary career ==
Following the decision of sitting MP Alister Jack not to seek re-election in 2024, Cooper—who had served as Jack's special adviser on media relations—was selected as the Scottish Conservative Party candidate for Dumfries and Galloway. He successfully held the seat for the Conservatives in the 2024 general election, maintaining a majority of 930 votes.

In Westminster, Cooper has focused on economic and industrial policy. On 21 October 2024, he was elected to the Business and Trade Select Committee, and in March 2025, he was further appointed to the Sub-Committee on Economic Security, Arms and Export Controls. Throughout 2025 and early 2026, his parliamentary work has been defined by advocacy for South Scotland infrastructure, specifically regarding the A75 and A77 road corridors.

John Cooper led a debate in Parliament on the fish and chips industry, highlighting local issues in Dumfries and Galloway. Cooper also lodged a Ten Minute Rule Bill seeking to split the dual roles - as chief prosecutor and Scottish Government advisor - of the Lord Advocate in Scotland.

== Personal life ==
Cooper was raised in Stranraer and attended Rephad Primary and Stranraer Academy. He has cited his upbringing in the region as a primary influence on his political focus on rural depopulation. He is married to Patricia, a journalist originally from Dumfries; the couple have three children.

Outside of his political and journalistic career, Cooper is a musician who has played the drums in various bands since his teenage years. In a 2025 interview with Holyrood, he described his early years as a "straight-A student" by day and a "rock and roll" drummer by night. He is also a motorsport enthusiast and an advocate for lifelong learning, having completed a Master of Arts (MA) in Military History from the University of Birmingham via distance learning.

Parliament of the United Kingdom
Preceded by Alister Jack	Member of Parliament for Dumfries and Galloway; 2024–present	Incumbent
