= Sarah Bool =

British politician

Sarah Bool MP
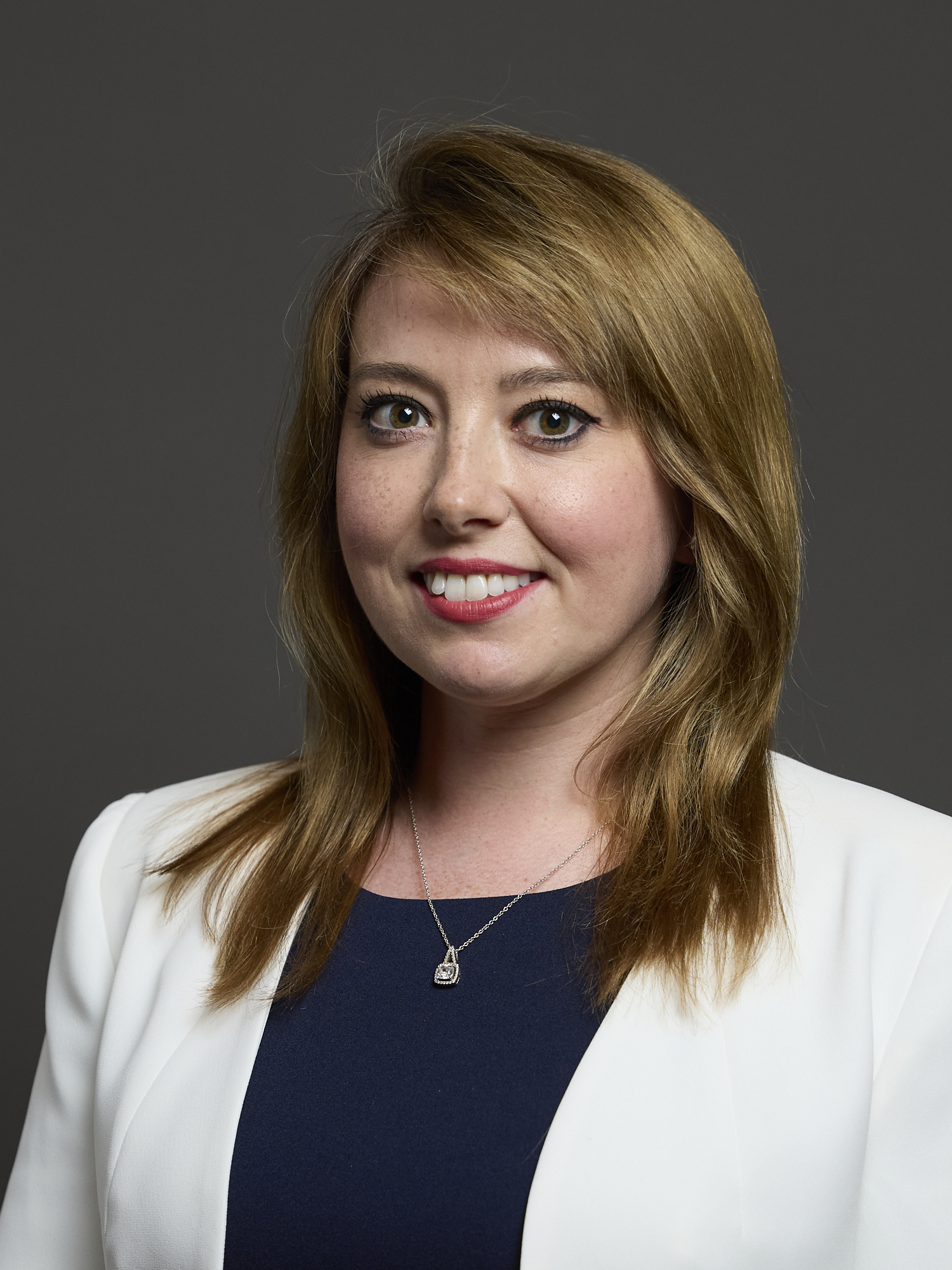
- Official portrait, 2024

Shadow Parliamentary Under-Secretary of State for the Home Office and Justice
- Incumbent
- Assumed office 31 August 2026
- Leader: Kemi Badenoch

Opposition Assistant Whip
- Incumbent
- Assumed office 31 August 2026
- Leader: Kemi Badenoch

Member of Parliament for South Northamptonshire
- Incumbent
- Assumed office 4 July 2024
- Preceded by: Andrea Leadsom
- Majority: 3,687 (6.8%)

Personal details
- Born: Sarah Anne-Marie Bool; 1987 or 1988 (age 37–38)
- Party: Conservative
- Education: Oriel College, Oxford
- Website: www.sarahbool.uk

Sarah Anne-Marie Bool (born 1987 or 1988) is a British Conservative Party politician and non-practising solicitor who has been the Member of Parliament for South Northamptonshire since the July 2024 general election.

== Early life and education ==
Bool is the daughter of Kenneth and Maureen Bool and has two siblings. She grew up in Rutland and attended English Martyrs Primary School in Oakham and Stamford High School. Bool read modern history at Oriel College, Oxford before completing a law conversion course at the College of Law in London before embarking on her legal training. Her father, Ken Bool, was a Conservative councillor on Rutland County Council.

== Political career ==
In the 2019 general election she stood as the Conservative candidate for Vauxhall, coming third behind Labour and the Liberal Democrats.

In the 2024 general election she succeeded Andrea Leadsom as MP for South Northamptonshire. Bool is chair of the executive committee of the Society of Conservative Lawyers.

Bool has type 1 diabetes, only being diagnosed aged 33. Bool called in Parliament for a paediatric screening programme for the disease in order to protect children from diabetic ketoacidosis and the risk to life this poses. The topic was the subject of her first speaking opportunity at Prime Minister’s Questions. Bool has also given evidence to the Modernisation Committee about difficulties managing her condition alongside Parliamentary procedure.

In April 2025, Bool visited the Falkland Islands as part of the Armed Forces Parliamentary Scheme.

Locally, Bool has been critical of plans to develop Green Hill Solar Farm.

== Electoral history ==
General election 2019: Vauxhall
Party	Candidate	Votes	%	±%
Labour Co-op	Florence Eshalomi	31,615	56.1	−1.2
Liberal Democrats	Sarah Lewis	12,003	21.3	+0.8
Conservative	Sarah Bool	9,422	16.7	−1.9
Green	Jacqueline Bond	2,516	4.5	+2.5
Brexit Party	Andrew McGuinness	641	1.1	New
Independent	Salah Faissal	136	0.2	New
Majority		19,612	34.8	−2.0
Turnout		56,333	63.5	−3.6
Registered electors		88,659		
Labour Co-op hold		Swing	−1.0	

General election 2024: South Northamptonshire
Party	Candidate	Votes	%	±%
Conservative	Sarah Bool	19,191	35.7	−27.5
Labour	Rufia Ashraf	15,504	28.9	+8.1
Reform	Paul Hogan	8,962	16.7	New
Liberal Democrats	Stewart Tolley	4,989	9.3	−1.8
Green	Emmie Williamson	3,040	5.7	+1.9
Independent	Ian McCord	1,556	2.9	New
Workers Party	Mick Stott	246	0.5	New
Independent	Stuart Robert	209	0.4	New
Majority		3,687	6.8	−35.6
Turnout		53,697	68.6	−4.3
Registered electors		78,233		
Conservative hold		Swing	−17.8	

Parliament of the United Kingdom
Preceded by Andrea Leadsom	Member of Parliament for South Northamptonshire; 2024–present	Incumbent
