= James Wild (politician) =

British conservative politician

James Wild MP
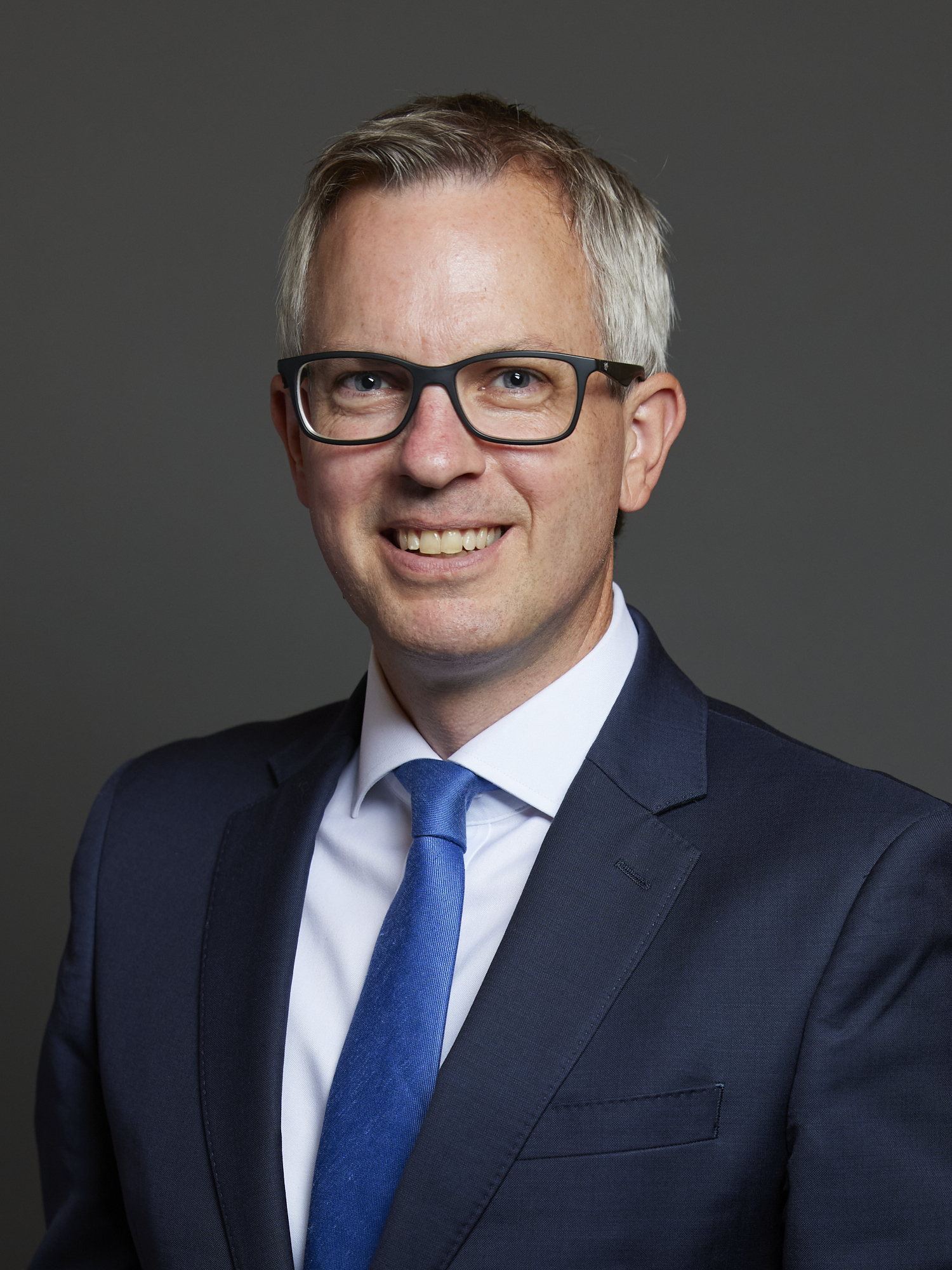
- Official portrait, 2024

Shadow Minister for Digital, Culture, Media and Sport
- Incumbent
- Assumed office 31 August 2026
- Leader: Kemi Badenoch

Shadow Exchequer Secretary to the Treasury
- In office 6 November 2024 – 31 August 2026
- Leader: Kemi Badenoch
- Preceded by: Gareth Davies
- Succeeded by: John Cooper

Shadow Minister for Education
- In office 19 July 2024 – 6 November 2024
- Leader: Rishi Sunak; Kemi Badenoch
- Preceded by: Helen Hayes
- Succeeded by: Neil O'Brien

Member of Parliament for North West Norfolk
- Incumbent
- Assumed office 12 December 2019
- Preceded by: Henry Bellingham
- Majority: 4,954 (11.1%)

Personal details
- Born: James Oliver Wild; 5 January 1977 (age 49) Norwich, England
- Party: Conservative
- Spouse: The Baroness Evans of Bowes Park (m. 2010)
- Education: Queen Mary University of London

James Oliver Wild (born 5 January 1977) is a British Conservative Party politician who has been the Member of Parliament (MP) for North West Norfolk since 2019. He has been Shadow Exchequer Secretary to the Treasury since November 2024, and was Shadow Minister for Education from July to November 2024.

== Early life and career ==
James Wild was born on 5 January 1977 in Norwich, the son of Keith and Rhona Wild. He attended Manor Road Primary School, the fee-paying Norwich School, and later studied at Queen Mary College, University of London, where he obtained a BA in politics in 1998.

In 1999, he became Head of Information and Research at the Communication Group, holding the role until 2001. From 2000 to 2001, he was Business Policy Advisor to the Conservative Research Department. Wild worked as a Senior Account Executive for Politics Direct from 2001 to 2004.

He then worked in public relations, initially as a Public Affairs Manager for T Mobile (from 2004 to 2009), and then as an Account Director for Hanover Communications (from 2009 to 2012).

From 2012 to 2014, Wild was a Special Advisor to the Minister for Business and Energy. He became a Special Adviser to the Secretary of State for Defence in 2014, remaining in the role until 2017. He was made Chief of Staff to the Chancellor of the Duchy of Lancaster and Minister for the Cabinet Office in 2018, and the following year, became a Senior Special Adviser to the Prime Minister.

== Parliamentary career ==
In November 2019, he became the Conservative Party candidate for North West Norfolk. At the 2019 general election, Wild was elected as MP for North West Norfolk with 65.7% of the vote and a majority of 19,922.

On 16 January 2020, Wild delivered his Maiden Speech in the House of Commons in the Health and Social Care debate. Wild was a member of the Public Accounts Committee from March 2020 to November 2022.

Wild was critical of the cost of the NHS Test and Trace system, saying that "mistakes have been made". Wild highlighted the "overuse of consultants" as a particular problem.

Wild condemned the approach of the Metropolitan Police to the Sarah Everard vigil, saying "policing is by consent" and that "tonight the [Metropolitan Police] have failed [and] the scenes of women being manhandled at a vigil are appalling".

In March 2021, Wild asked the BBC Director General, Tim Davie, about the lack of union flags in the BBC's annual report. Wild suggested that the upcoming annual report could include "some imagery around the union flag".

In the July–September 2022 Conservative Party leadership election, Wild supported Rishi Sunak.

At the 2024 general election, Wild was re-elected to Parliament as MP for North West Norfolk with a decreased vote share of 36.1% and a decreased majority of 4,954.

== Personal life ==
Wild married Natalie Evans in 2010, who became a life peer in 2014. She served as Leader of the House of Lords and Lord Keeper of the Privy Seal from 2016 to 2022.

He is a member of Norwich City Football Club.

Parliament of the United Kingdom
Preceded by Henry Bellingham	Member of Parliament for North West Norfolk; 2019–present	Incumbent
