= British Government frontbench =

List of British government ministers

The Government frontbench in the Parliament of the United Kingdom, also known as the Treasury Bench, consists of the Cabinet and all other ministers. Parliamentary opposition to the Government frontbench is provided by the Official Opposition frontbench and the Liberal Democrat frontbench team. This article is a list of the frontbench under Andy Burnham; for a full list of current and previous ministers of this government, see Burnham ministry.

== List of current ministers ==
As of 20 July 2026, the makeup of the current Government frontbench is as follows:

Member of the House of Commons
Member of the House of Lords
Member of the Privy Council
Cabinet full members in **bold**
Cabinet attendees in **bold italics**

=== Prime Minister and Cabinet Office ===
Cabinet Office including Prime Minister's Office 10 Downing Street
Prime Minister; First Lord of the Treasury; Minister for the Civil Service; Minister for the Union	**Andy Burnham**
First Secretary of State; Chancellor of the Duchy of Lancaster; Minister for the Cabinet Office	**Louise Haigh**
Minister of State (Minister for Intergovernmental Relations and European Relations) (jointly with Foreign, Commonwealth and Development Office)	**Hamish Falconer**
Minister of State (Minister for Artificial Intelligence) (jointly with Department for Business, Innovation, Science and Trade)	**Kanishka Narayan**
Minister of State (Security Minister) (jointly with Home Office)	Dan Jarvis
Parliamentary Secretary	Sally Jameson (also Parliamentary Under-Secretary of State in the Ministry of Housing, Communities and Local Government)
Parliamentary Secretary	Daniel Tomlinson (also Exchequer Secretary to the Treasury (Minister for Growth))
Parliamentary Secretary	Mark Ferguson
Parliamentary Secretary	The Baroness Twycross (also Parliamentary Under-Secretary of State in the Department for Digital, Culture, Media and Sport)

=== Foreign relations ===
Foreign, Commonwealth and Development Office
Secretary of State for Foreign, Commonwealth and Development Affairs	**Ed Miliband**
Minister of State (Minister for Intergovernmental Relations and European Relations) (jointly with Cabinet Office)	**Hamish Falconer**
Minister of State	Kirsty McNeill
Minister of State	Stephen Doughty
Parliamentary Under-Secretary of State	Uma Kumaran (also Assistant Whip)
Parliamentary Under-Secretary of State	Chris Elmore (also UK Special Envoy on Preventing Sexual Violence in Conflict)
Parliamentary Under-Secretary of State	The Lord Wood of Anfield
Parliamentary Under-Secretary of State	The Baroness Winterton of Doncaster

Ministry of Defence
Secretary of State for Defence	**Wes Streeting**
Minister of State	Luke Pollard
Minister of State	The Lord Coaker
Parliamentary Under-Secretary of State	Calvin Bailey
Parliamentary Under-Secretary of State	Louise Sandher-Jones

=== Law and order ===
Home Office
Secretary of State for the Home Department	**Shabana Mahmood**
Minister of State (Security Minister) (jointly with Cabinet Office)	Dan Jarvis
Minister of State	Sarah Jones
Minister of State	Anna Turley
Minister of State	The Lord Hanson of Flint
Parliamentary Under-Secretary of State	Satvir Kaur (also Parliamentary Under-Secretary of State (Minister for Equalities))
Parliamentary Under-Secretary of State	The Lord Collins of Highbury
Parliamentary Under-Secretary of State	Jo White

Ministry of Justice
Lord Chancellor and Secretary of State for Justice	**Alex Norris**
Minister of State for Justice	Sarah Sackman
Minister of State for Justice	Catherine McKinnell
Parliamentary Under-Secretary of State	The Lord Lemos
Parliamentary Under-Secretary of State	Alex Davies-Jones
Parliamentary Under-Secretary of State	Jake Richards

Attorney General's Office
Attorney General	**Ellie Reeves**
Solicitor General	Andy Slaughter

Office of the Advocate General for Scotland
HM Advocate General for Scotland	The Baroness Smith of Cluny

=== Economy ===
HM Treasury
Chancellor of the Exchequer	**John Healey**
Chief Secretary to the Treasury	**Emma Reynolds**
Paymaster General; Financial Secretary to the Treasury	James Murray
Economic Secretary to the Treasury	Lucy Rigby
Exchequer Secretary to the Treasury (Minister for Growth)	Daniel Tomlinson
Parliamentary Secretary	Torsten Bell (also Parliamentary Under-Secretary of State in the Department for Work and Pensions)
Parliamentary Secretary	The Lord Pitt-Watson

Department for Business, Innovation, Science and Trade and UK Export Finance
Secretary of State for Business, Innovation, Science and Trade; President of the Board of Trade	**Jonathan Reynolds**

Department for Work and Pensions
Secretary of State for Work and Pensions	**Pat McFadden**
Minister of State	Andrew Western
Minister of State	Sir Stephen Timms
Minister of State	The Baroness Sherlock
Minister of State	The Baroness Smith of Malvern
Parliamentary Under-Secretary of State	Torsten Bell (also Parliamentary Secretary in HM Treasury)
Parliamentary Under-Secretary of State	Lilian Greenwood

=== Social services ===
Department for Education
Secretary of State for Education	**Lucy Powell**
Minister of State	Georgia Gould
Minister of State	The Baroness Smith of Malvern
Minister of State (Minister for Social Security and Disability) (jointly with Department for Work and Pensions)	Sir Stephen Timms
Parliamentary Under-Secretary of State (Minister for Early Education); Parliamentary Under-Secretary of State (Minister for Equalities)	Olivia Bailey
Parliamentary Under-Secretary of State (Minister for Children and Families)	Josh MacAlister
Parliamentary Under-Secretary of State (Minister for Equalities)	Seema Malhotra (also Parliamentary Under-Secretary of State (Indo-Pacific))

Department of Health and Social Care
Secretary of State for Health and Social Care	**Yvette Cooper**
Minister of State for Health (Secondary Care)	Karin Smyth
Minister of State for Care	Dame Diana Johnson
Parliamentary Under-Secretary of State for Women's Health and Mental Health	The Baroness Merron
Parliamentary Under-Secretary of State	Sharon Hodgson
Parliamentary Under-Secretary of State for Health Innovation and Safety	Preet Kaur Gill

=== Environment ===
Department for Environment, Food and Rural Affairs
Secretary of State for Environment, Food and Rural Affairs	**Dame Angela Eagle**
Minister of State (Minister for Food Security and Rural Affairs)	Stephen Morgan
Parliamentary Under-Secretary of State (Minister for Water and Flooding)	Emma Hardy
Parliamentary Under-Secretary of State (Minister for Nature)	Mary Creagh
Parliamentary Under-Secretary of State (Minister for Biosecurity, Borders and Animals)	The Baroness Hayman of Ullock

Department for Energy Security and Net Zero
Secretary of State for Energy Security and Net Zero	**Miatta Fahnbulleh**
Minister of State (Minister for Science, Innovation, Research and Nuclear) (jointly with Department for Science, Innovation and Technology)	The Lord Vallance
Minister of State (Minister for Energy)	Michael Shanks
Minister of State (Minister for Energy Security and Net Zero)	The Lord Whitehead
Parliamentary Under-Secretary of State (Minister for Climate)	Katie White
Parliamentary Under-Secretary of State (Minister for Energy Consumers)	Martin McCluskey
Parliamentary Under-Secretary of State (Minister for Industry) (jointly with Department for Business and Trade)	Chris McDonald

=== Science ===
Department for Science, Innovation and Technology
Minister of State (Minister for Science, Innovation, Research and Nuclear) (jointly with Department for Energy Security and Net Zero)	The Lord Vallance
Minister of State (Minister for Digital Government and Data)	Ian Murray (also Minister for Creative Industries, Media and Arts)
Parliamentary Under-Secretary of State (Minister for Digital Economy)	The Baroness Lloyd of Effra
Parliamentary Under-Secretary of State	James Frith (also Parliamentary Secretary in the Cabinet Office)

=== Culture ===
Department for Culture, Media and Sport
Minister of State (Minister for Creative Industries, Media and Arts)	Ian Murray (also Minister for Digital Government and Data)
Parliamentary Under-Secretary of State (Minister for Sport, Tourism, Civil Society and Youth)	Stephanie Peacock
Parliamentary Under-Secretary of State (Minister for Museums, Heritage and Gambling, and Lords Minister)	The Baroness Twycross

=== Transport ===
Department for Transport
Secretary of State for Transport	**Heidi Alexander**
Minister of State (Minister for Rail)	The Lord Hendy of Richmond Hill
Parliamentary Under-Secretary of State (Minister for Roads and Buses)	Simon Lightwood
Parliamentary Under-Secretary of State (Minister for Local Transport)	Lilian Greenwood (also Junior Lord of the Treasury)
Parliamentary Under-Secretary of State (Minister for Aviation, Maritime and Decarbonisation)	Keir Mather

=== Local and devolved government ===
Ministry of Housing, Communities and Local Government
Secretary of State for Housing, Communities and Local Government	**Angela Rayner**
Minister of State (Minister for Housing and Planning)	**Matthew Pennycook**
Minister of State (Minister for Local Government and Homelessness)	Alison McGovern
Parliamentary Under-Secretary of State (Lords Minister for Housing and Local Government)	The Baroness Taylor of Stevenage
Parliamentary Under-Secretary of State (Minister for Building Safety, Fire and Democracy)	Samantha Dixon
Parliamentary Under-Secretary of State (Minister for Devolution, Local Growth and Communities)	Nesil Caliskan
Parliamentary Under-Secretary of State (Minister for Faith)	The Lord Lemos
Minister for Women and Equalities	**Bridget Phillipson**

Northern Ireland Office
Secretary of State for Northern Ireland	**Sir Chris Bryant** (also Minister of State (Minister for Trade))
Parliamentary Under-Secretary of State	Matthew Patrick

Scotland Office
Secretary of State for Scotland	**Douglas Alexander**
Parliamentary Under-Secretary of State	Kirsty McNeill

Wales Office
Secretary of State for Wales	**Stephen Kinnock**
Parliamentary Under-Secretary of State	Anna McMorrin
Parliamentary Under-Secretary of State	Claire Hughes (also Assistant Whip)

=== Parliament ===
House Leaders
Lord President of the Council; Leader of the House of Commons	**Sir Alan Campbell**
Lord Privy Seal; Leader of the House of Lords	**The Baroness Smith of Basildon**
Deputy Leader of the House of Lords	The Lord Collins of Highbury (also Lord in Waiting)

House of Commons Whips
Parliamentary Secretary to the Treasury (Chief Whip)	**Anneliese Midgley**
Treasurer of HM Household (Deputy Chief Whip)	Sir Mark Tami
Vice Chamberlain of HM Household (Government Whip)	Sir Nic Dakin
Comptroller of HM Household (Government Whip)	Gen Kitchen
Junior Lords of the Treasury (Government Whips)	Christian Wakeford
Junior Lords of the Treasury (Government Whips)	Lilian Greenwood (also Minister for Local Transport)
Junior Lords of the Treasury (Government Whips)	Taiwo Owatemi
Junior Lords of the Treasury (Government Whips)	Deirdre Costigan
Junior Lords of the Treasury (Government Whips)	Jade Botterill
Assistant Whips, House of Commons	
Assistant Whips, House of Commons	Mark Ferguson
Assistant Whips, House of Commons	Imogen Walker
Assistant Whips, House of Commons	Gregor Poynton
Assistant Whips, House of Commons	Claire Hughes (also Parliamentary Under-Secretary of State in the Wales Office)
Assistant Whips, House of Commons	Jake Richards (also Parliamentary Under-Secretary of State for Sentencing, Youth Justice and International)
Assistant Whips, House of Commons	Shaun Davies
Assistant Whips, House of Commons	Emma Foody

House of Lords Whips
Captain of the Honourable Corps of Gentlemen at Arms (Lords Chief Whip)	The Lord Kennedy of Southwark
Captain of the King's Bodyguard of the Yeomen of the Guard (Lords Deputy Chief Whip)	The Baroness Wheeler
Baronesses and Lords in Waiting (Government Whips)	
Baronesses and Lords in Waiting (Government Whips)	The Lord Wilson of Sedgefield
Baronesses and Lords in Waiting (Government Whips)	The Lord Katz
Baronesses and Lords in Waiting (Government Whips)	The Baroness Blake of Leeds
Baronesses and Lords in Waiting (Government Whips)	The Baroness Ramsey of Wall Heath
Baronesses and Lords in Waiting (Government Whips)	The Baroness Curran

== See also ==
- Government of the United Kingdom
- Cabinet of the United Kingdom
- Official Opposition frontbench
- Official Opposition Shadow Cabinet (United Kingdom)
- Frontbench Team of Ed Davey
