= Secretary to the Treasury =

In the United Kingdom, there are several secretaries to the Treasury, who are Treasury ministers nominally acting as secretaries to HM Treasury. The origins of the office are unclear, although it probably originated during Lord Burghley's tenure as Lord Treasurer in the 16th century. The number of secretaries was expanded to two by 1714 at the latest. The Treasury ministers together discharge all the former functions of the Lord Treasurer, which are nowadays nominally vested in the Lords Commissioners of the Treasury. Of the commissioners, only the Second Lord of the Treasury, who is also the chancellor of the Exchequer, is a Treasury minister (the others are the prime minister and the government whips).

The chancellor is the senior Treasury minister, followed by the chief secretary, who also attends Cabinet and has particular responsibilities for public expenditure. In order of seniority, the junior Treasury ministers are: the financial secretary, the economic secretary, the exchequer secretary, and the commercial secretary (currently not in use).

One of the present-day secretaries, the parliamentary secretary to the Treasury, formerly known as the Patronage Secretary, is not a Treasury minister but the government whip in the House of Commons. The office can be seen as a sinecure, allowing the chief whip to draw a government salary, attend Cabinet, and use a Downing Street residence.

== Current secretaries to the Treasury ==
Current Treasury Ministers (as of 20 July 2026)
Minister	Portrait	Office	Portfolio
Emma Reynolds		Chief Secretary to the Treasury	Responsible for public expenditure, including spending reviews.
James Murray		Financial Secretary to the Treasury	Leads the government’s growth agenda and oversees core Treasury business.
Lucy Rigby		Economic Secretary to the Treasury (City Minister)	Responsible for financial services regulation, savings policy and regulation.
Dan Tomlinson		Exchequer Secretary to the Treasury	Responsible for tax policy and administration, customs/VAT, and oversight of HMRC.
Torsten Bell		Pensions Minister	Responsible for economic and monetary policy, including debt and reserves management policy, National Savings and Investment (NS&I), the Office for Budget Responsibility (OBR) and Debt Management Office (DMO)
David Pitt-Watson, Baron Pitt-Watson		Parliamentary Secretary for the Treasury (Note: The roles of Parliamentary Secretary for the Treasury and Parliamentary Secretary to the Treasury are distinct and should not be confused, the former being one or more junior ministers working in the Treasury while the latter is a sinecure position held by the Government Chief Whip)	Supporting the Treasury's role across government and Treasury ministers in their duties, and representing HM Treasury in the House of Lords
Anneliese Midgley		Parliamentary Secretary to the Treasury	Government Chief Whip, though formally a junior minister in the Treasury.

=== Civil Servants ===
From October 2022, the Permanent Secretary to the Treasury - the head of the departmental civil service - is James Bowler. There are two Second Permanent Secretaries: Catherine Little and Jim O'Neill.

== Secretaries to the Treasury ==
=== 1660–1830 ===
- June 1660: Sir Philip Warwick
- May 1667: Sir George Downing, Bt
- October 1671: Sir Robert Howard
- July 1673: Charles Bertie
- March 1679: Henry Guy
- April 1689: William Jephson
- June 1691: Henry Guy
- March 1695: William Lowndes

Year	Senior Secretary	Junior Secretary
11 June 1711	William Lowndes	Thomas Harley
November 1714	William Lowndes	John Taylor
12 October 1715	William Lowndes	Horatio Walpole
April 1717	William Lowndes	Charles Stanhope
April 1721	William Lowndes	Horatio Walpole
January 1724	John Scrope	Horatio Walpole
24 June 1730	John Scrope	Edward Walpole
1 June 1739	John Scrope	Stephen Fox
30 April 1741	John Scrope	Henry Legge
15 July 1742	John Scrope	Henry Furnese
30 November 1742	John Scrope	John Jeffreys
1 May 1746	John Scrope	James West
9 April 1752	James West	Nicholas Hardinge
18 November 1756	Nicholas Hardinge	Samuel Martin
5 July 1757	Nicholas Hardinge	James West
9 April 1758	James West	
31 May 1758	James West	Samuel Martin
29 May 1762	Samuel Martin	Jeremiah Dyson
18 April 1763	Jeremiah Dyson	Charles Jenkinson
24 August 1763	Charles Jenkinson	Thomas Whateley
30 September 1765	William Mellish	Charles Lowndes
18 August 1766	Sir Grey Cooper, Bt	Thomas Bradshaw
16 October 1770	Sir Grey Cooper, Bt	John Robinson
29 March 1782	Henry Strachey	Edward Chamberlain
6 April 1782	Henry Strachey	Richard Burke
15 July 1782	Thomas Orde	George Rose
5 April 1783	Richard Burke	Richard Brinsley Sheridan
27 December 1783	George Rose	Thomas Steele
26 February 1791	George Rose	Charles Long
24 March 1801	John Hiley Addington	Charles Long
9 April 1801	John Hiley Addington	Nicholas Vansittart
8 July 1802	Nicholas Vansittart	John Sargent
21 May 1804	William Huskisson	William Sturges Bourne
10 February 1806	Nicholas Vansittart	John King
2 September 1806	Nicholas Vansittart	William Henry Fremantle
1 April 1807	Hon. Henry Wellesley	William Huskisson
5 April 1809	Charles Arbuthnot	William Huskisson
8 December 1809	Charles Arbuthnot	Richard Wharton
7 January 1814	Charles Arbuthnot	Stephen Rumbold Lushington
7 February 1823	Stephen Rumbold Lushington	John Charles Herries
19 April 1827	Joseph Planta	Thomas Frankland Lewis
28 January 1828	Joseph Planta	George Robert Dawson

=== 1830–present ===
- Chief Secretary to the Treasury (established 1961)
- Financial Secretary to the Treasury (established 1830)
- Economic Secretary to the Treasury (established 1947)
- Exchequer Secretary to the Treasury (established 1996)
- Financial Services Secretary to the Treasury (established 2008, not in use since 2010)
- Commercial Secretary to the Treasury (established 2010, not in use since 2017)

== See also ==
- Lord High Treasurer
