= Burnham ministry =

Government of the United Kingdom from 2026

- Cabinet of the United Kingdom
- 2026–present
- Burnham's cabinet in September 2026
- Date formed: 20 July 2026

People and organisations
- Monarch: Charles III
- Prime Minister: Andy Burnham
- First Secretary of State: Louise Haigh
- No. of ministers: 125 (excluding ministers on maternity leave); 95 MPs, 30 peers; 119 paid, 6 unpaid
- Member party: Labour Party
- Status in legislature: Majority
- Opposition cabinet: Badenoch shadow cabinet
- Opposition party: Conservative Party
- Opposition leader: Kemi Badenoch

History
- Incoming formation: 2026 Labour leadership election
- Legislature term: 2024–present
- Budget: October 2026 budget
- Predecessor: Starmer ministry

The Burnham ministry began on 20 July 2026 when Andy Burnham, despite only having been an MP for one month, was invited by King Charles III to form a government, following the resignation of Keir Starmer after the 2026 Labour Party leadership election.

== Background ==
Following Burnham's appointment as Prime Minister on 20 July 2026, he began to form his cabinet, which first met on 21 July. He completed his ministerial appointments on 23 July. The initial appointments resulted in major cabinet changes, featuring a significant removal of close Starmer allies, while returning and rewarding those contributing to his downfall. Key departures from the previous ministry included Rachel Reeves, who was removed as Chancellor of the Exchequer after reportedly turning down an alternative role, David Lammy, who was dismissed as Deputy Prime Minister and Justice Secretary, Business Secretary Peter Kyle, Housing Secretary Steve Reed, Attorney General Lord Hermer, Chief Secretary to the Prime Minister, Chancellor of the Duchy of Lancaster and Minister for Intergovernmental Affairs Darren Jones, and Science, Innovation and Technology Secretary Liz Kendall, whose department was dissolved. 15 were dismissed from the cabinet, the most in a transition within the same party since Boris Johnson's first cabinet.

Following the major dismissals, Burnham began selecting the senior members of his government, making many high-profile appointments and retentions. John Healey made a surprise return to government as Chancellor of the Exchequer, while Ed Miliband was elevated to Foreign Secretary, a major step up from his former Energy and Net Zero brief. Close ally Louise Haigh was appointed First Secretary of State, Chancellor of the Duchy of Lancaster, and Minister for the Cabinet Office (his de facto Deputy Prime Minister). Angela Rayner returned to government in her previous post of Housing Secretary, Yvette Cooper was reshuffled to become Health Secretary and Wes Streeting re-joined the cabinet with his appointment as Defence Secretary. Rounding out the senior team, Jonathan Reynolds was promoted to the newly expanded brief of Business, Science, Innovation and Trade Secretary, while Labour Deputy Leader Lucy Powell became Education Secretary, Emma Reynolds returned to the Treasury, being appointed as Chief Secretary to the Treasury. Some notable retentions from Starmer's cabinet included Shabana Mahmood as Home Secretary, Pat McFadden as Work and Pensions Secretary, Alan Campbell as Leader of the Commons, Lisa Nandy as Culture Secretary and Heidi Alexander as Transport Secretary.

Burnham's cabinet is the first in history with a majority of female members: 12 of the 23 members of the cabinet are women and 11 (including the prime minister) are men. There are also two female ministers and three male ministers attending cabinet, making a total of 14 male and 14 female ministers at cabinet meetings.

== Cabinet ==
=== July 2026 – present ===
Burnham Cabinet
Post	Portrait	Name	Seat	Term
Cabinet members
Prime Minister,^{[LL]} First Lord of the Treasury, Minister for the Civil Service, Minister for the Union		Andy Burnham	Makerfield	20 July 2026 – present
First Secretary of State, Chancellor of the Duchy of Lancaster, Minister for the Cabinet Office		Louise Haigh	Sheffield Heeley	20 July 2026 – present
Chancellor of the Exchequer		John Healey	Rawmarsh and Conisbrough	20 July 2026 – present
Secretary of State for Foreign, Commonwealth and Development Affairs		Ed Miliband	Doncaster North	20 July 2026 – present
Secretary of State for the Home Department		Shabana Mahmood	Birmingham Ladywood	5 September 2025 – present
Secretary of State for Defence		Wes Streeting	Ilford North	20 July 2026 – present
Secretary of State for Health and Social Care		Yvette Cooper	Pontefract, Castleford and Knottingley	20 July 2026 – present
Lord Chancellor and Secretary of State for Justice		Alex Norris	Nottingham North and Kimberley	20 July 2026 – present
Secretary of State for Education^{[DLL]}		Lucy Powell	Manchester Central	20 July 2026 – present
Secretary of State for Work and Pensions		Pat McFadden	Wolverhampton South East	5 September 2025 – present
Secretary of State for Business, Innovation, Science and Trade; President of the Board of Trade		Jonathan Reynolds	Stalybridge and Hyde	20 July 2026 – present
Secretary of State for Housing, Communities and Local Government		Angela Rayner	Ashton-under-Lyne	20 July 2026 – present
Secretary of State for Transport		Heidi Alexander	Swindon South	29 November 2024 – present
Secretary of State for Energy Security and Net Zero		Miatta Fahnbulleh	Peckham	20 July 2026 – present
Secretary of State for Digital, Culture, Media and Sport		Lisa Nandy	Wigan	5 July 2024 – present
Secretary of State for Environment, Food and Rural Affairs		Dame Angela Eagle	Wallasey	20 July 2026 – present
Secretary of State for Northern Ireland		Sir Chris Bryant	Rhondda and Ogmore	20 July 2026 – present
Secretary of State for Scotland		Douglas Alexander	Lothian East	5 September 2025 – present
Secretary of State for Wales		Stephen Kinnock	Aberafan Maesteg	20 July 2026 – present
Parliamentary Secretary to the Treasury (Chief Whip)		Anneliese Midgley	Knowsley	20 July 2026 – present
Lord Privy Seal, Leader of the House of Lords		Angela Smith, Baroness Smith of Basildon	Life peer	5 July 2024 – present
Lord President of the Council, Leader of the House of Commons		Sir Alan Campbell	Tynemouth	5 September 2025 – present
Minister for Women and Equalities^{[CL]}		Bridget Phillipson	Houghton and Sunderland South	8 July 2024 – present
Also attending Cabinet
Chief Secretary to the Treasury		Emma Reynolds	Wycombe	20 July 2026 – present
Attorney General		Ellie Reeves	Lewisham West and East Dulwich	20 July 2026 – present
Minister of State (Minister for Intergovernmental Relations and European Relations)		Hamish Falconer	Lincoln	20 July 2026 – present
Minister of State (Minister for Artificial Intelligence)		Kanishka Narayan	Vale of Glamorgan	20 July 2026 – present
Minister of State (Minister for Housing and Planning)		Matthew Pennycook	Greenwich and Woolwich	6 July 2024 – present (attending Cabinet since 20 July 2026)

- LL Also elected to the non-ministerial role of Leader of the Labour Party.
- DLL Also elected to the non-ministerial role of Deputy Leader of the Labour Party.
- CL Also appointed to the non-ministerial role of Chair of the Labour Party (paid by the Labour Party).

==== Changes ====
Changes from Keir Starmer's final cabinet.

- David Lammy, Rachel Reeves, Darren Jones, Steve Reed, Peter Kyle, Liz Kendall, Hilary Benn, Jo Stevens, Lord Hermer, Nick Thomas-Symonds and Baroness Chapman were replaced in their cabinet or attending cabinet roles and left government, becoming backbenchers.
- Dan Jarvis, James Murray, Emma Reynolds, Lucy Rigby and Anna Turley left the cabinet but were retained in government as junior ministers.
- Louise Haigh, John Healey, Wes Streeting, Angela Rayner and Lucy Powell returned to government from the backbenches.
- Alex Norris, Miatta Fahnbulleh, Angela Eagle, Chris Bryant, Stephen Kinnock and Anneliese Midgley joined cabinet for the first time.
- Matthew Pennycook (Minister for Housing and Planning) was invited to attend Cabinet, alongside two newly created and cabinet-attending posts: Kanishka Narayan (Minister for Artificial Intelligence) and Hamish Falconer (Minister for Intergovernmental Relations and European Relations)).
- Bridget Phillipson, who was replaced as Secretary of State for Education by Deputy Leader of the Labour Party Lucy Powell, remained as Minister for Women and Equalities, with the role being reconstituted as a full cabinet post and reporting directly to the Prime Minister. Phillipson also was appointed to Anna Turley's former role as Chair of the Labour Party.
- Jonathan Reynolds was promoted to Secretary of State for Business, Innovation, Science and Trade, being replaced in his post as Chief Whip by Anneliese Midgley.
- The Department for Science, Innovation and Technology was abolished, with its functions split between the Department for Business and Trade (renamed the Department for Business, Innovation, Science and Trade) and the Department for Culture, Media and Sport (reverting to its previous name of the Department for Digital, Culture, Media and Sport).
- An Office for the Prime Minister and Cabinet was established within the Cabinet Office to house Number 10 (Prime Minister's Office), Number 10 North, and core Cabinet Office functions.
- The Office for Equality and Opportunity was moved from the Cabinet Office to the Ministry of Housing, Communities and Local Government, with all ministers holding equalities briefs moving from the Department for Education to the Ministry of Housing, Communities and Local Government.

== List of ministers ==
The current list of ministers in the cabinet is as follows:

Member of the House of Commons	Member of the House of Lords
Cabinet members are listed in **bold**
Ministers that attend Cabinet are listed in **bold italics**

=== Prime Minister and Cabinet Office ===
Cabinet Office including Office for the Prime Minister and Cabinet
Post	Incumbent	Term
Prime Minister, First Lord of the Treasury, Minister for the Civil Service, Minister for the Union	**Andy Burnham**	20 July 2026 – present
First Secretary of State, Chancellor of the Duchy of Lancaster, Minister for the Cabinet Office	**Louise Haigh**	20 July 2026 – present
Minister of State (Minister for Artificial Intelligence) (jointly with Department for Business, Innovation, Science and Trade)	**Kanishka Narayan**	20 July 2026 – present
Minister of State (Minister for Intergovernmental Relations and European Relations) (jointly with Foreign, Commonwealth and Development Office)	**Hamish Falconer**	20 July 2026 – present
Minister of State (Security Minister) (jointly with Home Office)	Dan Jarvis	21 July 2026 – present
Parliamentary Secretary in the Cabinet Office	Sally Jameson (also Parliamentary Under-Secretary of State in the Ministry of Housing, Communities and Local Government)	22 July 2026 – present
Parliamentary Secretary in the Cabinet Office	Dan Tomlinson (also Exchequer Secretary to the Treasury)	22 July 2026 – present
Parliamentary Secretary in the Cabinet Office	Mark Ferguson	22 July 2026 – present
Parliamentary Secretary in the Cabinet Office	Fiona Twycross, Baroness Twycross (also Minister for Heritage)	22 July 2026 – present

=== Departments of State ===
Department for Business, Innovation, Science and Trade and UK Export Finance
Post	Incumbent	Term
Secretary of State for Business, Innovation, Science and Trade; President of the Board of Trade	**Jonathan Reynolds**	20 July 2026 – present
Minister of State (Minister for Artificial Intelligence) (jointly with Cabinet Office)	**Kanishka Narayan**	20 July 2026 – present
Minister of State (Minister for Trade)	Anas Sarwar, Baron Sarwar	22 July 2026 – present
Minister of State (Minister for the Future of Work)	Kate Dearden	21 July 2026 – present
Minister of State (Minister for Science, Innovation and Investment) (jointly with Department of Health and Social Care)	Chris McDonald	21 July 2026 – present
Parliamentary Under-Secretary of State (Minister for Space, Cyber and Regulatory Reform) (jointly with Department for Digital, Culture, Media and Sport)	Liz Lloyd, Baroness Lloyd of Effra	22 July 2026 – present
Parliamentary Under-Secretary of State (Minister for Reindustrialisation) (jointly with Department for Energy Security and Net Zero)	Blair McDougall	22 July 2026 – present
Parliamentary Under-Secretary of State (Minister for Small Business and Enterprise)	Sonny Leong, Baron Leong	22 July 2026 – present

Ministry of Defence
Post	Incumbent	Term
Secretary of State for Defence	**Wes Streeting**	20 July 2026 – present
Minister of State (Minister for Defence Readiness and Industry)	Luke Pollard	6 September 2025 – present
Minister of State (Minister for the House of Lords)	Vernon Coaker, Baron Coaker	8 July 2024 – present
Parliamentary Under-Secretary of State (Minister for the Armed Forces)	Louise Sandher-Jones	12 June 2026 – present
Parliamentary Under-Secretary of State (Minister for Veterans and People)	Calvin Bailey	12 June 2026 – present

Department for Digital, Culture, Media and Sport
Post	Incumbent	Term
Secretary of State for Digital, Culture, Media and Sport	**Lisa Nandy** (was Secretary of State for Culture, Media and Sport before 20 July 2026)	5 July 2024 – present
Minister of State (Minister for Creative Industries, Media and Online Safety)	Ian Murray	21 July 2026 – present
Parliamentary Under-Secretary of State (Minister for Heritage)	Fiona Twycross, Baroness Twycross (also Parliamentary Secretary in the Cabinet Office)	22 July 2026 – present
Parliamentary Under-Secretary of State (Minister for Sport, Tourism, Place and Digital Government)	Stephanie Peacock	22 July 2026 – present
Parliamentary Under-Secretary of State (Minister for Youth, Gambling, Digital Inclusion, Civil Society & Loneliness)	Vicky Foxcroft	22 July 2026 – present
Parliamentary Under-Secretary of State (Minister for Arts and Museums)	Ruth Mackenzie, Baroness Mackenzie of Sherwood	22 July 2026 – present
Parliamentary Under-Secretary of State (Minister for Space, Cyber and Regulatory Reform) (jointly with Department for Business, Innovation, Science and Trade)	Liz Lloyd, Baroness Lloyd of Effra	22 July 2026 – present

Department for Education
Post	Incumbent	Term
Secretary of State for Education	**Lucy Powell**	20 July 2026 – present
Minister of State (Minister for School Standards)	Georgia Gould	6 September 2025 – present
Minister of State (Minister for Skills) (jointly with Department for Work and Pensions)	Jacqui Smith, Baroness Smith of Malvern	6 July 2024 – present
Parliamentary Under-Secretary of State (Minister for Early Education)	Paul Waugh	22 July 2026 – present
Parliamentary Under-Secretary of State (Minister for Children and Families)	Josh MacAlister	7 September 2025 – present

Department for Energy Security and Net Zero
Post	Incumbent	Term
Secretary of State for Energy Security and Net Zero	**Miatta Fahnbulleh**	20 July 2026 – present
Minister of State (Minister for Energy)	Michael Shanks	6 September 2025 – present
Minister of State (Minister for Climate Transition)	Katie White	21 July 2026 – present
Parliamentary Under-Secretary of State (Minister for Local Energy and Jobs)	Martin McCluskey	22 July 2026 – present
Parliamentary Under-Secretary of State (Minister for Energy Consumers)	Polly Billington	22 July 2026 – present
Parliamentary Under-Secretary of State (Minister for Reindustrialisation) (jointly with Department for Business, Innovation, Science and Trade)	Blair McDougall	22 July 2026 – present
Parliamentary Under-Secretary of State (Lords Minister)	Margaret Curran, Baroness Curran (unpaid)	22 July 2026 – present

Department for Environment, Food and Rural Affairs
Post	Incumbent	Term
Secretary of State for Environment, Food and Rural Affairs	**Dame Angela Eagle**	20 July 2026 – present
Minister of State (Minister for Water and Flooding)	Emma Hardy	21 July 2026 – present
Parliamentary Under-Secretary of State (Minister for Nature)	Jenny Riddell-Carpenter	22 July 2026 – present
Parliamentary Under-Secretary of State (Minister for Food Security and Rural Affairs)	Stephen Morgan	22 July 2026 – present
Parliamentary Under-Secretary of State (Minister for Biosecurity, Borders and Animals)	Sue Hayman, Baroness Hayman of Ullock	9 July 2024 – present

Foreign, Commonwealth and Development Office
Post	Incumbent	Term
Secretary of State for Foreign, Commonwealth and Development Affairs	**Ed Miliband**	20 July 2026 – present
Minister of State (Minister for Intergovernmental Relations and European Relations) (jointly with Cabinet Office)	**Hamish Falconer**	20 July 2026 – present
Minister of State for International Development	Kirsty McNeill	21 July 2026 – present
Minister of State (Minister for Middle East, North Africa, Afghanistan and Pakistan)	Stephen Doughty	21 July 2026 – present
Parliamentary Under-Secretary of State (Minister for Overseas Territories, Caribbean, Global Tech and AI)	Uma Kumaran (also Assistant Whip) (paid as a whip)	22 July 2026 – present
Parliamentary Under-Secretary of State (Minister for the Americas, Multilateral and Human Rights)	Chris Elmore	22 July 2026 – present
Parliamentary Under-Secretary of State (Minister for Europe, Eastern Europe, International Security and Growth)	Stewart Wood, Baron Wood of Anfield	23 July 2026 – present
Parliamentary Under-Secretary of State (Minister for Indo-Pacific)	Rosie Winterton, Baroness Winterton of Doncaster	23 July 2026 – present

Department of Health and Social Care
Post	Incumbent	Term
Secretary of State for Health and Social Care	**Yvette Cooper**	20 July 2026 – present
Minister of State (Minister for Public Health and Patient Safety)	Dame Diana Johnson	21 July 2026 – present
Minister of State for Health (Secondary Care)	Karin Smyth	8 July 2024 – present
Minister of State (Minister for Social Care and Mental Health)	Alison McGovern	22 July 2026 – present
Minister of State (Minister for Science, Innovation and Investment) (jointly with Department for Business, Innovation, Science and Trade)	Chris McDonald	21 July 2026 – present
Parliamentary Under-Secretary of State (Minister for Health Innovation)	James Frith	22 July 2026 – present
Parliamentary Under-Secretary of State (Minister for Women's Health and Maternity)	Gillian Merron, Baroness Merron	22 July 2026 – present

Home Office
Post	Incumbent	Term
Secretary of State for the Home Department	**Shabana Mahmood**	5 September 2025 – present
Minister of State (Security Minister) (jointly with Cabinet Office)	Dan Jarvis	21 July 2026 – present
Minister of State (Minister for Policing and Crime)	Sarah Jones	6 September 2025 – present
Minister of State (Lords Minister)	David Hanson, Baron Hanson of Flint	9 July 2024 – present
Minister of State (Minister for Border Security and Asylum)	Anna Turley	21 July 2026 – present
Parliamentary Under-Secretary of State (Minister for Migration and Citizenship)	Jo White	22 July 2026 – present
Parliamentary Under-Secretary of State (Minister for Safeguarding and Violence Against Women and Girls)	Satvir Kaur (also Minister for Equalities)	22 July 2026 – present
Parliamentary Under-Secretary of State (Lords Minister)	Ray Collins, Baron Collins of Highbury (also Minister for Equalities, also Deputy Leader of the House of Lords)	22 July 2026 – present

Ministry of Housing, Communities and Local Government
Post	Incumbent	Term
Secretary of State for Housing, Communities and Local Government	**Angela Rayner**	20 July 2026 – present
Minister of State (Minister for Housing and Planning)	**Matthew Pennycook** (attending Cabinet from 20 July 2026)	6 July 2024 – present
Minister of State (Minister for Homelessness, Democracy, Communities and Faith)	Florence Eshalomi	21 July 2026 – present
Parliamentary Under-Secretary of State	Sally Jameson (also Parliamentary Secretary in the Cabinet Office)	22 July 2026 – present
Parliamentary Under-Secretary of State (Minister for Local Government, Devolution and Regional Growth)	Jim McMahon	22 July 2026 – present
Parliamentary Under-Secretary of State (Minister for Housing and Local Government)	Sharon Taylor, Baroness Taylor of Stevenage	9 July 2024 – present
Parliamentary Under-Secretary of State (Minister for Building Safety, Fire and Resilience)	Judith Blake, Baroness Blake of Leeds (also Baroness in Waiting) (paid as a whip)	22 July 2026 – present
Office for Equality and Opportunity
Minister for Women and Equalities (reporting to the Prime Minister)	**Bridget Phillipson** (unpaid)	8 July 2024 – present
Minister of State (Minister for Equalities)	Sir Stephen Timms (also Minister for Social Security and Disability)	22 July 2026 – present
Parliamentary Under-Secretary of State (Minister for Equalities)	Ray Collins, Baron Collins of Highbury (also Lords Minister in the Home Office, also Deputy Leader of the House of Lords)	22 July 2026 – present
Parliamentary Under-Secretary of State (Minister for Equalities)	Satvir Kaur (also Minister for Safeguarding and Violence Against Women and Girls)	22 July 2026 – present
Parliamentary Under-Secretary of State (Minister for Equalities)	Simon Lightwood (also Minister for Buses and Local Transport)	22 July 2026 – present

Ministry of Justice
Post	Incumbent	Term
Lord Chancellor and Secretary of State for Justice	**Alex Norris**	20 July 2026 – present
Minister of State (Minister for Prisons, Probation and Reducing Reoffending)	Catherine McKinnell	21 July 2026 – present
Minister of State (Minister for Courts and Legal Services)	Sarah Sackman	2 December 2024 – present
Parliamentary Under-Secretary of State and Lords Minister	Gerard Lemos, Baron Lemos	22 July 2026 – present
Parliamentary Under-Secretary of State (Minister for Victims, Violence Against Women and Girls (VAWG) and International Justice)	Alex Davies-Jones	22 July 2026 – present
Parliamentary Under-Secretary of State (Minister for Sentencing, Human Rights and Technology)	Jake Richards	22 July 2026 – present

Northern Ireland Office
Post	Incumbent	Term
Secretary of State for Northern Ireland	**Sir Chris Bryant**	20 July 2026 – present
Parliamentary Under-Secretary of State in the Northern Ireland Office	Sarah Owen	22 July 2026 – present
Parliamentary Under-Secretary of State in the Northern Ireland Office	Ruth Anderson, Baroness Anderson of Stoke-on-Trent (also Captain of The King’s Bodyguard of the Yeoman of the Guard) (paid as a whip)	22 July 2026 – present

Scotland Office
Post	Incumbent	Term
Secretary of State for Scotland	**Douglas Alexander**	5 September 2025 – present
Parliamentary Under-Secretary of State in the Scotland Office	Melanie Ward	22 July 2026 – present

Department for Transport
Post	Incumbent	Term
Secretary of State for Transport	**Heidi Alexander**	29 November 2024 – present
Minister of State (Minister for Rail)	Peter Hendy, Baron Hendy of Richmond Hill (unpaid)	8 July 2024 – present
Parliamentary Under-Secretary of State (Minister for Roads)	Justin Madders	22 July 2026 – present
Parliamentary Under-Secretary of State (Minister for Buses and Local Transport)	Simon Lightwood (also Minister for Equalities)	22 July 2026 – present
Parliamentary Under-Secretary of State (Minister for Aviation, Maritime and Logistics)	Keir Mather	7 September 2025 – present

HM Treasury
Post	Incumbent	Term
Chancellor of the Exchequer (Second Lord of the Treasury)	**John Healey**	20 July 2026 – present
Chief Secretary to the Treasury	**Emma Reynolds**	20 July 2026 – present
Financial Secretary to the Treasury, Paymaster General	James Murray	21 July 2026 – present
Economic Secretary to the Treasury (Minister of State)	Lucy Rigby	21 July 2026 – present
Exchequer Secretary to the Treasury (Minister for Growth) (Parliamentary Secretary)	Dan Tomlinson (also Parliamentary Secretary in the Cabinet Office)	1 September 2025 – present
Parliamentary Secretary (Pensions Minister) (jointly with Department for Work and Pensions)	Torsten Bell	14 January 2025 – present
Parliamentary Secretary in the Treasury	David Pitt-Watson, Baron Pitt-Watson (unpaid)	22 July 2026 – present

Wales Office
Post	Incumbent	Term
Secretary of State for Wales	**Stephen Kinnock**	20 July 2026 – present
Parliamentary Under-Secretary of State in the Wales Office	Anna McMorrin	7 September 2025 – present
Parliamentary Under-Secretary of State in the Wales Office	Claire Hughes (also Junior Lord of the Treasury) (paid as a whip)	16 September 2025 – present

Department for Work and Pensions
Post	Incumbent	Term
Secretary of State for Work and Pensions	**Pat McFadden**	5 September 2025 – present
Minister of State (Minister for Social Security and Disability)	Sir Stephen Timms (also Minister for Equalities)	8 July 2024 – present
Minister of State (Minister for Skills) (jointly with Department for Education)	Jacqui Smith, Baroness Smith of Malvern	6 September 2025 – present
Minister of State (Minister for Lords)	Maeve Sherlock, Baroness Sherlock	17 December 2024 – present
Minister of State (Minister for Employment)	Andrew Western	21 July 2026 – present
Parliamentary Under-Secretary of State (Minister for Innovation, Fraud and Data)	Lilian Greenwood	22 July 2026 – present
Parliamentary Under-Secretary of State (Pensions Minister) (jointly with HM Treasury)	Torsten Bell	14 January 2025 – present

=== Law officers ===
Attorney General's Office
Post	Incumbent	Term
Attorney General (Advocate General for Northern Ireland)	**Ellie Reeves**	20 July 2026 – present
Solicitor General	Andy Slaughter	21 July 2026 – present

Office of the Advocate General for Scotland
Post	Incumbent	Term
HM Advocate General for Scotland	Catherine Smith, Baroness Smith of Cluny	29 August 2024 – present

=== Parliament ===
House Leaders
Post	Incumbent	Term
Lord President of the Council, Leader of the House of Commons	**Sir Alan Campbell**	5 September 2025 – present
Lord Privy Seal, Leader of the House of Lords	**Angela Smith, Baroness Smith of Basildon**	5 July 2024 – present
Deputy Leader of the House of Lords	Ray Collins, Baron Collins of Highbury (also Lords Minister in the Home Office, also Minister for Equalities)	9 July 2024 – present

House of Commons Whips
Post	Incumbent	Term
Parliamentary Secretary to the Treasury; Government Chief Whip	**Anneliese Midgley**	20 July 2026 – present
Treasurer of HM Household; Deputy Government Chief Whip	Sir Mark Tami	10 July 2024 – present
Comptroller of HM Household; Senior Government Whip	Gen Kitchen	12 May 2026 – present
Vice Chamberlain of HM Household; Senior Government Whip	Emma Foody	21 July 2026 – present
Junior Lords of the Treasury; Government Whips	Christian Wakeford	7 September 2025 – present
Junior Lords of the Treasury; Government Whips	Jade Botterill	12 June 2026 – present
Junior Lords of the Treasury; Government Whips	Claire Hughes (also Parliamentary Under-Secretary of State in the Wales Office)	22 July 2026 – present
Junior Lords of the Treasury; Government Whips	Gregor Poynton	22 July 2026 – present
Junior Lords of the Treasury; Government Whips	Shaun Davies	22 July 2026 – present
Assistant Whips; Assistant Government Whips	Uma Kumaran (also Minister for Overseas Territories, Caribbean, Global Tech and AI)	22 July 2026 – present
Assistant Whips; Assistant Government Whips	Laurence Turner	22 July 2026 – present
Assistant Whips; Assistant Government Whips	Rachel Hopkins	22 July 2026 – present
Assistant Whips; Assistant Government Whips	Harpreet Uppal	22 July 2026 – present
Assistant Whips; Assistant Government Whips	Michael Wheeler	22 July 2026 – present
Assistant Whips; Assistant Government Whips	Liam Conlon	22 July 2026 – present
Assistant Whips; Assistant Government Whips	Sarah Coombes	22 July 2026 – present

House of Lords Whips
Post	Incumbent	Term
Captain of the Honourable Corps of Gentlemen-at-Arms; Government Chief Whip	Roy Kennedy, Baron Kennedy of Southwark	10 July 2024 – present
Captain of the King's Bodyguard of the Yeomen of the Guard; Deputy Government Chief Whip	Ruth Anderson, Baroness Anderson of Stoke-on-Trent (also Parliamentary Under-Secretary of State in the Northern Ireland Office)	22 July 2026 – present
Lords and Baronesses in Waiting; Government Whips	Judith Blake, Baroness Blake of Leeds (also Minister for Building Safety, Fire and Resilience)	11 July 2024 – present
Lords and Baronesses in Waiting; Government Whips	Phil Wilson, Baron Wilson of Sedgefield (unpaid)	10 February 2025 – present
Lords and Baronesses in Waiting; Government Whips	Mike Katz, Baron Katz	11 April 2025 – present
Lords and Baronesses in Waiting; Government Whips	Jane Ramsey, Baroness Ramsey of Wall Heath	12 June 2026 – present
Lords and Baronesses in Waiting; Government Whips	Sophy Antrobus, Baroness Antrobus	22 July 2026 – present
Lords and Baronesses in Waiting; Government Whips	Brenda Dacres, Baroness Dacres of Lewisham	22 July 2026 – present
Lords and Baronesses in Waiting; Government Whips	Sara Hyde, Baroness Hyde of Bemerton (unpaid)	22 July 2026 – present

== Non-ministerial appointments ==
=== Parliamentary Private Secretaries ===
On 27 July 2026, an updated Parliamentary Private Secretary (PPS) list was issued.

Post	Incumbent	Term
10 Downing Street (Prime Minister's Office)
Parliamentary Private Secretary to the Prime Minister	Sir Nic Dakin	27 July 2026 – present
Parliamentary Private Secretary to the Prime Minister	David Baines	27 July 2026 – present
Parliamentary Private Secretary to the Prime Minister	Jo Platt	27 July 2026 – present
Cabinet Office
Parliamentary Private Secretary to the Cabinet Office	Alan Gemmell	27 July 2026 – present
Parliamentary Private Secretary to the Cabinet Office	Beccy Cooper	27 July 2026 – present
Parliamentary Private Secretary to the Cabinet Office	Natasha Irons	27 July 2026 – present
Department for Business, Innovation, Science and Trade
Parliamentary Private Secretary to the Department for Business, Innovation, Science and Trade	Marie Tidball	11 September 2025 – present
Parliamentary Private Secretary to the Department for Business, Innovation, Science and Trade	Deirdre Costigan	27 July 2026 – present
Parliamentary Private Secretary to the Department for Business, Innovation, Science and Trade	Baggy Shanker	27 July 2026 – present
Ministry of Defence
Parliamentary Private Secretary to the Ministry of Defence	Gordon McKee	27 July 2026 – present
Parliamentary Private Secretary to the Ministry of Defence	Steve Race	27 July 2026 – present
Parliamentary Private Secretary to the Ministry of Defence	Rosie Wrighting	27 July 2026 – present
Department for Digital, Culture, Media and Sport
Parliamentary Private Secretary to the Department for Digital, Culture, Media and Sport	Jack Abbott	11 September 2025 – present
Parliamentary Private Secretary to the Department for Digital, Culture, Media and Sport	Lola McEvoy	11 September 2025 – present
Parliamentary Private Secretary to the Department for Digital, Culture, Media and Sport	Matthew Patrick	27 July 2026 – present
Department for Education
Parliamentary Private Secretary to the Department for Education	Elsie Blundell	27 July 2026 – present
Parliamentary Private Secretary to the Department for Education	Adam Jogee	27 July 2026 – present
Parliamentary Private Secretary to the Department for Education	Sarah Smith	27 July 2026 – present
Department for Energy Security and Net Zero
Parliamentary Private Secretary to the Department for Energy Security and Net Zero	Tom Hayes	27 July 2026 – present
Parliamentary Private Secretary to the Department for Energy Security and Net Zero	Jeevun Sandher	27 July 2026 – present
Parliamentary Private Secretary to the Department for Energy Security and Net Zero	Steve Witherden	27 July 2026 – present
Department for Environment, Food and Rural Affairs
Parliamentary Private Secretary to the Department for Environment, Food and Rural Affairs	Jayne Kirkham	11 May 2026 – present
Parliamentary Private Secretary to the Department for Environment, Food and Rural Affairs	Lee Pitcher	27 July 2026 – present
Foreign, Commonwealth and Development Office
Parliamentary Private Secretary to the Foreign, Commonwealth and Development Office	Anna Gelderd	27 July 2026 – present
Parliamentary Private Secretary to the Foreign, Commonwealth and Development Office	Laura Kyrke-Smith	27 July 2026 – present
Parliamentary Private Secretary to the Foreign, Commonwealth and Development Office	Chris Murray	27 July 2026 – present
Department of Health and Social Care
Parliamentary Private Secretary to the Department of Health and Social Care	David Burton-Sampson	11 May 2026 – present
Parliamentary Private Secretary to the Department of Health and Social Care	Catherine Atkinson	27 July 2026 – present
Parliamentary Private Secretary to the Department of Health and Social Care	Sonia Kumar	27 July 2026 – present
Home Office
Parliamentary Private Secretary to the Home Office	Michael Payne	11 May 2026 – present
Parliamentary Private Secretary to the Home Office	Adam Thompson	27 July 2026 – present
Parliamentary Private Secretary to the Home Office	Chris Vince	27 July 2026 – present
Ministry of Housing, Communities and Local Government
Parliamentary Private Secretary to the Ministry of Housing, Communities and Local Government	Olivia Blake	27 July 2026 – present
Parliamentary Private Secretary to the Ministry of Housing, Communities and Local Government	Luke Charters	27 July 2026 – present
Parliamentary Private Secretary to the Ministry of Housing, Communities and Local Government	Kirith Entwistle	27 July 2026 – present
Ministry of Justice
Parliamentary Private Secretary to the Ministry of Justice	Joe Powell	11 September 2025 – present
Parliamentary Private Secretary to the Ministry of Justice	Linsey Farnsworth	11 May 2026 – present
Parliamentary Private Secretary to the Ministry of Justice	Connor Rand	27 July 2026 – present
Northern Ireland Office
Parliamentary Private Secretary to the Northern Ireland Office	Pam Cox	27 July 2026 – present
Parliamentary Private Secretary to the Northern Ireland Office	Pamela Nash	27 July 2026 – present
Scotland Office
Parliamentary Private Secretary to the Scotland Office	Frank McNally	11 September 2025 – present
Parliamentary Private Secretary to the Scotland Office	Alison Taylor	11 September 2025 – present
Department for Transport
Parliamentary Private Secretary to the Department for Transport	Amanda Martin	27 July 2026 – present
Parliamentary Private Secretary to the Department for Transport	Luke Murphy	27 July 2026 – present
Parliamentary Private Secretary to the Department for Transport	Connor Naismith	27 July 2026 – present
HM Treasury
Parliamentary Private Secretary to HM Treasury	Alistair Strathern	19 July 2024 – present
Parliamentary Private Secretary to HM Treasury	John Grady	27 July 2026 – present
Parliamentary Private Secretary to HM Treasury	Yuan Yang	27 July 2026 – present
Wales Office
Parliamentary Private Secretary to the Wales Office	Becky Gittins	19 July 2024 – present
Department for Work and Pensions
Parliamentary Private Secretary to the Department for Work and Pensions	David Pinto-Duschinsky	November 2025 – present
Parliamentary Private Secretary to the Department for Work and Pensions	Tim Roca	11 May 2026 – present
Parliamentary Private Secretary to the Department for Work and Pensions	Elaine Stewart	20 May 2026 – present
Leader of the House of Commons
Parliamentary Private Secretary to the Leader of the House of Commons	Amanda Hack	27 July 2026 – present
Leader of the House of Lords
Parliamentary Private Secretary to the Leader of the House of Lords	Matt Rodda	27 July 2026 – present
Office for Equality and Opportunity
Parliamentary Private Secretary to the Office for Equality and Opportunity	Callum Anderson	27 July 2026 – present
Parliamentary Private Secretary to the Office for Equality and Opportunity	Alice Macdonald	27 July 2026 – present
Attorney General's Office
Parliamentary Private Secretary to the Attorney General's Office	Kevin Bonavia	5 December 2024 – present
Parliamentary Private Secretary to the Attorney General's Office	Alex McIntyre	27 July 2026 – present
Other
Parliamentary Private Secretary to Kanishka Narayan	Lauren Sullivan	27 July 2026 – present
Parliamentary Private Secretary to Hamish Falconer	Oliver Ryan	27 July 2026 – present
Parliamentary Private Secretary to Matthew Pennycook	Mary Kelly Foy	27 July 2026 – present

=== Prime Minister's Office ===
Office	Incumbent	Term
Downing Street Chief of Staff	James Purnell	20 July 2026 – present
Deputy Chief of Staff (Number 10 North)	Caroline Simpson	20 July 2026 – present
Deputy Chief of Staff	Alison Phillips	20 July 2026 – present
Director of Political Strategy	Matthew McGregor	20 July 2026 – present
Political Director to the Prime Minister	Hayden Munro	20 July 2026 – present
Director of Policy	Graeme Cooke	20 July 2026 – present
Director of Communications	Sarah Brown	20 July 2026 – present
Press Secretary	John Stevens	20 July 2026 – present

== Media analysis ==
Media analysis of Burnham's initial appointments to his cabinet on 20 July 2026 noted the removal of individuals seen as Starmer loyalists.

BBC News' political editor Chris Mason called it a "pretty significant cull of the ministers closest to and most loyal to Keir Starmer".

Sky News called it a "purge of the Starmerites". Sky News' political editor Beth Rigby said "there was quite a brutal cull of all Starmer loyalists. [...] The only person that survived in that cabinet that hadn't made it known that they would like Keir Starmer to set out a timetable for [his] departure is Pat McFadden", McFadden having been kept by Burnham as his Secretary of State for Work and Pensions. Rigby did note that Burnham "kept a lot of cabinet ministers in position. Burnham might have shuffled the pack a bit, but he's not completely doing away with the Starmer regime", but also said that "all of the other cabinet ministers that are still in the cabinet, in maybe different jobs, but are still there, were people that let it be known that they thought that Keir Starmer's time was up, that's Ed Miliband, Yvette Cooper, John Healey, and Shabana Mahmood."

Those named as sacked Starmer loyalists included Darren Jones, David Lammy, Peter Kyle, Lord Hermer, Steve Reed, and Rachel Reeves, although in Reeves' case, Chris Mason reported that he was told Reeves was offered a cabinet post but turned it down, with The Guardian reporting that the position she turned down was that of Defence Secretary, Reeves choosing to return to the backbenches, and the role going to Wes Streeting. Mason additionally posed the question of how vocally the departed Starmerites would criticise the new government from the backbenches as it set out its programme.

Commentary also examined the ideological composition of the new cabinet. Tribune wrote that Burnham's appointments leant further towards the party's soft left than Starmer's cabinet, with Starmer's core supporters largely swept aside while Ed Miliband, Louise Haigh, Miatta Fahnbulleh and Angela Rayner took prominent posts, but cautioned that the result was "a potentially uneasy coalition" between the soft left and the Labour right. Analysis for Left Foot Forward highlighted the rehabilitation of Rayner and Haigh, both of whom had been forced to resign from Starmer's government, describing Rayner as "a political heavyweight" whose housing brief includes devolution, a core focus of Burnham's government, and suggested that Fahnbulleh's appointment signalled continuity with the previous government's net zero agenda; it also questioned whether the overall composition, which retained many of the same ministers, was overly cautious.

The junior appointments announced on 21–23 July also attracted comment, particularly the decision to give a life peerage and a ministerial post to Anas Sarwar, who had led Scottish Labour to its worst Holyrood defeat since devolution at the May 2026 election, and who had been the first senior Labour figure to publicly call for Starmer's resignation. LBC reported that Sarwar had rejected suggestions during the Holyrood campaign that he would accept a seat in the Lords if he failed to become First Minister, and quoted a Labour Party source describing the appointment as "falling upwards as an extreme sport". The Spectator similarly argued that the appointment showed Burnham was prepared to reward "those who've enabled him one way or the other".

== Notes ==
Preceded by Starmer ministry	Government of the United Kingdom from 2026	Incumbent
