= HM Treasury =

Ministerial department of the UK Government

Coordinates: 51°30′06.1″N 0°07′40.3″W

His Majesty's Treasury

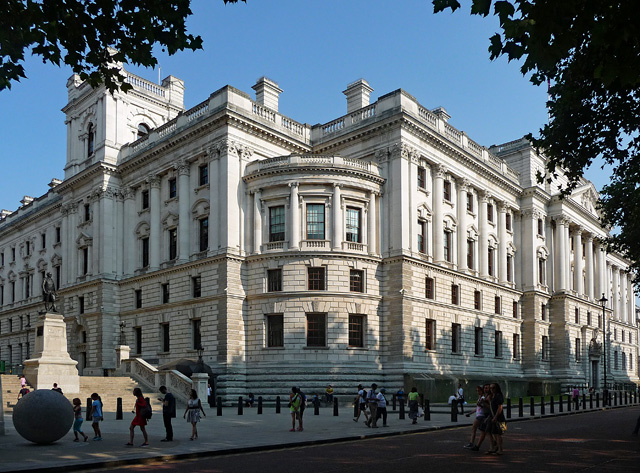
- 1 Horse Guards Road in Westminster, London
- Abbreviation: HMT
- Headquarters: 1 Horse Guards Road
- First Lord of the Treasury: Andy Burnham
- Chancellor of the Exchequer: John Healey
- Website: gov.uk/hm-treasury

His Majesty's Treasury (often shortened to HM Treasury, the Treasury or HMT) is the Government of the United Kingdom’s economic and finance ministry, managing the United Kingdom's public spending and setting its economic policy.

== History ==
Anglo-Saxon governments were skilled in collecting, auditing, and managing their cash revenues. However, there is no evidence of a distinct administrative department. Royal treasures were kept at Winchester, but the crown's wealth was likely kept more flexibly. For example, Edward the Confessor kept some treasure at his palace in Westminster.

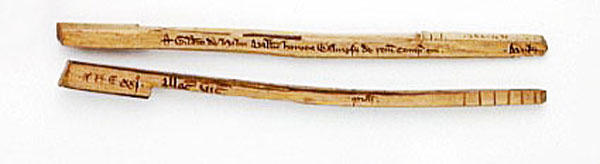
Wooden tally sticks used by the Normans as receipts for money.

The first signs of an administrative department arrive with the Normans. Following the 1066 Norman Conquest, the Exchequer was an event held twice a year, at Easter and Michaelmas. The purpose of these meetings was to make judgements about the collection and usage of the royal treasury. These events were separate from the royal treasury, which stored the royal wealth. The earliest known official of the treasury was Henry the Treasurer. It is likely that Henry the Treasurer partook in the Exchequer events. The name Exchequer came from the chequered cloth that was spread over the counting‐table at these events. By 1154, the Exchequer was a fully-fledged administrative institution based in Westminster. The royal treasury became part of the Lower Exchequer, whilst the twice-yearly meetings formed the Upper Exchequer.

By the 1400s, the significance of the Exchequer was undermined. Much of its administrative and treasury functions were handled personally by Edward IV. This trend continued. Henry VII would personally check, sign, and draft the accounts of the Crown. By the early 1500s, this situation was reversed by Thomas Cromwell. Authority was restored to the Exchequer, and four new government departments were created to handle the state finances. In 1554, these new departments were merged with the Exchequer. However by the early 1600s, under James I, debts mounted and the treasury reserves began to dwindle. In an attempt to control the spiralling debt, Treasurer Lionel Cranfield briefly imposed strict control over spending on the Crown. This would be the first attempt by a Treasurer to impose control over the sovereign. He was later impeached under the guise of corruption.

All Treasurers, if they do good service to their masters, must be generally hated.

— James I of England

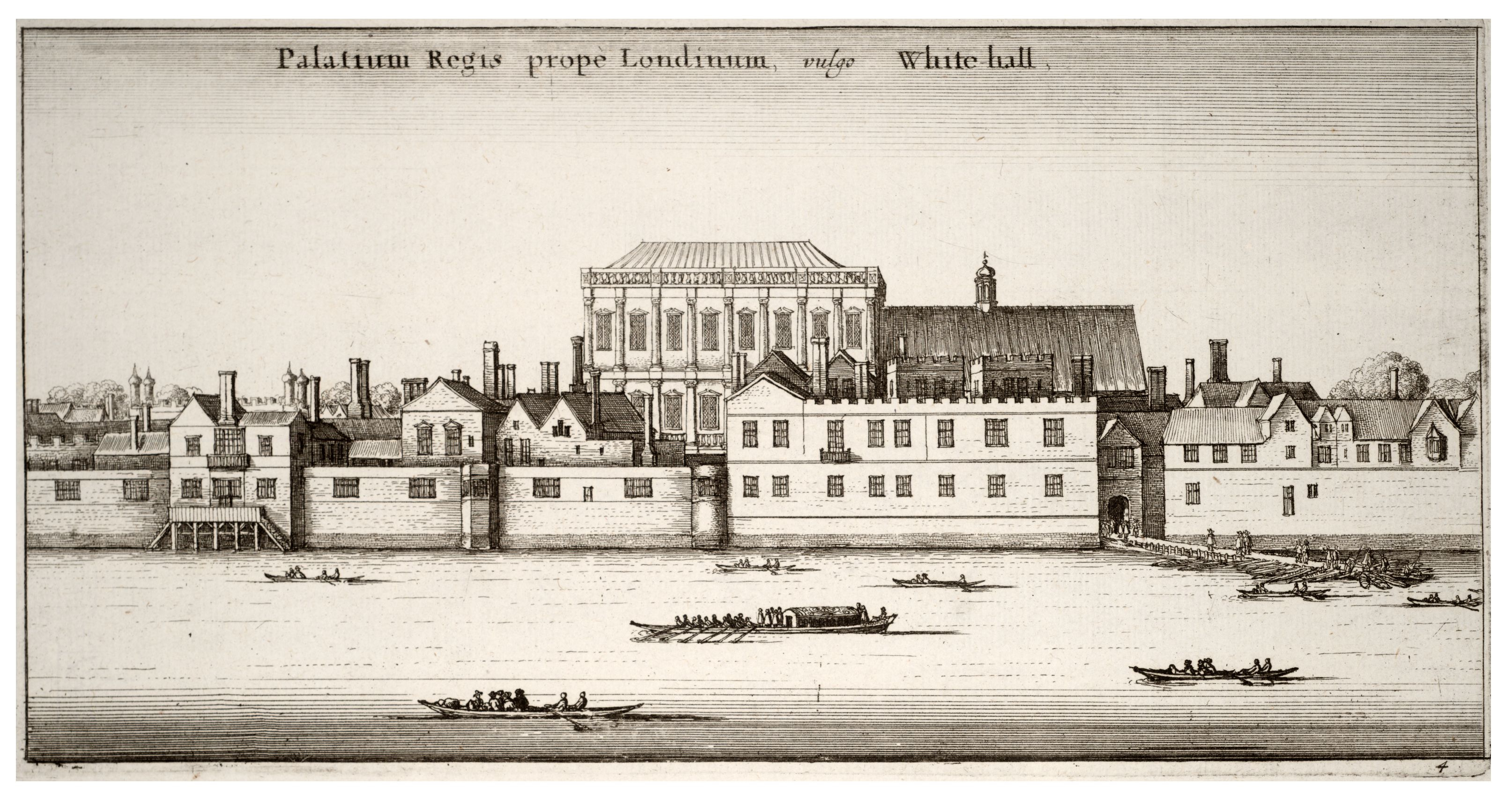
Whitehall Palace seen from the Thames in the mid-1600s.

In the 1640s, the English Civil War broke out. The Exchequer collapsed and finance fell to ad hoc Parliamentary and Royal committees. In 1654, Oliver Cromwell re-opened the Exchequer but left its medieval structure intact. At the 1660 Stuart Restoration, a Lord Treasurer resumed charge, but Parliament won a permanent role in the treasury. Thus, the Treasury was caught between its sovereign-court origins and Parliament's growing authority. Parliament had promised King Charles II £1.2m per year. However, Charles was unable to extract such funds due to the poor financial state of the country. In 1667, without consulting Parliament, Charles decided to replace the Lord Treasurer with a small board of officials. He wanted the "rougher hands of younger, more energetic men to wrest control of the country's finances." The Treasury would now be run not by a single person, but by a board. One notable member was Sir George Downing, who brought lessons from Dutch finance to England. Although England still lagged behind the Dutch in trade, its economy was growing rapidly. The board ended the practice of tax farming (selling the right to tax citizens to third parties) in favour of collecting the taxes directly. This led to an increase in tax revenue and an expansion of the Treasury's staff.

However, due to heavy naval spending in the Anglo–Dutch wars, government debt ballooned. King Charles II halted all debt repayments, in what would become known as the Stop of the Exchequer. This substantially undermined trust in the government's finances. In response, Parliament began tightly controlling how government money was spent. That control vanished in 1685, when Parliament gave James II nearly £2 million a year with no restrictions. After the Glorious Revolution of 1688, the new king, William III, was deliberately kept short of permanent income so that he remained dependent on Parliament. The revolution also led to the development of new financial tools like the Bank of England, the Land Tax, and government bonds. The new government made reforms to the Treasury too. Henry Guy was a Member of Parliament as well as a Treasury Secretary. However, he was later disgraced for having taken a bribe. New rules were created to prevent all office-holders from sitting in the Commons. This effectively created a divorce between civil servants and the Commons. By Queen Anne's death in 1714, the Treasury operated independently from the monarch, and could shape its own direction.

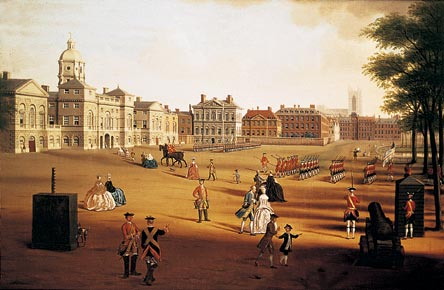
Kent's Treasury is the squared stone building in the middle.

At the beginning of the 1700s, the Treasury held power in some areas but lacked it in others. It held significant power in tax collection. 17,000 civil servants gathered taxes for the government. Parliament would allow the Treasury to handle day-to-day management of tax collection. However, the Treasury rarely questioned government spending decisions. In 1736, a new Treasury building was commissioned. The new building would be physically connected to No. 10 via passageways. The Treasury was now firmly under the control of Parliament.

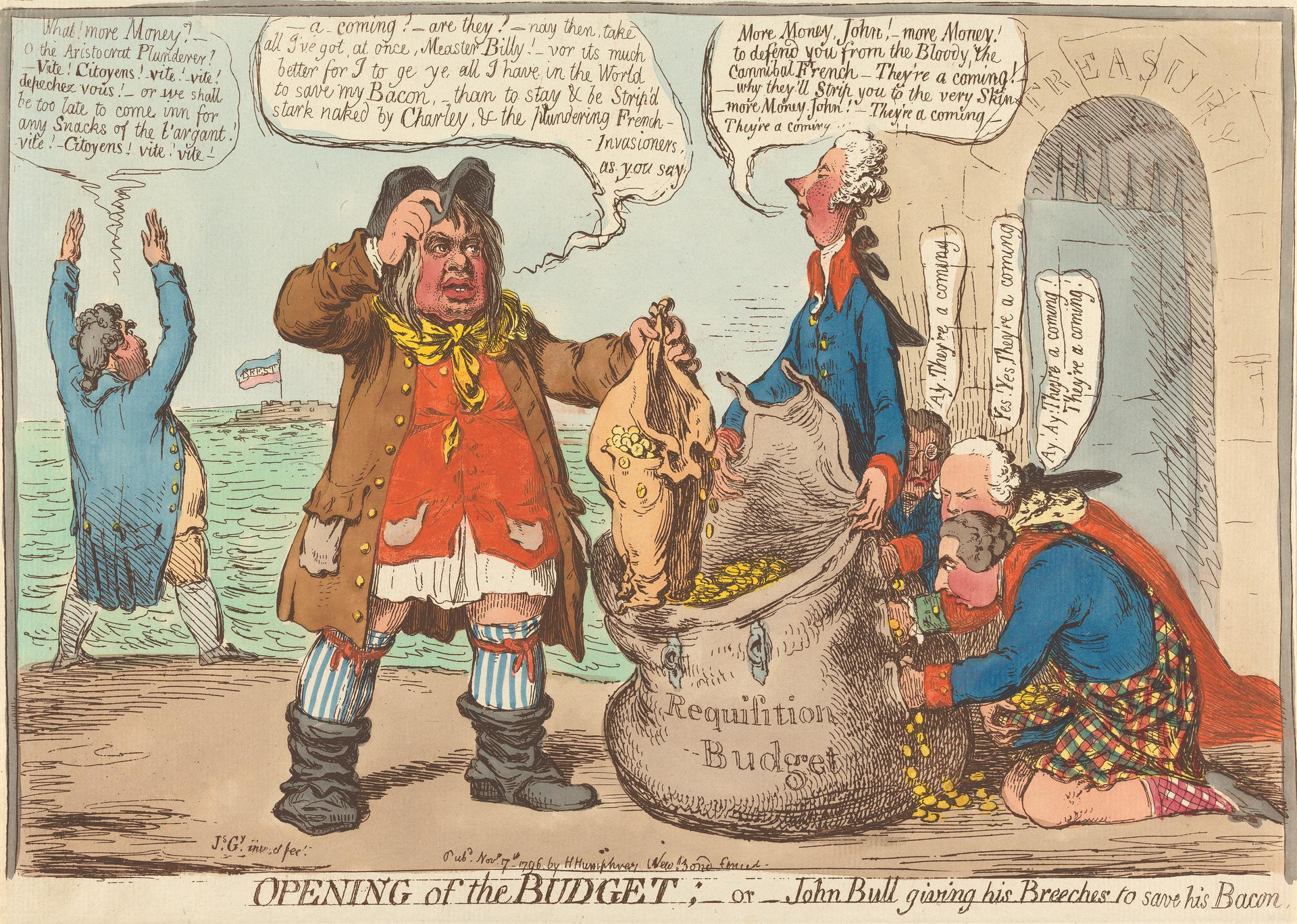
A satirical image depicting the 'Opening of the Budget'

The term budget emerged during this period. It originally meant a small pouch in French (bougette). In a pamphlet in 1733, Sir Robert Walpole is depicted satirically as a quack doctor opening his bag (or bougette) of tricks. The joke stuck, and the term shifted from meaning the container to meaning the financial plan itself.

The power of the Treasury would increase in the late 1700s. The Civil List was the main way Parliament funded the monarch's household budget. By the late 1770s, King George III had accumulated considerable debt. By 1782, Parliament increased the Civil List to £900,000. For the first time, it also demanded detailed scrutiny of Civil List accounts. This was a significant change. The Sovereign's own expenditure would now be scrutinised by the Treasury.

In 1776, the American Declaration of Independence was signed. Some blame the Treasury for the rebellion. At the time, the Treasury had more officers in America than any other department. Additionally, after the Seven Years' War in Europe, government debt had soared. This pushed the Treasury to tighten customs, change pay incentives, and lower duties to curb smuggling. In 1767, Chancellor Charles Townshend, introduced the tax legislation which would ultimately ignite the rebellion. However, others emphasise that the Treasury acted alongside the Board of Trade, the Privy Council, Parliament and other government bodies.

In the 1800s, the Treasury became the government's hard brake. The Treasury relied on the 'power of the purse' to enforce Gladstone's economic restraint. This led to constant clashes with the other departments. The Treasury's control would deepen when the Exchequers of the Great Britain and Ireland were consolidated in 1817. Parliament had complete control of government finances, and the Treasury emerged as the centre of financial discipline.

In the 1850s, a shift in the staffing of the Treasury occurred. The Northcote–Trevelyan Report (1854) set the stage for this change. Recruitment for the Treasury was reorganised around merit and fixed pay. The Treasury shifted from hiring through royal connections to a small, selective elite. Stricter exams raised entry standards. However, public school connections still mattered. By 1914, public school and Oxbridge men dominated the ranks of the Treasury.

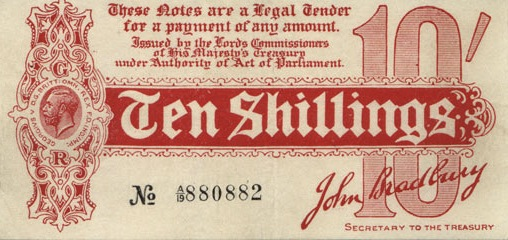
A Bradbury note issued by the Treasury.

During the First World War, the Treasury attempted to stabilise finances. It closed the Stock Exchange, paused many payments, and issued new paper money like the Bradbury note. Ideologically, the Treasury shifted from Gladstonian prudence to Keynesian management of jobs and prices.

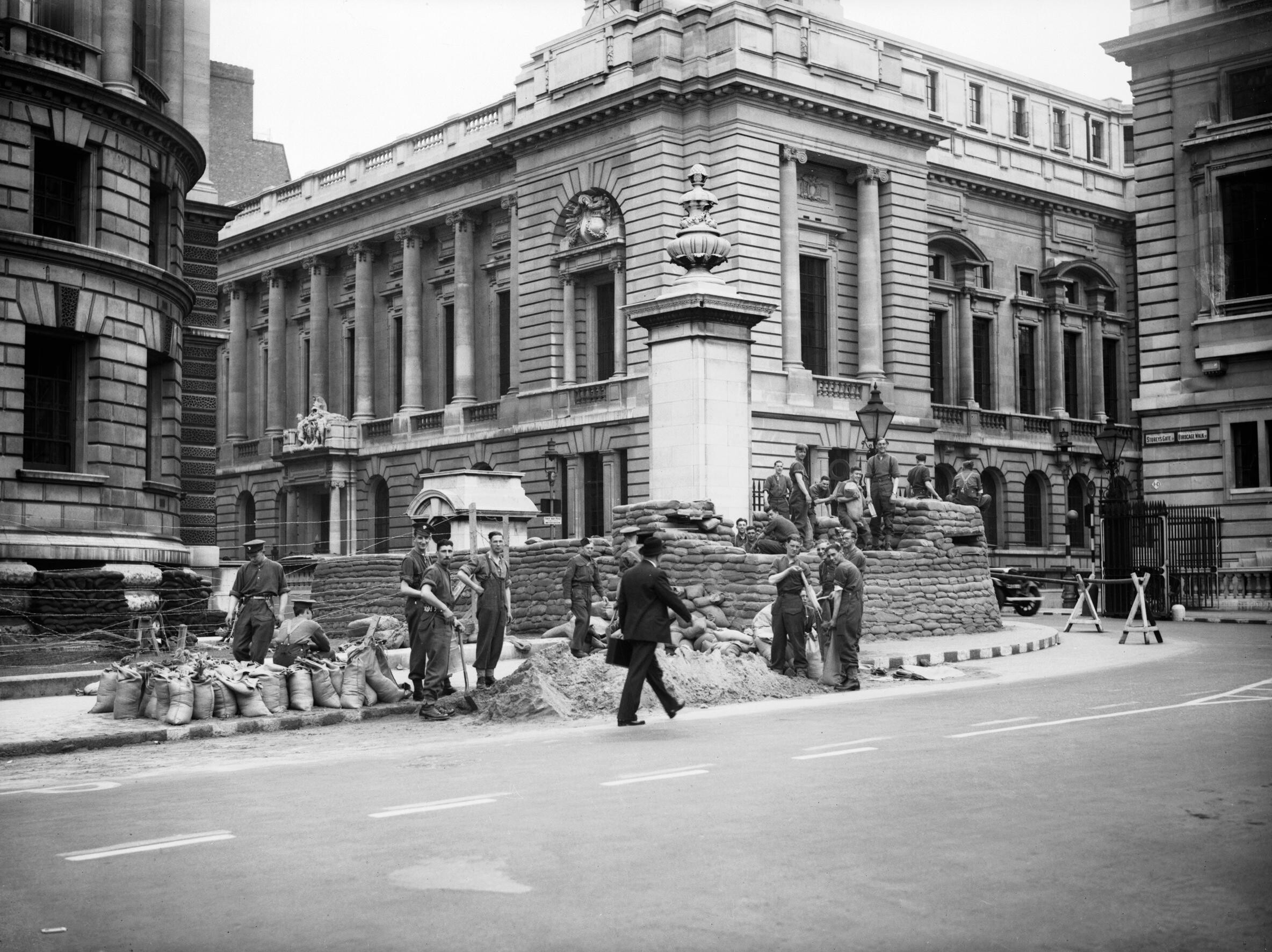
Troops from the Grenadier Guards constructing sandbag defences around the Treasury.

In the Second World War, Blitz bombing damaged the Treasury building. This led the Treasury to move to 1 Horse Guards Road, where it remains to this day. For the first time, the 1941 Budget used national accounts. National accounts track the entire economy's income and output. The Treasury now had a complete picture of the economy. In 1947, Sir Stafford Cripps moved economic planning into the Treasury. The Treasury now managed the budget, national accounts, and the pound.

Between 1947 and 1968, the Treasury would see a shrinking of power. Parliamentary reviews from 1957 to 1958 resulted in the Plowden Report. This report encouraged more delegation to departments. Another report in 1968 criticised the Treasury's role as being too broad. The Treasury would hand over some functions to a newly created Civil Service Department.

In 2022, the Permanent Secretary, Sir Tom Scholar, was sacked by Chancellor Kwasi Kwarteng and Prime Minister Liz Truss. Contemporary reporting described it as unprecedented in Treasury history.

=== Discord server ===
Also in October 2022, the HM Treasury decided to start up a read-only Discord server to appeal with a younger audience, with only the server owner being able to send messages and announcements. Despite only the admin being able to send messages, users could still send emoji reactions to messages and there was a channel showing everyone who joined the server, and it was not long until it caught attention online and was filled with trolls using offensive emojis to react (such as the middle finger) and changing their usernames to say messages.

== Leadership ==
Current Treasury Ministers (As of 20 July 2026)
| Minister | Portrait | Office | Portfolio |
|---|---|---|---|
| Andy Burnham MP | | First Lord of the Treasury | Formal head of the Treasury, concurrently serves as the Prime Minister. |
| John Healey MP | | Chancellor of the Exchequer | Delivering the government’s growth mission; Fiscal policy (including presenting the annual Budget); Oversight of the monetary framework, including setting the inflation remit, and liaison with the Governor of the Bank of England on monetary policy; Women in the economy and the gender pay gap; UK growth and productivity, including working across government on skills, labour market and migration; The National Wealth Fund; Capital markets and listings; Economic security and resilience policy; Leading on international economic and financial affairs including at the G7 and G20 and acting as the; UK Governor of the IMF, EBRD and AIIB; Ministerial arrangements (in their role as Second Lord of the Treasury). |
| Emma Reynolds MP | | Chief Secretary to the Treasury | Treasury’s interest in mission delivery and public service reform (noting that responsibility for the Growth Mission sits with the Chancellor of the Exchequer); Public sector pay; Annual Managed Expenditure and welfare spending; Tax credits policy; Childcare, including tax free childcare; Infrastructure spending; Digital and technology spending; Treasury interest in devolution to Scotland, Wales and Northern Ireland; Public Works Loan Board. |
| James Murray MP | | Financial Secretary to the Treasury; Paymaster General | As Financial Secretary The UK tax system including: Direct, indirect, business, property, and personal taxation (except for taxes covered by EST); European and other international tax issues; Customs and VAT at the border; Fiscal Devolution; The Finance Bill and the National Insurance Bill; Indirect taxes, including stakeholder engagement on excise duties and excise fraud and law enforcement; Tax administration policy; Input to Investment Zones and Freeports focussing on tax and customs elements; Taxation of charities, the voluntary sector and gift aid; Energy, environment and climate taxes (including transport taxes); Energy profits Levy |
| Lucy Rigby MP | | Economic Secretary to the Treasury; City Minister | Financial services policy, reform and regulation including: Financial conduct, including relationship with the FCA; Financial stability, including relationship with the PRA; Competitiveness and growth of the financial services sector; Banking and consumer credit; Insurance and pensions markets; Financial inclusion and capability; Sustainable finance; Fintech and crypto assets, including Central Bank Digital Currency; International financial services including regulatory cooperation and financial services EU issues; Sponsorship of UKGI and State-owned financial assets; Cash and Payments including Royal Mint; Supporting the Chancellor on capital markets and listings; Women in Finance and supporting the Chancellor on the Women in the Economy agenda; Engagement with the Financial Services sector; Financial services tax, including bank levy, bank corporation tax surcharge, Insurance Premium Tax; Personal savings policy, including ISAs, savings tax and pensions tax policy; Financial sanctions and countering economic crime, money laundering and illicit finance, including the Office for Financial Sanctions Implementation (OFSI); The Treasury’s interest in Overseas Territories and Crown Dependencies issues; Parliamentary deputy on economy issues. |
| Dan Tomlinson MP | | Exchequer Secretary to the Treasury; Minister for Growth | The Treasury’s input to: Workforce policy, including global talent and migration; devolution policy, including: regional growth, cities and elements of housing and planning reform; Net Zero, including Great British Energy, decarbonisation, and green industries; Industrial Strategy; Innovation including R&D, AI, digital economy and diffusion; Inward and foreign direct investment (non-FS), including HMT’ s oversight of the Office for Investment and investor relations; Procurement and commercial strategy; Economic and business regulation and competition; Reforms to the UK’s Public Financial Institutions, including driving growth via the National Wealth Fund and British Business Bank; Business engagement (non-FS); The Crown Estate; Departmental minister for HM Treasury Group (including responsibility for the Darlington campus). Jointly with Cabinet Office |
| Torsten Bell MP | | Pensions Minister | Supporting the Chancellor on economic and monetary policy, including debt and reserves management policy, National Savings and Investment (NS&I), the Office for Budget Responsibility (OBR) and Debt Management Office (DMO); Labour market, skills and welfare reform (working with CST on spending decisions); Pension tax policy and public sector pensions. Jointly with Department for Work and Pensions |
| David Pitt-Watson, Baron Pitt-Watson | | Parliamentary Secretary for the Treasury (Note: The roles of Parliamentary Secretary for the Treasury and Parliamentary Secretary to the Treasury are distinct and should not be confused, the former being a junior minister working in the Treasury while the latter is a sinecure position held by the Government Chief Whip) | Supporting the Treasury's role across government and Treasury ministers in their duties. |
| Anneliese Midgley MP | | Parliamentary Secretary to the Treasury | Government Chief Whip, though formally a junior minister in the Treasury. |

=== Civil Servants ===
From October 2022, the Permanent Secretary to the Treasury is James Bowler. There are two Second Permanent Secretaries: Beth Russell and Jim O'Neill.

== Functions ==
HM Treasury is the United Kingdom's economic and finance ministry. It manages public spending and leads the government's economic strategy, with responsibility for fiscal policy (including the Budget and tax policy) and for controlling public expenditure across departments. It allocates resources through Spending Reviews and sets departmental budgets to deliver ministers' priorities and value for money. It also sets the strategic framework for the tax and customs system and works with HM Revenue & Customs on policy design and delivery.

In macroeconomic management, the Treasury sets the fiscal framework and coordinates fiscal policy with the Bank of England's operationally independent monetary policy. The government's fiscal rules and the role of the Office for Budget Responsibility (OBR) provides independent forecasts that accompany the Budget and assess performance against the rules.

The Treasury also leads policy for the UK's financial services framework and legislation, while specialist regulators supervise firms and markets. In particular, HM Treasury is responsible for financial services policy and for taking the relevant legislation through Parliament; prudential and conduct supervision is carried out by the Prudential Regulation Authority and the Financial Conduct Authority within the statutory framework (notably the Financial Services and Markets Act 2000).

As the government's central finance ministry, the Treasury works across Whitehall to ensure policies are affordable, consistent with the fiscal framework and deliverable within spending limits. Public spending plans and tax measures are adjusted at fiscal events (such as the annual Budget) in light of the economic outlook, Parliamentary scrutiny and statutory rules.

The Treasury has additional offices in Darlington and Norwich.

== See also ==
- Budget of the United Kingdom
- Economy of the United Kingdom
- Lord High Treasurer
- Chancellor of the Exchequer
