= The New Capitalists =

2006 book by Davis, Lukomnik, and Pitt-Watson

The New Capitalists: How Citizen Investors Are Reshaping the Corporate Agenda
- Author: Stephen Davis; Jon Lukomnik; David Pitt-Watson
- Language: English
- Genre: Non-fiction
- Publisher: Harvard Business School Press
- Publication date: 2006
- Publication place: United States
- ISBN: 1-4221-0101-0

The New Capitalists: How Citizen Investors Are Reshaping the Corporate Agenda is a 2006 book by Stephen Davis, Jon Lukomnik and David Pitt-Watson. It describes the increasing ownership of companies by collective investment schemes representing millions of savers. The millions of savers are called the "New Capitalists". They include individuals with retirement savings, life insurance and other direct and indirect equity investments. Currently they represent between one half and one third of the adult population of most developed countries, and own between 40% and 80% of the outstanding shares on the stock markets of the developed world.

The book describes how the existence of millions of beneficial owners changes the nature of company goals, and the meaning of shareholder value. Though companies may avoid the influence of these new owners, the book argues that a series of forces, collectively known as the civil economy are strengthening markedly the influence of the New Capitalists. The Wall Street Journal, Financial Times, and The Australian Financial Review named The New Capitalists as one of the best business books of 2006. Fast Company’s review said: "Combine Adam Smith's capitalist self-interest in The Wealth of Nations with Peter Drucker, who predicted the rise of institutional investors repping everyday people, to get The New Capitalists, which says, listen to your investors—or pay the consequences".
