= James Pitt-Watson =

Scottish minister and academic

The Very Reverend Professor James Pitt-Watson
- Moderator of the General Assembly
- Church: Church of Scotland
- In office: 1953 to 1954
- Predecessor: George Johnstone Jeffrey
- Successor: Ernest David Jarvis

Personal details
- Born: 9 November 1893
- Died: 25 December 1962 (aged 69)
- Denomination: Presbyterianism
- Occupation: Church minister and academic

James Pitt-Watson (9 November 1893 – 25 December 1962) was a Scottish minister and academic. He was Professor of Practical Theology at Glasgow University and served as Moderator of the General Assembly of the Church of Scotland in 1953. He has been described as an "ecclesiastical politician".

== Life ==
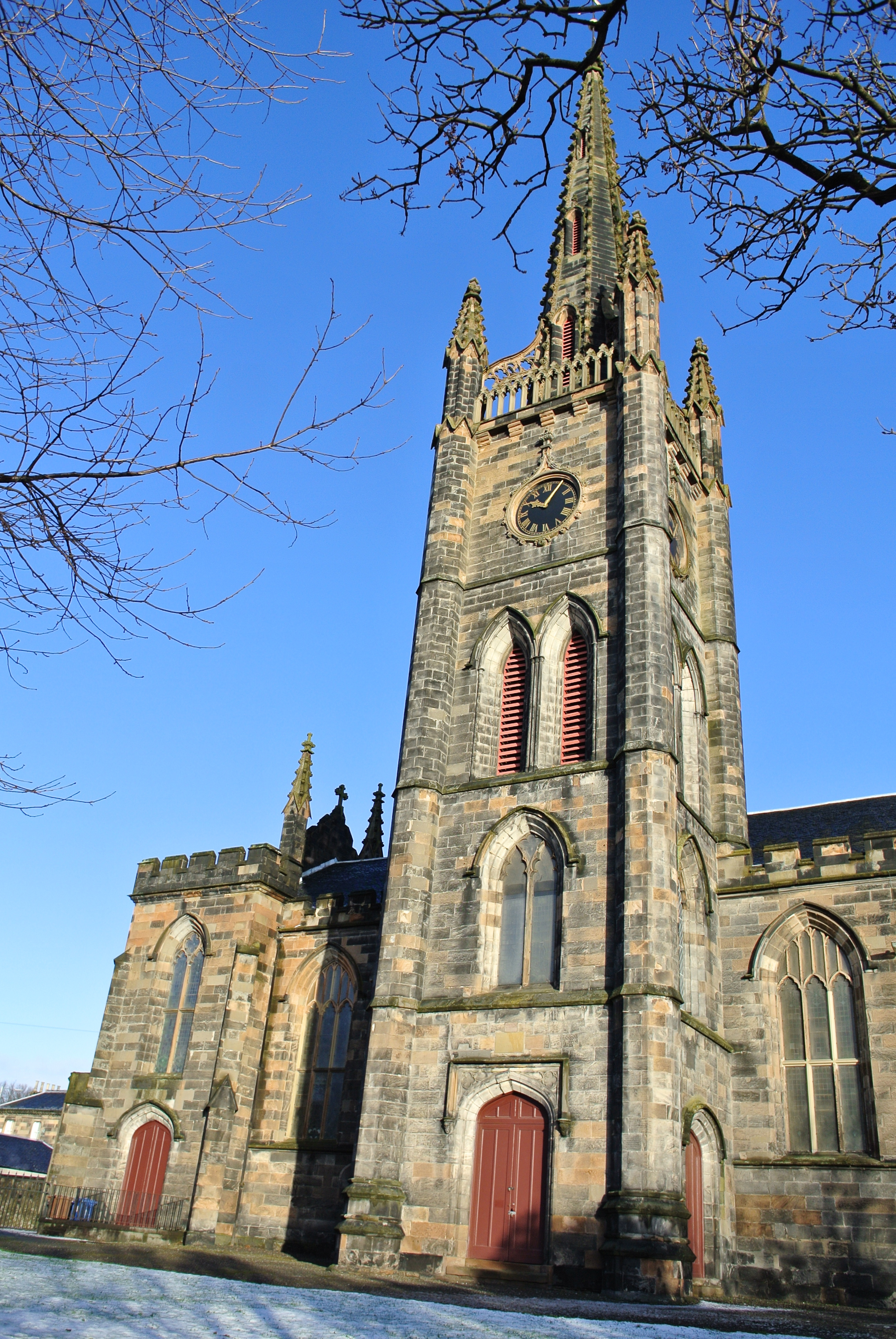
St Mungo's in Alloa

James Pitt-Watson was born on 9 November 1893. He was educated at George Heriot's School, a private school in Edinburgh, Scotland. He studied and trained for ministry at the University of Edinburgh.

Pitt-Watson was ordained for the Church of Scotland in 1920. He was minister of St. Mungo's Parish Church in Alloa church in central Scotland from 1929 to 1946. During his time as Moderator he presented a Bible to Queen Elizabeth II at her coronation, saying, "Here is wisdom, this is the royal law, these are the lively Oracles of God." Other duties as Moderator included opening the new church at Colinton Mains in south-west Edinburgh

He died on Christmas Day, 25 December 1962. His obituary was written by the Very Rev A C Craig.

== Family ==
He was father to Rev Prof Ian Pitt-Watson (1923-1995). Through his son Ian, he is grandfather to the Scottish businessman, David Pitt-Watson.
