= Barnet Council =

Barnet Council could refer to:

- The current Barnet London Borough Council, created in 1965
- Barnet Rural District Council, renamed Elstree in 1941
- Barnet Urban District Council, abolished in 1965
- East Barnet Urban District Council, abolished in 1965
- Friern Barnet Urban District Council, abolished in 1965
