= Dan Tomlinson =

British politician (born 1992)

Dan Tomlinson MP
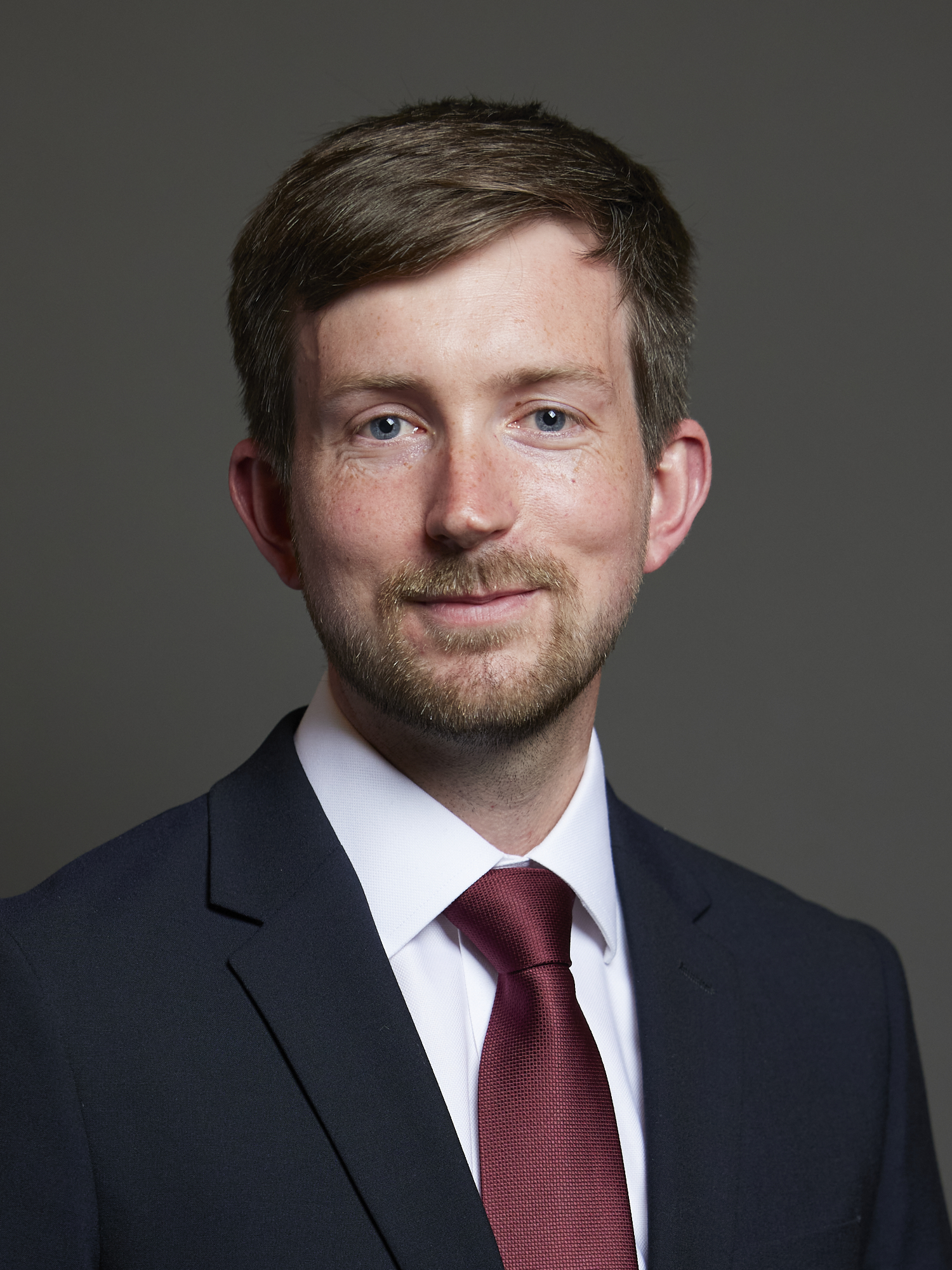
- Official portrait, 2024

Exchequer Secretary to the Treasury
- Incumbent
- Assumed office 1 September 2025
- Prime Minister: Keir Starmer; Andy Burnham
- Preceded by: James Murray

Parliamentary Secretary for the Cabinet Office
- Incumbent
- Assumed office 22 July 2026
- Prime Minister: Andy Burnham
- Preceded by: Office established

Member of Parliament for Chipping Barnet
- Incumbent
- Assumed office 4 July 2024
- Preceded by: Theresa Villiers
- Majority: 2,914 (5.7%)

Tower Hamlets Councillor for Bromley North
- In office 3 May 2018 – 5 May 2022

Personal details
- Born: Daniel Mark Tomlinson; July 1992 (age 34)
- Party: Labour
- Education: Wood Green School; University of Oxford (BA)
- Website: dantomlinson.org.uk

Daniel Mark Tomlinson (born July 1992) is a British Labour Party politician who has served as the Exchequer Secretary to the Treasury since 1 September 2025. He has been the Member of Parliament (MP) for Chipping Barnet in north London since 2024. He defeated the Conservative Party incumbent Theresa Villiers.

== Early life and education ==
Tomlinson has said that he "grew up on free school meals and was homeless for a time as a child". He was educated at Wood Green School, a comprehensive school in the market town of Witney, in Oxfordshire, followed by the University of Oxford, where he studied Philosophy, politics and economics. Tomlinson worked for HM Treasury between 2015 and 2016 as well as for the Resolution Foundation between 2015 and 2022, and became a senior economist for the foundation. He also worked at the Joseph Rowntree Foundation.

== Political career ==
Tomlinson was a councillor in the London Borough of Tower Hamlets from 2018 until 2022. He did not stand for reelection in 2022 and Labour subsequently lost control of the council to Aspire.

Inside Housing listed Tomlinson as one of eight newly elected MPs who would be advocates for the cause of social housing in the new Labour government. In 2026, Tomlinson criticised the High Barnet tube station residential development plans, citing local concerns for the development height. The plans put forward by the Labour Mayor of London include a 40% affordable housing ratio. The London Mayor's consent for his plans, overturned the local decision taken by Barnet London Borough Council, that had rejected the Mayor's planning application for the tube car park's residential development.

On 1 September 2025, Tomlinson was appointed as Exchequer Secretary to the Treasury in a ministerial reshuffle. He replaced James Murray, who was promoted to Chief Secretary to the Treasury. He was reappointed as Exchequer Secretary to the Treasury and appointed as Minister for Growth jointly in the Cabinet Office and HM Treasury on 22 July 2026.

On 14 August 2026, Tomlinson was a panellist on BBC Radio 4, Any Questions? programme that came from Dorset. He called into question the judgement of the leader of Reform UK, Nigel Farage, for his role in the 2026 Clacton by-election, that was estimated to have cost local taxpayers up to £250,000. He also claimed that since his own election in 2024, Barnet had increased the number of police officers locally from 80, to 105.

== Personal life ==
Tomlinson lives in Barnet with his family.

Parliament of the United Kingdom
Preceded by Theresa Villiers	Member of Parliament for Chipping Barnet; 2024–present	Incumbent
Political offices
Preceded by James Murray	Exchequer Secretary to the Treasury; 2025–present	Incumbent
