= Parliamentary Under-Secretary of State for Pensions =

British junior governmental position

United Kingdom Parliamentary Under-Secretary of State for Pensions
- Royal Arms of His Majesty's Government

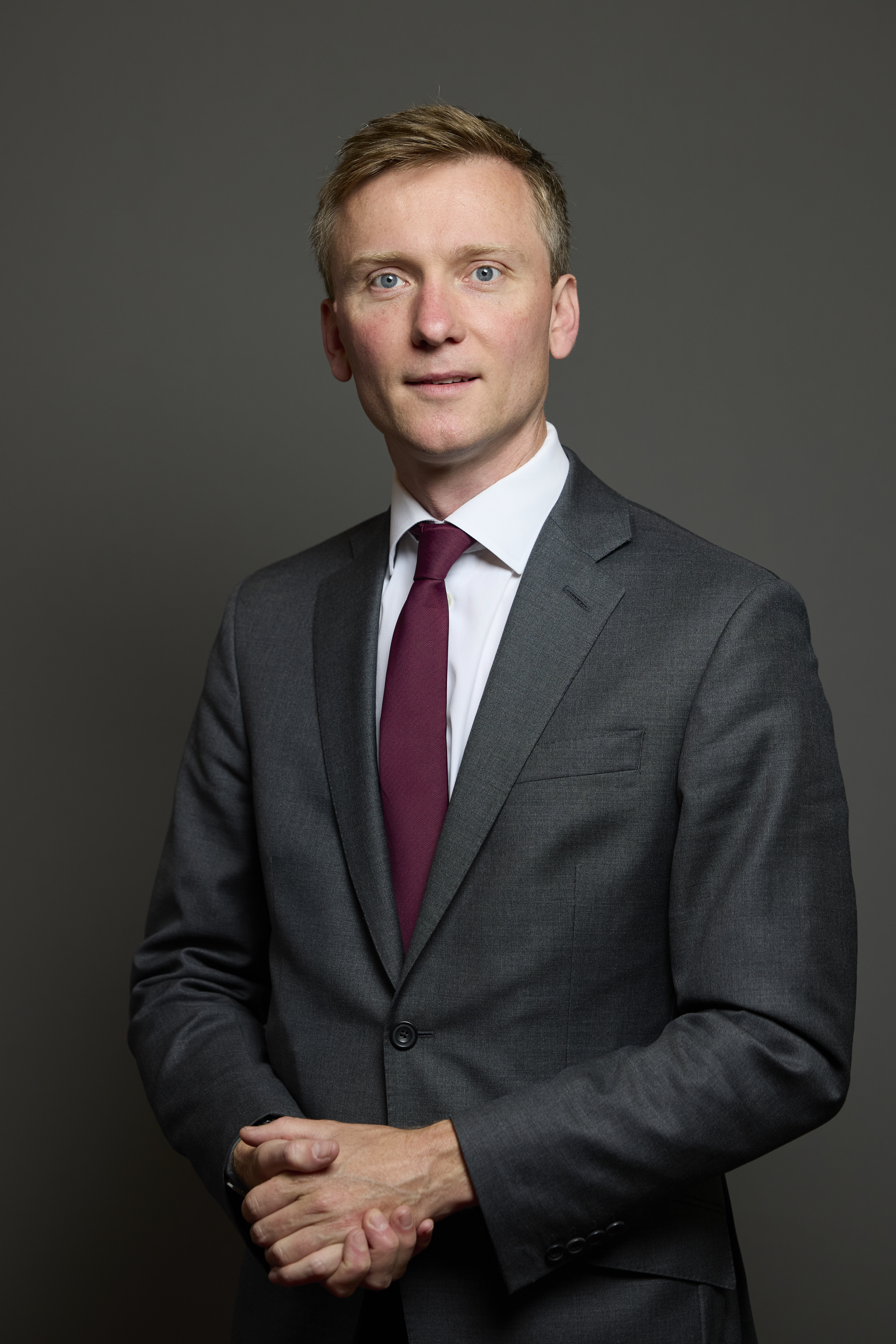
- Incumbent; Torsten Bell since 14 January 2025
- His Majesty's Treasury; Department for Work and Pensions
- Style: Minister
- Nominator: Prime Minister of the United Kingdom
- Appointer: The Monarch; on advice of the Prime Minister
- Term length: At His Majesty's pleasure
- Website: www.gov.uk/government/ministers/parliamentary-secretary--13

The Parliamentary Under-Secretary of State for Pensions or Pensions Minister a junior position held jointly in His Majesty's Treasury and the Department for Work and Pensions in the British government.

== Responsibilities ==
The minister's responsibilities include:

- Pensioner benefits, including new State Pension, Winter Fuel Payments, Pension Credit and Attendance Allowance
- Private and occupational pensions, including regulatory powers and the National Employment Savings Trust (NEST)
- Automatic enrolment into a workplace pension
- Oversight of arm's-length bodies, including the Pensions Regulator, Pension Protection Fund, Financial Assistance Scheme and Pensions Ombudsman
- Financial guidance, budgeting, saving and debt, including the Money and Pensions Service and Financial Inclusion Policy Forum
- Methods of payment and Post Office Card Accounts
- EU Exit preparation relevant to pensions
- Cross-DWP spokesperson – shadowing Lords

== List of ministers ==
Name	Portrait	Entered office	Left office	Political party	Prime Minister
Under-Secretary of State, Health and Social Security
Lynda Chalker		7 May 1979	5 March 1982	Conservative	Margaret Thatcher
Tony Newton		5 March 1982	11 September 1984	Conservative	Margaret Thatcher
Ray Whitney		11 September 1984	10 September 1986	Conservative	Margaret Thatcher
Nicholas Lyell		10 September 1986	13 June 1987	Conservative	Margaret Thatcher
Michael Portillo		13 June 1987	25 July 1988	Conservative	Margaret Thatcher
Parliamentary Under-Secretary of State, Social Security
Peter Lloyd		25 July 1988	28 July 1989	Conservative	Margaret Thatcher
Gillian Shephard		25 July 1989	28 November 1990	Conservative	Margaret Thatcher
Michael Jack		28 November 1990	14 April 1992	Conservative	John Major
Ann Widdecombe		30 November 1990	27 May 1993	Conservative	John Major
Alistair Burt		14 April 1992	6 July 1995	Conservative	John Major
William Hague		27 May 1993	20 July 1994	Conservative	John Major
James Arbuthnot		20 July 1994	6 July 1995	Conservative	John Major
Roger Evans		20 July 1994	2 May 1997	Conservative	John Major
Andrew Mitchell		6 July 1995	2 May 1997	Conservative	John Major
Oliver Heald		6 July 1995	2 May 1997	Conservative	John Major
Minister of State for Social Security with special responsibility for War Pensions
John MacKay, Baron MacKay of Ardbrecknish		5 July 1995	4 May 1997	Conservative	John Major
Minister of State for Pensions
John Denham		1 May 1997	30 December 1998	Labour	Tony Blair
Stephen Timms		23 December 1998	29 July 1999	Labour	Tony Blair
Jeff Rooker		29 July 1999	7 June 2001	Labour	Tony Blair
Malcolm Wicks		8 June 2001	4 April 2003	Labour	Tony Blair
Ian McCartney		13 June 2003	6 May 2005	Labour	Tony Blair
Stephen Timms		6 May 2005	5 May 2006	Labour	Tony Blair
James Purnell		5 May 2006	28 June 2007	Labour	Tony Blair
Mike O'Brien		27 June 2007	5 October 2008	Labour	Gordon Brown
Rosie Winterton		24 January 2008	5 June 2009	Labour	Gordon Brown
Minister of State for Pensions and Ageing Society
Angela Eagle		8 June 2009	11 May 2010	Labour	Gordon Brown
Minister of State for Pensions
Steve Webb		12 May 2010	8 May 2015	Liberal Democrats	David Cameron
Ros Altmann, Baroness Altmann		11 May 2015	15 July 2016	Conservative	David Cameron
Parliamentary Under-Secretary of State for Pensions
Richard Harrington		17 July 2016	14 June 2017	Conservative	Theresa May
Parliamentary Under-Secretary of State for Pensions and Financial Inclusion
Guy Opperman		14 June 2017	8 September 2022 (Note: Office vacant between 7 July and 8 July 2022, when Opperman resigned from the government until Boris Johnson announced his resignation as prime minister.)	Conservative	Theresa May; Boris Johnson
Parliamentary Under-Secretary of State for Pensions and Growth
Alex Burghart		20 September 2022	27 October 2022	Conservative	Liz Truss
Parliamentary Under-Secretary of State for Pensions
Laura Trott		27 October 2022	13 November 2023	Conservative	Rishi Sunak
Paul Maynard		13 November 2023	5 July 2024	Conservative	Rishi Sunak
Emma Reynolds		9 July 2024	14 January 2025	Labour	Keir Starmer
Torsten Bell		14 January 2025	Incumbent	Labour	Keir Starmer
Torsten Bell		14 January 2025	Incumbent	Labour	Andy Burnham
