= Parliamentary Secretary for the Treasury =

United Kingdom Parliamentary Secretary for the Treasury
- Royal arms of His Majesty's Government

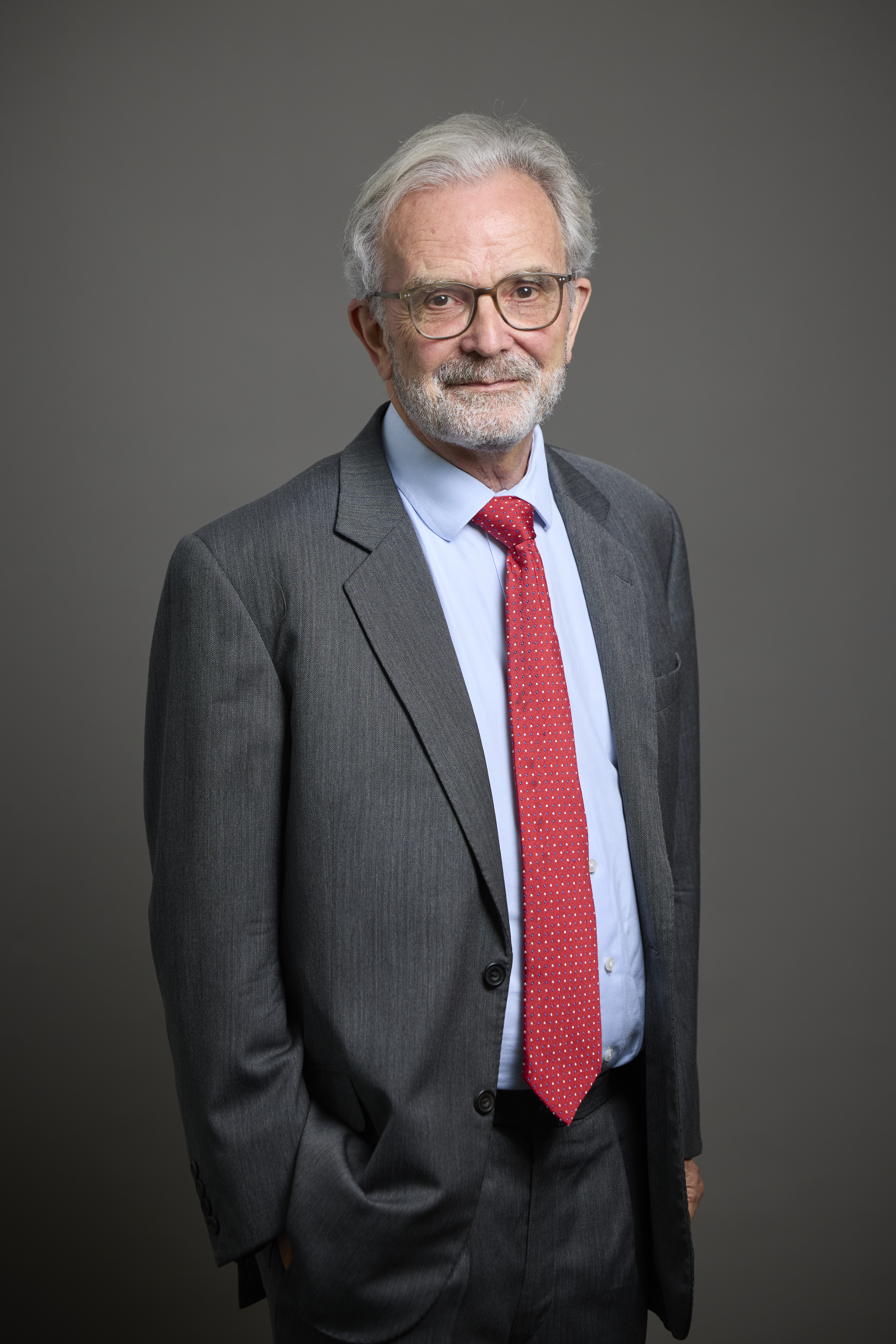
- Incumbent; David Pitt-Watson, Baron Pitt-Watson since 22 July 2026
- His Majesty's Treasury
- Reports to: First Lord of the Treasury; Chancellor of the Exchequer & Second Lord of the Treasury
- Nominator: Prime Minister
- Appointer: The King (on the advice of the prime minister)
- Term length: At His Majesty's pleasure
- Website: Official website

The parliamentary secretary for the Treasury is a junior ministerial post in His Majesty's Treasury, responsible for supporting the Treasury's role across government and supporting other Treasury ministers in their duties.

The current holder is David Pitt-Watson, Baron Pitt-Watson who serves as the representative of the Treasury in the House of Lords.

== Office holders ==
Name	Portrait	Entered office	Left office	Political party	Prime Minister	Chancellor
Joanna Penn, Baroness Penn		26 October 2022	13 November 2023	Conservative	Rishi Sunak	Jeremy Hunt
Charlotte Vere, Baroness Vere of Norbiton		14 November 2023	5 July 2024	Conservative	Rishi Sunak	Jeremy Hunt
Emma Reynolds		9 July 2024	14 January 2025	Labour	Keir Starmer	Rachel Reeves
Torsten Bell		14 January 2025	21 July 2026	Labour	Keir Starmer	Rachel Reeves
David Pitt-Watson, Baron Pitt-Watson		22 July 2026	Incumbent	Labour	Andy Burnham	John Healey

== See also ==
- Secretary to the Treasury
