= Torsten Bell =

British politician

Torsten Bell MP
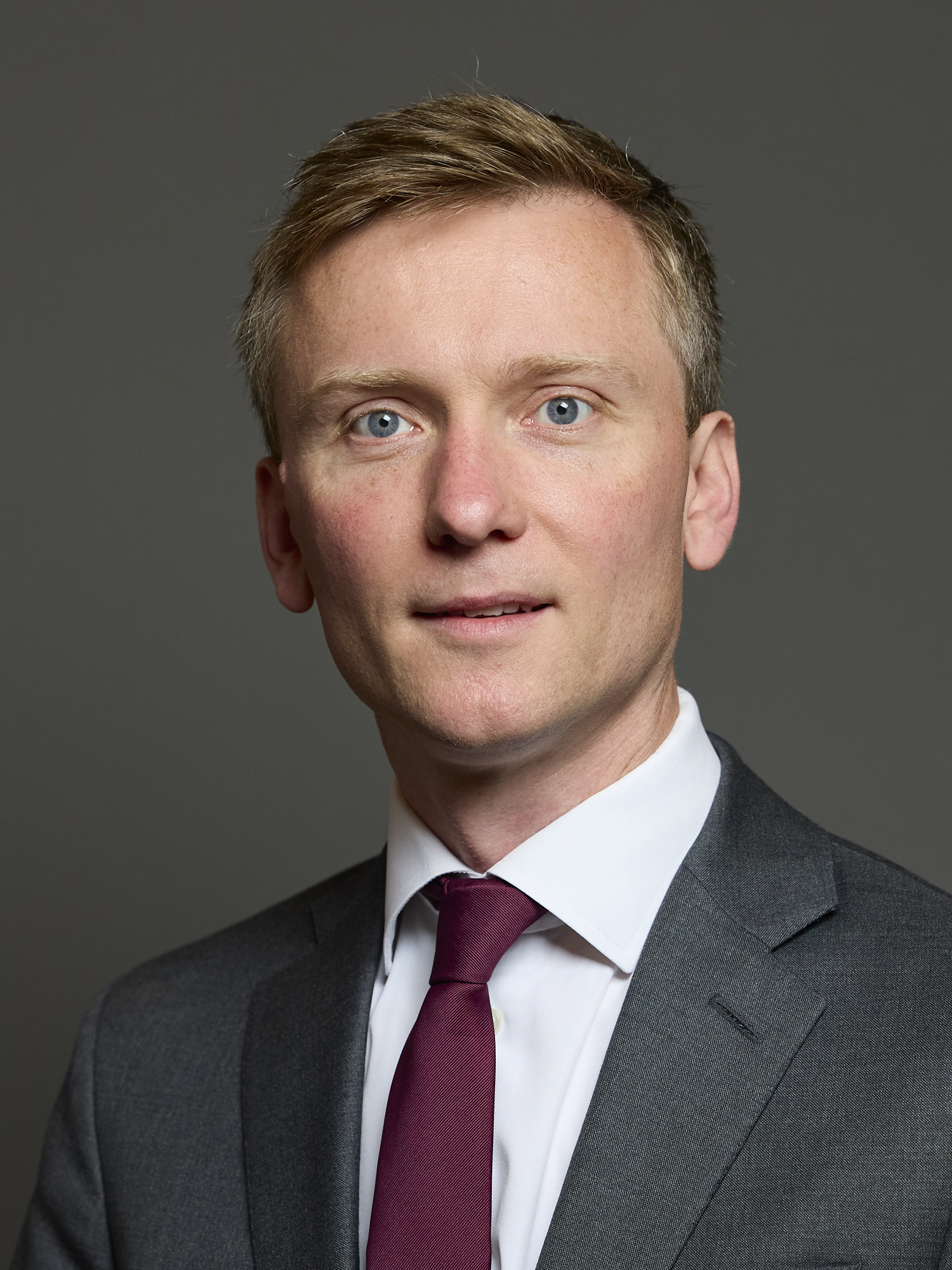
- Official portrait, 2024

Parliamentary Under-Secretary of State for Pensions
- Incumbent
- Assumed office 14 January 2025
- Prime Minister: Keir Starmer; Andy Burnham
- Preceded by: Emma Reynolds

Parliamentary Secretary for the Treasury
- In office 14 January 2025 – 21 July 2026
- Prime Minister: Keir Starmer
- Preceded by: Emma Reynolds
- Succeeded by: The Lord Pitt-Watson

Member of Parliament for Swansea West
- Incumbent
- Assumed office 4 July 2024
- Preceded by: Geraint Davies
- Majority: 8,515 (23.9%)

Personal details
- Born: Torsten Henricson Bell; September 1982 (age 43–44) Greenwich, London, England
- Citizenship: United Kingdom
- Party: Labour
- Children: 2
- Education: Mansfield College, Oxford (BA)
- Known for: Chief Executive of the Resolution Foundation (2015–2024)

Torsten Henricson Bell (born September 1982) is a Labour politician, economist, author, and newspaper columnist, serving as Member of Parliament (MP) for Swansea West since 2024. He was appointed as Parliamentary Secretary for the Treasury and Parliamentary Under-Secretary of State for Pensions in January 2025.

Previously he was the chief executive of the Resolution Foundation, an economic thinktank, from 2015 to 2024.

He was appointed to the Resolution Foundation in 2015 after having served as Ed Miliband's Director of policy, and as a Treasury civil servant who became special adviser to Alistair Darling during the 2008 financial crisis.

== Early life and education ==
Bell was born in Greenwich, London and moved to Kent as a young child. His Swedish mother works as an author and policy analyst specialising in family policy, and his Scottish father works as a charity executive.

Bell was educated at The Judd School in Tonbridge going on to graduate in philosophy, politics and economics at Mansfield College, Oxford. At Oxford, Bell was editor of the student newspaper Cherwell.

== Early career ==
Since 2017, he has written a column in The Observer named Hidden Gems from the World of Research.

Bell writes regularly about poverty and inequality in the United Kingdom, about the North–South divide in England and the levelling-up policy of the British government. He described the September 2022 United Kingdom mini-budget as "the biggest unforced economic policy error of my lifetime."

Bell has been associated with the coordination of policy developments for the Labour Party. He has received recognition across various factions within the party for his attention to detail.

In November 2022, Bell was appointed Honorary Professor at the UCL Policy Lab.

In September 2023, Bell was named as the tenth most powerful left-wing figure in the UK by the New Statesman.

== Parliamentary career ==
In May 2024, Bell was selected as the Labour Party candidate for the seat of Swansea West in the 2024 general election, which raised some criticism from local members for his having "no connection" to the area and "no Welsh connection". Despite this, in July 2024, Bell was elected as the Member of Parliament for the Swansea West constituency, with 41.4% share of the vote, and a majority of 8,515.

From July 2024 to January 2025, Bell was Parliamentary Private Secretary to the Cabinet Office. Thereafter he was appointed Parliamentary Under-Secretary of State for Pensions, replacing Emma Reynolds, who was promoted following the resignation of Tulip Siddiq.

Torsten Bell voted against a Scottish National Party (SNP) amendment to scrap the two-child benefit cap in July 2024, sticking with the government line despite his previous criticism of the policy.

Bell defended the decision by the chancellor, Rachel Reeves, to rule out a wealth tax, claiming it would not have much of an impact, despite claiming in a previous article how wealth taxes would raise billions in revenue.

== Personal life ==
Bell's twin brother, Olaf, is a civil servant.

== Works ==
- Bell, Torsten (13 June 2024). Great Britain? How We Get Our Future Back. Vintage. ISBN 9781529932409.
