= Emma Reynolds =

British politician (born 1977)

The Right Honourable Emma Reynolds MP
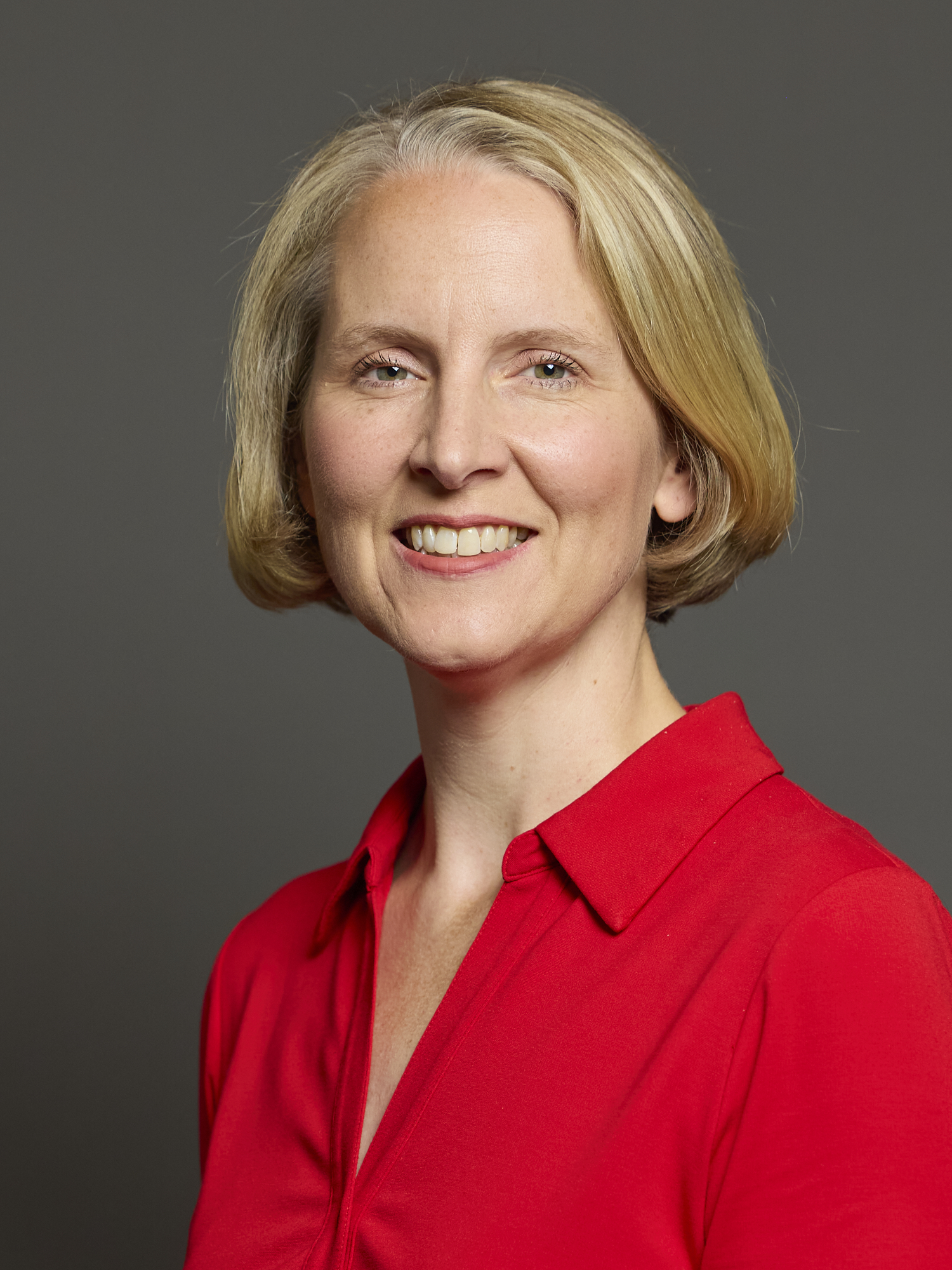
- Official portrait, 2024

Chief Secretary to the Treasury
- Incumbent
- Assumed office 20 July 2026
- Prime Minister: Andy Burnham
- Preceded by: Lucy Rigby

Secretary of State for Environment, Food and Rural Affairs
- In office 5 September 2025 – 20 July 2026
- Prime Minister: Keir Starmer
- Preceded by: Steve Reed
- Succeeded by: Angela Eagle
Junior ministerial offices
Economic Secretary to the Treasury City Minister
In office 14 January 2025 – 5 September 2025
Prime Minister	Keir Starmer
Preceded by	Tulip Siddiq
Succeeded by	Lucy Rigby
Parliamentary Under-Secretary of State for Pensions Parliamentary Secretary for the Treasury
In office 9 July 2024 – 14 January 2025
Prime Minister	Keir Starmer
Preceded by	Paul Maynard (Pensions); The Baroness Vere of Norbiton (Treasury)
Succeeded by	Torsten Bell
Shadow portfolios
Shadow Secretary of State for Communities and Local Government
In office 8 May 2015 – 14 September 2015
Leader	Harriet Harman (acting)
Preceded by	Hilary Benn
Succeeded by	Jon Trickett
Shadow Minister for Housing
In office 7 October 2013 – 8 May 2015
Leader	Ed Miliband
Preceded by	Jack Dromey
Succeeded by	John Healey
Shadow Minister for Europe
In office 7 October 2010 – 7 October 2013
Leader	Ed Miliband
Preceded by	Wayne David
Succeeded by	Gareth Thomas

Member of Parliament
- Incumbent
- Assumed office 4 July 2024
- Preceded by: Steve Baker
- Constituency: Wycombe
- In office 6 May 2010 – 6 November 2019
- Preceded by: Ken Purchase
- Succeeded by: Jane Stevenson
- Constituency: Wolverhampton North East

Personal details
- Born: Emma Elizabeth Reynolds; 2 November 1977 (age 49) Wolverhampton, West Midlands, England
- Party: Labour
- Spouse: Richard Stevens (m. 2016)
- Children: 2
- Education: Wadham College, Oxford (BA)
- Website: gov.uk/government/people/emma-reynolds--2

Emma Elizabeth Reynolds (born 2 November 1977) is a British politician who has served as Chief Secretary to the Treasury since 2026. A member of the Labour Party, she previously served as Secretary of State for Environment, Food and Rural Affairs from 2025 to 2026. Reynolds has been the Member of Parliament (MP) for Wycombe since 2024, and was previously the MP for Wolverhampton North East from 2010 to 2019.

Born in Wolverhampton, Reynolds was educated at Codsall High School and Wulfrun College. She studied Politics, Philosophy and Economics at Wadham College, Oxford, and later set up her own lobbying business. After working as a political adviser, she was elected to the House of Commons in 2010. She served on the shadow frontbench under Ed Miliband from 2010 to 2015 and was briefly shadow housing secretary under Harriet Harman, before resigning after Jeremy Corbyn became party leader in 2015. She lost her seat at the 2019 general election and subsequently worked as a lobbyist for TheCityUK.

After returning to Parliament at the 2024 general election, Reynolds served as Parliamentary Under-Secretary of State for Pensions and then Economic Secretary to the Treasury under Keir Starmer. In the 2025 cabinet reshuffle, Reynolds was promoted to cabinet as Secretary of State for Environment, Food and Rural Affairs. After Andy Burnham became Prime Minister in 2026, she was appointed Chief Secretary to the Treasury.

== Early life and education ==
Reynolds was born on 2 November 1977. She was educated at Codsall High School in Codsall, Staffordshire, followed by Wulfrun College in nearby Wolverhampton. Reynolds studied at Wadham College, Oxford, where she read Politics, Philosophy and Economics.

== Early career ==
Reynolds set up a lobbying business in Brussels to help British companies that wished to influence EU laws.

From 2001 to 2004, Reynolds worked in Brussels as a political adviser to Robin Cook, then President of the Party of European Socialists. She later worked in Downing Street and the House of Commons as a special advisor to then Minister for Europe and Government Chief Whip Geoff Hoon.

In January 2009, Reynolds joined commercial public affairs consultancy Cogitamus, which gives advice to companies.

== First Parliamentary career ==
=== Election and early career (2010) ===
Reynolds was selected as the Labour candidate for the 2010 general election for Wolverhampton North East in September 2008. Despite a 9% swing to the Conservatives and a reduction in majority of more than 6,000, she held the seat for Labour.

Reynolds spoke in the House of Commons on Building Schools for the Future, free school meals, human trafficking, cuts to police numbers and Mental Health Services. Shortly after her election in 2010 Reynolds was also elected to the Foreign Affairs Select Committee of the House of Commons.

=== Shadow frontbench (2010–2015) ===
In October 2010, Reynolds was promoted by Labour's new leader, Ed Miliband, to the opposition frontbench as a shadow junior Foreign Office Minister under the then Shadow Foreign Secretary, Yvette Cooper. After the resignation of the Shadow Chancellor Alan Johnson and resulting mini-reshuffle of posts, Reynolds continued working in her post under the new Shadow Foreign Secretary, Douglas Alexander. In October 2011, Emma Reynolds was promoted by Labour leader, Ed Miliband, to the position of Shadow Europe Minister. In October 2013, Reynolds was promoted by Ed Miliband to the position of Shadow Housing Minister, replacing Jack Dromey. In May 2015, after the 2015 general election, Reynolds was promoted to the position of Shadow Secretary of State for Communities and Local Government by acting leader of the Labour Party Harriet Harman, following the resignation of Ed Miliband.

=== Later career and defeat (2015–2019) ===
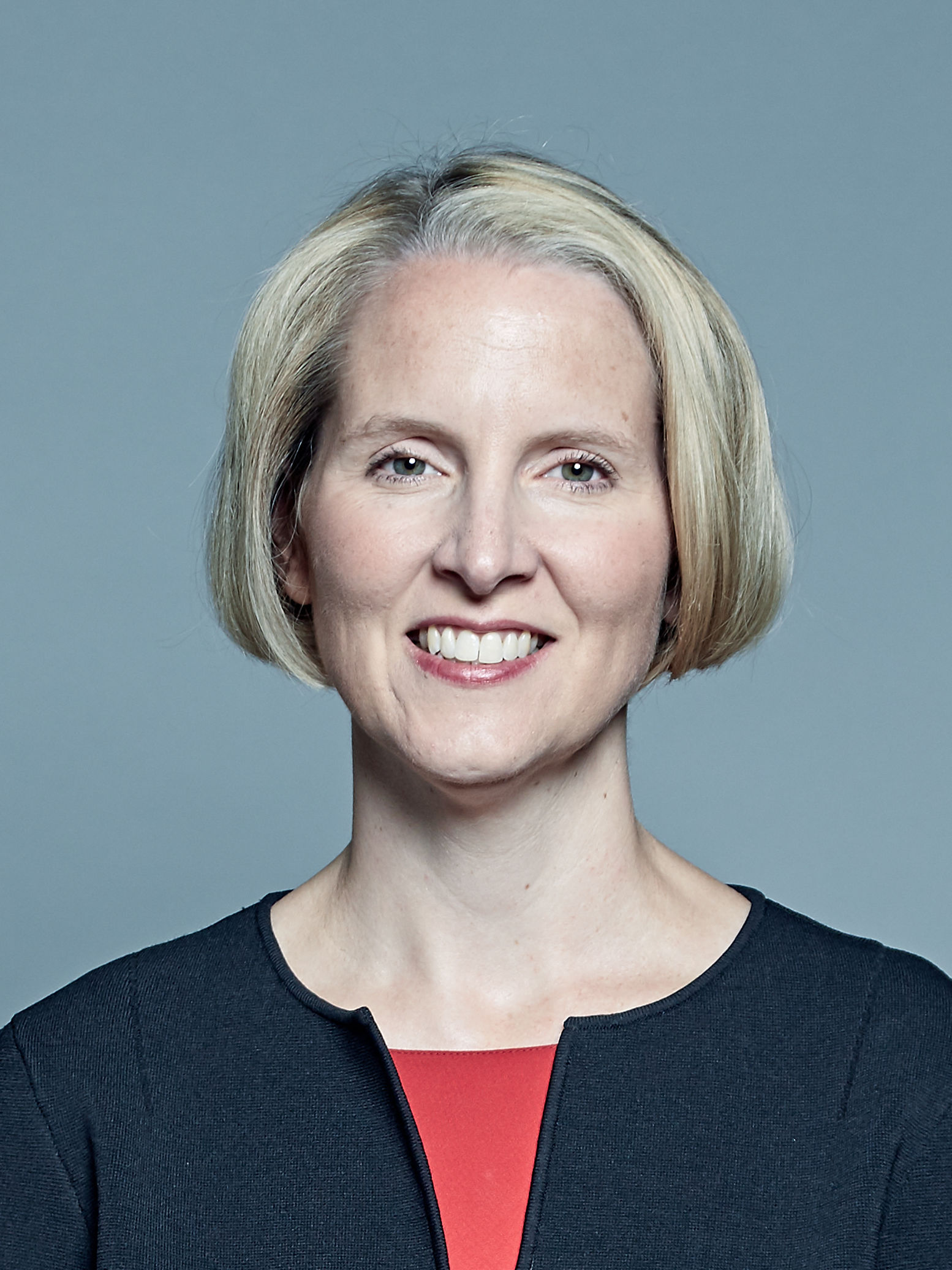
Official portrait, 2018

Reynolds resigned as Shadow Communities Secretary following the election of Jeremy Corbyn as leader of the Labour Party. She later supported Owen Smith in the 2016 Labour Party leadership election.

She was defeated in the 2019 election by the Conservatives' Jane Stevenson.

== Career outside Parliament (2019–2024) ==
Has never had an occupation outside of politics or lobbying in a political environment. Following her departure from parliament in 2019, Reynolds was appointed as Managing Director of Public Affairs, Policy & Research at TheCityUK, a special interest group lobbying the UK Government on behalf of the financial sector. While working for TheCityUK, Reynolds lobbied the UK government to avoid placing China in the strictest category of rules for the registering foreign influence, but denied representing Chinese businesses or the Chinese government.

== Return to Parliament ==
=== Election and junior ministerial career (2024–2025) ===
On 19 November 2022, Reynolds was selected to be the Labour Party's Parliamentary candidate for Wycombe at the 2024 general election.

At the election, Reynolds was elected with a majority of 4,591 over the incumbent MP, former Conservative minister Steve Baker. Reynolds became the first Labour MP for Wycombe since 1951.

On 9 July 2024, Reynolds joined the government frontbench as Parliamentary Under-Secretary of State for Pensions and Parliamentary Secretary for the Treasury under Keir Starmer. On 14 January 2025, she was appointed Economic Secretary to the Treasury, following the resignation of Tulip Siddiq.

=== Environment Secretary (2025–2026) ===
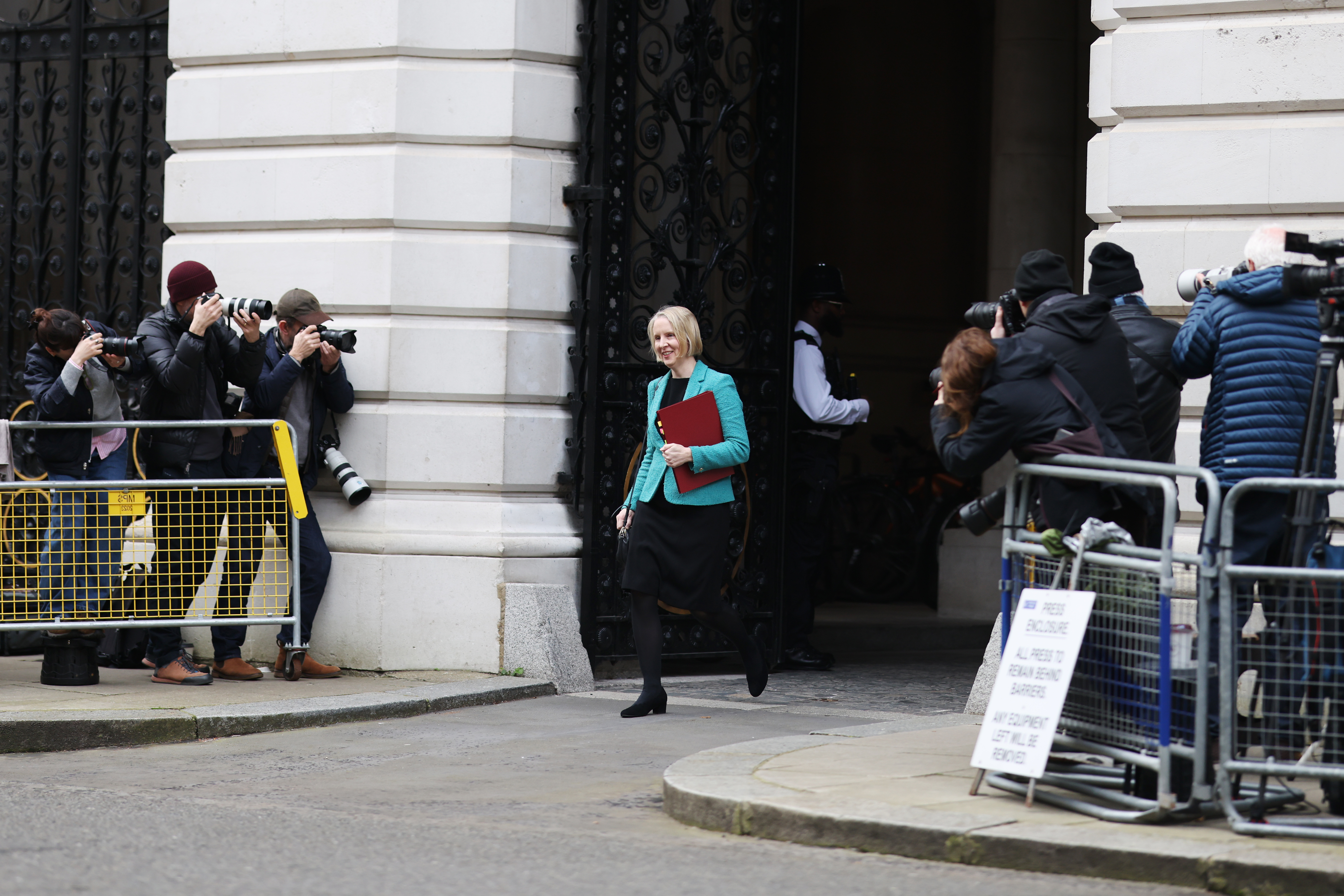
Reynolds attending cabinet in March 2026.

In the 2025 cabinet reshuffle, Reynolds was appointed Secretary of State for Environment, Food and Rural Affairs.

In December 2025, Reynolds announced the government's updated animal welfare strategy, including a ban on trail hunting, snare traps, and puppy farming, phaseout of farrowing crates for pigs and colony cages for egg-laying hens, and new humane slaughter standards for pigs and fish.

=== Chief Secretary to the Treasury (2026–present) ===
On 20 July 2026, Reynolds was appointed Chief Secretary to the Treasury by Andy Burnham.

== Personal life ==
Reynolds enjoys running and used to play football. She also enjoys pubs and going to the cinema.

Reynolds married solicitor Richard Stevens in April 2016. They had their first son on 14 April 2017 and their second in May 2019.

== Honours ==
On 10 September 2025, Reynolds was sworn in as a member of the Privy Council, entitling her to the honorific style The Right Honourable for life.

Parliament of the United Kingdom
Preceded by Ken Purchase	Member of Parliament for Wolverhampton North East; 2010–2019	Succeeded by Jane Stevenson
Preceded by Steve Baker	Member of Parliament for Wycombe; 2024–present	Incumbent
Political offices
Preceded by Wayne David	Shadow Minister for Europe; 2011–2013	Succeeded by Gareth Thomas
Preceded by Jack Dromey	Shadow Minister for Housing; 2013–2015	Succeeded by Roberta Blackman-Woods
Preceded by Hilary Benn	Shadow Secretary of State for Communities and Local Government; 2015	Succeeded by Jon Trickett
Preceded by Steve Reed	Secretary of State for Environment, Food and Rural Affairs; 2025–present	Incumbent
