= David Pitt-Watson, Baron Pitt-Watson =

Scottish business and social entrepreneur and author

The Right Honourable The Lord Pitt-Watson
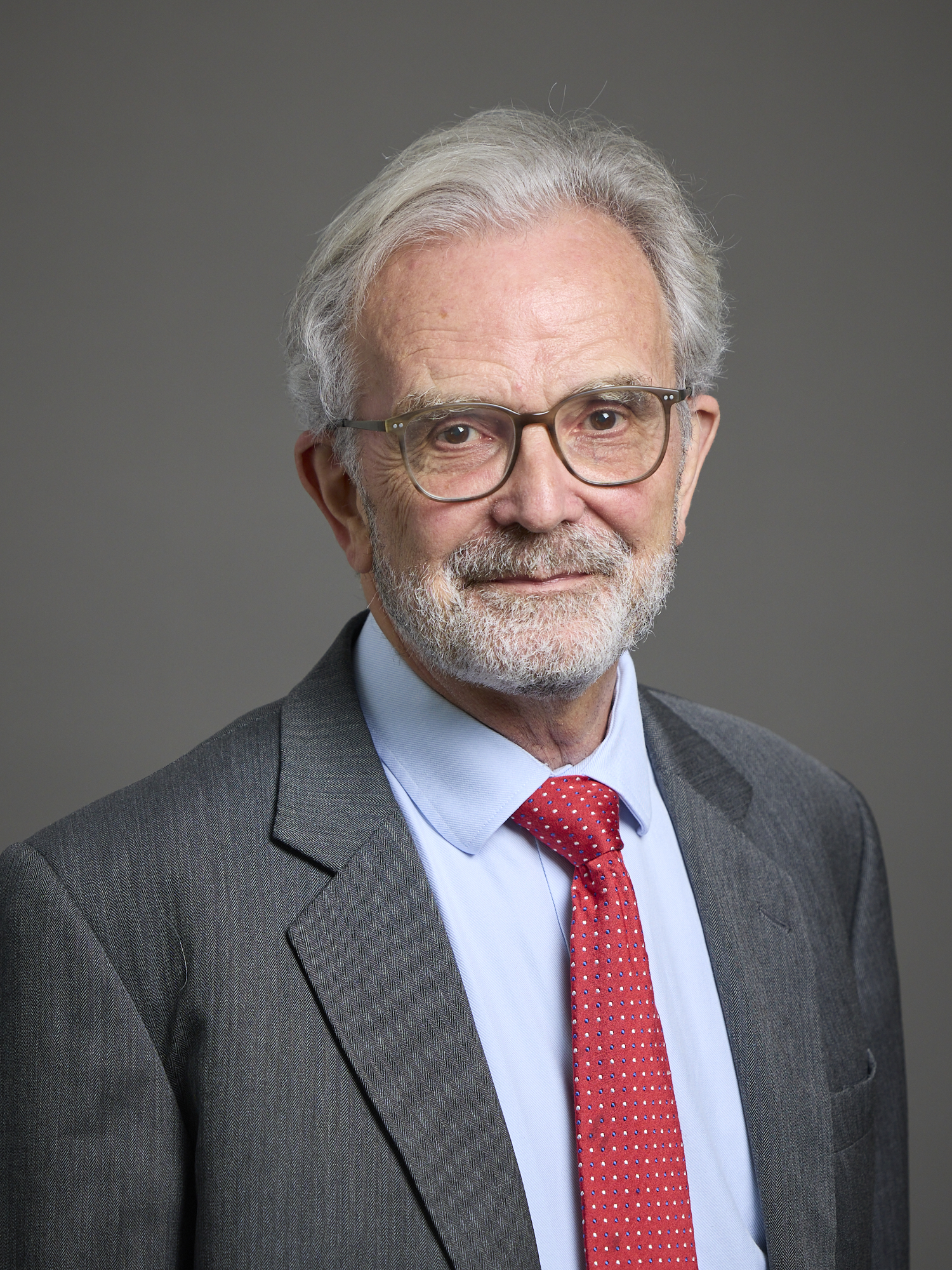
- Official portrait, 2026

Parliamentary Secretary for the Treasury
- Incumbent
- Assumed office 22 July 2026 Serving with Torsten Bell
- Prime Minister: Andy Burnham

Member of the House of Lords
- Lord Temporal
- Life peerage 15 January 2026

Personal details
- Born: David James Pitt-Watson; September 1956 (age 70) Aberdeen, Scotland
- Party: Labour
- Spouse: Ursula Barnes (m. 1989)
- Children: 3
- Education: Queen's College, Oxford (BA); Stanford University (MBA)
- Website: pitt-watson.com/

David James Pitt-Watson, Baron Pitt-Watson is a Scottish business and social entrepreneur, author, and life peer. He is a Fellow at Cambridge Judge Business School, and has been active in various initiatives to promote responsible investment. He chairs the CDC Forum, a community interest company, nurtured by the Royal Society of Arts. He was nominated to the House of Lords in December 2025.

== Personal life ==
=== Early life ===
Born in 1956 in Aberdeen, Scotland, he is the son of Ian Pitt-Watson, a minister of the Church of Scotland, and Helen Pitt-Watson. He has two sisters. His grandfather was James Pitt-Watson, Moderator of the General Assembly of the Church of Scotland in 1953.

=== Education ===
Pitt-Watson was educated at Bearsden Academy and Aberdeen Grammar School and then at Queen's College, Oxford where he studied Politics, Philosophy and Economics. He went on to win a scholarship from the Rotary Foundation to Stanford University Graduate School of Business, where he graduated with a MBA in 1980.

== Career ==
After short periods of work at 3i and McKinsey Pitt-Watson helped establish and was ultimately managing director of Braxton Associates Limited. He worked there for 17 years during which time it was bought by Deloitte and became Deloitte Consulting. Pitt-Watson was a partner at Deloitte for 12 years advising company boards and international agencies on strategy and competitiveness.

He left that position in 1997 to become Assistant General Secretary of the Labour Party, a post he held for two years before joining Hermes Fund Managers (now Federated Hermes) as commercial director of their newly formed shareholder activist funds.

These funds, known as the Focus Funds, grew to be the largest of their kind in Europe. Pitt-Watson became head of the funds and a director of Hermes in 2004, where he founded its Equity Ownership Service, a service to pension funds which aims to ensure that shares they own are used to promote good management practice and sustainable investment. By 2025 HEOS advised on over $2,000bn worth of assets. Hermes interventions have led to the successful turnaround of some of the country's largest companies.

After leaving Hermes, Pitt-Watson served numerous commercial roles, including as an independent non-executive at KPMG and as an advisor to Aviva Investors and Sarasin & Partners LLP.

For many years he has advised policy makers of all parties, including Tony Blair and Gordon Brown, on issues of industrial and financial policy, corporate governance and financial market regulation. He was a member of the cross-party Future of Banking Commission, chaired by David Davis, and the Sharman Commission relating to the use of the Going Concern rules.

== Author ==
Pitt-Watson co-authored What They Do With Your Money with Stephen Davis and Jon Lukomnik, published by Yale University Press in 2016. It describes how the financial system, whose services are essential to the economy, has become dysfunctional, and how this problem can be addressed.

With Davis and Lukomnik, he also wrote The New Capitalists, which describes how structures of corporate governance can help ensure companies work in the interest of the millions of individuals who own their shares. It was published in November 2006 by Harvard Business School Press and translated into five languages. He also co-authored with Carol Scott Leonard, Privatisation and Transition in Russia in the Early 1990s, based on his experience as a strategic adviser to the World Bank.

Pitt-Watson is the author of The Hermes Principles, which lays out the expectations of Hermes of the companies in which it invests, and forms the rationale for Hermes interventions in under performing companies.

Together with these publications, Pitt-Watson has written numerous papers and articles, and has been a regular contributor to British newspapers.

== Charity work and public service ==
Pitt-Watson chaired the UN Environment Programme's Finance Initiative, in the run up to the 2015 United Nations Climate Change Conference in Paris. He was a trustee and treasurer of Oxfam GB from 2011– 2017, where he had been closely involved in helping to establish its Enterprise Development Programme. Pitt-Watson was a trustee of Nesta, the innovation charity where he chaired its £400million endowment and of the Institute for Public Policy Research.

At the Royal Society for the Encouragement of Arts, Manufactures & Commerce (The RSA) he established the Tomorrow's Investor programme which was influential in raising the debate and achieving a consensus for reform to improve the structures, costs and transparency of pensions in Britain, most particularly in promoting pensions which give an income-for-life.

In February 2000 he helped initiate and served on the Co-operative Commission which aimed to help revive the fortunes of the UK Co-operative movement.

Pitt-Watson was also a councillor on Westminster City Council, for the Maida Vale ward, from 1986 to 1990. In December 2025, as part of the 2025 Political Peerages, Pitt-Watson was nominated for a life peerage to sit in the House of Lords as a Labour peer; he was created as Lord Pitt-Watson, of Kirkland of Glencairn in the County of Dumfriesshire on 15 January 2025.

== Academic appointments ==
In addition to his Fellowship at Cambridge, Pitt-Watson held the Pembroke Visiting Professorship in 2018. He was Executive Fellow at London Business School from 2012 to 2017 and Visiting Professor of Strategic Management at Cranfield University School of Management from 1990 to 1996.
