= John Moore-Brabazon, 1st Baron Brabazon of Tara =

English aviation pioneer and politician (1884–1964)

Lieutenant Colonel The Right Honourable The Lord Brabazon of Tara GBE, MC, PC, HonFRPS
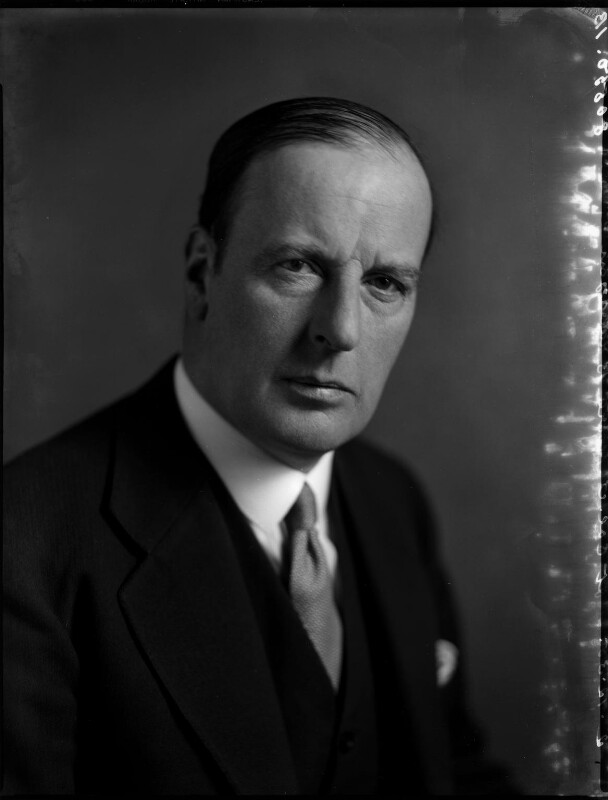
- Moore-Brabazon in 1935

Minister of Aircraft Production
- In office 1 May 1941 – 22 February 1942
- Monarch: George VI
- Prime Minister: Winston Churchill
- Preceded by: The Lord Beaverbrook
- Succeeded by: John Llewellin

Minister of Transport
- In office 3 October 1940 – 1 May 1941
- Monarch: George VI
- Prime Minister: Winston Churchill
- Preceded by: John Reith
- Succeeded by: The Lord Leathers

Parliamentary Secretary to the Ministry of Transport
- In office 11 November 1924 – 14 January 1927
- Monarch: George V
- Prime Minister: Stanley Baldwin
- Preceded by: Himself
- Succeeded by: The 2nd Earl Russell
- In office 8 October 1923 – 22 January 1924
- Monarch: George V
- Prime Minister: Stanley Baldwin
- Preceded by: Wilfrid Ashley
- Succeeded by: No appointment until November 1924

Member of the House of Lords Lord Temporal
- In office 27 April 1942 – 17 May 1964; Hereditary peerage
- Preceded by: Peerage created
- Succeeded by: The 2nd Baron Brabazon of Tara

Member of Parliament for Wallasey
- In office 27 October 1931 – 27 April 1942
- Preceded by: Robert Burton-Chadwick
- Succeeded by: George Reakes

Member of Parliament for Chatham
- In office 14 December 1918 – 10 May 1929
- Preceded by: Gerald Hohler
- Succeeded by: Frank Markham

Personal details
- Born: 8 February 1884 London, England
- Died: 17 May 1964 (aged 80) Longcross, Surrey, England
- Party: Conservative

Military service
- Allegiance: United Kingdom
- Branch/service: British Army; Royal Air Force
- Years of service: 1914–1919
- Rank: Lieutenant Colonel
- Battles/wars: World War I
- Awards: Military Cross; Mentioned in Despatches (2); Knight of the Legion of Honour (France)

Lieutenant Colonel John Theodore Cuthbert Moore-Brabazon, 1st Baron Brabazon of Tara, GBE, MC, PC, HonFRPS (8 February 1884 – 17 May 1964) was an English aviation pioneer and Conservative politician. He was the first Englishman to pilot a heavier-than-air machine under power in England, and he served as Minister of Transport and Minister of Aircraft Production during the Second World War.

== Early life ==
Moore-Brabazon was born in London to Lieutenant Colonel John Arthur Henry Moore-Brabazon (1828–1908) and his wife, Emma Sophia née Richards (died 1937). He was educated at Harrow School before studying engineering at Trinity College, Cambridge, but did not graduate. He spent university holidays working for Charles Rolls as an unpaid mechanic, and became an apprentice at Darracq in Paris after leaving Cambridge. In 1907 he won the Circuit des Ardennes in a Minerva.

== Pioneer aviator ==
Moore-Brabazon first flew solo in November 1908 in France in a Voisin biplane. He became the first resident Englishman to make an officially recognised aeroplane flight in England on 2 May 1909, at Shellbeach on the Isle of Sheppey with flights of 450 ft, 600 ft, and 1500 ft. On 4 May 1909, Moore-Brabazon was photographed outside the Royal Aero Club clubhouse Mussell Manor (now Muswell Manor Holiday Park) alongside the Wright Brothers, the Short Brothers, Charles Rolls, and many other early aviation pioneers. In 1909 he sold his Voisin 1907 biplane named Bird of Passage to Arthur Edward George, who learned to fly in it at the Royal Aero Club's flying-ground at Shellbeach; he then bought a Short Brothers-built Wright biplane, Short Biplane No. 2. A documentary, A Dream of Flight, was made in 2009 to celebrate the centenary of his achievement on the Isle of Sheppey.

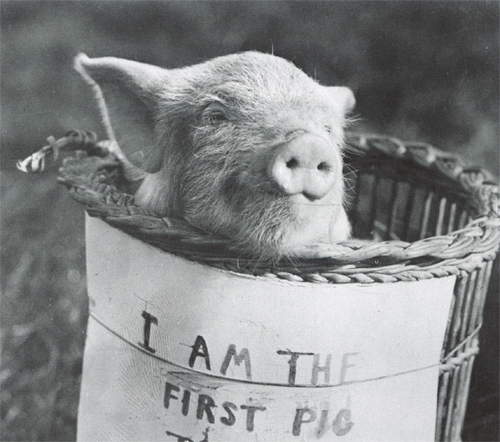
On 4 November 1909, as a joke to prove that pigs could fly, John Moore-Brabazon put a small pig in a waste-paper basket tied to a wing strut of his Voisin aeroplane.

On 30 October 1909, flying the Short Biplane No. 2, he flew a circular mile and won a £1,000 prize offered by the Daily Mail newspaper. On 4 November 1909, as a joke to prove that pigs could fly, he put a small pig in a waste-paper basket tied to a wing strut of his aeroplane. This may have been the first live cargo flight by aeroplane. With Charles Rolls, he would later make the first ascent in a spherical gas balloon of English manufacture (by the Short brothers).

On 8 March 1910, Moore-Brabazon became the first person to qualify as a pilot in the United Kingdom and was awarded Royal Aero Club Aviator's Certificate number 1; his car also bore the number plate FLY 1. However, only four months later, his friend Charles Rolls was killed in a flying accident and Moore-Brabazon's wife persuaded him to give up flying.

== First World War ==
On the outbreak of war, Moore-Brabazon returned to flying, joining the Royal Flying Corps (RFC). He received a special-reserve commission as a Second Lieutenant (on probation) in the RFC on 2 December 1914, in the appointment of flying officer (assistant equipment officer), and was confirmed in his rank on 11 February 1915. He was promoted Lieutenant on 19 February 1915 and was appointed an equipment officer on 31 March with the temporary rank of Captain. On 1 September 1915, he was promoted to the substantive rank of Captain, with a special temporary promotion to Major on 18 May 1916.

He served on the Western Front, where he played a key role in the development of aerial photography and reconnaissance. On 1 April 1918, when the Royal Flying Corps merged with the Royal Naval Air Service to form the Royal Air Force, Moore-Brabazon was appointed as a staff officer (first class) and made a temporary Lieutenant-Colonel. He was promoted to the substantive rank of Lieutenant-Colonel in the RAF on 1 January 1919 in recognition of his wartime services, relinquishing his commission that year.

Moore-Brabazon finished the war with the rank of Lieutenant Colonel. He was decorated with the Military Cross on 1 January 1917, and was also twice mentioned in despatches, on 15 October 1915 and on 13 November 1916. He was further decorated as a Knight of the Legion of Honour in February 1916.

== Pioneer yachtsman ==
In 1934 Moore-Brabazon fitted a gyro-rig to a Bembridge Redwing, an Isle of Wight class of yacht that allows and encourages the development of different rigs. The area of the rotating blades complies with the sail area limits of the class and are painted red, also to comply with the class rules. The boat was, and remains, dangerous, but it was probably the first auto-gyro boat. The boat is currently in the collection of the Classic Boat Museum at East Cowes, Isle of Wight, and still 'sails'.

== Conservative MP ==
Moore-Brabazon later became a Conservative Member of Parliament (MP) for Chatham (1918–1929) and Wallasey (1931–1942) and served as a junior minister in the 1920s. In 1931 and 1932 he served as a member of the London County Council. He was strongly opposed to war with Nazi Germany and in early 1939, when war seemed imminent, he made contact with Oswald Mosley in an attempt to co-ordinate activity against the war.

Despite his earlier anti-war agitation, in Winston Churchill's wartime government, he was appointed Minister of Transport in October 1940 and joined the Privy Council, becoming Minister of Aircraft Production in May 1941. As the Minister of Transport he proposed the use of Airgraphs to reduce the weight and bulk of mails travelling between troops fighting in the Middle East and their families in the UK. He was forced to resign in 1942 for expressing the hope that Germany and the Soviet Union, then engaged in the Battle of Stalingrad, would destroy each other. Since the Soviet Union was fighting the war on the same side as Britain, the hope that it should be destroyed, though widely shared in the Conservative Party, was unacceptable to the war effort.

== Later life ==
Moore-Brabazon was elevated to the House of Lords as Baron Brabazon of Tara, of Sandwich in the County of Kent, in April 1942. In 1943 he chaired the Brabazon Committee which planned to develop the post-war British aircraft industry. He was involved in the production of the Bristol Brabazon, a giant airliner that first flew on 4 September 1949. It was then, and still is, the largest aeroplane built entirely in Britain, although only one example was built and it was a very expensive failure Britain could not afford.

In 1949, when the House of Lords Yacht Club was established, Brabazon was its first Commodore.

A keen golfer, Moore-Brabazon introduced the golf trolley to Britain "amid much genial ridicule", and was captain of the Royal and Ancient Golf Club of St Andrews, the governing body of golf, from 1952 to 1953.

In 1955, then 71 years old, he won the Cresta Run Coronation Cup at an average speed of 71 km/h (44 mph).

His autobiography The Brabazon Story was published in 1956 by William Heinemann.

Moore-Brabazon was president of the Royal Aero Club, receiving its gold medal in 1958, president of the Royal Institution, chairman of the Air Registration Board, and president of the Middlesex County Automobile Club from 1946 until his death in 1964. He was appointed a Knight Grand Cross of the Order of the British Empire in 1953. In 1960 he presented the Brabazon Cup to the British Women Pilots' Association, to be given for achievements in aviation. The first recipient was Yvonne Pope.

On 27 November 1906, he married Hilda Mary Krabbé, with whom he had two sons. He was succeeded by his eldest son, Derek.

Moore-Brabazon is buried in Stoke Poges Memorial Gardens, Buckinghamshire.

Parliament of the United Kingdom
Preceded by Gerald Hohler	Member of Parliament for Chatham; 1918–1929	Succeeded by Frank Markham
Preceded by Robert Chadwick	Member of Parliament for Wallasey; 1931–1942	Succeeded by George Reakes
Political offices
Preceded by John Reith	Minister of Transport; 1940–1941	Succeeded by Frederick Leathers as Minister of War Transport
Preceded by The Lord Beaverbrook	Minister of Aircraft Production; 1941–1942	Succeeded by John Llewellin
Peerage of the United Kingdom
New creation	Baron Brabazon of Tara; 1942–1964	Succeeded by Derek Moore-Brabazon
