= Classic Boat Museum =

Maritime museum in England

Coordinates: 50.76035°N 1.289048°W

The Classic Boat Museum is a museum of boats and of the history of yachting and boating. It is located on the Isle of Wight on the West side of the River Medina. It is a working museum featuring restoration. Work takes place all year round. In addition to classic boats, the museum contains tools, artefacts, books, photographs, film and archival items that relate to the history of boat building, sailing, yachting, cruising and racing over the last century.

== The Boat Collection ==
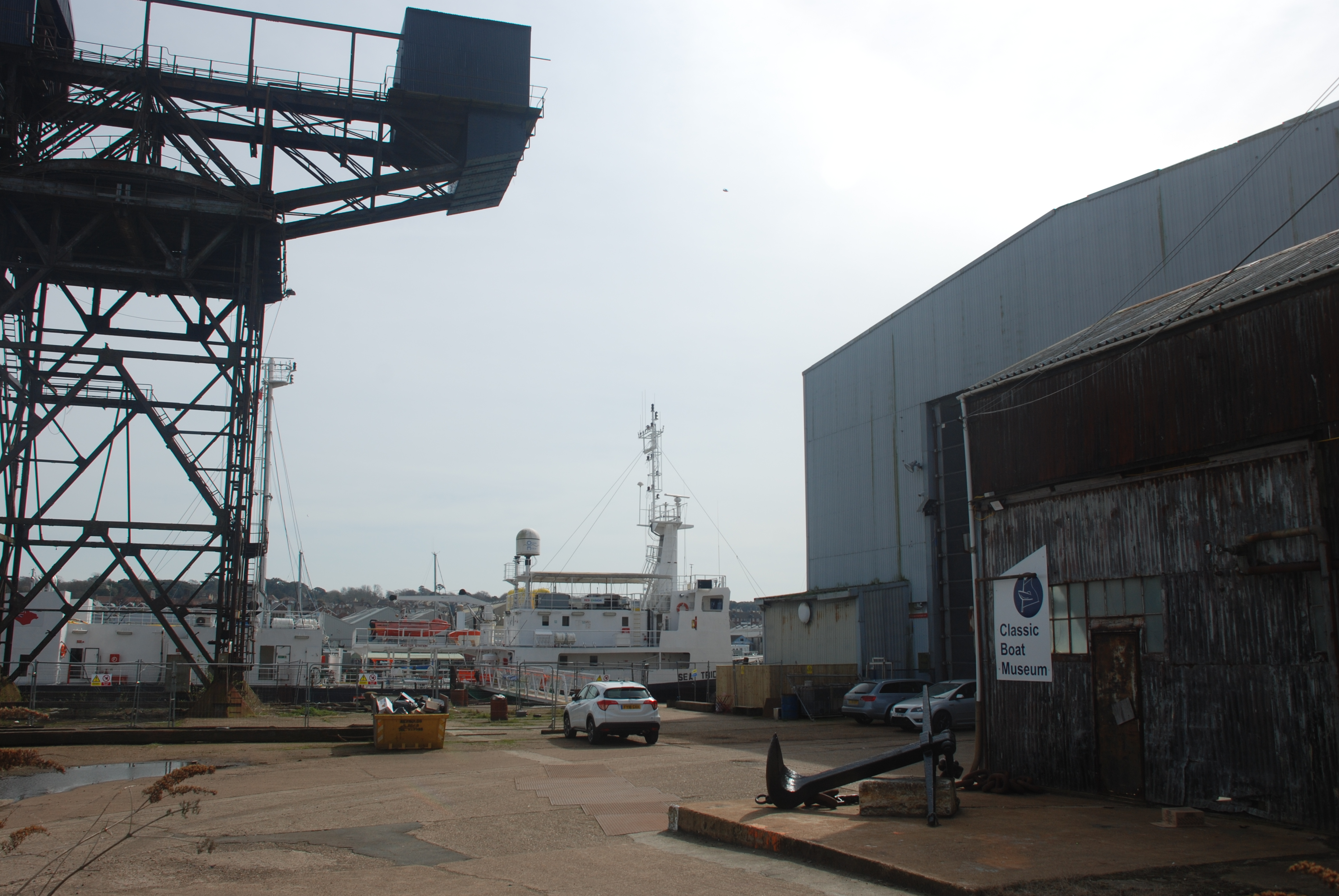
The Classic Boat Museum beside the historic Hammerhead Crane

The collection includes varied types of boat, most made from wood, that have now been restored. In addition to the main exhibits, there are also smaller boats on display including dinghies, canoes and rowing boats.

- Flying Spray - A now restored 1920's river launch. It was found holed and rotting in a Thames backwater. Since restoration the boat has attended several rallies in France, Germany and Switzerland and recently won the Concours d'Elegance at a French regatta in Aix-les-Bains.
- Airborne Lifeboat - A Mark 1 version of Uffa Fox's 1943 Air/Sea Rescue design. The Mark 1 was carried and dropped by parachute from a Lockheed Hudson aircraft. Mark 1A boats used the larger Vickers Warwick. Later and larger versions used Lancasters and B-17s. These boats were dropped to airmen who had ditched in the English Channel and the North Sea during World War II. It is estimated that these boats saved around 200-300 lives. The boat carried sufficient stores of food, water, fuel and clothing for a month at sea. A rescued crew was able to sail, motor or row home. This early example underwent a two-year restoration programme to restore it to its original specification after being dug out from a garden in Colchester. Airborne lifeboats were eventually replaced by helicopters in the 1950s.
- Sopranino - This is the famous first example of an offshore mini cruiser/racer and was the foundation of the present day Junior Offshore Group fleet. In 1952 she was sailed across the Atlantic by Patrick Ellam and Colin Mudie and was later found in a poor state in the USA. She was purchased for $1 and returned home for restoration.
- Kestrel - An early Bembridge Redwing. In 1934 Lord Brabazon of Tara fitted a rotating aerofoil rig, swivelling mast and a brake at the masthead. Its design is unique.
- Rosabelle - A launch (restored 2011) from which Frank William Beken took famous sailing photos that can be seen worldwide today.
- Vigia - This historic Una Catboat awaiting restoration is the latest acquisition by the museum and was donated by the family whose care she has been under for over 70 years. She was built in Cowes in 1872 and is thought to be the oldest English registered pleasure yacht to be still sailing.
- Black Bess - An 1870 Itchen ferry. The boat carries the name of the museum on her sail to many regattas during the summer.
