= Wallasey (constituency) =

Parliamentary constituency in the United Kingdom, 1918 onwards

Coordinates: 53.4184°N 3.0742°W

- Borough constituency for the House of Commons
- Interactive map of boundaries since 2024
- Location within North West England
- County: Merseyside
- Electorate: 73,054 (March 2020)
- Major settlements: Wallasey, Seacombe, New Brighton, Liscard, Leasowe and Moreton

Current constituency
- Created: 1918
- Member of Parliament: Angela Eagle (Labour)
- Seats: One
- Created from: Wirral (parts of) and Birkenhead

Wallasey is a constituency (Note: A borough constituency (for the purposes of election expenses and type of returning officer)) in Merseyside created in 1918 and represented in the House of Commons of the UK Parliament since 1992 by Dame Angela Eagle, a member of the Labour Party. (Note: As with all constituencies, the constituency elects one Member of Parliament (MP) by the first past the post system of election at least every five years.) She has served as Secretary of State for Environment, Food and Rural Affairs since 2026.

== Constituency profile ==
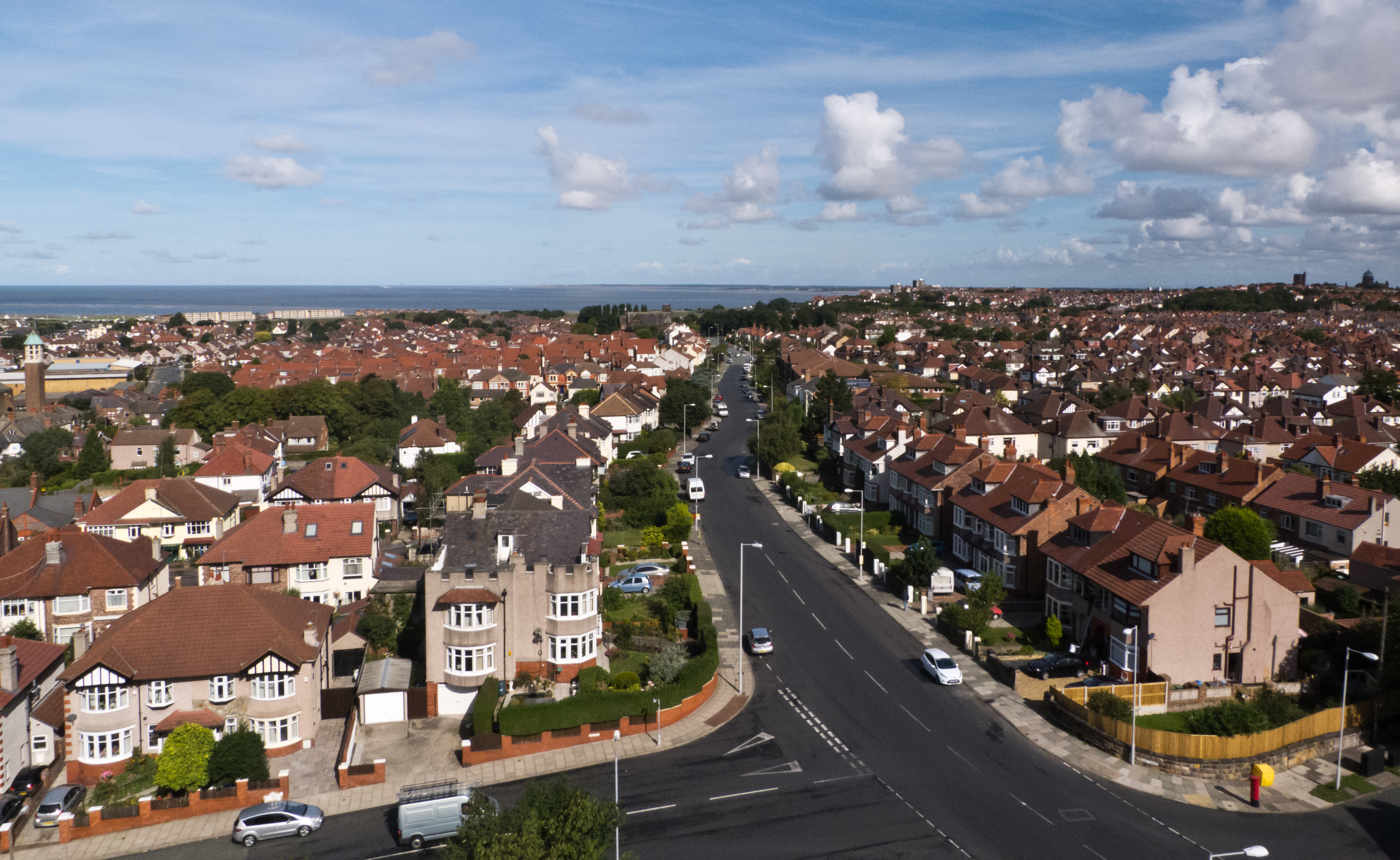
Wallasey

Wallasey is a constituency in Merseyside in North West England. It covers the towns of Wallasey and Moreton and the villages of Leasowe and Upton.

This constituency is located on the Wirral Peninsula, covering the connected towns and villages immediately north of Birkenhead. Wallasey lies on the opposite bank of the River Mersey from Liverpool and is connected to the city by the Kingsway Tunnel. Wallasey grew from the shipbuilding and engineering industries during the mid-19th century. It later became a popular seaside resort serving the industrial towns of Lancashire. The decline of industry and domestic tourism has left Wallasey highly-deprived today; most residents of the town live in dense terraced houses, many of which are socially rented. There are also high levels of deprivation in Leasowe and Moreton, whilst Upton and the northern neighbourhoods of Wallasey are wealthier and suburban in character. House prices across the constituency are generally lower than the rest of North West England, and the average price is less than half the overall UK average.

Wallasey has a low proportion of young adults and an above-average retired population. Residents have low rates of income, average levels of homeownership and above-average rates of child poverty. They have low levels of education and a high proportion work in the health, education and construction sectors. The percentage of residents claiming unemployment benefits is in line with the UK-wide rate. White people made up 96% of the population at the 2021 census.

At the local borough council, most of this constituency is represented by the Labour Party with some Conservatives elected in the Wallasey and Moreton suburbs. An estimated 53% of voters across the Wallasey constituency supported leaving the European Union in the 2016 referendum, similar to the UK-wide figure of 52%.

== Boundaries ==
=== Historic ===
1918–1950: The County Borough of Wallasey.

1950–1983: As prior but with redrawn boundaries.

1983–2010: The Metropolitan Borough of Wirral wards of Leasowe, Liscard, Moreton, New Brighton, Seacombe, and Wallasey. The constituency boundaries remained unchanged.

Map of 2010–2024 boundaries

2010–2024: The Metropolitan Borough of Wirral wards of Leasowe and Moreton East, Liscard, Moreton West and Saughall Massie, New Brighton, Seacombe, and Wallasey. The constituency's borders remain unchanged.

Minor 2010 boundary reform and abortive proposals

The Boundary Commission initially proposed the abolition in its 2005 draft review: Wallasey was to have been linked with sections of the city of Liverpool in a cross-river constituency. (Note: Proposed to contain the Liverpool wards of Everton and Kirkdale and the four Wirral wards Wallasey, New Brighton, Seacombe and Liscard.) The areas are linked only by a road tunnel under the river Mersey. Following opposition from political parties, local MPs and local residents, the sub-plan was dropped. The change made was the omission of a 40 electors' sub-neighbourhood from formerly shared ward: Hoylake and Meols in favour of Wirral West.

=== Current ===
Further to the 2023 review of Westminster constituencies, which came into effect for the 2024 general election, the boundaries were expanded to bring the electorate within the permitted range by transferring from Wirral West the northern half (polling districts MA and MB) of the Wirral Borough ward of Upton.

The constituency covers the town of Wallasey, at the north of the Wirral Peninsula, which comprises the six areas: Wallasey Village, Seacombe, Egremont, Liscard, New Brighton and Poulton, as well as Moreton and Leasowe. It is one of four constituencies covering the Metropolitan Borough of Wirral.

== History ==
The seat was created under the Representation of the People Act 1918.

Summary of results

Angela Eagle of the Labour Party gained the Wallasey seat in 1992. Eagle has achieved an absolute majority of votes since the 1997 general election inclusive. The 2015 result made the seat the 39-safest of Labour's 232 seats by percentage of majority.

The seat was Conservative until 1992, with a three-year exception during World War II when represented by an ex-mayor who had been in both the Labour and Conservative parties. Increasing unemployment in the area saw the Conservative vote decline throughout the 1980s in local and general elections, only retaining Moreton West & Saughall Massie and Wallasey wards on the local level into the 2010s, with the remaining wards such as Leasowe and Seacombe safely Labour.

Opposition parties

A Conservative candidate was runner-up in the elections from 1992 to 2019 inclusive. In the 2024 election the runner-up was the Reform Party candidate. Weaker in Wallasey than national average, in 2015 the candidate from UKIP, Caton, amassed +8.8% swing. (Note: UKIP's swing nationally was +9.5% in 2015) Liberal Democrat, Brown, lost 11.3% of the vote in that year, whereas nationally the party suffered a record −15.2% swing. Neither Brown nor his Green Party counterpart achieved more than 5% of the vote thereby forfeiting their deposits.

Turnout

Turnout has ranged from 82.6% in 1992 to 57.5% in 2001 — elections at which Angela Eagle was elected, and the latter election saw record-low turnout nationwide.

=== Prominent frontbenchers ===
Rt Hon Ernest Marples was Postmaster General while running the telephone network run by the General Post Office, Marples introduced subscriber trunk dialling, which eliminated the compulsory use of operators on national phone calls. On 2 June 1957, Marples brought in British postcodes and made the first draw for the new Premium Bonds. Marples was Minister of Transport (1959–1964).

His successor to the seat was the Rt Hon Lynda Chalker Minister for Europe (1986–1989) and Minister for Overseas Development (1989–1997).

Angela Eagle was Exchequer Secretary to the Treasury for two years then Minister for Pensions and Ageing Society for a year at the close of the Brown Ministry, before becoming in opposition Shadow Chief Secretary to the Treasury until October 2011, when in the general Shadow Cabinet reshuffle of Ed Miliband, she succeeded the Rt Hon Hilary Benn as Shadow Leader of the House of Commons. She unsuccessfully stood for Deputy Leadership of the Labour Party in 2015 and subsequently was appointed as Shadow Secretary of State for Business, Innovation and Skills by Jeremy Corbyn. After Labour returned to power in 2024, she was appointed Minister of State for Border Security and Asylum in 2024, Minister of State for Food Security and Rural Affairs in 2025 and Secretary of State for Environment, Food and Rural Affairs since 2026.

== Members of Parliament ==
Election	Member	Party
1918	Bouverie McDonald	Coalition Conservative
1922	Robert Chadwick	Conservative
1931	John Moore-Brabazon	Conservative
1942 by-election	George Reakes	Independent
1945	Ernest Marples	Conservative
Feb 1974	Lynda Chalker	Conservative
1992	Angela Eagle	Labour

== Elections ==
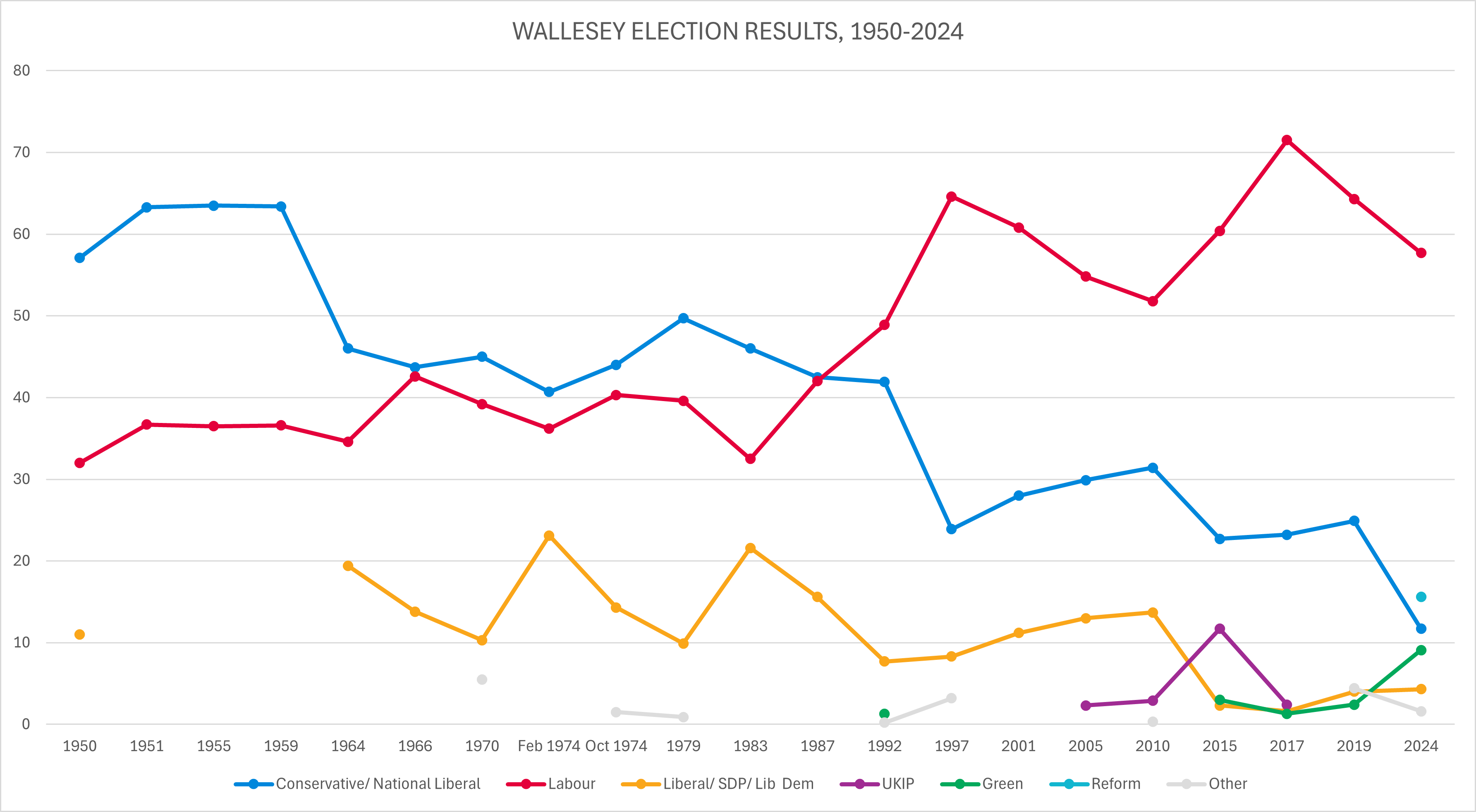
Election results 1950-2024

=== Elections in the 2020s ===
General election 2024: Wallasey
Party	Candidate	Votes	%	±%
Labour	Angela Eagle	24,674	57.7	−6.0
Reform	David Burgess-Joyce	6,678	15.6	+11.5
Conservative	Robbie Lammas	4,987	11.7	−14.2
Green	Jane Turner	3,905	9.1	+6.7
Liberal Democrats	Vicky Downie	1,843	4.3	+0.4
Workers Party	Philip Bimpson	462	1.1	N/A
Freedom Alliance	Ian Pugh	197	0.5	N/A
Rejected ballots		168		
Majority		17,996	42.1	+4.4
Turnout		42,746	57.7	−12.8
Registered electors		74,082		
Labour hold		Swing	▼8.7	

Changes are from the notional 2019 results on the 2024 boundaries.

=== Elections in the 2010s ===
2019 notional result
Party	Vote	%
Labour	32,769	63.7
Conservative	13,347	25.9
Brexit Party	2,128	4.1
Liberal Democrats	2,007	3.9
Green	1,219	2.4
Turnout	51,470	70.5
Electorate	73,054	

General election 2019: Wallasey
Party	Candidate	Votes	%	±%
Labour	Angela Eagle	29,901	64.3	–7.2
Conservative	James Baker	11,579	24.9	+1.7
Brexit Party	Martin York	2,037	4.4	N/A
Liberal Democrats	Vicky Downie	1,843	4.0	+2.4
Green	Lily Clough	1,132	2.4	+1.1
Majority		18,322	39.4	–8.9
Turnout		46,492	70.1	–1.6
Labour hold		Swing	–4.4	

General election 2017: Wallasey
Party	Candidate	Votes	%	±%
Labour	Angela Eagle	34,552	71.5	+11.1
Conservative	Andy Livsey	11,232	23.2	+0.5
UKIP	Debbie Caplin	1,160	2.4	–9.3
Liberal Democrats	Paul Childs	772	1.6	–0.7
Green	Lily Clough	637	1.3	–1.7
Majority		23,320	48.3	+10.6
Turnout		48,353	71.7	+5.5
Labour hold		Swing	+5.3	

General election 2015: Wallasey
Party	Candidate	Votes	%	±%
Labour	Angela Eagle	26,176	60.4	+8.6
Conservative	Chris Clarkson	9,828	22.7	–8.7
UKIP	Geoffrey Caton	5,063	11.7	+8.8
Green	Julian Pratt	1,288	3.0	N/A
Liberal Democrats	Kris Brown	1,011	2.3	–11.4
Majority		16,348	37.7	+17.3
Turnout		43,366	66.2	+3.0
Labour hold		Swing	+8.6	

General election 2010: Wallasey
Party	Candidate	Votes	%	±%
Labour	Angela Eagle	21,578	51.8	–2.7
Conservative	Leah Fraser	13,071	31.4	+0.9
Liberal Democrats	Steve Pitt	5,693	13.7	+0.9
UKIP	Derek Snowden	1,205	2.9	+0.6
Independent	Emmanuel Mwaba	107	0.3	N/A
Majority		8,507	20.4	―3.6
Turnout		41,654	63.2	+5.4
Labour hold		Swing	–1.8	

=== Elections in the 2000s ===
General election 2005: Wallasey
Party	Candidate	Votes	%	±%
Labour	Angela Eagle	20,085	54.8	–6.0
Conservative	Leah Fraser	10,976	29.9	+1.9
Liberal Democrats	Joanna Pemberton	4,770	13.0	+1.8
UKIP	Philip Griffiths	840	2.3	N/A
Majority		9,109	24.9	–7.9
Turnout		36,671	57.5	–0.1
Labour hold		Swing	–4.0	

General election 2001: Wallasey
Party	Candidate	Votes	%	±%
Labour	Angela Eagle	22,718	60.8	–3.8
Conservative	Lesley Rennie	10,442	28.0	+4.1
Liberal Democrats	Peter Reisdorf	4,186	11.2	+2.9
Majority		12,276	32.8	–7.9
Turnout		37,346	57.6	–16.2
Labour hold		Swing	–4.0	

=== Elections in the 1990s ===
General election 1997: Wallasey
Party	Candidate	Votes	%	±%
Labour	Angela Eagle	30,264	64.6	+15.7
Conservative	Madelaine Wilcock	11,190	23.9	–18.0
Liberal Democrats	Peter Reisdorf	3,899	8.3	+0.6
Referendum	Roger Hayes	1,490	3.2	N/A
Majority		19,074	40.7	+33.7
Turnout		46,843	73.8	–8.8
Labour hold		Swing	+16.9	

General election 1992: Wallasey
Party	Candidate	Votes	%	±%
Labour	Angela Eagle	26,531	48.9	+6.9
Conservative	Lynda Chalker	22,722	41.9	–0.6
Liberal Democrats	Neil Thomas	4,177	7.7	–7.9
Green	Sally Davis	680	1.3	N/A
Natural Law	Geoffrey Gay	105	0.2	N/A
Majority		3,809	7.0	N/A
Turnout		54,215	82.6	+2.8
Labour gain from Conservative		Swing	+3.8	

=== Elections in the 1980s ===
General election 1987: Wallasey
Party	Candidate	Votes	%	±%
Conservative	Lynda Chalker	22,791	42.5	–3.5
Labour	Lawrence Duffy	22,512	42.0	+9.5
SDP	Jonathan Richardson	8,363	15.6	–6.0
Majority		279	0.5	–13.0
Turnout		53,945	79.8	+7.2
Conservative hold		Swing	-6.5	

General election 1983: Wallasey
Party	Candidate	Votes	%	±%
Conservative	Lynda Chalker	22,854	46.0	–3.6
Labour Co-op	James Robertson	16,146	32.5	–7.1
SDP	Jonathan Richardson	10,717	21.6	N/A
Majority		6,708	13.5	+3.4
Turnout		49,717	72.6	–4.7
Conservative hold		Swing		

=== Elections in the 1970s ===
General election 1979: Wallasey
Party	Candidate	Votes	%	±%
Conservative	Lynda Chalker	26,548	49.65	
Labour	Hilary Hodge	21,167	39.58	
Liberal	Neil Thomas	5,269	9.85	
National Front	John Fishwick	491	0.92	
Majority		5,381	10.07	
Turnout		53,475	77.30	
Conservative hold		Swing		

General election October 1974: Wallasey
Party	Candidate	Votes	%	±%
Conservative	Lynda Chalker	23,499	43.96	
Labour	Gerald McNamara	21,529	40.27	
Liberal	Peter Tyrer	7,643	14.30	
National Front	John Fishwick	787	1.47	N/A
Majority		1,970	3.69	
Turnout		53,458	76.27	
Conservative hold		Swing		

General election February 1974: Wallasey
Party	Candidate	Votes	%	±%
Conservative	Lynda Chalker	22,428	40.71	
Labour	Robert Paterson	19,936	36.18	
Liberal	Peter Tyrer	12,734	23.11	
Majority		2,492	4.53	
Turnout		55,098	79.45	
Conservative hold		Swing		

General election 1970: Wallasey
Party	Candidate	Votes	%	±%
Conservative	Ernest Marples	24,283	44.99	
Labour	Clarence J Wells	21,172	39.22	
Liberal	David J Evans	5,577	10.33	
Anti-Common Market	John D Hill	2,946	5.46	N/A
Majority		3,111	5.77	
Turnout		53,978	74.87	
Conservative hold		Swing		

=== Elections in the 1960s ===
General election 1966: Wallasey
Party	Candidate	Votes	%	±%
Conservative	Ernest Marples	22,901	43.69	
Labour	Ronald G Truman	22,312	42.56	
Liberal	Gruffydd Evans	7,207	13.75	
Majority		589	1.13	
Turnout		52,420	76.06	
Conservative hold		Swing		

General election 1964: Wallasey
Party	Candidate	Votes	%	±%
Conservative	Ernest Marples	24,784	46.00	
Labour	Ian Levin	18,663	34.64	
Liberal	Gruffydd Evans	10,432	19.36	N/A
Majority		6,121	11.36	
Turnout		53,879	76.63	
Conservative hold		Swing		

=== Elections in the 1950s ===
General election 1959: Wallasey
Party	Candidate	Votes	%	±%
Conservative	Ernest Marples	35,567	63.44	
Labour	Gordon Woodburn	20,501	36.56	
Majority		15,066	26.88	
Turnout		56,068	77.16	
Conservative hold		Swing		

General election 1955: Wallasey
Party	Candidate	Votes	%	±%
Conservative	Ernest Marples	33,537	63.45	
Labour	William T Clements	19,319	36.55	
Majority		14,218	26.90	
Turnout		52,856	72.26	
Conservative hold		Swing		

General election 1951: Wallasey
Party	Candidate	Votes	%	±%
Conservative	Ernest Marples	37,423	63.28	
Labour	Fred Jarvis	21,718	36.72	
Majority		15,705	26.56	
Turnout		59,141	79.72	
Conservative hold		Swing		

General election 1950: Wallasey
Party	Candidate	Votes	%	±%
Conservative	Ernest Marples	33,904	57.08	
Labour	John London Hindle	18,989	31.97	
Liberal	Arthur Ward Jones	6,507	10.95	N/A
Majority		14,915	25.11	
Turnout		59,400	82.47	
Conservative hold		Swing		

=== Elections in the 1940s ===
General election 1945: Wallasey
Party	Candidate	Votes	%	±%
Conservative	Ernest Marples	18,448	42.94	
Independent	George Reakes	14,638	34.07	N/A
Labour Co-op	Thomas Findley	9,879	22.99	
Majority		3,810	8.87	
Turnout		42,965	75.23	
Conservative hold		Swing		

1942 Wallasey by-election
Party	Candidate	Votes	%	±%
Independent	George Reakes	11,596	58.6	N/A
Conservative	John Pennington	6,584	33.2	−34.2
Independent	Leonard Harrison Cripps	1,597	8.1	N/A
Majority		5,012	25.4	N/A
Turnout		19,777	34.2	−31.9
Independent gain from Conservative		Swing		

Notes

Moore-Brabazon was forced to retire early in 1942 for stating publicly (in fact in the House) the Soviet Union and Germany would hopefully destroy each other at the Battle of Stalingrad.

1939–40

Another general election was in normal circumstances required to take place before the end of 1940. The political parties had been making preparations for an election to take place from 1939 and by the end of this year, the following candidates had been selected;

- Conservative: John Moore-Brabazon
- Liberal: Robert Forster

=== Elections in the 1930s ===
General election 1935: Wallasey
Party	Candidate	Votes	%	±%
Conservative	John Moore-Brabazon	27,949	67.44	
Labour	John Airey	13,491	32.56	
Majority		14,458	34.88	
Turnout		41,440	66.1	
Conservative hold		Swing		

General election 1931: Wallasey
Party	Candidate	Votes	%	±%
Conservative	John Moore-Brabazon	40,161	83.89	
Labour	John Mack	7,712	16.11	
Majority		32,449	67.78	
Turnout		47,873	77.10	
Conservative hold		Swing		

=== Elections in the 1920s ===
General election 1929: Wallasey
Party	Candidate	Votes	%	±%
Unionist	Robert Burton-Chadwick	21,457	46.0	−26.4
Liberal	Hubert Phillips	13,628	29.2	N/A
Labour	John Mack	11,545	24.8	−2.8
Majority		7,829	16.8	−28.0
Turnout		46,630	77.6	+2.9
Registered electors		60,075		
Unionist hold		Swing		

General election 1924: Wallasey
Party	Candidate	Votes	%	±%
Unionist	Robert Burton-Chadwick	22,599	72.4	+20.8
Labour	John H. Warren	8,634	27.6	N/A
Majority		13,965	44.8	+41.6
Turnout		31,233	74.7	+7.5
Registered electors		41,816		
Unionist hold		Swing	+20.8	

General election 1923: Wallasey
Party	Candidate	Votes	%	±%
Unionist	Robert Burton-Chadwick	13,995	51.6	−12.1
Liberal	Tudor Morris	13,146	48.4	+12.1
Majority		849	3.2	−24.2
Turnout		27,141	67.2	−2.0
Registered electors		40,367		
Unionist hold		Swing	−12.1	

General election 1922: Wallasey
Party	Candidate	Votes	%	±%
Unionist	Robert Burton-Chadwick	17,508	63.7	+8.5
Liberal	Tudor Morris	9,984	36.3	+21.0
Majority		7,524	27.4	−11.2
Turnout		27,492	69.2	+6.4
Registered electors		39,737		
Unionist hold		Swing	−6.3	

=== Elections in the 1910s ===
General election 1918: Wallasey
Party		Candidate	Votes	%	±%
C	Unionist	Bouverie McDonald	14,633	55.2	
	Labour	Walter Citrine	4,384	16.6	
	Liberal	John Matthews Hay	4,055	15.3	
	NFDDSS	Thomas David Owen	3,407	12.9	
Majority			10,249	38.6	
Turnout			26,479	62.8	
Registered electors			42,174		
	Unionist win (new seat)				
C indicates candidate endorsed by the coalition government.

== See also ==
- List of parliamentary constituencies in Merseyside
- History of parliamentary constituencies and boundaries in Cheshire
