= 1942 Wallasey by-election =

UK parliamentary by-election

The 1942 Wallasey by-election was a parliamentary by-election for the British House of Commons constituency of Wallasey on 29 April 1942.

== Vacancy ==
The by-election was caused by the resignation of the sitting Unionist MP, and Government Minister, John Moore-Brabazon in April 1942. He was forced to resign for expressing the hope that Germany and the Soviet Union, then engaged in the Battle of Stalingrad, would destroy each other. Since the Soviet Union was fighting the war on the same side as Britain, the hope that it should be destroyed, though common in the Conservative Party, was unacceptable to the war effort. He had been MP here since winning the seat in 1931

== Previous result ==
Wallasey had been Conservative since it was created in 1918. The result at the last general election was:

General election 1935: Wallasey
Party	Candidate	Votes	%	±%
Conservative	John Moore-Brabazon	27,949	67.4	
Labour	John Airey	13,491	32.6	
Majority		14,458	34.8	
Turnout		41,440	66.1	
Conservative hold		Swing		

== Candidates ==
Local Conservatives were keen to have a local candidate and feared that the Wallasey Conservative Association would have an outsider foisted on them. They persuaded local Councillor and former Mayor, George Reakes to put his name forward, which he did, as an Independent. Reakes had been a member of the Labour Party but had left it when the mainstream parliamentary Labour party failed to call for rearmament, to face Nazi Germany. Though not an appeaser, he had publicly backed Neville Chamberlain's Munich Agreement. However some backing from local Conservatives may have benefited the eventual Conservative candidate, local alderman, J Pennington.

On the eve of war, with an election expect to follow no later than May 1940, the Liberal Party had already selected a candidate, Robert Forster, however the Labour Party had not decided upon one at that stage. In the event both parties were officially bound by the wartime electoral truce to publicly support the Conservative candidate (see Churchill war ministry) and did so.

A third candidate entered the field, in the form of the Independent, Major Leonard Cripps. Cripps was the younger brother of Sir Stafford Cripps, a well-known Labour frontbencher. Cripps had retired from military service and owned a shipbuilders in Liverpool, however, he did not have the support of his brother nor any of the activists in the local parties.

== Result ==
Wallasey by-election, 1942 Electorate 60,684
Party	Candidate	Votes	%	±%
Independent	George Reakes	12,596	60.6	N/A
Conservative	John Pennington	6,584	31.7	−35.7
Independent	Leonard Harrison Cripps	1,597	7.7	N/A
Majority		6,012	28.9	N/A
Turnout		20,777	34.2	−31.9
Independent gain from Conservative		Swing		

== Aftermath ==
The result at the following General election;

General election 1945 Electorate 57,113
Party	Candidate	Votes	%	±%
Conservative	Ernest Marples	18,448	42.9	
Independent	George Reakes	14,638	34.1	
Labour	Thomas Findley	9,879	23.0	
Majority		3,810	8.8	N/A
Turnout		42,965	75.2	
Conservative gain from Independent		Swing		

== See also ==
- List of United Kingdom by-elections (1931–1950)
- United Kingdom by-election records
