= Middlesex County Automobile Club =

Motor club in England

The Middlesex County Automobile Club is a motor club based in Rickmansworth, Hertfordshire.

== Formation ==
The club has its origins in early 1905, and the club records show that a small group of young businessmen and professionals met at The Fox Hotel, Palmers Green, north London, and decided to form a motor club, which they named The North London Car Club (NLCC). However, on finding that the North London Cycle Club was already in existence, they quickly changed the name to the North London Automobile Club (NLAC).

The club committee invited the most prominent personage in the district to be the first President of the club. Col. Henry Ferryman Bowles MA MP JP was a direct descendant of the 6th Earl of Macclesfield, a founder member of the Middlesex County Council, Chairman of the Enfield Bench, and Conservative Member of Parliament for the Enfield Division. Col. Bowles was to remain in office for 38 years, until his death in 1943. One of the first vice-presidents was The Hon. Rupert Guinness, heir to the Guinness brewing business, ADC to King George V and an MP. Another vice-president was Mr. A.W. Gamage, founder of the famous Gamages store in Holborn.

Initially, the NLAC was affiliated to the Motor Union (MU), a subsidiary of the Automobile Club of Great Britain (as the RAC was known at that time). However, at the end of 1907, the MU broke away from the RAC due to internal frictions. The RAC then announced a scheme whereby local clubs could become associates of the RAC, with representation on its committee. In January 1908, the NLAC changed its name to the North Middlesex AC (NMAC) and, on 1 January 1909, joined the RAC Associates scheme.

The first ever recorded motoring event took place on Saturday 27 May 1905. That was followed by a further eight such runs that year, including four Friday to Sunday weekend events. The first competitive event took place on Saturday 5 May 1906, and involved what would be known today as a Production Car Trial. It was won by the Hon. Secretary, Mr. Chas Smith, in his 12 hp Darracq.

On Saturday 19 May 1906, a speed-judging contest was the first co-promoted event, in conjunction with the Southern Car Club, for the Gamage Challenge Cup. Although this event was won by the Southern Car Club, the next three events held in succeeding years were won by the NMAC, and resulted in the club retaining the Gamage Cup in perpetuity. It is today the oldest cup in the club's collection.

On Saturday 16 May 1908 at Cat Hill (A110), Cockfosters, north London, the club became the first such organisation to receive written permission from the Commissioner of Police to hold a motoring competition on a public road. The event was won by Mr. Alfred Alexander in his 8 hp De Dion-Bouton, winning the President’s Cup.

In February 1910, a meeting was held at the Middlesex Guildhall. This public meeting was considered so important that the chairman of the Council made the Council Chamber available, and many important personages connected with the County Council, the motoring press and the RAC were in attendance. The purpose of the meeting was to consider a proposal suggested by the Council Chairman and supported by the Secretary of the RAC, Mr. Julian Orde, that the NMAC be reconstituted as the Middlesex County Automobile Club‘……so as to become the representative motoring organisation in the county’. The resolution was passed, and the MCAC came into being at the committee meeting held on 25 February 1910. In 1911, the Kensington AC was amalgamated with the MCAC, and several former officials joined the MCAC Committee.

In 1912, the Club entered a team in the RAC Associates Day at Brooklands and won The Autocar Cup in the 5-mile Relay Race. Mr. Malcolm Campbell, who was to play a large part in the Club’s activities in later years, won the All-comers Handicap race on that day.

With the advent of hostilities in 1914, pleasure motoring almost came to a complete standstill, although the Club did run a few events up to mid-1915. During the war, the Club’s standing committee adopted a very patriotic attitude, and did what it could for the war effort. With the cessation of hostilities, the Club quickly resumed activities, notwithstanding a fall in membership by some 50% since 1914, to around 200.

== Between the Wars ==
By 1920, the membership had recovered to around 300, and the Club resumed its work of making known the views of county’s motorists to the Middlesex County Council. By 1926, the Club was hosting a combined Speed Trial and Hill Climb at Brooklands, and these meetings attracted many well-known racing drivers of the era.

In the 1927 meeting, George Eyston, (winner of the 1926 Boulogne Grand Prix in a Bugatti) won the 50 Miles Handicap race and in the Hill Climb, club member Mrs Victor Bruce (at one time holder of 17 motoring world records) won the Ladies' Cup and Dr. Dudley Benjafield, one of the famous 'Bentley Boys' won the Kensington Cup for the fastest time, a trophy he was to win every year from 1926 to 1930, and again in 1932 (Dr. Benjafield joined the Club committee in 1927, and was active in club management until at least 1939). At the 1928 MCAC Brooklands meeting, Mrs. Bruce and Dr. Benjafield won their cups again, and Capt. Archibald Frazer-Nash was 3rd in the Middlesex Short Handicap. In 1929, the Club elected Capt. Malcolm Campbell as a Vice-president, and he remained a member until his death on 31 December 1948, having received his knighthood in 1931.

By the end of 1930, the Club had 852 members, and was already claiming to be the second largest such club in the UK. Its importance in the world of UK motor clubs was recognised by the RAC, which invited the MCAC to nominate a representative to be a permanent member on its Associates Committee, one of only five such clubs to receive this honour. By the 1930s, the Club’s political influence was declining, notwithstanding the presence as Vice-presidents of no less than 16 MPs representing all the constituencies in the County. However, its 18-member committee was organising as many as 15 events in most years. The most notable of these events was the 100 Miles Reliability Trial, that was held every year without a break (except during the war) from 1907 to 1939, taking competitors in this ‘closed-to-club’ event to all points of the compass within approximately 100 miles from home.

By 1939, the Club had 806 members. The final event for the year was the Village Seeking Competition held in July, that preceded the Closing Run & Speed Judging Competition scheduled for 16 September but cancelled. In October, the AGM was held as usual, but the Annual Dinner Dance and Awards Presentation was cancelled. With the outbreak of hostilities, the Club closed down for the duration of the war, although every year at least one committee meeting and an AGM was held, at which the 1939 Officers and Committee were re-elected annually en bloc. During this period of inactivity, the founding President, Col. Sir Henry Bowles died in 1943, and in March 1946 he was succeeded by Lord Brabazon of Tara.

== Post-War ==
By the start of 1946, there were just over 200 members, many of whom had joined solely for the benefits of RAC membership, that was offered at advantageous rates. But it was clear that motoring was no longer the preserve of the privileged and influential, and the appeal of motor clubs was to diminish dramatically in the post-war years. Like so many others, the Club entered into a long period of stagnation during the 1950s and 1960s, with very few events being organised due in part to petrol rationing, but most significantly to the introduction of new laws that severely reduced the ability to promote road rallies. As a result, many clubs closed down.

But the MCAC survived, by holding social functions and a few road events as and when petrol supplies allowed. These were supplemented by gymkhanas, driving tests and, towards the end of the 1960s, production car trials. The second President, Lord Brabazon, who had been so active and supportive in the club's affairs, died in 1964, and was succeeded by The Marquess of Donegall who was the senior Vice-president, and who instituted the annual Donegall Award.

== Rebirth ==
In 1969 a small group of active rallying enthusiasts decided to rebuild a scrapyard wreck into an entry to the 1970 RAC Rally. This event proved to be the revival catalyst that the Club had needed during the many years of relatively routine activity. It led to an almost uninterrupted record of individual and Club team entries in this annual event up to the present day, and the achievement of many class and team awards. Throughout all the years, the Club had never been able to promote periodic ‘noggin and natter’ gatherings with any regularity, although several attempts had been made, generally with poor response. However, the very many working-party sessions that took place during the first RAC Rally project led directly to the establishment of regular weekly social meetings that continue to this day.

In 1975, the third President died, and was succeeded by Neale Alexander, son of one of the founding members, a former Treasurer, Secretary and Vice-president for nearly 40 years, and a member of several RAC central committees for many years. Since the 1970s, the Club had experienced many changes affecting its activities. The fourth President died in 1986, and was succeeded by Adrian L’Estrange, a former Treasurer, Membership Secretary and Vice-president, who joined the Club in 1964. The most significant feature of this period has been the considerable activity by members in major national and international rallying events.

In 1982, the MCAC was the first UK motor club to enter a team (three cars) in the East African Safari Rally, and in 1986 two members competed in the Himalayan Rally, achieving 3rd and 4th placings. During the 1990s, several members were regular competitors in UK international and Belgian national events. In 2000, the Club entered no less than 10 members and three teams in the London-Sydney Marathon. Since 2003, the Club has participated in the Barbados Carnival Rally, and has co-promoted the South of England Tempest Rally.

As well as being affiliated to The Motor Sports Association, the Club has been for many years a member of the London Counties Association of Motor Clubs, the Association of Central Southern Motor Clubs, the Association of Eastern Motor Clubs and the Welsh Association of Motor Clubs. In December 2004, to conclude a century of motorsport, the Club co-promoted and ran the first single venue stage rally to be held at the Rockingham Motor Speedway- an event that ran until the closure of the Rockingham site in 2018 - with the 2018 Stages being the last ever competitive event at the Speedway. MCAC continues to promote stage rallying in the UK, including the popular Snetterton Stages, part of the MSN Circuit Rally Championship, and is currently working to run the first closed-roads stage rally in Hertfordshire in June 2022.
