= Michael Tomlinson =

British politician (born 1977)

The Right Honourable Michael Tomlinson KC
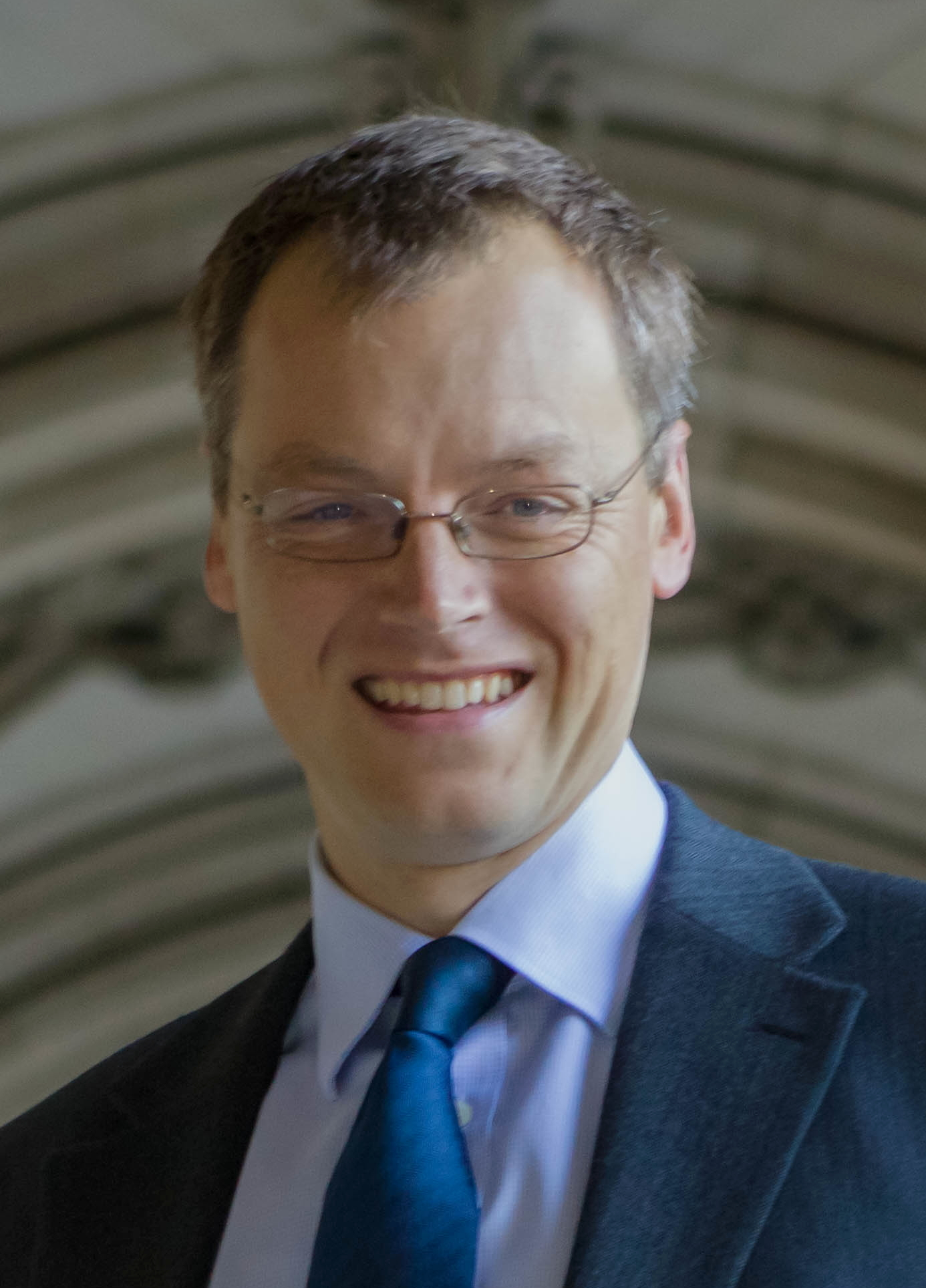

Minister of State for Countering Illegal Migration
- In office 7 December 2023 – 5 July 2024
- Prime Minister: Rishi Sunak
- Preceded by: The Lord Murray of Blidworth (Note: As Parliamentary Under-Secretary of State for Migration and Borders)
- Succeeded by: Angela Eagle (Note: As Minister of State for Border Security and Asylum)

Solicitor General for England and Wales
- In office 7 September 2022 – 7 December 2023
- Prime Minister: Liz Truss; Rishi Sunak
- Preceded by: Edward Timpson
- Succeeded by: Robert Courts

Vice-Chamberlain of the Household
- In office 8 July 2022 – 7 September 2022
- Prime Minister: Boris Johnson
- Preceded by: James Morris
- Succeeded by: Jo Churchill

Lord Commissioner of the Treasury
- In office 14 February 2020 – 8 July 2022
- Prime Minister: Boris Johnson
- Preceded by: Douglas Ross
- Succeeded by: James Duddridge

Member of Parliament for Mid Dorset and North Poole
- In office 7 May 2015 – 30 May 2024
- Preceded by: Annette Brooke
- Succeeded by: Vikki Slade

Personal details
- Born: Michael James Tomlinson; 1 October 1977 (age 49) Wokingham, Berkshire, England
- Party: Conservative
- Spouse: Frances Mynors
- Children: 3
- Education: King's College London
- Website: Official website

Michael James Tomlinson-Mynors KC (born 1 October 1977) is a British politician and barrister who served in the Cabinet as Minister of State for Countering Illegal Migration from December 2023 to July 2024. A member of the Conservative Party, he served as the Member of Parliament (MP) for Mid Dorset and North Poole from 2015 to 2024. He previously served as Solicitor General for England and Wales from September 2022 to December 2023 and Vice-Chamberlain of the Household from July to September 2022.

== Early life and career ==
Michael Tomlinson was born in Wokingham, Berkshire on 1 October 1977 and attended Hereford Cathedral School, a private school in Hereford. His father Howard was the headmaster of the school between 1987 and 2005.

He studied history at King's College London before obtaining a Postgraduate Diploma in Law at the College of Law. Tomlinson was called to the bar at Middle Temple in 2002. He worked as a door tenant at 3 Paper Buildings (3PB) specialising in commercial, contract, and personal injury law. While working for 3PB, Tomlinson undertook pro bono legal work and led mediation training sessions in Rwanda and Sierra Leone as part of the Conservative Party's Umubano project. He was appointed to the Attorney General's Civil Panel Counsel in 2007 and served till 2012.

== Parliamentary career ==
Tomlinson was selected as the Conservative candidate for Mid Dorset and North Poole in March 2013. He had previously been the campaign manager for the constituency in the 2010 general election. He was elected at the 2015 general election with 23,639 votes, a majority of 10,530 (22.6%). He made his maiden speech on 22 June 2015 during a debate on the Education and Adoption Bill.

Tomlinson supported Brexit in the 2016 Brexit referendum as he felt that it would restore the country's sovereignty. Tomlinson was a member of the European Scrutiny Committee between November 2016 and May 2017 and then again between October 2017 and November 2019. He was the deputy chair of the European Research Group between 2016 and 2018.

At the 2017 general election, Tomlinson was re-elected with a majority of 15,339 and 59.2% of the vote and 14,898 (30.5%).

Tomlinson was appointed Parliamentary Private Secretary (PPS) at the Department of International Development in July 2017 and was promoted to PPS to the Secretary of State, Penny Mordaunt, in January 2018. He was appointed PPS to Dominic Raab, Secretary of State for Exiting the European Union on 13 November 2018. Two days later Raab resigned. Tomlinson wrote an article in The Daily Telegraph on 16 November 2018, in which he expressed reservations about the then Prime Minister Theresa May's Brexit deal.

At the 2019 general election, Tomlinson was again re-elected, winning a majority of 14,898 with 60.4% of the vote.

In February 2020, Tomlinson was appointed a Lord Commissioner of the Treasury and then became Vice-Chamberlain of the Household in July 2022. In September 2022, he was appointed Solicitor General for England and Wales by Liz Truss and in October 2022 he was reappointed by Rishi Sunak. On 4 November 2022, he was appointed King's Counsel.

On 7 December 2023, Tomlinson was appointed as the Minister of State for Illegal Migration.

He was sworn of the Privy Council on 21 February 2024, entitling him to the style The Right Honourable for life.

He was defeated by Vikki Slade at her fourth attempt in 2024. Since then he has returned to working as a barrister at 3PB.

Michael was nominated by the Leader of the Opposition to join the Ethics and Integrity Commission. This nomination was confirmed by the Prime Minister and Michael joined the Commission in December 2025.

== Post-parliamentary career ==
Following his defeat at the 2024 UK General Election, Tomlinson began working as a freelance mediator and barrister.

== Personal life ==
Tomlinson is married to Frances Mynors and they have three children. She is the daughter of Sir Richard Mynors, 2nd Baronet of Treago Castle in Herefordshire. Frances worked as his principal secretary in his parliamentary office.

In 1997, he was selected to play for Herefordshire County Cricket Club in a Minor Counties Cricket Championship match against Dorset County Cricket Club.

Tomlinson has two sisters and had one younger brother, Edward, who died in 2006 at the age of 24 of carbon monoxide poisoning while on a gap year in Beirut, Lebanon.

== Notes ==
Legal offices
Preceded by Edward Timpson	Solicitor General for England and Wales; 2022–2023	Succeeded by Robert Courts
Government offices
Preceded by Simon Baynes as Parliamentary Under-Secretary of State for Justice and Tackling Illegal Migration	Minister of State for Illegal Migration; 2023–2024	Succeeded by Angela Eagle
Parliament of the United Kingdom
Preceded by Annette Brooke	Member of Parliament for Mid Dorset and North Poole; 2015–2024	Succeeded by Vikki Slade
