= Bouverie McDonald =

Bouverie Francis Primrose McDonald LRCS, LRCP (13 April 1861 — 8 July 1931) was a British medical doctor and Conservative Party politician. He was the Member of Parliament (MP) for Wallasey in Cheshire from 1918 until 1922.

== Biography ==
Bouverie McDonald was born in Edinburgh and was educated at Edinburgh Academy and the University of Edinburgh, taking the degree of Bachelor of Medicine in 1884 and Doctor of Medicine in 1886.

He moved first to Penrith in Cumberland and then in 1886 then to Wallasey in Cheshire, living first at Trafford House, Liscard and then at Ivor Lodge, Seabank Road, New Brighton.

He served as a member of Cheshire County Council for Liscard from 1903 to 1906, and served as a Justice of the Peace for Cheshire and Wallasey.

He was surgeon to the Wallasey Dispensary (which later became Victoria Central Hospital), and then surgeon to Seacombe Cottage Hospital, which in 1901 became Liscard Central Hospital. He resigned this post on his election to Parliament, resuming the position when he stood down from Parliament.

He served as president of the Wallasey Medical Society, the local Primrose League branch, and the Wallasey Constitutional Association.

At the 1918 election, he was selected as the Coalition Conservative candidate for the seat of Wallasey which had been newly created from the Wirral constituency. He did not contest the seat in 1922, when it was held for the Conservatives by Robert Chadwick.

After his retirement from Parliament, McDonald returned to medical practice, eventually retiring to Croydon where he died on 8 July 1931, aged 70.

Parliament of the United Kingdom
New constituency	Member of Parliament for Wallasey; 1918 – 1922	Succeeded by Robert Chadwick
