= Lynda Chalker =

British politician (born 1942)

The Right Honourable The Baroness Chalker of Wallasey PC FRGS
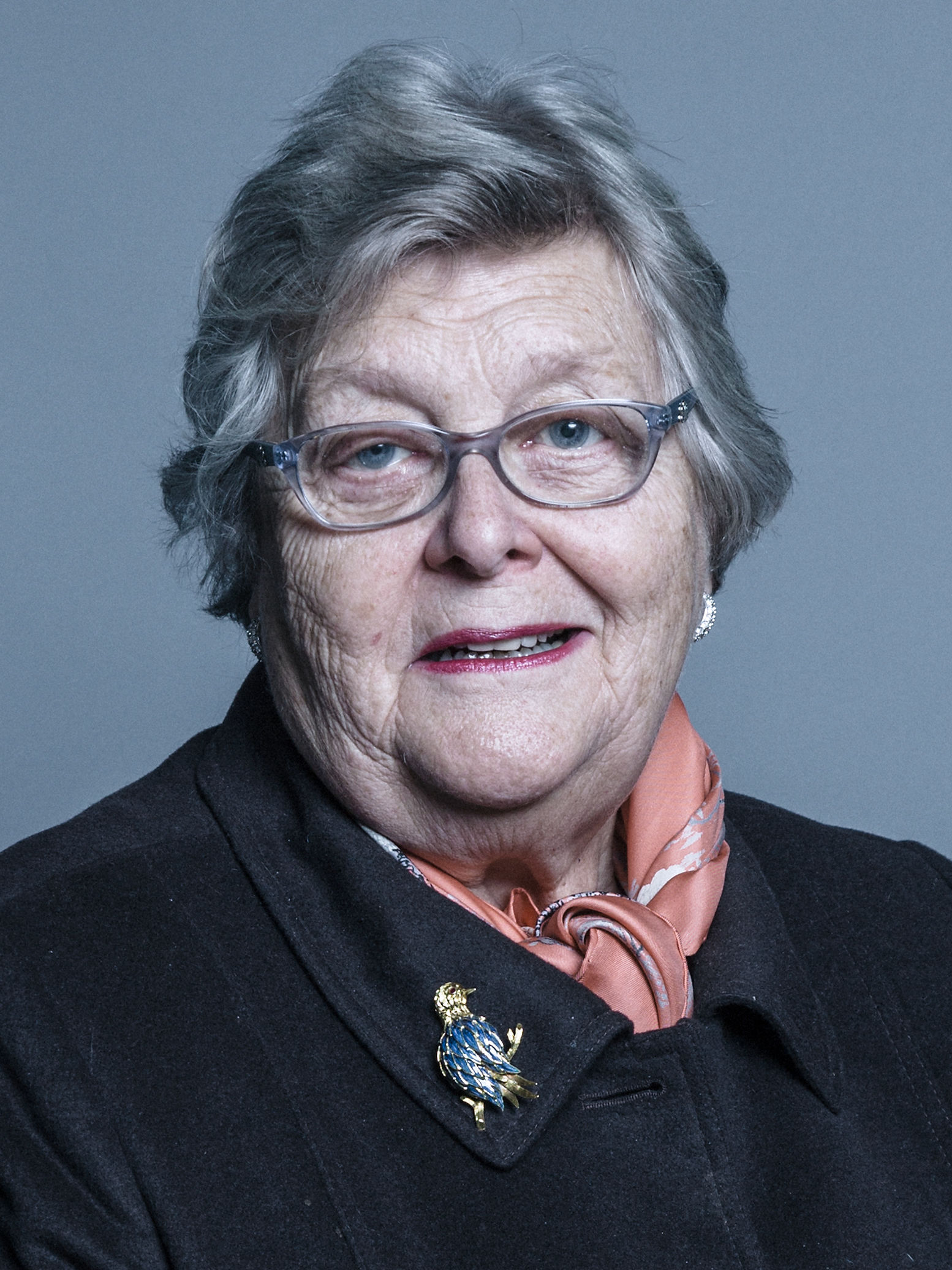
- Official portrait, 2018

Minister of State for Overseas Development & Africa
- In office 24 July 1989 – 1 May 1997
- Prime Minister: Margaret Thatcher; John Major
- Preceded by: Chris Patten
- Succeeded by: Clare Short (Note: As Secretary of State for International Development)

Minister of State for Europe
- In office 11 January 1986 – 24 July 1989
- Prime Minister: Margaret Thatcher
- Preceded by: Malcolm Rifkind
- Succeeded by: Francis Maude

Minister of State for Transport
- In office 18 October 1983 – 11 January 1986
- Prime Minister: Margaret Thatcher
- Preceded by: Position established
- Succeeded by: David Mitchell

Parliamentary Under-Secretary of State for Transport
- In office 5 March 1982 – 18 October 1983
- Prime Minister: Margaret Thatcher
- Preceded by: Kenneth Clarke
- Succeeded by: David Mitchell

Parliamentary Under-Secretary of State for Health and Social Security
- In office 7 May 1979 – 5 March 1982
- Prime Minister: Margaret Thatcher
- Preceded by: Eric Deakins
- Succeeded by: Tony Newton

Member of the House of Lords
- Lord Temporal
- Life peerage 24 April 1992 – 3 February 2023

Member of Parliament for Wallasey
- In office 28 February 1974 – 16 March 1992
- Preceded by: Ernest Marples
- Succeeded by: Angela Eagle

President of the Royal Geographical Society
- In office 2018–2021
- Preceded by: Nicholas Crane
- Succeeded by: Nigel Clifford

Personal details
- Born: Lynda Bates; 29 April 1942 (age 84)
- Party: Conservative
- Occupation: Politician
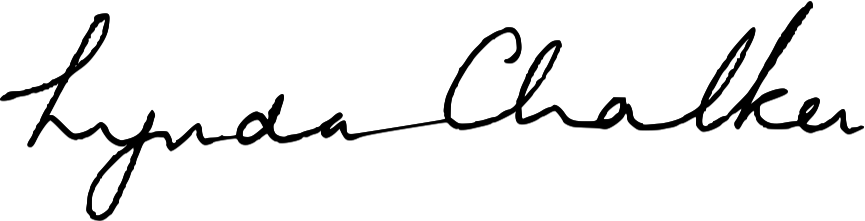
- Signature

Lynda Chalker, Baroness Chalker of Wallasey, PC, FRGS (née Bates; born 29 April 1942) is a retired British Conservative politician who was the Member of Parliament for Wallasey from 1974 to 1992. She served as Minister of State for Overseas Development and Africa at the Foreign Office in the Conservative government from 1989 to 1997.

Chalker headed the British delegation which participated in the first Tokyo International Conference on African Development in October 1993.

Although she never held a cabinet role, Chalker jointly holds the 20th-century record for continuous government service, along with Kenneth Clarke, Malcolm Rifkind, Tony Newton and Patrick Mayhew, for she held government office for the entire duration of the Conservatives' 18 years in power.

Chalker is the former president of the Royal Geographical Society.

== Early life and career ==
Chalker was educated at Roedean (where she was head girl), Heidelberg University, Queen Mary University of London and the University of Westminster (then known as the Polytechnic of Central London), and worked as a statistician and market researcher, including spells with Shell-Mex and BP and Opinion Research Centre (ORC), before entering Parliament in 1974 as MP for Wallasey, Merseyside, succeeding the former Cabinet minister Ernest Marples.

Chalker held a number of government posts, including spells as Parliamentary Under-Secretary of State at the Department of Health and Social Security from 1979 to 1982 and at the Department of Transport from 1982 to 1983. In 1983 she became Minister of State at Transport, and was appointed Minister for Europe in 1986. However, she was never made a Cabinet minister. Gillian Shephard argued that Prime Minister Margaret Thatcher should have promoted Chalker to Cabinet, saying, "Lynda had a very senior position as a sort of Deputy Foreign Secretary, and she had worked a lot on her own developing policy on Africa and elsewhere. She was a serious player, loyal to a fault and never put her foot in it – a first class woman." When asked, Chalker said that she believed she was overlooked because Thatcher wanted to be the only woman in Cabinet.

== Post-Commons ==
Chalker was granted a life peerage as Baroness Chalker of Wallasey, of Leigh-on-Sea in the County of Essex in 1992, after losing her seat at the general election of that year.

Chalker is the founder and president of Africa Matters Limited, an independent consultancy providing advice and assistance to companies initiating, developing or growing their activities in Africa. She is a member of the international advisory board of Lafarge and sits on the board of trustees of the Investment Climate Facility for Africa.

She is a consultant for Uganda's Presidential Investors Roundtable (PIRT) that advises the president Yoweri Museveni of Uganda, on ways to improve Uganda's investment climate and competitiveness.

She is a patron of The Gorilla Organization, a UK-based charity carrying on Dian Fossey's work to protect mountain gorillas in Uganda, Rwanda and DRC.

Chalker is a member of the board of trustees of Sentebale, a charity set up to reach Lesotho's poorest children, many of whom are victims of extreme poverty and the HIV/AIDS epidemic. She founded the Chalker Foundation, which seeks to support the improvement of healthcare in Africa.

She held the position of non-executive director and chairman of the Corporate Responsibility and Reputation Committee for Unilever, retiring in May 2007, having served three terms of three years. She joined the board of Unilever as an advisory director in 1998, becoming a non-executive director in 2004.

Chalker is a former chairman of the Medicines for Malaria Venture, a not-for-profit foundation dedicated to reducing the burden of malaria in disease endemic countries. She is a former non-executive director of Group Five (Pty). She was awarded the Livingstone Medal by the Royal Scottish Geographical Society in 2000.

In June 2014, Chalker was awarded honorary citizenship of Mozambique by President Armando Guebuza for services to that country.

Chalker was shortlisted for the Grassroot Diplomat Initiative Award in 2015 for her work with Africa Matters, and she remains in the directory of the Grassroot Diplomat Who's Who publication.

In 2018, it was announced that Chalker would take over from Nicholas Crane as president of the Royal Geographical Society.

== Notes ==
Parliament of the United Kingdom
Preceded by Ernest Marples	Member of Parliament for Wallasey; February 1974–1992	Succeeded by Angela Eagle
Political offices
Preceded by Malcolm Rifkind	Minister for Europe; 1986–1989	Succeeded by Francis Maude
Preceded by Chris Patten	Minister for Overseas Development; 1989–1997	Succeeded by Clare Short as Secretary of State for International Development
