= George Reakes =

British politician

George Leonard Reakes JP (31 July 1889 – 15 April 1961) was a British politician. Born in Bath, Somerset, he became Mayor of Wallasey and later Member of Parliament (MP).

Reakes entered local politics while working as a journalist for a group of Cheshire newspapers. He became Mayor of Wallasey in 1937–1938. He resigned from the Labour Party on the question of rearmament immediately prior to the Second World War.

In 1942, he left his job in postal censorship to contest the Wallasey by-election as an Independent and was elected, defeating the National Government candidate John Pennington by 6,012 votes. He said of his victory, "It is a victory for Churchill and our enemies will now know that Wallasey wants a vigorous prosecution of the war with a fight to the finish. The voters are dissatisfied with party politics." He tried to hold the seat at the 1945 general election but was defeated by the Conservative Ernest Marples.

Reakes was a magistrate for nearly twenty years and later became chairman of the Wallasey Juvenile Court. In 1956, he published his autobiography, Man of the Mersey.

Parliament of the United Kingdom
Preceded by John Moore-Brabazon	Member of Parliament for Wallasey; 1942–1945	Succeeded by Ernest Marples
