= Derek Moore-Brabazon, 2nd Baron Brabazon of Tara =

The Right Honourable The Lord Brabazon of Tara CBE

Member of the House of Lords Lord Temporal
- In office 17 May 1964 – 11 December 1974; Hereditary peerage
- Preceded by: The 1st Baron Brabazon of Tara
- Succeeded by: The 3rd Baron Brabazon of Tara

Personal details
- Born: 24 December 1910
- Died: 11 December 1974 (aged 63)
- Party: Conservative
- Spouse: Henrietta Mary Clegg (m. 1939)

Derek Charles Moore-Brabazon, 2nd Baron Brabazon of Tara CBE (24 December 1910 – 11 December 1974), succeeded the title Baron Brabazon of Tara in 1964 on the death of his father, John Cuthbert Moore-Brabazon, 1st Baron Brabazon of Tara, carrying it for just ten years until his death in 1974.

== Life ==
He was educated at Harrow School and Trinity College, Cambridge. An active Conservative, he was a councillor in Kensington, 1948–56, Chairman of the South Kensington Conservative Association 1952–54 and chairman of London Conservative Union, 1957–58. After the end of his tenure, he was appointed to the Order of the British Empire as a Commander (CBE) in the 1960 New Year Honours for "political and public services in London".

== Family ==
In 1939, Moore-Brabazon married Henrietta Mary Clegg who died in 1985. Their son, Ivon, succeeded his father in 1974.

Peerage of the United Kingdom
Preceded by John Moore-Brabazon	Baron Brabazon of Tara; 1964–1974	Succeeded by Ivon Moore-Brabazon
