= Angela Eagle =

British politician (born 1961)

The Right Honourable Dame Angela Eagle DBE MP
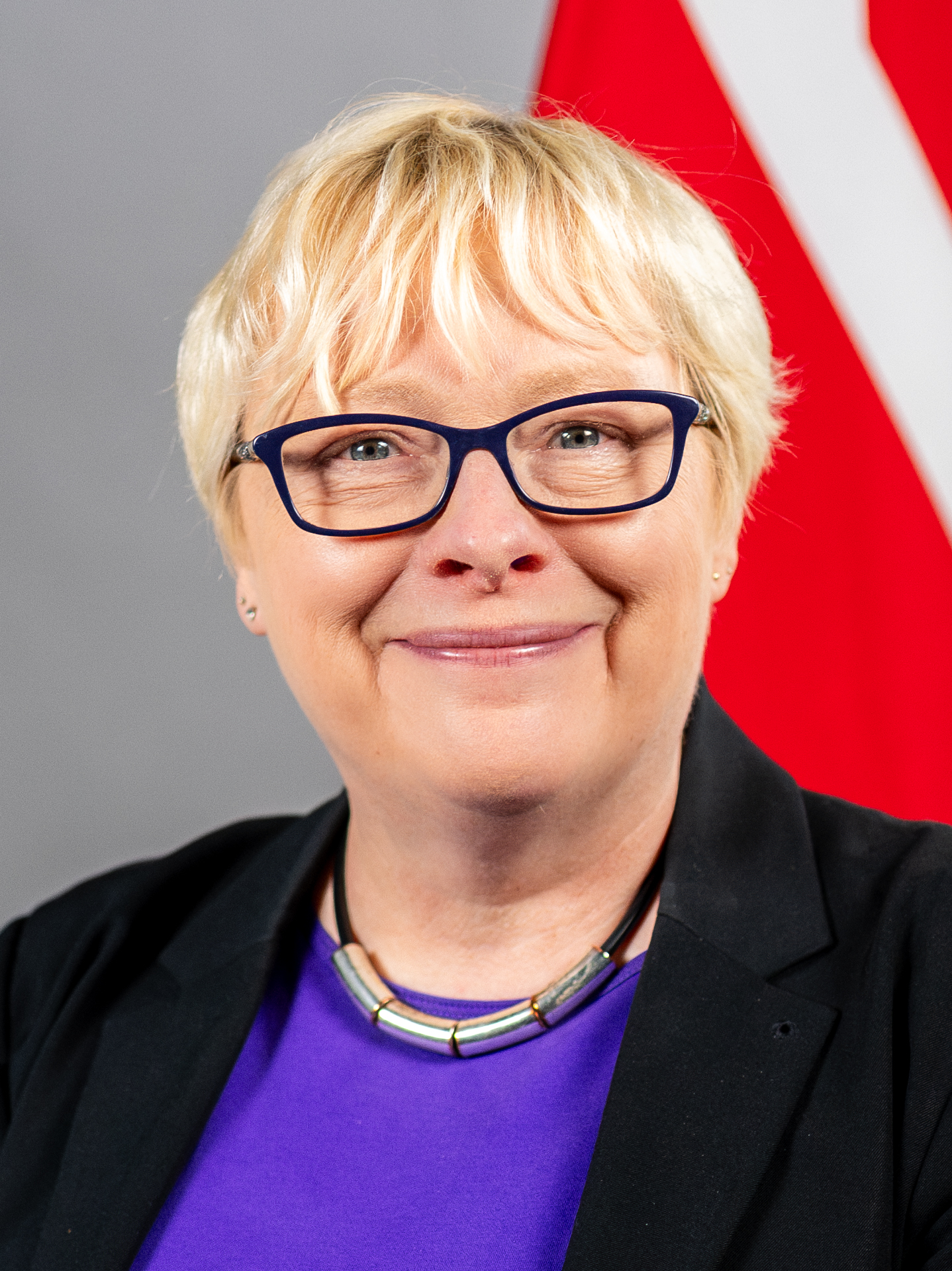
- Official portrait, 2024

Secretary of State for Environment, Food and Rural Affairs
- Incumbent
- Assumed office 20 July 2026
- Prime Minister: Andy Burnham
- Preceded by: Emma Reynolds
Junior ministerial offices
Minister of State for Security
In office 12 June 2026 – 20 July 2026
Prime Minister	Keir Starmer
Preceded by	Dan Jarvis
Succeeded by	Dan Jarvis
Minister of State for Food Security and Rural Affairs
In office 6 September 2025 – 12 June 2026
Prime Minister	Keir Starmer
Preceded by	Daniel Zeichner
Succeeded by	Stephen Morgan
Minister of State for Border Security and Asylum
In office 8 July 2024 – 6 September 2025
Prime Minister	Keir Starmer
Preceded by	Michael Tomlinson (Countering Illegal Migration)
Succeeded by	Alex Norris
Minister of State for Pensions and Ageing Society
In office 8 June 2009 – 11 May 2010
Prime Minister	Gordon Brown
Preceded by	Rosie Winterton
Succeeded by	Steve Webb
Exchequer Secretary to the Treasury
In office 29 June 2007 – 8 June 2009
Prime Minister	Gordon Brown
Preceded by	Phillip Oppenheim
Succeeded by	Kitty Ussher
Parliamentary Under-Secretary of State for Home Affairs
In office 11 June 2001 – 28 May 2002
Prime Minister	Tony Blair
Preceded by	Mike O'Brien
Succeeded by	The Lord Filkin
Parliamentary Under-Secretary of State for Social Security
In office 28 July 1998 – 7 June 2001
Prime Minister	Tony Blair
Preceded by	Keith Bradley
Succeeded by	Malcolm Wicks
Parliamentary Under Secretary of State for the Environment, Transport and the Regions
In office 6 May 1997 – 28 July 1998
Prime Minister	Tony Blair
Preceded by	Office established
Succeeded by	Alan Meale
Shadow portfolios
Shadow cabinet portfolios
2015–2016	First Secretary of State
2015–2016	Business, Innovation and Skills
2011–2015	Leader of the House of Commons
2010–2011	Chief Secretary to the Treasury
Junior shadow portfolios
1996–1997	Whip

Member of Parliament for Wallasey
- Incumbent
- Assumed office 9 April 1992
- Preceded by: Lynda Chalker
- Majority: 17,996 (42.1%)

Personal details
- Born: 17 February 1961 (age 65) Bridlington, East Riding of Yorkshire, England
- Party: Labour
- Domestic partner: Maria Exall
- Relatives: Maria Eagle (sister)
- Education: St John's College, Oxford (BA)

Dame Angela Eagle DBE (born 17 February 1961) is a British politician who has served as Secretary of State for Environment, Food and Rural Affairs since 2026. A member of the Labour Party, she has been the Member of Parliament (MP) for Wallasey since 1992.

Born in Bridlington, Eagle was educated at Formby High School. She studied philosophy, politics and economics at St John's College, Oxford and then worked in the economic directorate of the Confederation of British Industry (CBI). Eagle was elected to Parliament at the 1992 general election for the seat of Wallasey. Following the 1997 general election, Eagle joined the government frontbench under Tony Blair as a Parliamentary under-secretary of state at the Department for the Environment, Transport and the Regions, moving to the Department of Social Security in 1998. Eagle was again re-elected at the 2001 general election, and then was appointed an Under-Secretary of State at the Home Office. She was dismissed from the government in 2002. Eagle returned to the frontbench under Gordon Brown as Exchequer Secretary to the Treasury in 2007. She then served as Minister of State for Pensions and Ageing Society from 2009 until Labour lost the 2010 general election.

Eagle was elected to the Shadow Cabinet in October 2010 and was appointed by Ed Miliband as Shadow Chief Secretary to the Treasury. In October 2011, she was promoted to Shadow Leader of the House of Commons. Following Labour's defeat at the 2015 general election, she stood in the 2015 deputy leadership election but finished fourth. Following Jeremy Corbyn's election as Labour leader in September 2015, Eagle was appointed Shadow First Secretary of State and Shadow Secretary of State for Business, Innovation and Skills. She resigned from the Shadow Cabinet in June 2016 in protest against Corbyn's leadership. Eagle announced a leadership challenge to Corbyn the following month, but eight days later she withdrew leaving Owen Smith to challenge Corbyn for the leadership. She then served on the backbenches for eight years between 2016 and 2024.

Following Labour's victory in the 2024 general election, Eagle returned to government as Minister of State for Border Security and Asylum under Keir Starmer. She was appointed Minister of State for Food Security and Rural Affairs in September 2025 and then Minister of State for Security in June 2026. After Andy Burnham became Prime Minister in July 2026, Eagle was promoted to Cabinet as Environment Secretary.

== Early life and career ==
Angela Eagle was born on 17 February 1961 in Bridlington, the daughter of Shirley (née Kirk), a factory worker, and André Eagle, a print worker. She was educated at St Peter's C of E Primary School and Formby High School. In 1976, Eagle was joint winner of the British Girls' Under-18 chess championship. She studied philosophy, politics and economics at St John's College, Oxford, graduating from the university with a second-class Bachelor of Arts degree in 1983. While at Oxford, she was chairwoman of the Oxford University Fabian Society.

In 1984, after graduating from Oxford, Eagle worked in the economic directorate of the Confederation of British Industry (CBI), before joining the Confederation of Health Service Employees (COHSE) trade union where she held a number of positions. She was elected secretary for the Constituency Labour Party in Peckham for two years from 1989.

== Parliamentary career ==
=== Early career (1992–1997) ===
Eagle was elected to Parliament as MP for Wallasey at the 1992 general election, winning with 48.9% of the vote and a majority of 3,809. Allegations were made about irregularities in her selection as parliamentary candidate, including the exclusion of a local favourite from the shortlist of candidates, and in the vote count itself.

Eagle became a member of the Employment Select committee in 1994. She was promoted by Tony Blair in 1996 to the position of an Opposition Whip.

=== Junior ministerial career (1997–2002) ===
Eagle was re-elected as MP for Wallasey at the 1997 general election with an increased vote share of 64.6% and an increased majority of 19,074. Following the 1997 general election, Eagle was as the Parliamentary under-secretary of state at the Department for the Environment, Transport and the Regions, moving to the Department of Social Security in 1998. She was again re-elected at the 2001 general election, with a decreased vote share of 60.8% and a decreased majority of 12,276. Following the general election, she succeeded Mike O'Brien as an Under-Secretary of State at the Home Office.

=== Return to the backbenches (2002–2007) ===
Eagle was dismissed from the government by Blair in 2002, reportedly in error, and replaced by Lord Filkin.

As a backbencher, Eagle joined the Treasury Select Committee in January 2003. She voted in favour of the U.S.-led invasion of Iraq in 2003, and repeatedly against investigating it in 2003, 2006, and 2007.

At the 2005 general election, Eagle was again re-elected with a decreased vote share of 54.8% and a decreased majority of 9,109.

=== Return to government (2007–2010) ===
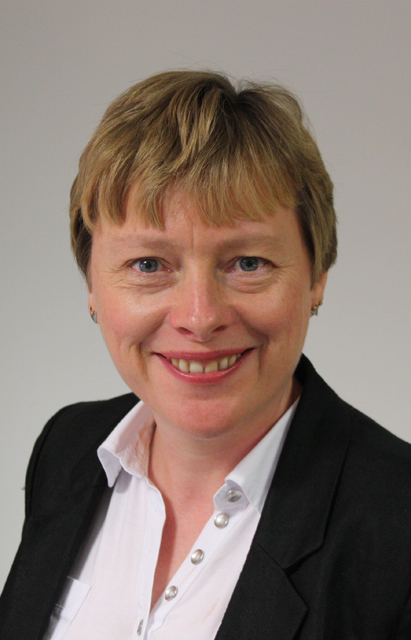
Official portrait, 2009

Eagle returned to the government under Gordon Brown on 29 June 2007 as Exchequer Secretary to the Treasury, the most junior minister at HM Treasury. She was promoted to Minister of State at the Department for Work and Pensions in the June 2009 reshuffle.

In April 2008 Eagle took part in a debate in Parliament on the UK economy in which the Liberal Democrats tabled a motion suggesting that the country was facing an "extreme bubble in the housing market" and the "risk of recession". Eagle responded, "Fortunately for all of us ... that colourful and lurid fiction has no real bearing on the macro-economic reality." A year later Jeremy Browne, who led the original debate, said her comments "summed up the Government's delusional attitude" towards warnings of financial crisis.

=== Miliband shadow cabinet (2010–2015) ===
Eagle was again re-elected at the 2010 general election with a decreased vote share of 51.8% and a decreased majority of 8,507. Following Ed Miliband's accession to Leader of the Labour Party after the 2010 general election, Eagle was elected to his shadow cabinet and was subsequently appointed to the Chief Secretary to the Treasury briefing, shadowing Danny Alexander.

In the October 2011 reshuffle, Eagle became Shadow Leader of the House of Commons.

In April 2011, Eagle was put down in the House of Commons by Prime Minister David Cameron when he used Michael Winner's catchphrase "Calm down, dear". Eagle's colleague, deputy Labour leader Harriet Harman, said: "Women in Britain in the 21st century do not expect to be told to 'calm down, dear' by their Prime Minister", with Labour officials calling for an apology, suggesting the remark was patronising and sexist.

In May 2012, Eagle became chair of the Labour Party's National Policy Forum and served as chair of the party's National Executive Committee 2013–14.

In June 2012, Eagle criticised Take That singer Gary Barlow in the House of Commons following newspaper allegations of tax avoidance made against him. Eagle criticised his recent appointment as an OBE, and claimed in the House of Commons that Barlow had "given a whole new meaning to the phrase 'Take That'," as well as questioning why Prime Minister David Cameron had not criticised Barlow publicly in the same way he had criticised comedian Jimmy Carr for tax avoidance.

=== Deputy leadership election (2015) ===
At the 2015 general election, Eagle was again re-elected, with an increased vote share of 60.4% and an increased majority of 16,348.

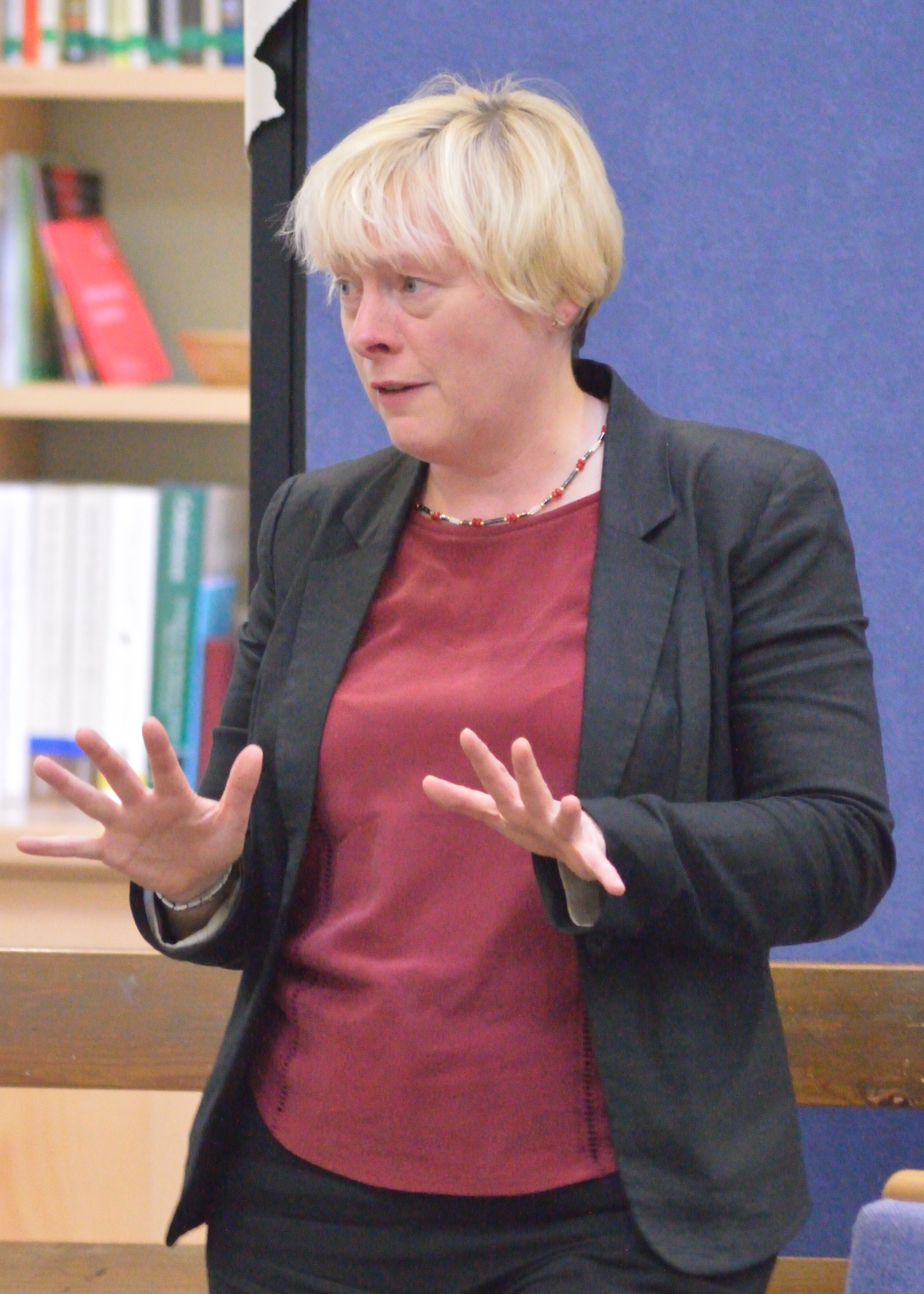
Speaking at a 2015 deputy leadership election meeting in Bath

Following the resignation of Miliband and deputy Harriet Harman following Labour's defeat at the 2015 general election, Eagle stood in the Labour Party deputy leadership election.

Eagle was nominated by 32 Constituency Labour Parties and trade unions UNISON, CWU, TSSA, and UCATT and received joint support from Unite for her and fellow candidate Tom Watson. Eagle came fourth to eventual winner Tom Watson, with 16.2% in the first round, and was eliminated in the second round on 17.9% of the vote.

=== Corbyn shadow cabinet (2015–2016) ===
Following the leadership election, Labour Party leader Jeremy Corbyn appointed Eagle as Shadow First Secretary of State and Shadow Business Secretary in September 2015.

Angela Eagle resigned from these positions on 27 June 2016 in the mass resignation of the Shadow Cabinet in the wake of the vote for Leave in the 2016 United Kingdom European Union membership referendum. Eagle had campaigned for the Remain side in the referendum.

==== Leadership challenge ====
Following the 28 June 2016 vote of no confidence by Labour MPs in Jeremy Corbyn's leadership, Eagle was reported as considering a challenge for the leadership of the Labour Party, and said she would do so if Corbyn did not resign. Eagle asserted that: "I'm not a Blairite. I'm not a Brownite... I am my own woman, a strong Labour woman." George Eaton of the New Statesman reported that backers of the other potential challenger, Owen Smith, contended that Eagle's 2003 vote in support for the Iraq War and her support for extending airstrikes against ISIS into Syria (in December 2015) might harm her bid against Corbyn, Gary Younge of The Guardian thought it was less clear what Eagle wanted in place of Corbyn's politics.

Eagle announced a leadership challenge to Corbyn on 11 July, saying that "Jeremy Corbyn is unable to provide the leadership this huge task needs. I believe I can". On Tuesday 19 July 2016, Eagle announced she was withdrawing from the leadership election and would back the other candidate opposing Corbyn, Owen Smith, who had received about 20 more nominations from MPs and MEPs than she had. "We need to have a strong and united party so we can be a good opposition, take the fight to the Conservative Government and heal our country. So I am announcing that I will be supporting Owen in that endeavour with all my enthusiasm and might," Eagle said in an interview.

Eagle's Constituency Labour Party in Wallasey were in favour of Corbyn remaining party leader and called upon Eagle to support Corbyn as leader. Her local party in Wallasey declared their support for Jeremy Corbyn as party leader "with an overwhelming majority" and proposed a vote of no-confidence in Eagle. This did not take place as the NEC decided to suspend all Labour constituency party meetings during the leadership election. With the support of Eagle, Wallasey Constituency Labour Party was suspended on 20 July 2016 over claims of bullying. An internal Labour Party investigation concerning complaints about incidents in Eagle's Constituency Labour Party and other events during her leadership campaign reported in October 2016. It confirmed that she had received homophobic abuse during a CLP annual general meeting earlier in the year. Pro-Corbyn activists strongly deny these accusations.

The day following her declaration a brick was thrown through a downstairs window at her constituency office address, and it was reported that her staff had stopped answering the telephones because of "abusive" calls. Eagle herself claimed to have received hundreds of abusive and homophobic messages at this time. It emerged on 21 July that the police had advised Eagle not to hold any open constituency surgeries over fears for her safety, advice which she has agreed to follow with regret. "It's highly likely that the brick thrown through the window of Angela Eagle's office was related to her leadership challenge". According to an internal party report, "[t]he position of the window made it very unlikely that this was" an action of "a random passerby" and it "was directly between two Labour offices". The claim "that the building was occupied by many companies and the window was in an unrelated stairwell" was judged to be misleading as "the landlord had a number of companies registered there; in fact the only other occupant is the landlord on the upper floor".

=== Opposition backbenches (2016–2024) ===
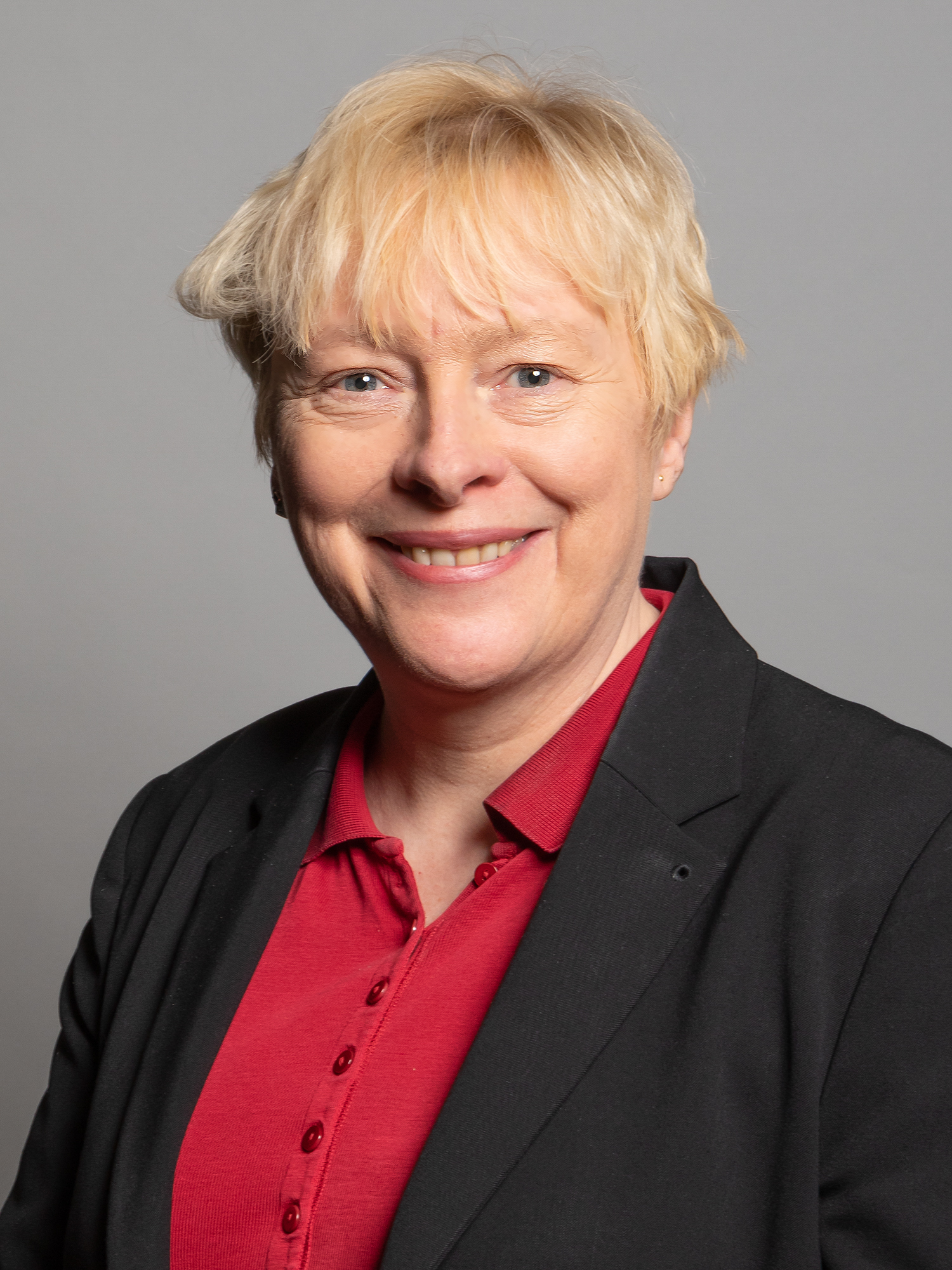
Official portrait, 2020

She was again re-elected at the snap 2017 general election with an increased vote share of 71.5% and an increased majority of 23,320. At the 2019 general election, Eagle was again re-elected, with a decreased vote share of 64.3% and a decreased majority of 18,322.

=== Return to government (2024–present) ===
Eagle was again re-elected at the 2024 general election with a decreased vote share of 57.7% and a decreased majority of 17,996. After the election, she returned to government as Minister of State for Border Security and Asylum under Prime Minister Keir Starmer.

In November 2024, Eagle voted in favour of the Terminally Ill Adults (End of Life) Bill, which proposes to legalise assisted suicide.

In the 2025 cabinet reshuffle, Eagle was moved out of the Home Office along with Diana Johnson, and subsequently appointed Minister of State for Food Security and Rural Affairs.

Following the appointment of Dan Jarvis as Defence Secretary, Eagle was appointed Minister of State for Security and Minister of State in the Cabinet Office on 12 June 2026.

On 20 July 2026, Eagle was promoted to cabinet and appointed Secretary of State for Environment, Food and Rural Affairs under Andy Burnham.

== Personal life ==
Eagle was joined in the House of Commons at the 1997 general election by her twin sister, Maria Eagle. (Note: They are sometimes incorrectly described as the first pair of twins to sit in the Commons together, but in fact the first set of twins is believed to have been James and Richard Grenville, who sat together for Buckingham between 1774 and 1780.) The Eagles are one of two pairs of sisters in the Commons, as of 2017, the other being Rachel and Ellie Reeves. They are identical twins.

Angela Eagle is a lesbian, coming out in a newspaper interview in September 1997. She is the second openly lesbian MP, after Maureen Colquhoun in the 1970s. In September 2008, Eagle entered into a civil partnership with Maria Exall who is also involved in the Labour Party through the National Committee.

Eagle is a fan of new wave band The Pretenders, and got to know lead singer Chrissie Hynde by sneaking backstage at Pretenders gigs. She still attends their gigs regularly, and Hynde has noted that Eagle would probably know even the band's most obscure songs.

== Honours ==
Eagle was appointed Dame Commander of the Order of the British Empire (DBE) in the 2021 New Year Honours for parliamentary and political service. She is an honorary associate of the National Secular Society.

On 21 July 2026, Eagle was affirmed into the Privy Council, entitling her to the honorific style "The Right Honourable" for life.

== Notes ==
Parliament of the United Kingdom
Preceded by Lynda Chalker	Member of Parliament for Wallasey; 1992–present	Incumbent
Political offices
Vacant Title last held by Phillip Oppenheim	Exchequer Secretary to the Treasury; 2007–2009	Succeeded by Kitty Ussher
Preceded by Rosie Winterton	Minister of State for Pensions and Ageing Society; 2009–2010	Succeeded by Steve Webb
Preceded by Liam Byrne	Shadow Chief Secretary to the Treasury; 2010–2011	Succeeded by Rachel Reeves
Preceded by Hilary Benn as Acting Shadow First Secretary of State	Shadow Leader of the House of Commons; 2011–2015	Succeeded by Chris Bryant
Preceded by Hilary Benn as Acting Shadow First Secretary of State	Shadow First Secretary of State; 2015–2016	Vacant Title next held by Emily Thornberry
Preceded by Chuka Umunna	Shadow Secretary of State for Business, Innovation and Skills; 2015–2016	Succeeded by Jon Trickett
Party political offices
Preceded by Harriet Yeo	Chair of the Labour Party; 2013–2014	Succeeded by Jim Kennedy
