= Robert Burton-Chadwick =

British politician

Sir Robert Burton-Chadwick, 1st Baronet
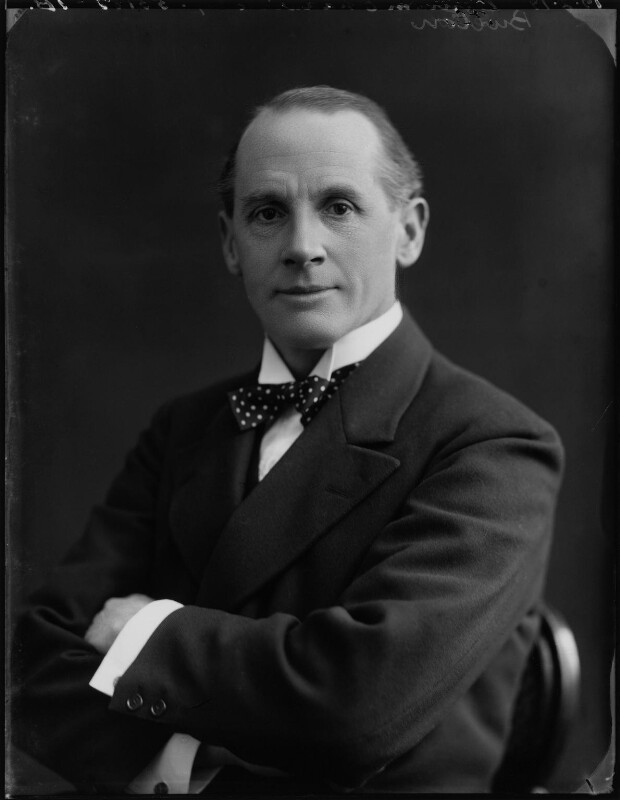

Member of Parliament for Wallasey
- In office 15 November 1922 – 7 October 1931
- Preceded by: Bouverie McDonald
- Succeeded by: John Moore-Brabazon

Member of Parliament for Barrow-in-Furness
- In office 14 December 1918 – 26 October 1922
- Preceded by: Charles Duncan
- Succeeded by: Daniel Somerville

Personal details
- Born: 20 June 1869
- Died: 21 May 1951 (aged 81)
- Party: Conservative

Sir Robert Burton-Chadwick, 1st Baronet (20 June 1869 – 21 May 1951) was a shipping magnate and an English Conservative Party politician.

Chadwick was born at Oxton, Cheshire, the son of Joseph Chadwick, being baptised with the name of Robert Chadwick. He was head of the shipping firm of Chadwick and Askew, of London and Liverpool and was eventually Director of Chadwick, Weir and Company, of London.

Chadwick served with the Duke of Lancaster's Own Yeomanry in the Second Boer War from 1900 to 1901. During World War I, he became an Honorary Captain in the Hospital service of Royal Naval Reserve. He was decorated with the Royal Humane Society certificate for saving life.

Chadwick was elected as M.P. for Barrow in Furness in 1918 and in 1922 took the seat of Wallasey which he held until 1931. He held membership of a number of political organisations associated with the right of the Conservative Party, notably the British Fascists and the Middle Class Union. He was Parliamentary Secretary to the Board of Trade between 1924 and 1928.

Having been knighted in 1920, he was created a baronet, of Bidston in the County Palatine of Chester on 3 July 1935. He changed his name by deed poll to Robert Burton-Chadwick in 1936.

From 1940 to 1947 he was Counsellor to the British Embassy at Buenos Aires, Argentina.

Chadwick married Catherine Barbara Williams, daughter of Thomas Williams, in 1903. Their eldest son Noel was killed in action serving with the Royal Air Force in 1941. His second son Robert became 2nd Baronet on the death of his father in Westminster registration district aged 81 in 1951.

Parliament of the United Kingdom
Preceded by Charles Duncan	Member of Parliament for Barrow-in-Furness; 1918–1922	Succeeded by Daniel Somerville
Preceded by Bouverie McDonald	Member of Parliament for Wallasey; 1922–1931	Succeeded by John Moore-Brabazon
Baronetage of the United Kingdom
New creation	Baronet (of Bidston); 1935–1951	Succeeded by Robert Burton-Chadwick
