= Burton-Chadwick baronets =

Baronetcy in the Baronetage of the United Kingdom

The Chadwick, later Burton-Chadwick Baronetcy, of Bidston in the County Palatine of Chester, is a title in the Baronetage of the United Kingdom. It was created on 3 July 1935 for the businessman and Conservative politician Sir Robert Chadwick. He served as Parliamentary Secretary to the Board of Trade from 1924 to 1928. In 1936 he assumed by deed poll the additional surname of Burton. As of 2007 the title is held by his grandson, the third Baronet, who succeeded his father in 1983.

== Chadwick, later Burton-Chadwick baronets, of Bidston (1935) ==
- Sir Robert Burton-Chadwick, 1st Baronet (1869–1951)
- Sir Robert Burton-Chadwick, 2nd Baronet (1911–1983)
- Sir Joshua Kenneth Burton-Chadwick, 3rd Baronet (born 1954)

There is no heir to the baronetcy.
