= Minister of State for Border Security and Asylum =

Senior ministerial position in the Government of the United Kingdom

United Kingdom Minister of State for Border Security and Asylum
- Royal Arms of His Majesty's Government

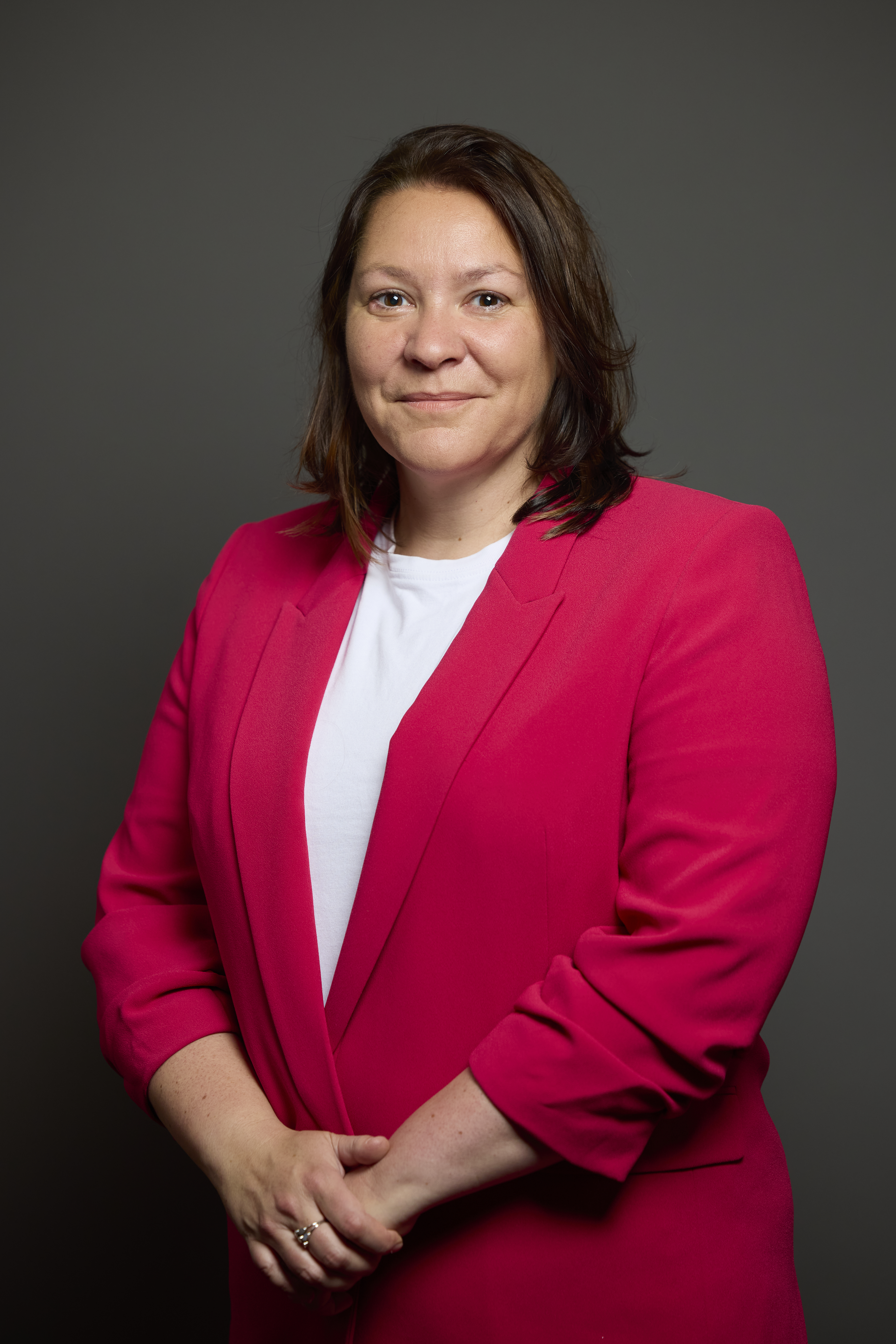
- Incumbent; Anna Turley since 21 July 2026
- Home Office
- Style: Illegal Migration Minister (informal); The Right Honourable (within the UK and Commonwealth)
- Type: Minister of the Crown
- Status: Minister of State
- Reports to: Prime Minister of the United Kingdom; Home Secretary
- Seat: Westminster
- Nominator: Prime Minister
- Appointer: The Monarch; (on the advice of the Prime Minister)
- Term length: At His Majesty's pleasure
- Formation: 10 September 2019
- Salary: £115,824 per annum (2022) (including £86,584 MP salary)

The minister of state for Border Security and Asylum is a senior role in the British Home Office with responsibility for tackling irregular migration.

It was previously known as the Parliamentary Under-Secretary of State for Justice and Tackling Illegal Migration, previously known as Parliamentary Under-Secretary of State for Immigration Compliance and Courts and held in both the British Home Office and the Ministry of Justice. It was last held as a Parliamentary Under-Secretary of State by Simon Baynes MP who took the office on 8 July 2022 after a cabinet reshuffle.

== Responsibilities ==
The minister previously had the following responsibilities:

- Border Security Command: reducing small boat arrivals and organised immigration crime
- reducing the asylum caseload, exiting hotels and reducing the supported population
- Immigration Enforcement: Increasing returns (including FNOs), immigration detention estate expansion, illegal working
- asylum, illegal migration and returns policy, safe and legal policy and refugee resettlement policy
- reducing net migration: legal migration policy
- tackling visa abuse
- innovative solutions
- Immigration White Paper implementation
- European Entry and Exit System
- modern slavery policy as it relates to immigration status

== List of officeholders ==
| Name | Portrait | Term of office | | Political party | Prime Minister | Home Secretary |
Parliamentary Under-Secretary of State for Immigration Compliance and Courts
| Chris Philp | | 10 September 2019 | 16 September 2021 | Conservative | Johnson | Patel |
Parliamentary Under-Secretary of State for Justice and Tackling Illegal Migration
| Tom Pursglove | | 17 September 2021 | 7 July 2022 | Conservative | Johnson | Patel |
| Simon Baynes | | 8 July 2022 | 8 September 2022 | Conservative | Johnson | Patel |
Minister of State for Migration and Borders until 29 October 2022 Parliamentary Under-Secretary of State from 30 October 2022
| Simon Murray, Baron Murray of Blidworth | | 7 October 2022 | 14 November 2023 | Conservative | Truss; Sunak | Braverman; Shapps |
Minister of State for Countering Illegal Migration
| Michael Tomlinson | | 7 December 2023 | 5 July 2024 | Conservative | Sunak | Cleverly |
Minister of State for Border Security and Asylum
| Angela Eagle | | 8 July 2024 | 6 September 2025 | Labour | Starmer | Cooper |
| Alex Norris | | 6 September 2025 | 20 July 2026 | Labour Co-op | Starmer | Mahmood |
| Anna Turley | | 21 July 2026 | Incumbent | Labour Co-op | Burnham | Mahmood |
