= Baron Brabazon of Tara =

Barony in the Peerage of the United Kingdom

Baron Brabazon of Tara, of Sandwich in the County of Kent, is a title in the Peerage of the United Kingdom. It was created on 27 April 1942 for the aviation pioneer and Conservative politician John Moore-Brabazon. Moore-Brabazon was a descendant through a female line of the 7th Earl of Meath. His father, Major John Arthur Henry Moore, had assumed the additional surname of Brabazon in 1866 by Royal Licence. As of 2017 the title is held by the first Baron's grandson, the third Baron, who succeeded his father in 1974. He is also a Conservative politician and was one of the ninety elected hereditary peers that remain in the House of Lords after the passing of the House of Lords Act 1999, retiring in 2022.

== Barons Brabazon of Tara (1942) ==
- John Cuthbert Moore-Brabazon, 1st Baron Brabazon of Tara (1884–1964)
- Derek Charles Moore-Brabazon, 2nd Baron Brabazon of Tara (1910–1974)
- Ivon Anthony Moore-Brabazon, 3rd Baron Brabazon of Tara (b. 1946)

The heir apparent is the present holder's son Benjamin Ralph Moore-Brabazon (b. 1983)

== See also ==
- Earl of Meath
- Brabazon baronets
