= Redwing (keelboat) =

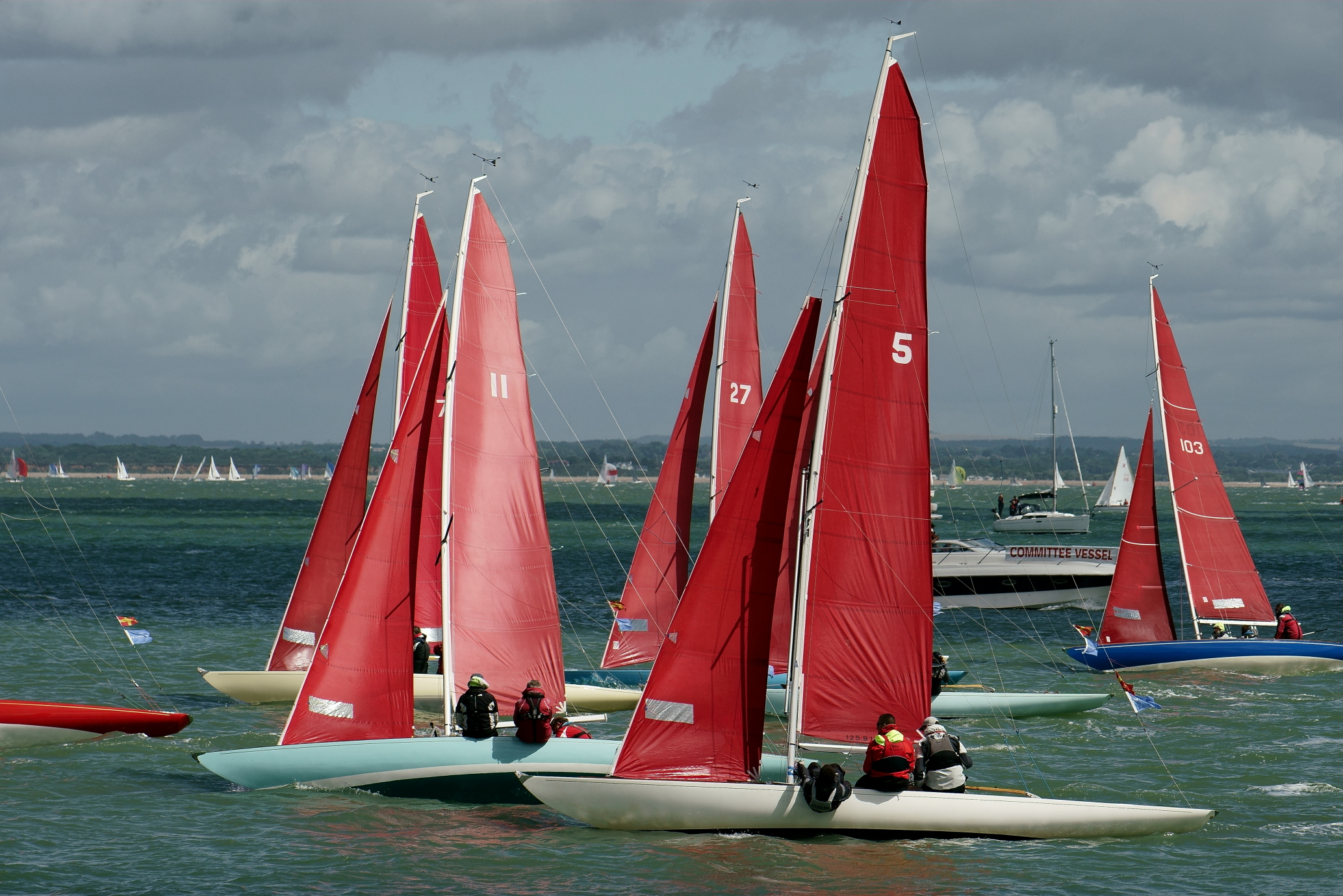
- 18

Development
- Designer: Charles Ernest Nicholson
- Year: 1896 & 1938
- Name: Redwing

Boat
- Crew: 2

Hull
- Type: Monohull
- LOA: 8.51 m (27.9 ft)
- Beam: 1.68 m (5 ft 6 in)

Hull appendages
- Keel: Fixed

Sails
- Upwind sail area: 200 ft^{2} (19 m^{2})

The Redwing know more commonly as the Bembridge Redwing is a keelboat originally designed by Charles Ernest Nicholson in 1896 and first raced in 1897. In 1937 the class was redesigned by Nicholson to create the 1938 Redwing that can be seen racing both outside Bembridge Harbour and in Poole Harbour on the south of England. The class is a one design hull with a development rig where the rules specify a maximum sail area of 200 sq. ft. with only a few constraints.

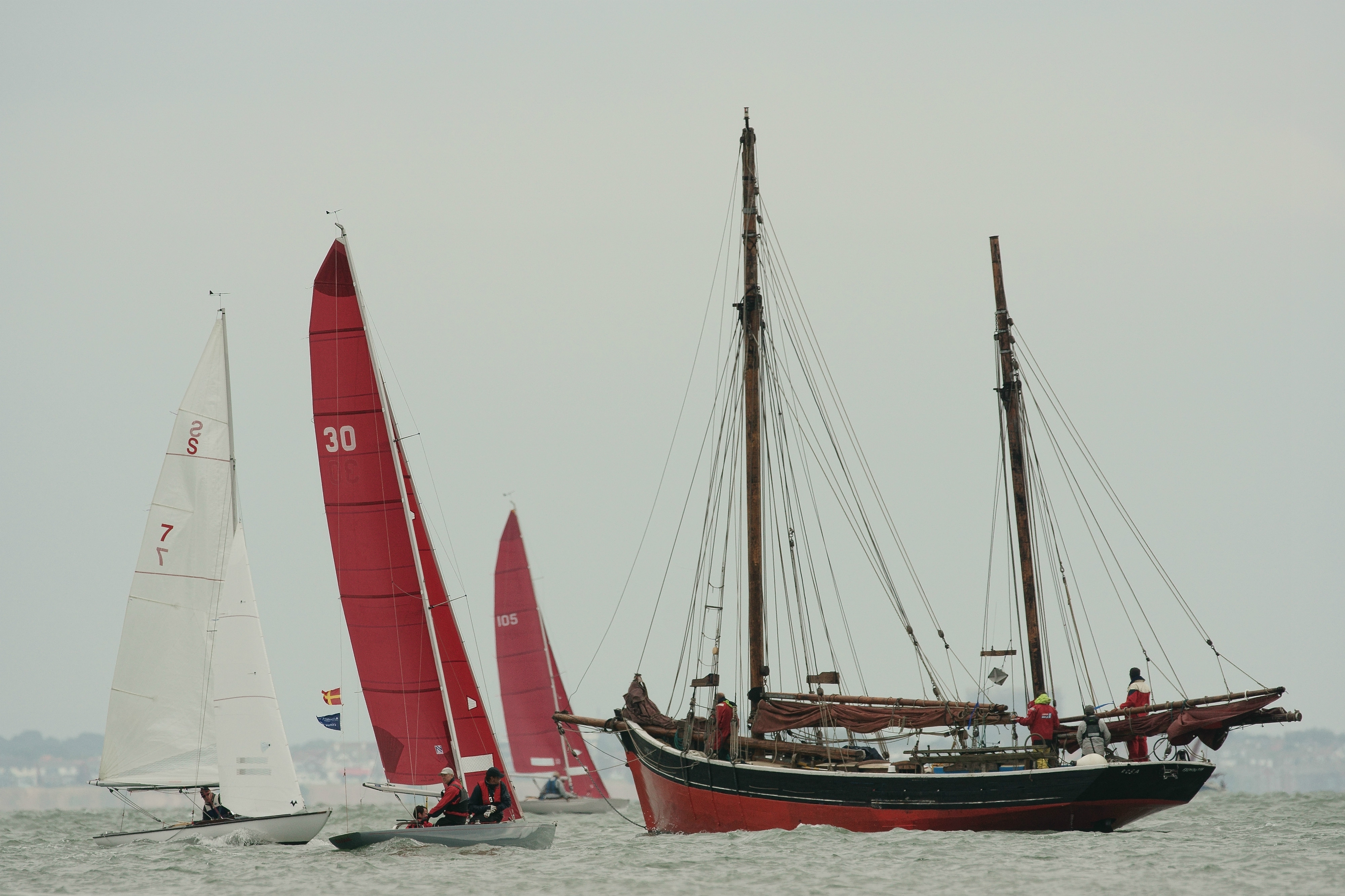

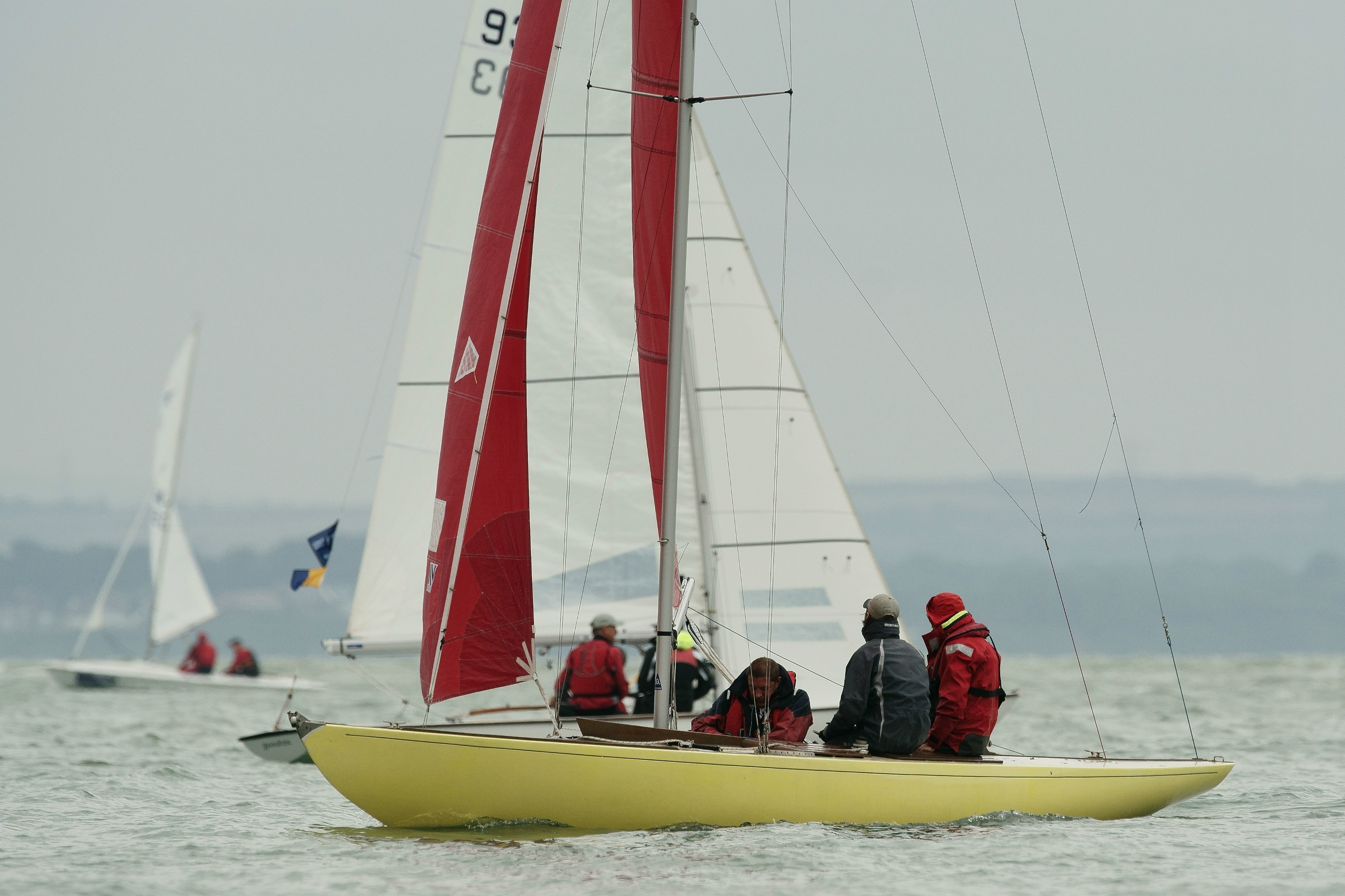

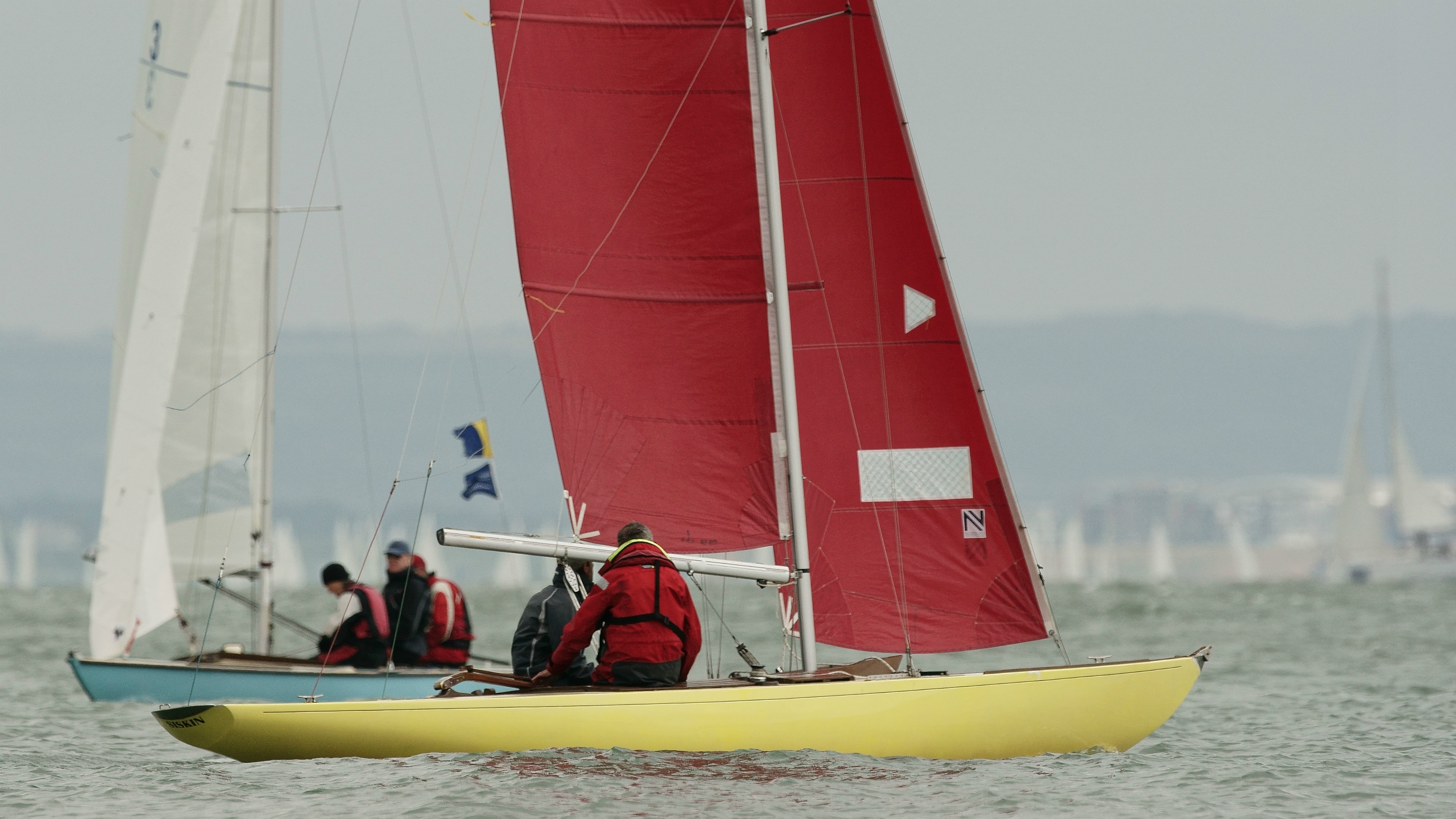

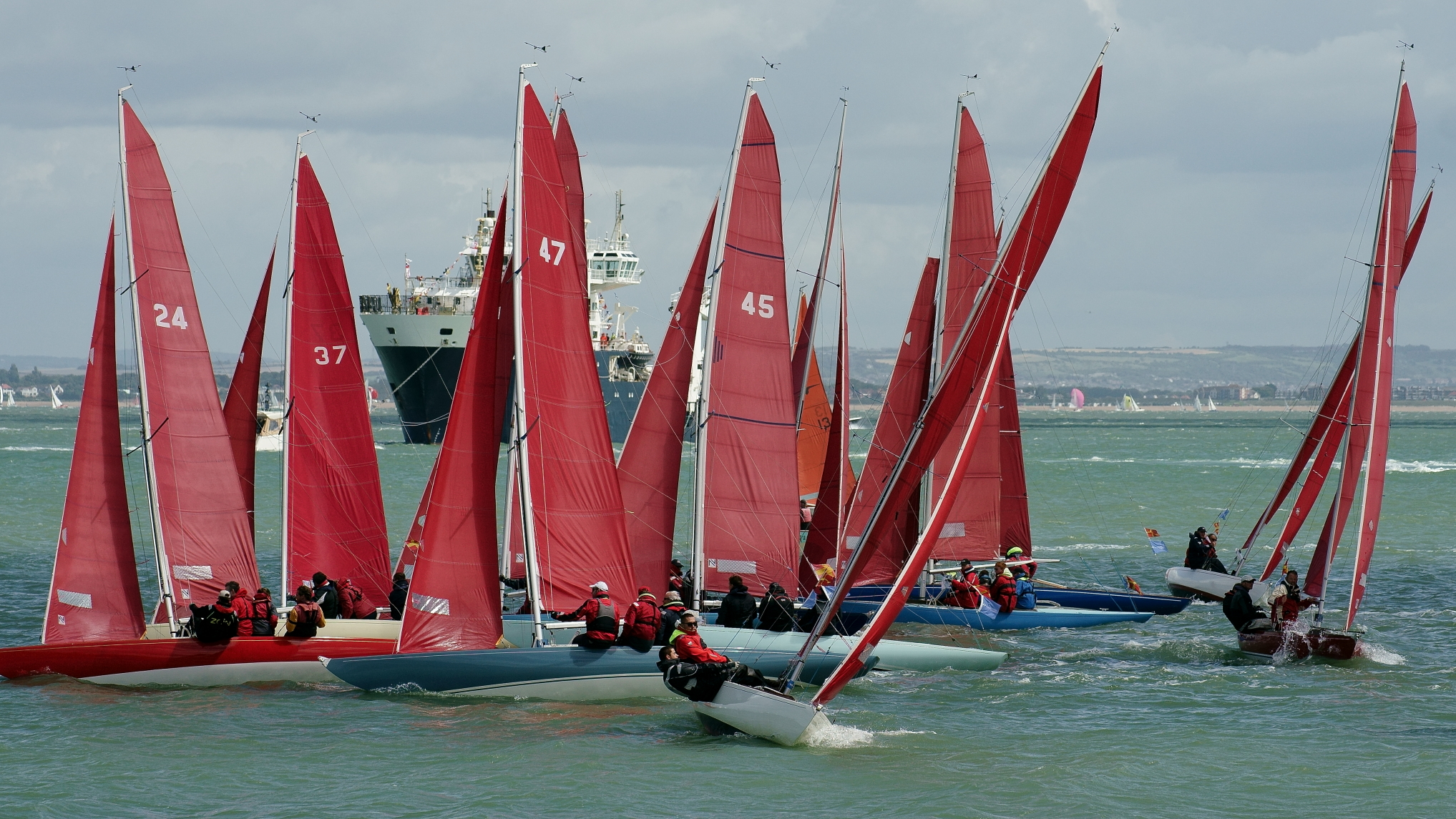

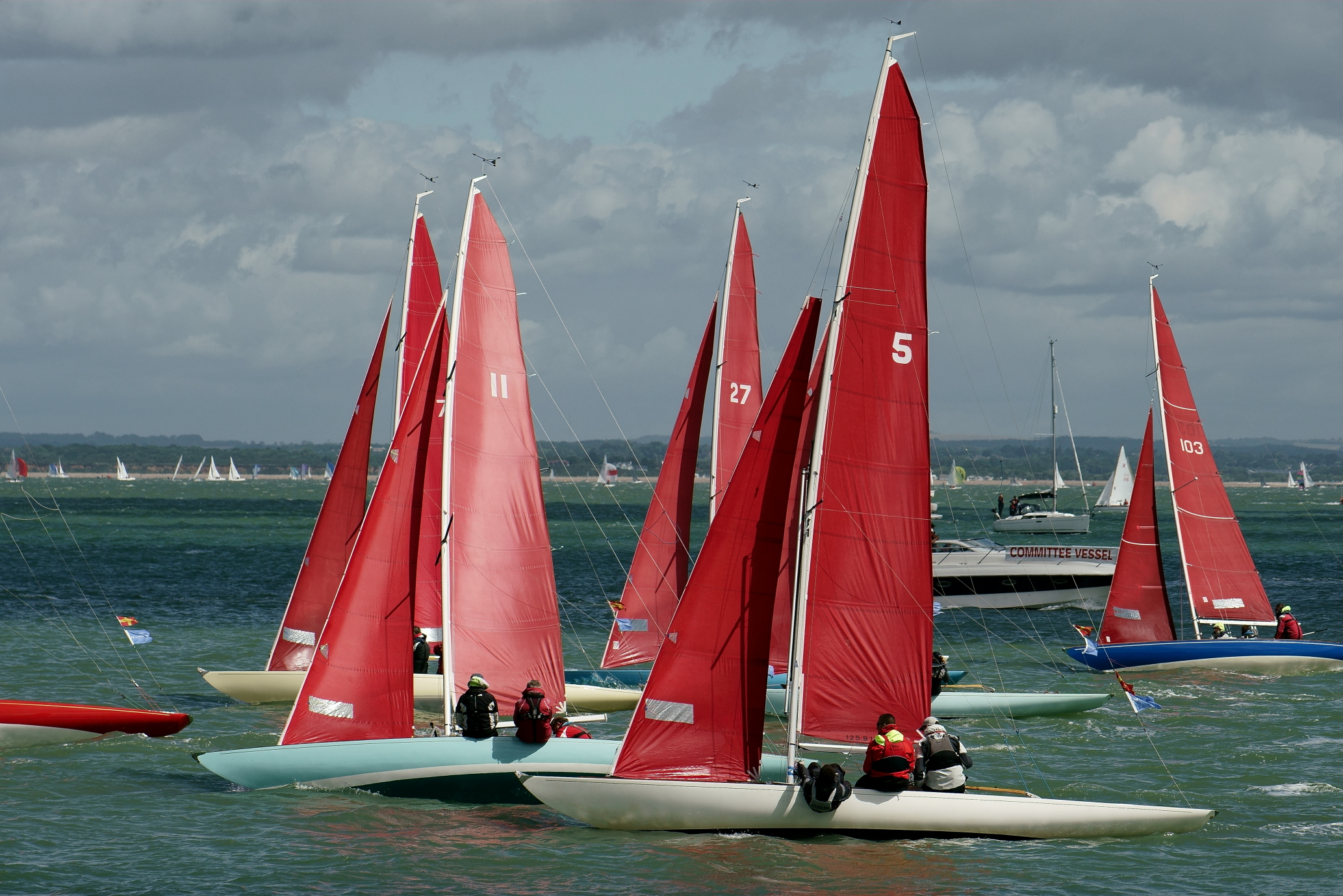

== First design ==
First batch, with owners
| Name | Year | Number | First Owner |
|---|---|---|---|
| Paroquet | 1897 | 1 | Captain de Boulay & Gerald Fitzgerald |
| Redstart | 1897 | 2 | Frank Hardcastle |
| Pink-Un | 1897 | 3 | GH Harrison |
| Redbreast | 1897 | 4 | Mr and Mrs BO Cochrane |
| Nautilus | 1897 | 5 | John I Thornycroft |
| Red Gauntlet | 1897 | 6 | HC Sutton |
| Fortuna | 1897 | 7 | The Honourable JB Denison |
| Bantam | 1897 | 8 | Dr A Bostock Hill |
| Flamingo | 1897 | 9 | Lt H Garside-Tipping RN |
| Windthrush | 1897 | 10 | Lt Colonel MacDonald Moreton |
| Peregrine | 1897 | 11 | Lt Colonel Honourable G Bertie & Mr Davenport Knight |
| Zeila | 1897 | 12 | Ross F Hime |
| Kitten | 1897 | 13 | Mr and Mrs JR Pennington Leigh |
| Circus Girl | 1897 | 14 | Captain Wade RE & Captain Lee RE |
| Styx | 1897 | 15 | G MacAndrews |
| Red Mullet | 1898 | 16 | Captain Rhodes |
| Scud | 1899 | 17 | GC Whitaker |
| Red Spinner | 1899 | 18 | FIB Beckford |
| Poppy | 1899 | 19 | Reverend GW Watkins |
| Kingfisher | 1901 | 2 | R Stuart Saville |
| Porpoise | 1901 | 20 | FF Tower |
| Petrel | 1901 | 21 | Sir James Houghton, 11th Baronet |
| Red Witch | 1900 | 13 | Earl of Harrington |
| Tout Passe | 1903 | 10 | Swinburn & Sheppard |
| Scarlet Runner | 1902 | 24 | AW & CH Haig |
| Coot | 1903 | 15 | Lt Crichton & Major Seely MP |
