= Parliamentary Secretary to the Treasury =

Formal title of UK governing party chief whip

United Kingdom: Parliamentary Secretary to the Treasury; Chief Whip
- Royal arms of His Majesty's Government

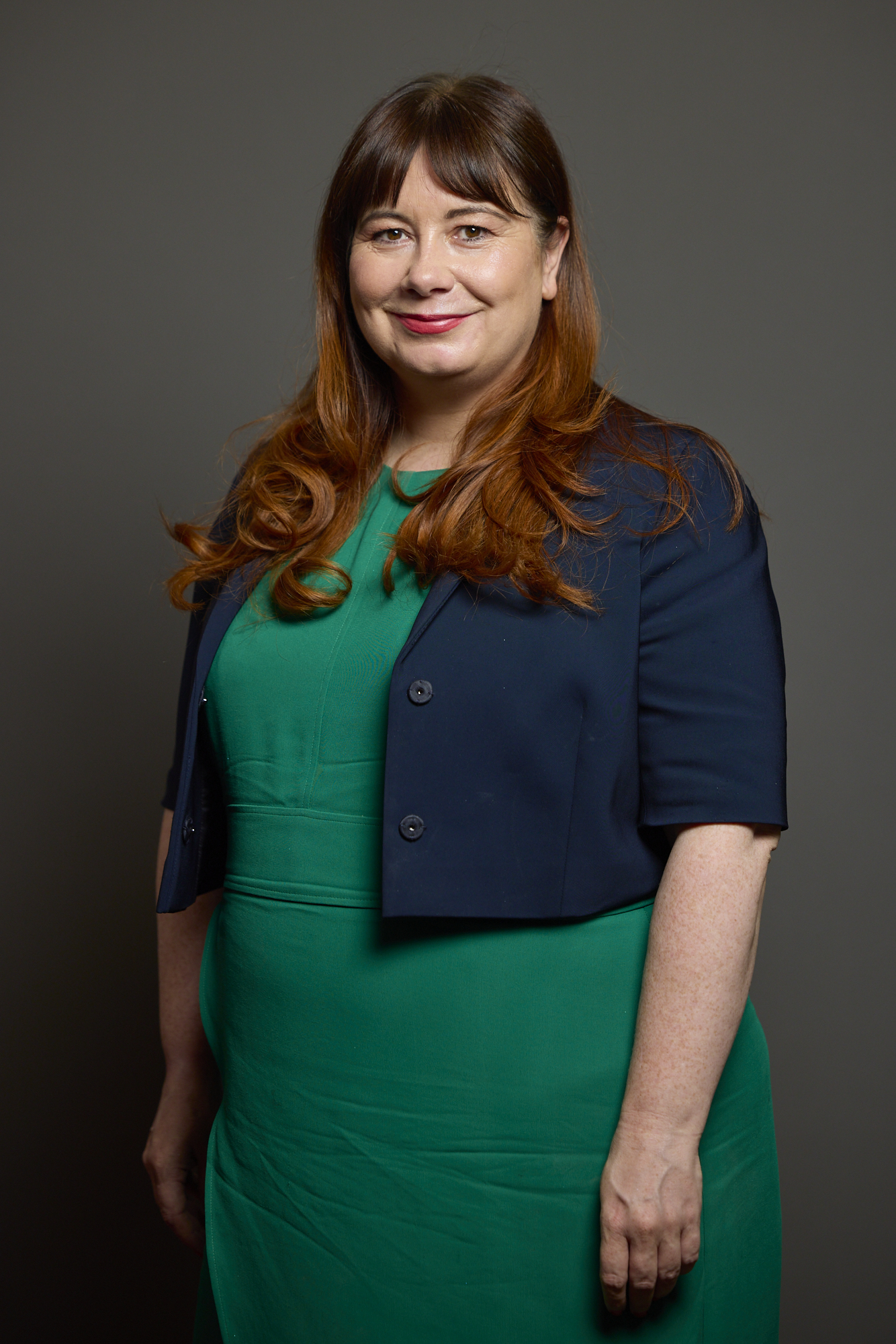
- Incumbent; Anneliese Midgley since 20 July 2026
- HM Treasury
- Style: Chief Whip (informal); The Right Honourable (within the UK and Commonwealth)
- Type: Minister of the Crown
- Member of: Cabinet (attending); Privy Council
- Reports to: Prime Minister
- Residence: 12 Downing Street (official)
- Seat: Westminster
- Appointer: The Monarch (on the advice of the prime minister)
- Inaugural holder: Sir Philip Warwick
- Formation: 1660
- Salary: £121,326 per annum (2022) (including £86,584 MP salary)
- Website: HM Treasury

Parliamentary Secretary to the Treasury is the official title of the most senior whip of the governing party in the Parliament of the United Kingdom. Today, any official links between the Treasury and this office are nominal and the title of the office can be seen as a sinecure that allows the incumbent to draw a Government salary, attend Cabinet, and use a Downing Street residence, traditionally 12 Downing Street.

The position is currently held by Anneliese Midgley since 20 July 2026.

== History ==
The position of Secretary to the Treasury was created in 1660. Until 1711, there was only one Secretary to the Treasury; however, in that year, a second position was created to help deal with the increasing workload. This new position was known as the junior secretary to the Treasury, and the existing post as the senior secretary to the Treasury. Initially, when the position of Senior Secretary to the Treasury became vacant (except as the result of an election causing a change of government), the junior secretary was usually automatically promoted to the senior role. Over time, however, the roles of the Senior and Junior Secretaries began to diverge, the Senior Secretary post being used as a sinecure post for the chief whip, with no formal responsibilities to the Treasury. The junior secretary post remained a substantive position working in the Treasury. As such, the senior secretary became known as the parliamentary secretary to the Treasury while the junior secretary became known as Financial Secretary to the Treasury, and the 'automatic' promotion from Junior to Senior ceased. While the exact date on which this change occurred is disputed, it is agreed that the distinction was complete by 1830. In the mid-nineteenth century, the parliamentary secretary to the Treasury was referred to as the patronage secretary to the Treasury.

== Parliamentary secretaries to the Treasury, 1830–present ==
=== 19th century ===
- Edward Ellice 1830–1832
- Charles Wood 1832–1834
- Sir George Clerk, 6th Baronet 1834–1835
- Edward Stanley 1835–1841
- Denis Le Marchant 1841
- Sir Thomas Fremantle, 1st Baronet 1841–1844
- John Young 1844–1846
- Henry Tufnell 1846–1850
- William Goodenough Hayter 1850–1852
- William Forbes Mackenzie 1852
- William Goodenough Hayter 1853–1858
- Sir William Jolliffe, 1st Baronet 1858–1859
- Henry Brand 1859–1866
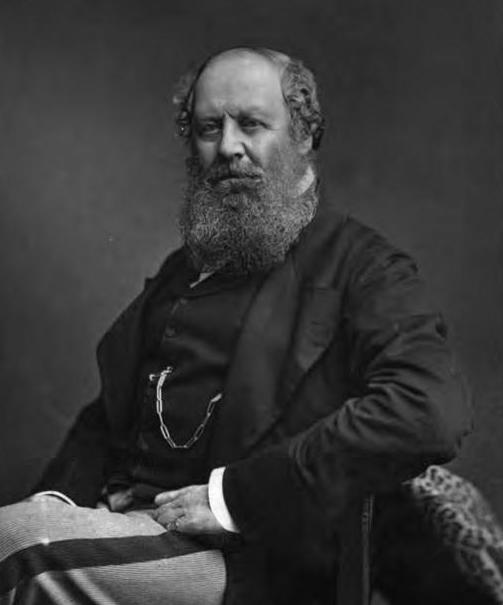
  Thomas Edward Taylor, Parliamentary Secretary to the Treasury from 1866 to 1868
- Thomas Edward Taylor 1866–1868
- Gerard Noel 1868
- George Glyn 1868–1873
- Arthur Wellesley Peel 1873–1874
- Sir William Hart Dyke, 7th Baronet 1874–1880
- Lord Richard Grosvenor 1880–1885
- Aretas Akers-Douglas 1885–1886
- Arnold Morley 1886
- Aretas Akers-Douglas 1886–1892
- Edward Marjoribanks 1892–1894
- Thomas Edward Ellis 1894–1895
- Sir William Walrond, 2nd Baronet 1895–1902

=== 20th century ===
- Sir Alexander Acland-Hood, 4th Baronet 1902–1905
- George Whiteley 1905–1908
- Jack Pease 1908–1910
- Alexander Murray, Master of Elibank 1910–1912
- Percy Holden Illingworth 1912–1915
- John William Gulland 1915
- Lord Edmund Talbot 1915–1916 (Conservative, jointly)
- John William Gulland 1915–1916 (Liberal, jointly)
- Lord Edmund Talbot 1916–1921 (Conservative, jointly)
- Neil Primrose 1916–1917 (Liberal, jointly)
- Frederick Guest 1917–1921 (Liberal, jointly)
- Leslie Orme Wilson 1921–1922 (Conservative, jointly)
- Charles McCurdy 1921–1922 (Liberal, jointly)
- Leslie Orme Wilson 1922–1923
- Bolton Eyres-Monsell 1923–1924
- Ben Spoor 1924
- Bolton Eyres-Monsell 1924–1929
- Tom Kennedy 1929–1931
- David Margesson 1931–1940
- Sir Charles Edwards 1940–1942 (Labour, jointly)
- James Gray Stuart 1941–1945 (Conservative, jointly)
- William Whiteley 1942–1951 (Labour, jointly until 1945)
- Patrick Buchan-Hepburn 1951–1955
- Edward Heath 1955–1959
- Martin Redmayne 1959–1964
- Ted Short 1964–1966
- John Silkin 1966–1969
- Bob Mellish 1969–1970
- Francis Pym 1970–1973
- Humphrey Atkins 1973–1974
- Bob Mellish 1974–1976
- Michael Cocks 1976–1979
- Michael Jopling 1979–1983
- John Wakeham 1983–1987
- David Waddington 1987–1989
- Tim Renton 1989–1990
- Richard Ryder 1990–1995
- Alastair Goodlad 1995–1997
- Nick Brown 1997–1998
- Ann Taylor 1998–2001

=== 21st century ===
Colour key (for political parties):

Conservative
Labour

Secretary	Term of office		Political party	Prime Minister
Hilary Armstrong	8 June 2001	5 May 2006	Labour	Tony Blair (II & III)
Jacqui Smith	5 May 2006	28 June 2007	Labour	Tony Blair (III)
Geoff Hoon	28 June 2007	3 October 2008	Labour	Gordon Brown (I)
Nick Brown	3 October 2008	11 May 2010	Labour	Gordon Brown (I)
Patrick McLoughlin	12 May 2010	4 September 2012	Conservative	David Cameron (Coalition)
Andrew Mitchell	4 September 2012	19 October 2012	Conservative	David Cameron (Coalition)
Sir George Young, 6th Baronet	19 October 2012	15 July 2014	Conservative	David Cameron (Coalition)
Michael Gove	15 July 2014	9 May 2015	Conservative	David Cameron (Coalition)
Mark Harper	9 May 2015	14 July 2016	Conservative	David Cameron (II)
Gavin Williamson	14 July 2016	2 November 2017	Conservative	Theresa May (I)
Julian Smith	2 November 2017	24 July 2019	Conservative	Theresa May (II)
Mark Spencer	24 July 2019	8 February 2022	Conservative	Boris Johnson (I & II)
Chris Heaton-Harris	8 February 2022	6 September 2022	Conservative	Boris Johnson (I)
Wendy Morton	6 September 2022	25 October 2022	Conservative	Liz Truss (I)
Simon Hart	25 October 2022	5 July 2024	Conservative	Rishi Sunak (I)
Alan Campbell	5 July 2024	5 September 2025	Labour	Keir Starmer (I)
Jonathan Reynolds	5 September 2025	20 July 2026	Labour	Keir Starmer (I)
Anneliese Midgley	20 July 2026	Incumbent	Labour	Andy Burnham (I)
