= Raymond Erith =

British architect (1904–1973)

Raymond Charles Erith RA FRIBA (7 August 1904 – 30 November 1973) was a leading classical architect in England during the period dominated by the modern movement after the Second World War. His work demonstrates his continual interest in expanding the classical tradition to establish a progressive modern architecture, drawing on the past.

Erith was appointed architect for the reconstruction of Downing Street (1958), elected a Royal Academician (1959) and served on the Royal Fine Art Commission (1960–73). Since his death, exhibitions of his work have been held by the Royal Academy of Arts (1976), Gainsborough's House, Sudbury (1979), Niall Hobhouse (1986) and Sir John Soane’s Museum (2004).

== Early years ==
Raymond Erith was born in London. He was the eldest son of Charles Erith, a mechanical engineer and his wife May. At the age of four he contracted tuberculosis, which led to twelve years of intermittent illness and left him permanently lame. He trained at the Architectural Association (1921–26) and worked for Percy Richard Morley Horder and Verner Owen Rees before setting up his own practice in London in 1928. He was commissioned by his aunt to remodel her house, Meadowside, at Loughton and to build an additional house to its rear. From 1929–39 he was in partnership with Bertram Hume, with whom he won an international competition for replanning the Lower Norrmalm area of Stockholm (1934).

In 1934 he married Pamela, younger daughter of Arthur and Elsie Spencer Jackson, who had also qualified at the AA. They had four daughters. In 1936 they moved to Dedham, Essex. Among Erith's early commissions were Great House, Dedham (1937) and gates, lodges and cottages in Windsor Great Park for King George VI (1939). Architectural historian Nickolaus Pevsner wrote in 1954 “There is nothing at Dedham to hurt the eye”. In 1938 the Dedham Vale Society was founded with Erith as its founding Chairman.

As a young man he looked back to the late eighteenth and early nineteenth centuries to pick up the thread of tradition while it was still unbroken and carry it forward from there. This led him to John Soane, an important influence on his early designs but later he turned to earlier sources of inspiration and especially to Palladio and the robust practicality of his farmhouse villas.

During the Second World War from 1940–45 Erith became a farmer in Essex, where he lived for the rest of his life. This experience and his country practice in East Anglia immediately after the war gave him a profound understanding of the local vernacular architecture, which was to have a subtle influence on his mature style.

== Post-war career ==
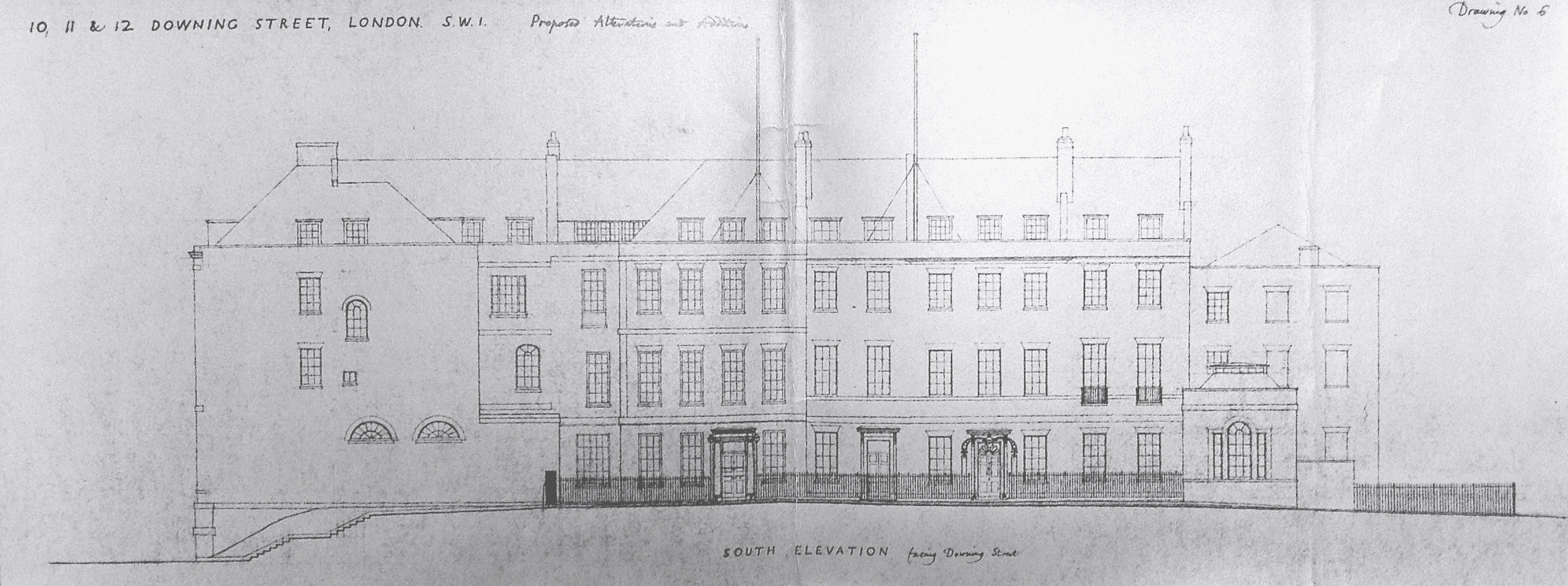
Erith's proposed alterations and additions to the south elevation of 10, 11, and 12 Downing Street, for the 1958 renovation of the buildings

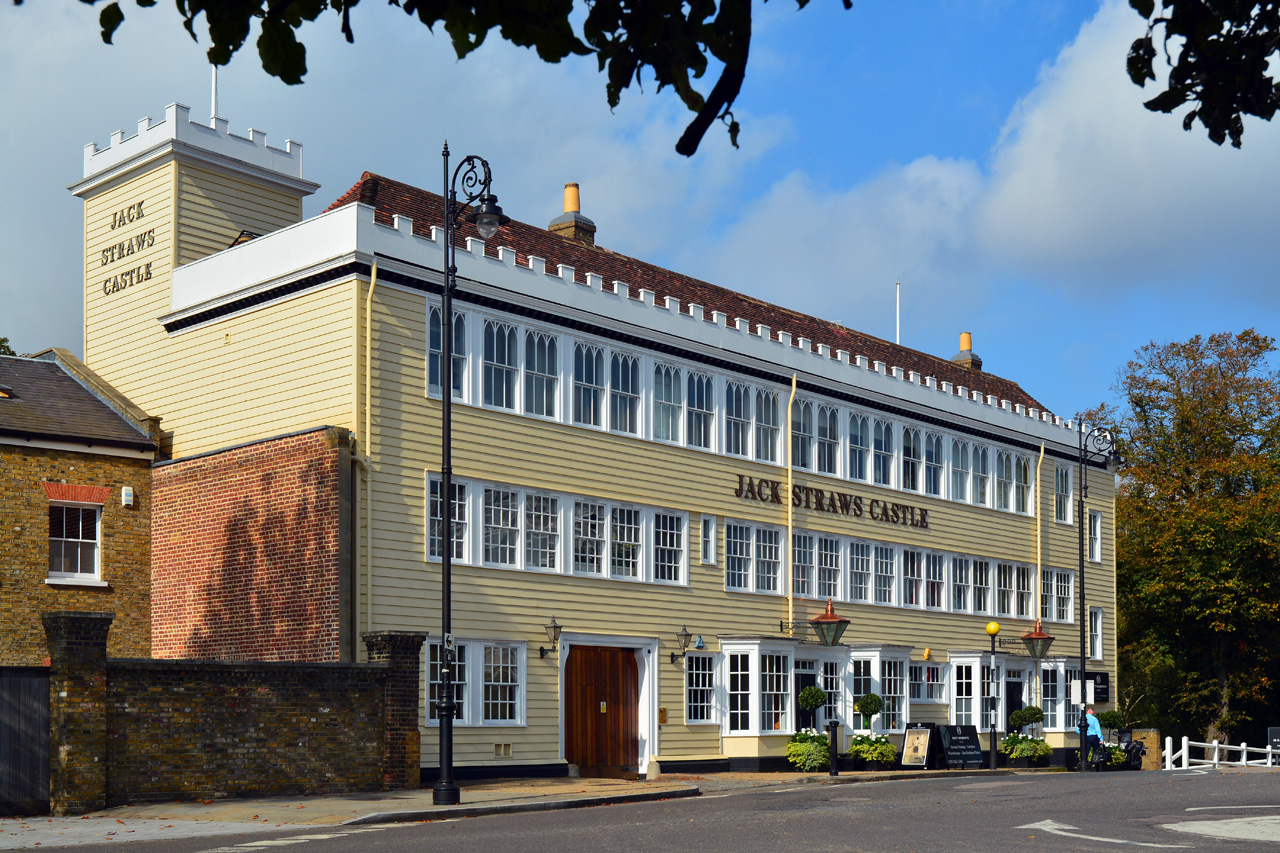
Jack Straw's Castle, 1967, designed by Raymond Erith

In 1946 Erith opened an office in Ipswich, moving it to Dedham in 1958. His architecture ranges from cottages and small houses to public buildings such as the Library and quadrangle at Lady Margaret Hall, Oxford (1959–1963), Jack Straw's Castle on Hampstead Heath (1963) and the New Common Room Building at Gray's Inn (1971). Major work includes 15,17 and 19, Aubrey Walk, London W8 (1951), The Pediment, Aynho, Northamptonshire, and its garden buildings (1956–73), the Provost's Lodgings at the Queen's College, Oxford (1958), and the Folly in Herefordshire (1961).

His larger country houses are Bentley, Sussex (1960–71), Wivenhoe New Park, Essex (1962), and King's Walden Bury, Hertfordshire (1969). The best known of his many restorations was the reconstruction of Nos 10 and 11 and complete rebuilding of No. 12, Downing Street (1959–63). He also remodelled numerous houses including Morley Hall, Wareside, Hertfordshire (1955), Wellingham House, Ringmer, Sussex (1955–71), Hunton Manor, Hampshire (1962), and Shelley's Folly, Cooksbridge, Sussex (1968).

After Erith's death in 1973, his partner Quinlan Terry carried on his practice (now Quinlan Terry Architects).

== Draughtsmanship ==
That Erith was an outstanding draughtsman is seen in his sketchbooks, working drawings and designs for the many competitions he entered in his early years. His fine drawings were regularly exhibited at the Royal Academy Summer Exhibitions. These showed many of his most important commissions, as well as unexecuted schemes such as a Factory, Warehouse, Offices etc. at Ipswich (1948), a House in Devonshire to be called the Redoubt for Mr Freeman (1949) and Variation on a theme by Palladio: Design for a Church in Italy (1952).

From 1962 onwards Erith’s designs were regularly exhibited at the RA in the form of linocuts by Quinlan Terry, who became his pupil in 1962 and subsequently his partner.
