= 9 Downing Street =

Row house in Westminster

Coordinates: 51.5033°N 0.1269°W

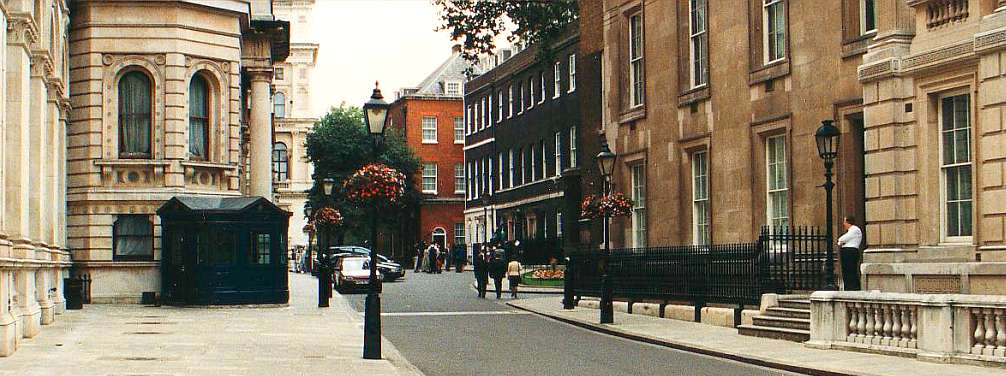
Downing Street looking west, with No. 9 on the right

9 Downing Street is one of the buildings situated on Downing Street in the City of Westminster in London, England. It has been used as a separate address to the better known 10 Downing Street since 2001 for various government functions.

== History ==
The building was previously part of the more famous 10 Downing Street, which has been the official residence of the First Lord of the Treasury since 1732. This is normally the prime minister of the United Kingdom. Many internal refurbishments over the years have altered the interior of 10 Downing Street, 11 Downing Street and 12 Downing Street to the point that they are all part of a single complex. It was as part of a reorganisation in 2001 that the number 9 address was created.

The Judicial Committee of the Privy Council was based at 9 Downing Street until August 2009, when it moved to Middlesex Guildhall with the Supreme Court of the United Kingdom. It subsequently housed the offices of the Chief Whip, though their official address remained No. 12. From 2016 until 2020 the building was used to house the Department for Exiting the European Union.

In January 2020, the government began hosting lobby briefings at 9 Downing Street instead of the traditional location in the House of Commons. The move was criticised by journalists. That year the building began undergoing a £2.6-million refurbishment in preparation for televised press briefings to be held.

The Downing Street Press Briefing Room is located in No. 9; the first press conferences were held there by Boris Johnson in March 2021.

== Cultural references ==
In the 1980s British satirical show Spitting Image, Adolf Hitler is presented as living at 9 Downing Street under the name of Herr Willcocks and offering political assistance to the unaware Prime Minister Margaret Thatcher.
