= Downing Street =

Street in London, England

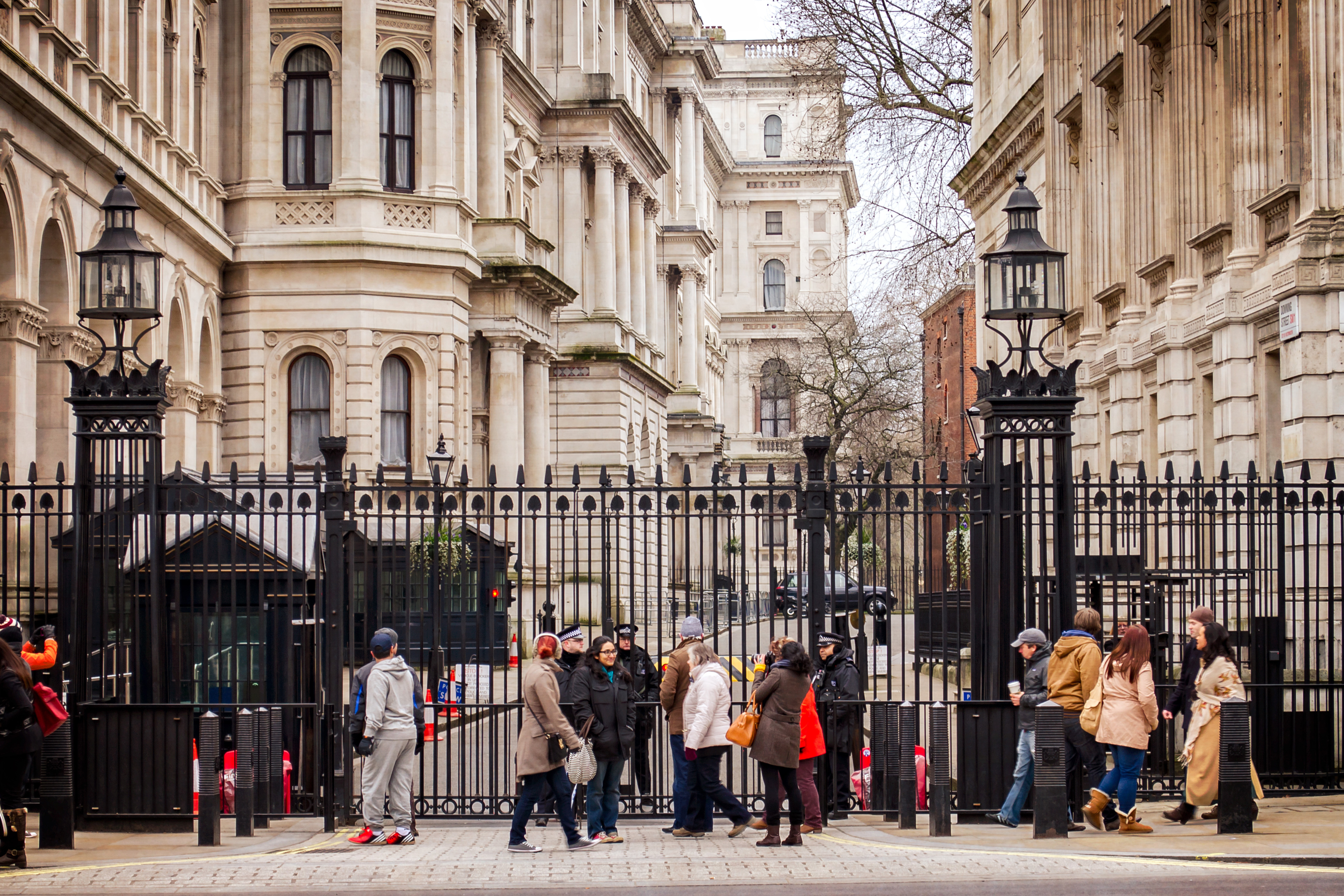
- Downing Street seen from Whitehall, 2013
- Interactive map of Downing Street
- Namesake: Sir George Downing, 1st Baronet
- Owner: UK Government
- Length: 217 m (712 ft)
- Postal code: SW1A
- Coordinates: 51.5034°N 0.1276°W
- From: Whitehall

Construction
- Completion: 1680

Other
- Known for: Official residences and offices of the prime minister of the United Kingdom, Chief Mouser to the Cabinet Office and the chancellor of the exchequer
- Status: Closed to public

Downing Street is a gated street in Westminster in London that houses the official residences and offices of the Prime Minister of the United Kingdom and the Chancellor of the Exchequer in a cul-de-sac situated off Whitehall. It is 200 metres (660 ft) long, and a few minutes' walk from the Houses of Parliament. Downing Street was developed in the 1680s by Sir George Downing.

For more than three hundred years, it has held the official residences of both the First Lord of the Treasury, the office now synonymous with that of the Prime Minister, and the Second Lord of the Treasury, the office held by the Chancellor of the Exchequer. The Prime Minister's official residence is 10 Downing Street, and the Chancellor's official residence is Number 11. The government's Chief Whip has an official residence at Number 12. (Note: In practice, these office-holders may live in different flats in the complex, depending on their and their family's requirements.) Over time, government offices and officials came to occupy most of the street's townhouses. The houses on the south side of the street were demolished in the 19th century to make way for government offices now occupied by the Foreign, Commonwealth and Development Office. Opposite, for part of the street, the Cabinet Office, initially Treasury, was built to face Whitehall.

The term "Downing Street" is also used as a metonym for the Prime Minister or the British Government more generally.

== History ==
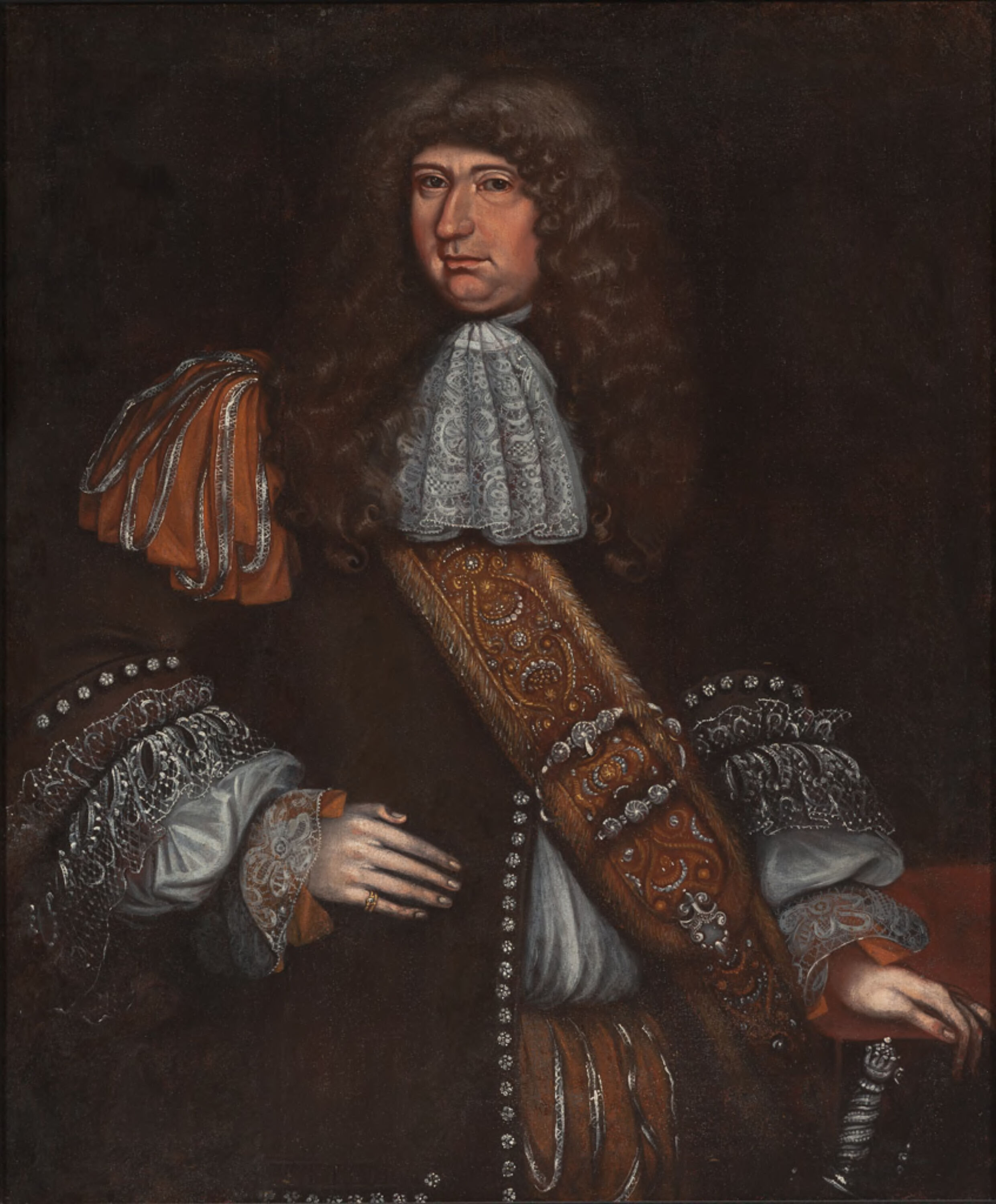
Possible portrait of Sir George Downing by Thomas Smith, painted between c. 1675–1690

The street was built in the 1680s by Sir George Downing, 1st Baronet, on the site of a mansion, Hampden House. Little is known about what was on the site before the mansion, but there is evidence of a brewhouse called 'The Axe', owned by the Abbey of Abingdon, and the premises of the goldsmith Everard Everdyes.

Downing was a soldier and diplomat who served under Oliver Cromwell and King Charles II, and who invested in properties and acquired considerable wealth. In 1654, he purchased the lease on land east of St James's Park, adjacent to the House at the Back, and within walking distance of Parliament. Downing planned to build a row of townhouses "for persons of good quality to inhabit". However, the Hampden family had a lease which prevented their construction for 30 years. When the Hampden lease expired, Downing received permission to build further west to take advantage of recent developments. The new warrant issued in 1682 reads: "Sir George Downing ... [is authorised] to build new and more houses further westward on the grounds granted him by the patent of 1663/4 Feb. 23. The present grant is by reason that the said Cockpit or the greater part thereof is since demolished; but it is to be subject to the proviso that it be not built any nearer than 14 feet of the wall of the said Park at the West end thereof."

Between 1682 and 1684, Downing built the cul-de-sac of two-storey townhouses with coach-houses, stables, and views of St James's Park. How many he built is not clear; most historians say 15, others say 20. The addresses changed several times; Number 10 was numbered 5 for a while, and was renumbered in 1787. Downing employed Sir Christopher Wren to design the houses. Although large, they were erected quickly and cheaply on soft soil with shallow foundations. The fronts had facades with lines painted on the surface imitating brick mortar. Winston Churchill wrote that Number 10 was "shaky and lightly built by the profiteering contractor whose name they bear".

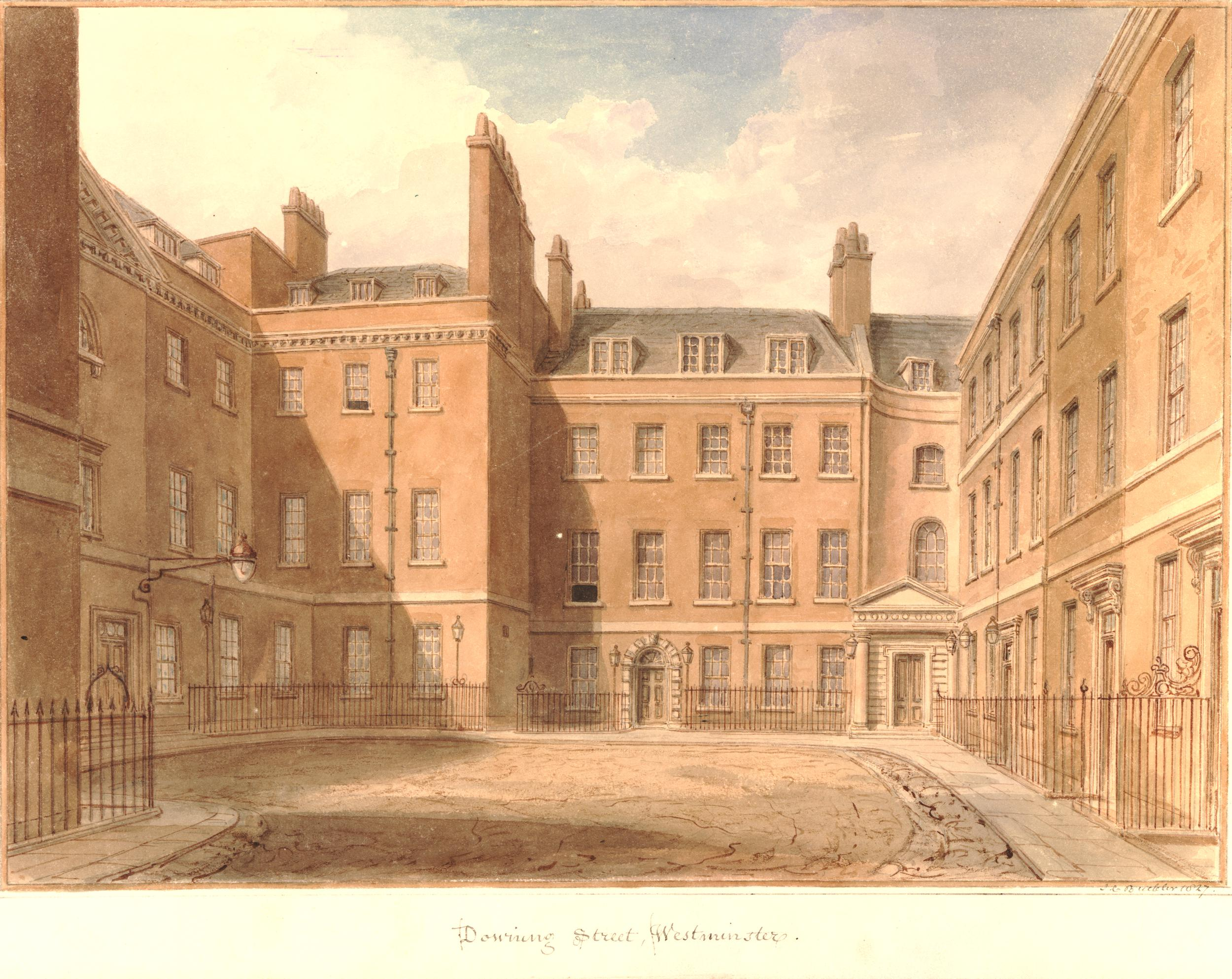
View of the old Foreign Office and other buildings on Downing Street in an 1827 watercolour by John Chessell Buckler

The upper end of the Downing Street cul-de-sac closed access to St James's Park, making the street quiet and private. An advertisement in 1720 described it as "a pretty open Place, especially at the upper end, where are four or five very large and well-built Houses, fit for Persons of Honour and Quality; each House having a pleasant Prospect into St James's Park, with a Tarras Walk". The houses had several distinguished residents. The Countess of Yarmouth lived at Number 10 between 1688 and 1689, Lord Lansdowne from 1692 to 1696, and the Earl of Grantham from 1699 to 1703. The diarist James Boswell took rooms in Downing Street during his stay in London during 1762–63 at a rent of £22 per annum. He records having dealings with prostitutes in the adjacent park.

Downing probably never lived in his townhouses. In 1675, he retired to Cambridge, where he died a few months after the houses were completed. His portrait hangs in the entrance foyer of the modern Number 10.

Downing College, Cambridge was founded in 1800, under the terms of the will of Sir George Downing, 3rd Baronet (died 1749). A door from Number 10 is in use in the college.

The houses between Number 9 and Whitehall were acquired by the government and demolished in 1824 to allow the construction of the Privy Council Office, Board of Trade, and Treasury offices. In 1861, the houses on the south side of Downing Street were replaced by purpose-built government offices for the Foreign Office, India Office, Colonial Office, and the Home Office.

Restoration and refurbishing in the 1960s and '70s revealed the bricks of Downing Street to be yellow, the type common to London houses; their blackened appearance was the result of centuries of smog and pollution. To avoid altering the iconic look of the street, the restorers painted the bricks black once they had cleaned them.

== Houses ==
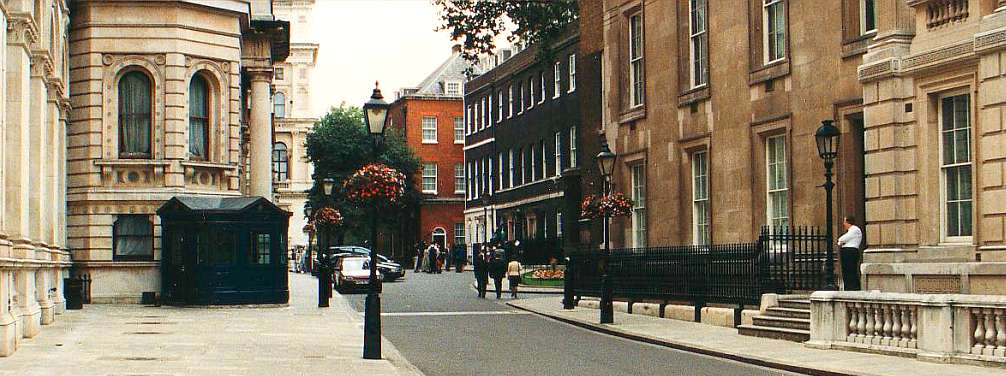
Downing Street looking west. The Foreign and Commonwealth Office is on the left, the red house is No. 12, the dark houses are No. 11 and No. 10 (nearer, and partially obscured), and the building on the right is the Barry wing of the Cabinet Office, which has its main frontage to Whitehall.

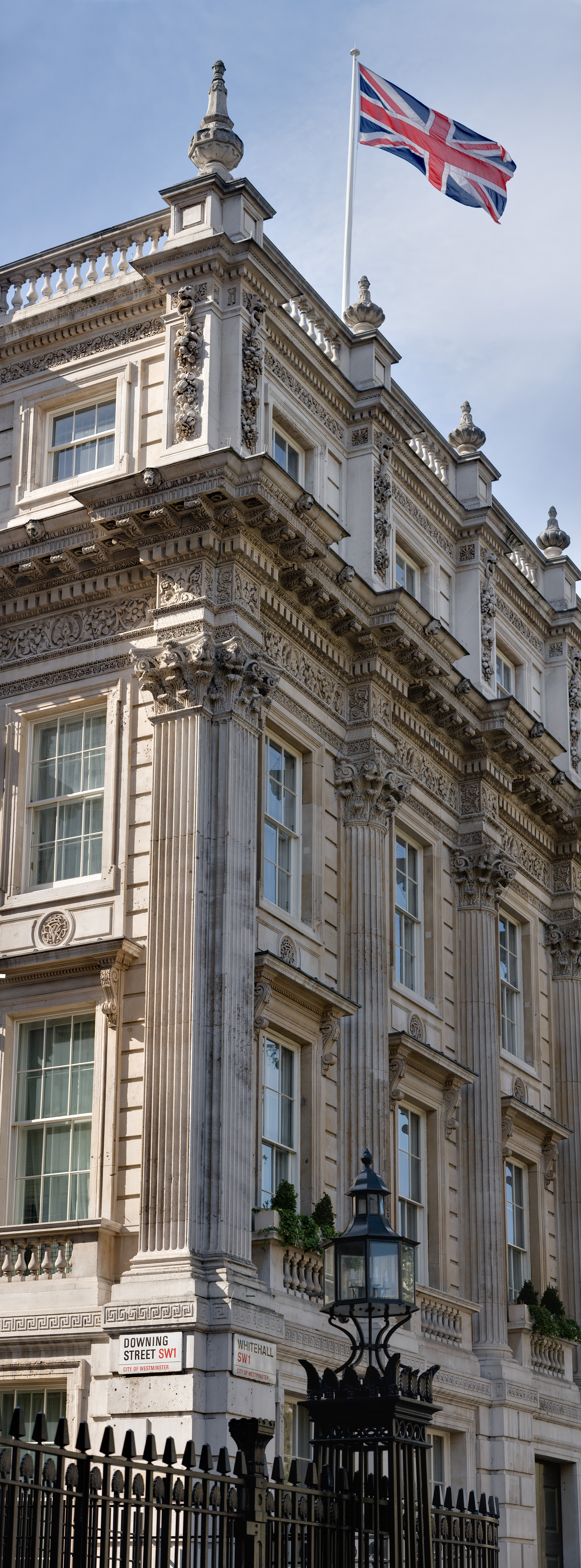
A corner at Downing Street and Whitehall

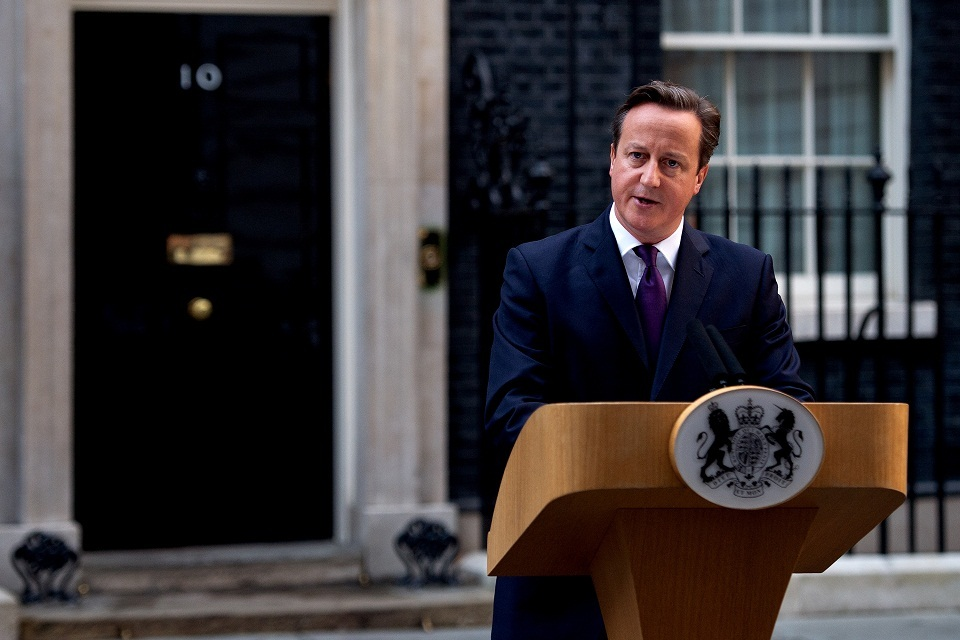
Prime Minister David Cameron in 2014. Press announcements are regularly held in the street, as here.

- 1–8 Downing Street were the houses between Number 9 and Whitehall that were taken over by the government and demolished in 1825 to allow the construction of a new building, designed by John Soane, to house the Privy Council Office, and the Board of Trade.
- 9 Downing Street is the location of the Downing Street Press Briefing Room. It formerly held the offices for previous ministerial departments, which have since been dissolved or moved. Since 2014, it has housed the offices of the Chief Whip, though their official address remained No. 12.
- 10 Downing Street is the official residence of the First Lord of the Treasury, the prime minister of the United Kingdom. The two roles have been filled by the same person since the 1720s with almost no exceptions. It has fulfilled this role since 1735. Originally three houses, Number 10 was offered to Sir Robert Walpole by King George II in 1732 and now contains approximately 100 rooms. A private residence occupies the third floor, and there is a kitchen in the basement. The other floors contain offices and conference, reception, sitting, and dining rooms where the Prime Minister works, and where government ministers, national leaders, and foreign dignitaries are met and entertained. At the rear is an interior courtyard and a terrace overlooking a garden of 0.5 acres (2,000 m^{2}). Other residents of 10 Downing Street are the spouse of the prime minister and family, Downing Street Director of Communications and Chief Mouser to the Cabinet Office.
- 11 Downing Street has been the official residence of the Second Lord of the Treasury, the chancellor of the exchequer since 1828. The residence was built alongside the official residence of the prime minister at Number 10 in 1682.
- 12 Downing Street, formerly the Chief Whip's Office, houses the Prime Minister's Press Office, Strategic Communications Unit and Information and Research Unit. In the 1820s, it was occupied by the judge advocate-general, although it remained in private ownership. It entered government hands when purchased by the East India Company in 1863, and was occupied by the marine and railway departments of the Board of Trade. It was badly damaged by fire in 1879 and underwent further changes.
- 13 Downing Street was originally part of 12 Downing Street before the housing area was partially re-built and re-numbered in 1876.
- 14 Downing Street formerly closed off the western end of the street. It was leased as a townhouse from 1723 to 1797. It was acquired by the Crown in 1798, and was used by the War Office and Colonial Office in the 19th century. Some parts were demolished in the 1860s, and by 1876, it had been removed completely.
- 15–20 Downing Street, long since demolished, were at one time houses leading up to Horse Guards Road. 15-16 formerly housed the Foreign Office, which also occupied two houses on the south side of the street. 18 was occupied by the West India Department of the Colonial Office, and 20 was occupied by the Tithe Commission.

The houses at the end of the street were arranged around Downing Square.

There used to be a public house, the Rose and Crown, in Downing Street. In 1830, the tenant was a Mr Dixon.

Throughout the history of these houses, ministers have lived by agreement in whatever rooms they thought necessary. On some occasions, Number 11 has been occupied not by the Chancellor of the Exchequer but by the individual considered to be the nominal deputy Prime Minister (whether or not they actually took the title); this was particularly common in coalition governments. Sometimes a minister only uses the Downing Street flat for formal occasions and lives elsewhere.

In 1881, William Ewart Gladstone claimed residence in numbers 10, 11, and 12 for himself and his family. He was both Chancellor of the Exchequer and Prime Minister at the time.

After the 1997 general election, in which Labour took power, a swap was carried out by the new incumbents of the two titles; Tony Blair being a married man with three children living at home, while his counterpart Gordon Brown was unmarried at the time of taking up his post. Although Number 10 was the Prime Minister's official residence and contained the prime ministerial offices, Blair and his family actually moved into the more spacious Number 11, while Brown lived in the more meagre apartments of Number 10. This was the second time this had occurred; Stafford Northcote lived in Number 10 at one point, while Benjamin Disraeli occupied Number 11. That was for precisely the same reason—at the time, Number 11 was the more spacious apartment and Sir Stafford had a larger family. Blair and Brown's arrangement continued between Brown (at Number 11) and Alistair Darling (at Number 10), and continued in the Cameron ministry (with David Cameron at Number 11 and George Osborne at Number 10) and under the premiership of Theresa May, with Theresa May at Number 11 and Philip Hammond at Number 10. Boris Johnson similarly resided at Number 11.

== Security gates ==
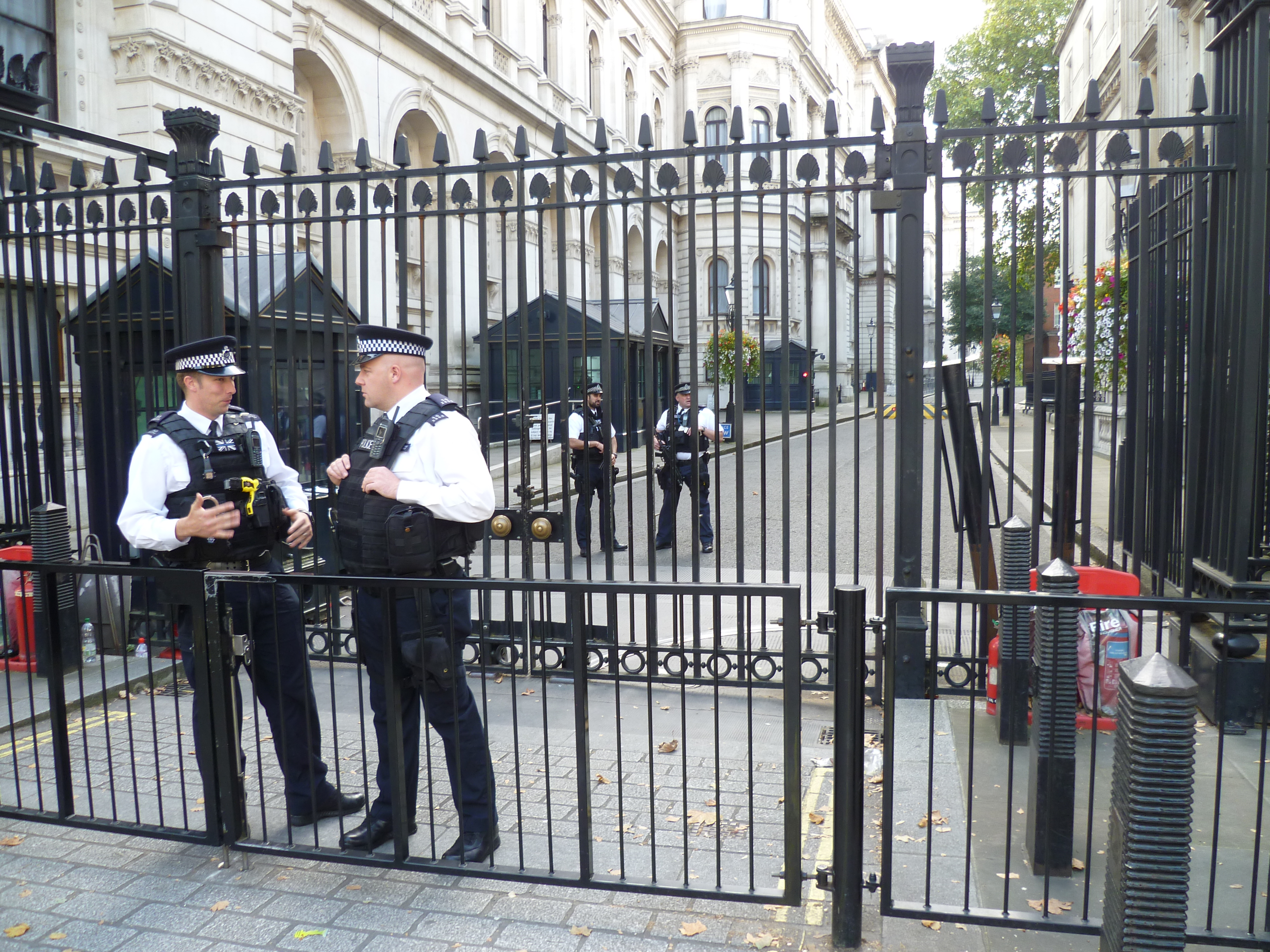
The gates at the entrance to Downing Street

Barriers were erected at the St James's Park end of the street for the unveiling of the Cenotaph on 11 November 1920. They were a public safety measure intended to prevent the crowds in Whitehall from becoming too dense.

When the Irish War of Independence became increasingly violent, it was decided to retain the barriers, which were raised and strengthened. On 26 November 1920, construction commenced on a wooden barricade, 8 feet (2.4 m) high at the end of the street. They were described as being of a "substantial character" mounted on proper foundations and incorporating vehicle gates. The barriers were taken down in 1922 when the Irish Free State was created.

Vehicle access was curtailed in 1973 when metal barriers were placed across the entrance to the street. In 1974, the Metropolitan Police proposed erecting a semi-permanent barrier between the pavement and carriageway on the Foreign Office side to keep pedestrians off the main part of the street. The proposal came with assurances that tourists would still be permitted to take photographs at the door of Number 10. The Prime Minister, Harold Wilson, rejected the proposal, feeling that it would appear to be an unacceptable restriction of the freedom of the public. Wilson's private secretary wrote: "I much regret this further erosion of the Englishman's right to wander at will in Downing Street."

In 1982, access was further restricted by railings and a demountable gate. They were replaced by black steel gates in 1989. The increase in security was due to an increase in violence, particularly by the IRA during The Troubles. The Thatcher ministry was particularly moved to increase security after the 1979 Assassination of Lord Mountbatten.

Access through these gates led to a political scandal known as Plebgate (or Gategate), which started in September 2012. The trigger was an altercation between Conservative Chief Whip Andrew Mitchell and the police officers on duty at these gates. Mitchell had to resign as the Government Chief Whip because of the incident.

On the afternoon of 25 May 2023, the gates were damaged when a car crashed into them. The Prime Minister was inside 10 Downing Street at the time. A man was arrested by police, and the incident was not terrorism related.

=== Public right of way ===
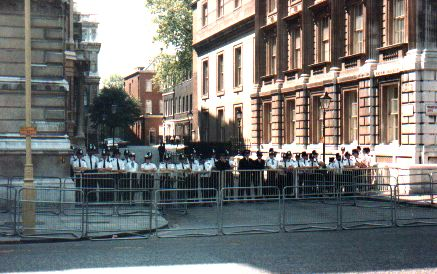
Downing Street in the late 1980s, before the gates were installed

Technically speaking, the public right of way along Downing Street has not been extinguished nor subject to a gating order, and the road retains the status of a public highway maintained by Westminster City Council. Public access was curtailed by relying on common law powers to prevent breach of the peace (although its legality has been questioned by a correspondent for New Statesman magazine).

In 2005, Westminster City Council used anti-terrorism powers contained in the Civil Contingencies Act 2004 to formalise the restrictions by means of a traffic management order. This by implication results in Downing Street being inaccessible to the general public as admittance is only granted by the Police to scheduled visitors, Parliamentary pass holders and members of the accredited press.

Although the Downing Street government buildings and grounds are a designated site under the Serious Organised Crime and Police Act 2005 for criminal trespass, the street was not included in the boundaries of the designated area.

=== Security ===
Since 1989, entering Downing Street has required passing through a security checkpoint. The street is patrolled by armed police from the Diplomatic Protection Group, and there is usually at least one police officer outside the front door of Number 10. Security was tightened after 10 Downing Street was mortar bombed by the IRA in 1991 and again after the 11 September attacks.

== See also ==
- Downing Street Christmas Tree
- List of eponymous roads in London
