= Whip (politics) =

Position within some political parties

A whip is an official of a political party whose task is to ensure party discipline (that members of the party vote according to the party platform rather than their constituents, individual conscience or donors) in a legislature.

Whips are the party's vote organisers and go-betweens. They work to ensure that their fellow political party legislators attend voting sessions and vote according to their party's official policy. Members who vote against party policy may "lose the whip", being suspended from the party.

The term is said to be taken from the "whipper-in" during a hunt, who tries to prevent hounds from wandering away from a hunting pack.

Additionally, the term "whip" may mean the voting instructions issued to legislators, or the status of a certain legislator in their party's parliamentary grouping.

== Etymology ==
The expression whip in its parliamentary context derives from its origins in hunting terminology. The Oxford English Dictionary defines the term whipper-in as "a huntsman's assistant who keeps the hounds from straying by driving them back with the whip into the main body of the pack". According to that dictionary, the first recorded use of the term whipper-in in the parliamentary sense occurs in 1772. However, P. D. G. Thomas in House of Commons in the Eighteenth Century cites two examples of the use of the term that predate 1772.

It was within the context of such summonses to members out of town that the first known Parliamentary instance of the use of the term "whip" occurred. In the debate of 8 May 1769 on a petition from some Middlesex freeholders against the seating of Henry Luttrell instead of John Wilkes, Edmund Burke mentioned that the ministry had sent for their friends to the north and to Paris, "whipping them in, than which, he said, there could not be a better phrase". Although Burke's particular emphasis on the expression implied its comparative novelty, the hunting term had been used in this political context for at least a generation: on 18 November 1742 Heneage Finch remarked in a letter to Lord Malton that "the Whigs for once in their lives have whipped in better than the Tories".

== In countries using the Westminster system ==
=== Australia ===
In the Parliament of Australia, as well as in the parliaments of the six states and two self-governing territories, major political parties have whips to ensure party discipline and carry out a variety of other functions on behalf of the party leadership. The most important function of the whip's office is to ensure that all members and senators are present to take part in votes in the chamber (maintaining quorum and preventing censure motions). Unlike in the United Kingdom, Australian whips do not hold official office, but they are recognised for parliamentary purposes. In practice, Australian whips play a lesser role than their counterparts in the United Kingdom, as party discipline in Australia tends to be tighter.

Their roles in the chamber include taking divisions, and maintaining a "pairs book" which controls the ability of members and senators to leave the parliament building during sittings, as well as the entitlement to be absent during divisions.

Liberal Party whips are appointed by the leader of the party, while Australian Labor Party whips are elected by the Caucus. For Labor and the Liberals, the chief whip is assisted by two deputy whips.

=== Canada ===
In Canada the Party Whip is the member of a political party in the Canadian House of Commons, the Canadian Senate or a provincial legislature charged with ensuring party discipline among members of the caucus. In the House of Commons, the whip's office prepares and distributes vote sheets identifying the party position on each bill or motion. The whip is also responsible for assigning offices and scheduling speakers from his or her party for various bills, motions and other proceedings in the House.

=== Bangladesh ===
In Bangladesh, the concept of the whip was inherited from colonial British rule. The Chief Whip is a member of the parliament of Bangladesh from the ruling party who is responsible for the maintenance of party discipline inside the parliament.

The work of the whip is to ensure the proper participation (as the party wants) of the party MPs in the activities of the parliament, such as voting, If the leader and deputy leader of parliament are absent, the whip can speak for them.

=== India ===
In India, every major political party appoints a whip, who is responsible for the party's discipline and behaviours on the floor of the house. Usually, they direct the party members to stick to the party's stand on certain issues and directs them to vote as per the direction of senior party members. However, there are some cases such as Indian Presidential elections where whips cannot direct a Member of Parliament (MP) or Member of Legislative Assembly (MLA) on whom to vote. Should a whip's order be violated by a member of the same party, then the whip can recommend immediate dismissal of that member from the house due to indiscipline and the Speaker of the respective house can decide on the matter (without time limit). Should the whip choose not to follow up on the violation of their official whip order by the own party member due to any reason, then any member of house can do so to the Speaker.

=== Ireland ===
Whips exist for all parliamentary parties in Dáil Éireann and Seanad Éireann. The government chief whip is normally a Minister of State at the Department of the Taoiseach, and attends cabinet meetings. The whips of each house meet weekly to set the agenda for the next week's business. The Technical Group in the Dáil and the analogous Independent groups in the Seanad nominate whips to attend these meetings even though there is no party line for their whips to enforce. Whips also coordinate pairing.

The timing of most votes are difficult to predict and TDs are expected to stay within earshot of the division bell at all times. All TDs are expected to vote with their party and to receive permission if they intend to be absent for a vote. Free votes are not a common feature of the Irish parliamentary tradition but they do happen on occasion, and there are calls for them to happen more often. For instance, Fianna Fáil usually allowed a free vote on abortion bills, as in the Protection of Human Life In Pregnancy Act.

From 1998, whips and assistant whips may be entitled to an allowance on top of their base legislator's salary. In 2011, these allowances varied proportional to the size of the group, with Fianna Fáil's Dáil whip's allowance the highest at €19,000.

=== Malaysia ===
Party whips in Malaysia serve a similar role as in other Westminster system-based parliamentary democracies. However, party discipline tends to be tighter in Malaysia and therefore the role of the whip is generally less important, though its importance is heightened when the government majority is less in the lower house.

=== New Zealand ===
In New Zealand, the concept of the whip was inherited from British rule. All political parties that have four or more members in Parliament have at least one party whip, although Green Party whips are called musterers. Parties with 25 to 44 members are allowed two whips (one senior and one junior), and parties with 45 or more members are entitled to three whips (one senior and two junior).

Whips act in an administrative role, making sure members of their party are in the debating chamber when required and organising members of their party to speak during debates. Since the introduction of proportional representation in 1996, divisions that require all members in the chamber to vote by taking sides (termed a personal vote) are rarely used, except for conscience votes. Instead, one of the party's whips votes on behalf of all the members of their party, by declaring how many members are in favour and/or how many members are opposed. They also cast proxy votes for single-member parties whose member is not in the chamber at the time of the vote, and also cast proxy votes during personal votes for absent members of their parties and for absent members of associated single-member parties.

=== United Kingdom ===
In British politics, the chief whip of the governing party in the House of Commons is customarily appointed as Parliamentary Secretary to the Treasury so that the incumbent, who represents the whips in general, has a seat and a voice in the Cabinet. By virtue of holding the office of Parliamentary Secretary to the Treasury, the government chief whip has an official residence at 12 Downing Street, although the chief whip's office is currently located at 9 Downing Street. Government whips report to the prime minister on any possible backbench revolts and the general opinion of MPs within the party, and upon the exercise of patronage, which is used to motivate and reward loyalty.

The role of whips is largely to ensure that MPs vote as required by the party leadership, i.e. to secure the government's business, and to protect the prime minister. Whips use a combination of threats and promises to secure compliance. A former chief whip said that there was a dividing line between legitimate and illegitimate persuasion: "Yes to threats on preferment (for government positions) and honours. No to abusing public money, such as threatening to withhold money from projects in the MP's constituency, and private lives." Former chief whips disclosed that whips have a notebook documenting MPs' indiscretions, and that they help MPs in any sort of trouble ("it might be debt, it might be ... a scandal involving small boys ...") in any way they can to "store up brownie points ... that sounds a pretty, pretty nasty reason, but it's one of the reasons because if we could get a chap out of trouble then he will do as we ask forever more."

==== Having the whip withdrawn ====
Having the whip withdrawn means the MP is effectively expelled from their party. British parties do not have the power to expel an MP from parliament, but can force the MP to sit as an independent and remove them from ministerial office.

== In other countries ==
=== Italy ===
Most parliamentary groups in both the Chamber of Deputies and the Senate of the Republic appoint a Segretario (Secretary) or Segretario d'Aula (Floor Secretary), who enforces party discipline in the same way a whip does in English-speaking nations. The Minister for Parliamentary Relations also often acts like a whip, but works for the incumbent governing coalition as a whole rather than for a single specific party or parliamentary group.

=== Spain ===
In both houses of the Cortes Generales, the Spanish legislature, political parties appoint a member to the role of portavoz adjunto (deputy spokesperson), which is the third authority of the parliamentary group after the leader and the spokesperson. The deputy spokesperson enforces party discipline in every vote, being thus the equivalent of a party whip in English-speaking countries.

=== South Africa ===
Although South Africa uses a proportional representation system, the concept of a political party whip, which was inherited from colonial British rule, has been maintained.

In 2017, African National Congress secretary general Gwede Mantashe said "Voting according to conscience doesn't work in a political party system. We all get into the list of things and go to Parliament as parliamentarians of the ANC [...] There will be no voting against the ANC."

=== Taiwan ===
Party whips exist in most of the major parties of the Legislative Yuan. For example, in the Democratic Progressive Party the party whip is the Caucus leader. In the Kuomintang the party whip is the executive director of the Policy Committee or the caucus leader.

When voting for critical bills, whips may issue a top-mobilization order asking members to attend the assembly. Party members failing to obey the order are suspended or expelled from the party.

=== Turkey ===
In the Grand National Assembly of Turkey, political parties with at least 20 members are entitled to form a parliamentary group. The equivalent role of a party whip is officially termed as Grup başkanvekili (deputy group chairperson). Since party leaders (group chairpersons) are often occupied with general party administration or may not be members of parliament, deputy group chairpersons functionally run the daily legislative and administrative operations of the parliamentary groups.

Deputy group chairpersons are responsible for enforcing strict party discipline, ensuring member attendance during general assembly votes, and coordinating the legislative agenda with other political parties. They possess significant structural authority, including the power to determine committee assignments and to introduce parliamentary group motions to the general floor.

=== United States ===
In the United States there are legislatures at the local (city councils, town councils, county boards, etc.), state, and federal levels. The federal legislature (Congress), the legislatures in all states except for Nebraska (which officially has a nonpartisan unicameral legislature), and many county and city legislative bodies are divided along party lines and have whips, as well as majority and minority leaders. The whip is also the assistant majority or assistant minority leader.

Both houses of Congress, the House of Representatives and Senate, have majority and minority whips. They in turn have subordinate "regional" whips. While members of Congress often vote along party lines, the influence of the whip is weaker than in the UK system; American politicians have considerably more freedom to diverge from the party line and vote according to their conscience or their constituents' preferences. One reason is that a considerable amount of money is raised by individual candidates. Furthermore, nobody, including members of Congress, can be expelled from a political party, which is formed simply by open registration. Because preselection of candidates for office is generally done through a primary election open to a wide number of voters, candidates who support their constituents' positions rather than those of their party leaders cannot easily be rejected by their party, due to a democratic mandate.

Because, unlike members of a parliament, members of Congress cannot serve simultaneously in Executive Branch positions, a whip in the United States cannot bargain for votes by promising promotion or threatening demotion in a sitting administration. There is, however, a highly structured committee system in both houses of Congress, and a whip may be able to offer promotion or threaten demotion within that system. In the House of Representatives, the influence of a single member individually is relatively small and therefore depends a great deal on the representative's seniority (i.e., in most cases, on the length of time they have held office).

In the Senate, the majority whip is the third-highest ranking individual in the majority party (the party with the most seats). The majority whip is outranked by the majority leader and, unofficially, the president pro tempore of the Senate. As the office of president pro tempore is largely honorific and usually given to the longest-serving senator of the majority, the majority whip is in reality the second-ranking senator in the majority conference. Similarly, in the House, the majority whip is outranked by both the majority leader and the speaker. Unlike the Senate's presiding officer, the Speaker is the leader of his or her party's caucus in the House.

In both the House and the Senate, the minority whip is the second highest-ranking individual in the minority party (the party with the lesser number of legislators in a legislative body), outranked only by the minority leader.

The whip position was created in the House of Representatives in 1897 by Republican Speaker Thomas Reed, who appointed James A. Tawney as the first whip. The first Democratic whip, Oscar Wilder Underwood, was appointed in about 1900. In the Senate, the position was created in 1913 by John W. Kern, chair of the Democratic caucus, when he appointed J. Hamilton Lewis as the first whip, while Republicans later chose James Wadsworth as the party's first in 1915.

== In popular culture ==
Michael Dobbs, formerly Chief of Staff for British Conservative Prime Minister Margaret Thatcher, wrote a trilogy of books, centred around a fictional party whip named Francis Urquhart, which was dramatised and broadcast by the BBC between 1990 and 1995. The first book in the trilogy, titled House of Cards, was adapted into a television series of the same name, and the title was also used for subsequent series based on other countries' political systems. In House of Cards, Francis Urquhart is the chief whip for the UK Conservative Party and the trilogy charts his ambitious rise through his party's ranks until he becomes Prime Minister.

In the American remake of House of Cards, Frank Underwood is the House Majority Whip for the US Democratic Party. The series charts Underwood's ambitious rise through his party's ranks until he becomes president. The name Frank Underwood was chosen to have the same initials as the original trilogy's protagonist Francis Urquhart, and to reference Oscar Underwood, the first party whip for the US Democratic Party.

The song "Demolition Man" by The Police references party whips in the lyric "I'm a three-line whip, I'm the sort of thing they ban."

In an episode of the American TV show Seinfeld, the character Kramer answers a question about the whip's role by claiming that party leaders in Congress used to whip members of their party who did not vote as they were told to.
