= Number 12 =

Number 12 may refer to:

- 12 (number)
- Number 12: When Greed and Corruption Become the Norm, a documentary on corruption in African football
- "Number 12 Looks Just Like You", an episode of the American television anthology series The Twilight Zone.
- The Number Twelve Looks Like You, an American mathcore band formed in 2002
- London Buses route 12
- 12 Downing Street, building in London traditionally used as the office of the Chief Whip
- 12 Grimmauld Place, a fictional location in the Harry Potter universe
- No. 12 Squadron RAF
- Inside centre, also known as number 12, a position in rugby union
