= Murdo Maclean =

Scottish civil servant

Sir Murdo Maclean (born 1943) is a Scottish former civil servant and non-executive director.

Maclean worked at the Employment Exchange in Govan from 1963 to 1964, when he was appointed to the Board of Trade. Three years later he was seconded to the Prime Minister's Office (1967–1972) and the Department of Industry (1972–1978) where he worked on industrial and regional policy. Maclean then worked as principal private secretary to the government chief whip in 12 Downing Street from 1978 until he retired in 2000.

Maclean held this office during the administrations of prime ministers James Callaghan, Margaret Thatcher, John Major and Tony Blair, working with some nine government chief whips for some 22 years. In The Times, Jill Sherman called him "one of the most influential men in Whitehall", and elsewhere he has been described as "known to everyone who matters within [Whitehall] ... [he is] the 'usual channels' which keep Parliament running". Part of his role was to ensure that there was enough parliamentary time to pass the government's legislation; this entailed liaising with government ministers and opposition officials.

On leaving government service, Maclean held a number of non-executive and advisory roles, including five years (2007–12) with the US global engineering company, CH2M Hill, which successfully bid for the London 2012 Olympics, Crossrail and the Thames Tideway Tunnel project. Maclean was also chief executive of Tridos Solutions Ltd between 2000 and 2002 and was chairman of SiScape Technology Ltd from 2001 to 2002.

Maclean was knighted in the 2000 Birthday Honours for services to the Business of Parliament and is a Freeman of the City of London.

Other offices
Preceded by Sir Freddie Warren	Principal Private Secretary to the Chief Whip; 1978–2000	Succeeded by Sir Roy Stone
