= 11 Downing Street =

Official residence of Britain's Chancellor of the Exchequer

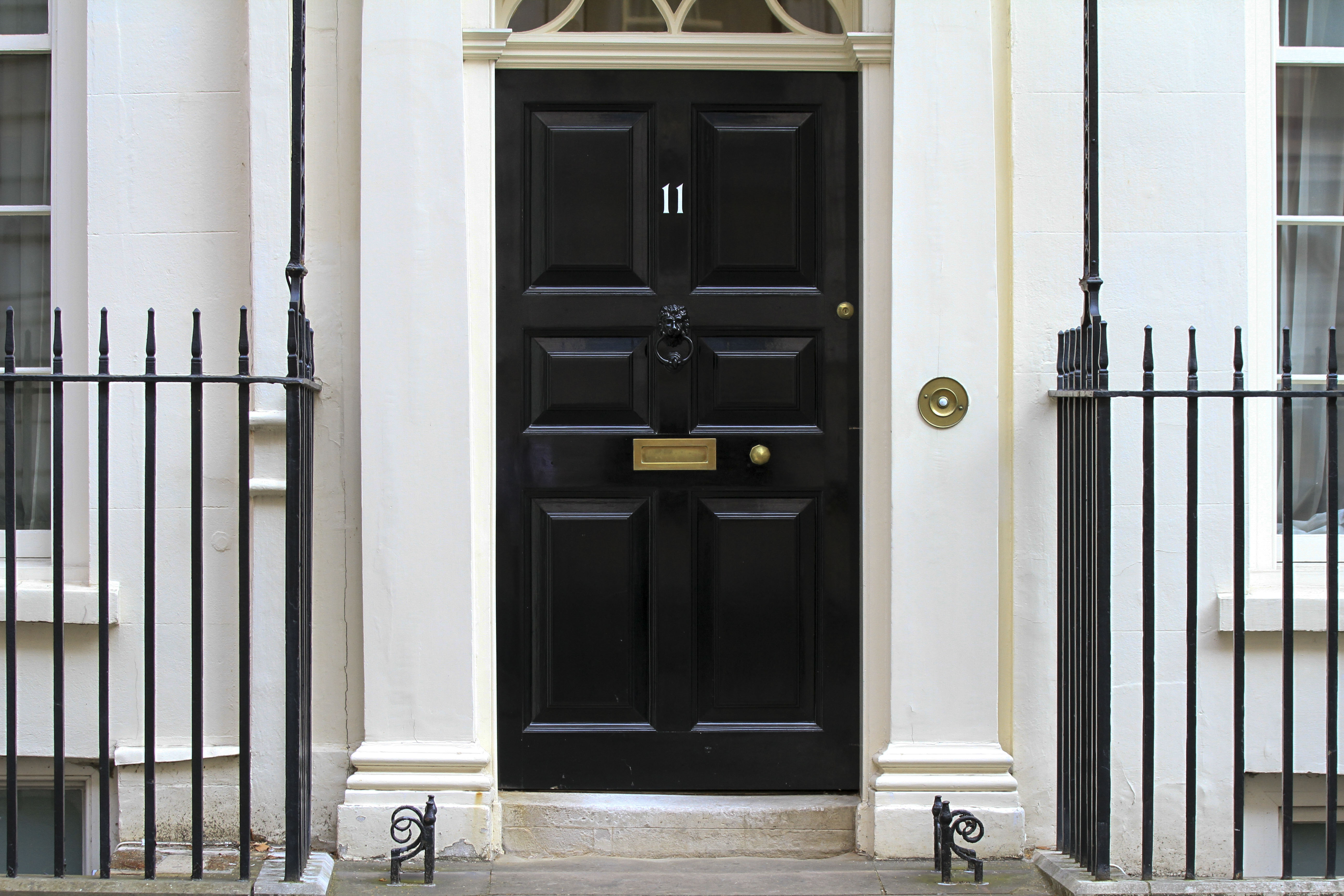

- Location within City of Westminster

General information
- Architectural style: Georgian
- Location: City of Westminster, London, SW1, United Kingdom
- Coordinates: 51.5034°N 0.1278°W
- Current tenants: John Healey (Chancellor of the Exchequer)
- Construction started: 1682; 344 years ago
- Completed: 1684; 342 years ago

Design and construction
- Architect: Christopher Wren

Website
- http://www.number10.gov.uk/

Listed Building – Grade I
- Reference no.: 1356989

11 Downing Street in London, also known colloquially in the United Kingdom as Number 11, is the official residence of the chancellor of the exchequer (who traditionally also has the title of Second Lord of the Treasury). The residence, in Downing Street in London, was built alongside the official residence of the Prime Minister at Number 10 in 1682.

The first chancellor to live there was Henry Petty-Fitzmaurice in 1806, but Number 11 did not become the chancellor's official residence until 1828.

From 1997 to 2022, prime ministers Tony Blair, Gordon Brown, David Cameron, Theresa May and Boris Johnson chose to reside for all or part of their term of office in the flat above Number 11, as its residential apartment is larger than at Number 10. Rishi Sunak broke with this by resuming residence in the smaller flat above Number 10. Keir Starmer, his wife Victoria, and their two children lived above Number 11.

== Background ==
Number 11 is part of a (blackened) yellow-brick Georgian-era converted mansion. The building overlooks St. James's Park and Horse Guards Parade and consists—from left to right—of Numbers 12, 11 and 10.

Number 11 is located on the left side of Number 10, the official residence of the Prime Minister (or First Lord of the Treasury) since the early 19th century. Number 12, to the left of Number 11, is the official residence of the Chief Whip, but it is now used as the Prime Minister's press office.

As a result of many internal alterations over the years, the three terraced houses are internally a single complex; one can walk from number 11 to number 10, via an internal connecting door, without using the street doors. The Cabinet Office on Whitehall is also directly connected to these at its rear making up an executive office of the prime minister and senior Privy Councillors.

The terraced house was one of several built by Sir George Downing between 1682 and 1684 to designs by Christopher Wren. It was altered c. 1723–35; refaced c. 1766–75 by Kenton Couse and with early C.19 alterations. Along with Number 10, it underwent a major reconstruction by Raymond Erith, 1960–64. Despite reconstruction, the interior retains a fine staircase with carved bracket tread ends and three slender turned balusters per tread. The fine Dining Room of 1825–26 is by Sir John Soane.

== Recent occupancy ==
When Tony Blair became prime minister in 1997 he chose to reside in Number 11, rather than Number 10, as it has a larger living area; Blair was living with his wife and their several young children, while Gordon Brown, the chancellor of the exchequer, was still a bachelor. In 2007, when Brown became prime minister, he at first chose to live in Number 11, but soon moved back to Number 10.

Following the 2010 general election, the incoming prime minister, David Cameron, moved into 11, and George Osborne chose to remain in his Notting Hill home. In early August 2011, Osborne moved into Number 10.

Boris Johnson lived in Number 11, instead of his first and second Chancellor (Sajid Javid and Rishi Sunak, respectively). In March 2020, Johnson refurbished the residential apartment at Number 11. An Electoral Commission inquiry investigated the financing of this refurbishment. This was known in the press as the Cash-for-Curtains scandal.

Rishi Sunak broke with this by resuming residence in the smaller flat above Number 10.
