= Downing Street Press Briefing Room =

Former news media room in 9 Downing Street for the government and its officials

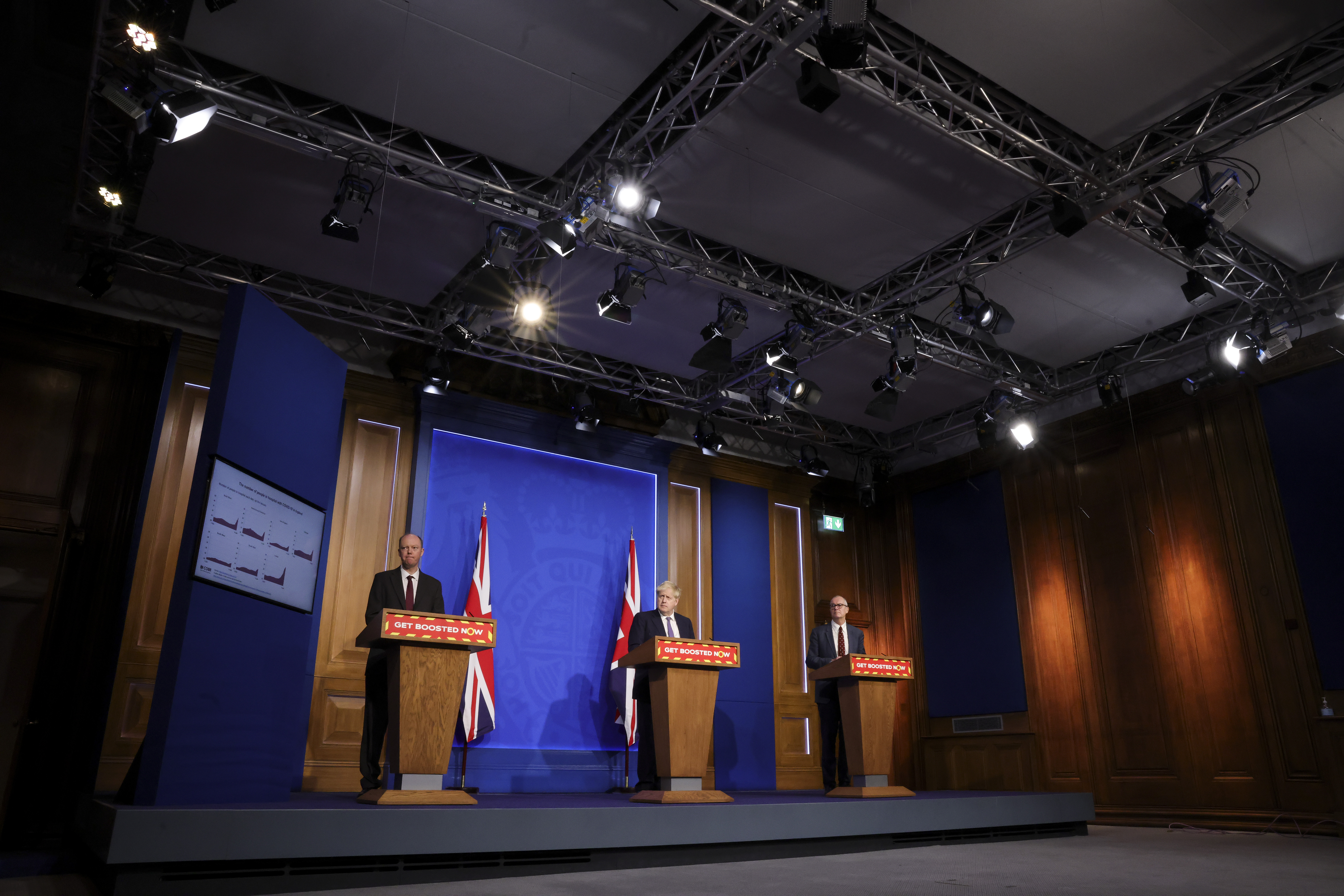
A COVID-19 press conference held during the pandemic in the Downing Street Briefing Room (January 2022)

The Downing Street Press Briefing Room is a room in 9 Downing Street, used by the prime minister of the United Kingdom and other senior government officials to hold press briefings and deliver ministerial broadcasts.

The room was constructed during the COVID-19 pandemic, and has been in use since 2021.

== History ==
The first Ministerial broadcast was made by Prime Minister Anthony Eden on 27 April 1956, and broadcast on the BBC. Since then, press conferences at Downing Street have been held in many different locations, including outside the door of No. 10, and during the Cameron-Clegg coalition, in the rose garden. The state dining room in No. 10 has also been used as a temporary press briefing room in times of bad weather.

=== Dedicated briefing room ===
During the COVID-19 pandemic, the government, often accompanied by Chief Medical Officers and the Chief Scientific Adviser, began holding daily press briefings to inform the public of new guidelines and statistics, and to allow the media to ask questions. As a result of this new frequency, the government under Boris Johnson converted a room in 9 Downing Street into a permanent media room in order to hold "White House-style" televised media briefings.

The total cost of the refit was over £2.6 million, with the main workings of the room costing £1.8 million, up to £200,000 of long lead items, and £30,000 of broadband equipment. The spending received widespread criticism from across the house, including from within the Conservative party, with Labour questioning the resource allocation during severe NHS pressure, and the Liberal Democrats branding it a "vanity project" for Johnson.

Russian-owned firm Megahertz, having previously performed work for state-controlled Russian broadcasters, installed computers, cameras, microphones, and a control desk. Despite assurances from the government about security measures, the involvement of Megahertz raised concerns among MPs and industry sources about the appropriateness and transparency of the contract award process. Labour and the chair of parliament’s cross-party group on Russia called for more transparency regarding the refurbishment.

The first press conference held in the new briefing room was held by Boris Johnson on 29 March 2021, after construction delays pushed back the opening from the expected window of autumn 2020. Both Liz Truss and Rishi Sunak also used the room for briefings.

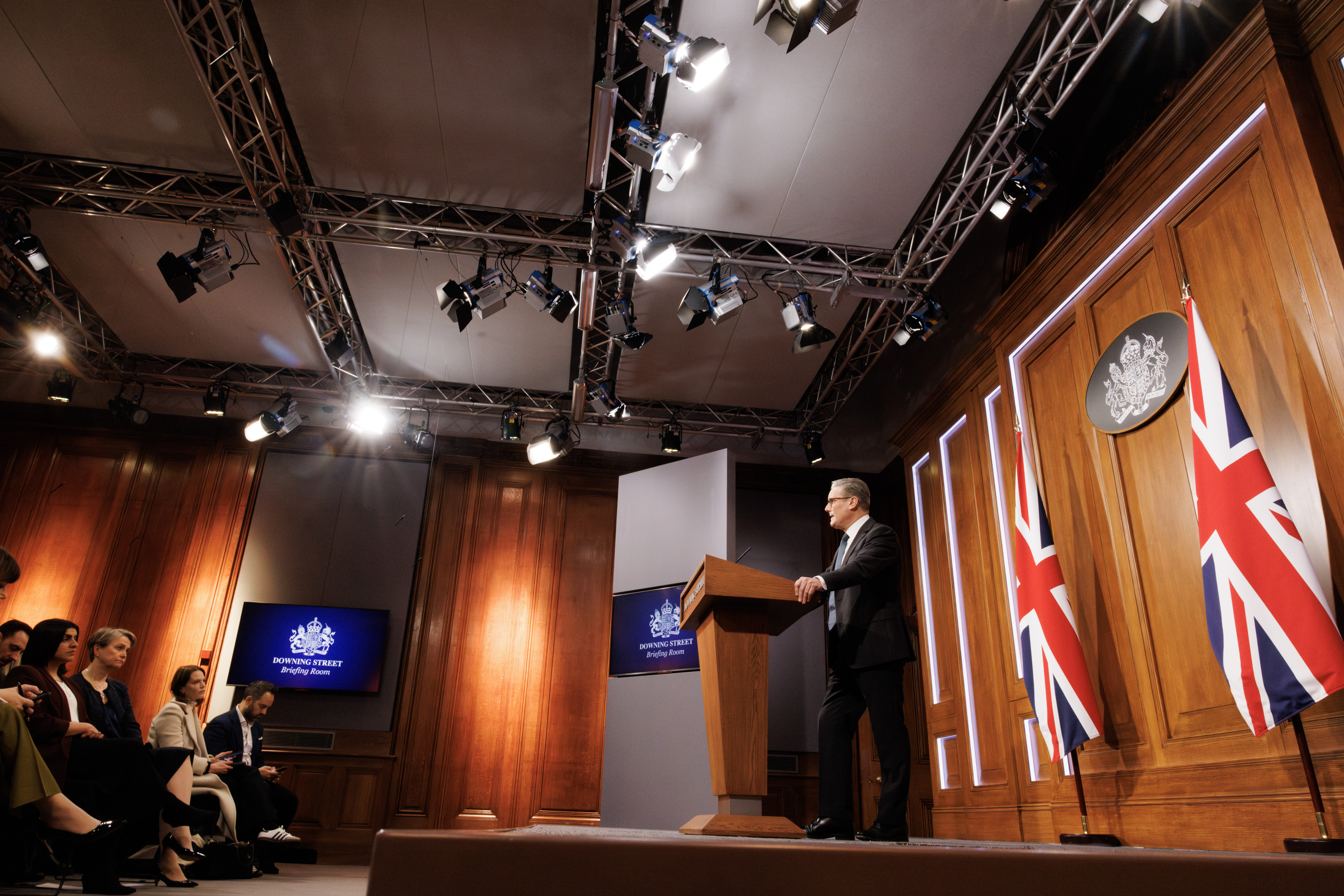
Prime Minister Keir Starmer, in January 2025, holds a press conference in the Press Briefing Room, after its renovation

After the 2024 general election, Labour prime minister Keir Starmer reverted to using the state dining room, with the briefing room reported as undergoing refurbishment from August 2024. In January 2025 a new 'politically neutral' look was revealed, with the traditionally Conservative-associated blue removed, replaced by more wooden panels and a new grey carpet. The works are reported to have cost up to £80,000.
