= Roy Stone (civil servant) =

British civil servant (1961–2025)

Sir Roy Stone CBE

Principal Private Secretary to the Government Chief Whip
- In office 30 November 2000 – 18 June 2021
- Prime Minister: Margaret Thatcher; John Major; Tony Blair; Gordon Brown; David Cameron; Theresa May; Boris Johnson
- Preceded by: Sir Murdo Maclean

Personal details
- Born: 19 June 1961 Hornchurch, Essex, England
- Died: 12 May 2025 (aged 63)

Sir Roy Alexander Stone CBE (19 June 1961 – 12 May 2025) was a British civil servant. From 2000 until 2021, he was Principal Private Secretary to the Government Chief Whip.

== Early life and career ==
Born in Hornchurch, Essex, England on 19 June 1961, Stone joined HM Civil Service in 1977 to work in project management in the Ministry of Defence (MoD). In 1983, he moved to the MoD Procurement Executive. In 1988, he joined the staff at 10 Downing Street as a duty clerk, then working as a parliamentary clerk from 1989 to 1998.

In 1998, he joined the office of the Government Chief Whip and worked as deputy to the Principal Private Secretary, Murdo Maclean. Stone succeeded Maclean on the latter's retirement in 2000 and held the office until 2021. Part of his role was to ensure that there was enough parliamentary time to pass the government's legislation; this entailed liaising with government ministers and opposition officials.

== Death ==
Stone died from a cardiac arrest on 12 May 2025, at the age of 63. Tributes were paid to him in the House of Commons the following day.

== Honours ==
Stone was appointed a Commander of the Order of the British Empire "for parliamentary and public service" in the 2014 New Year Honours, and a Knight Bachelor in the 2019 New Year Honours. In justifying his knighthood, the Cabinet Office stated that Stone "is an outstanding senior civil servant... responsible for the effective operation of the House of Commons Business Management team ... he has given unstinting service to twelve Chief Whips, and has played a vital role in delivering the Government's legislative priorities over this period".

Other offices
Preceded by Sir Murdo Maclean	Principal Private Secretary to the Chief Whip; 2000–2021	Succeeded by TBC
