= Government of the United Kingdom =

His Majesty's Government
- Central government
- Logo

Overview
- Established: 1 May 1707; 319 years ago
- Ministries: 24 ministerial departments; 20 non-ministerial departments
- Annual budget: £1.416 trillion (2025–2026)

The government of the United Kingdom, formally His Majesty's Government (Note: or Her Majesty's Government when a queen reigns. Abbreviated to HM Government, or simply HMG.) and also officially the UK Government, is the central executive authority of the United Kingdom of Great Britain and Northern Ireland. The government is led by the prime minister (Andy Burnham since 20 July 2026) who advises the monarch on the appointment of all the other ministers. The government is currently formed by the Labour party, which has had a majority in the House of Commons since 2024. The prime minister and his most senior ministers belong to the supreme decision-making committee, known as the Cabinet.

Ministers of the Crown are responsible to the House in which they sit; they make statements in that House and take questions from members of that House. For most senior ministers this is usually the elected House of Commons rather than the House of Lords. The government is dependent on Parliament to make primary legislation, and general elections are held at least once every five years to elect a new House of Commons, unless the prime minister advises the monarch to dissolve Parliament, in which case an election may be held sooner. After an election, the monarch selects as prime minister the leader of the party most likely to command the confidence of the House of Commons, usually by possessing a majority of MPs.

Under the uncodified British constitution, executive authority lies with the sovereign, although this authority is exercised only after receiving the advice of the Privy Council. In most cases the cabinet exercise power directly as leaders of the government departments, though some Cabinet positions are sinecures to a greater or lesser degree (for instance Chancellor of the Duchy of Lancaster or Lord Privy Seal).

The government is sometimes referred to by the metonym "Westminster" or "Whitehall", as many of its offices are situated there. These metonyms are used especially by the devolved executives, the Scottish Government, Welsh Government and Northern Ireland Executive, as well as English strategic authority mayoralties to differentiate themselves from His Majesty's Government (HMG).

== History ==
The United Kingdom is a constitutional monarchy in which the reigning monarch (that is, the king or queen who is the head of state at any given time) does not make any open political decisions. All political decisions are taken by the government and Parliament. This constitutional state of affairs is the result of a long history of constraining and reducing the political power of the monarch, beginning with Magna Carta in 1215.

Since the start of Edward VII's reign in 1901, by convention, the prime minister has been an elected member of Parliament (MP) and thus answerable to the House of Commons, although there were two weeks in 1963 when Alec Douglas-Home was first a member of the House of Lords and then of neither house. A similar convention applies to the position of chancellor of the exchequer. The last chancellor of the exchequer to be a member of the House of Lords was Lord Denman, who served for one month in 1834.

== Powers ==
=== Royal Prerogative ===
The British monarch is the head of state and the sovereign, but not the head of government. In practice, the monarch conventionally takes little direct part in governing the country and remains neutral in political affairs. However, the authority of the state that is vested in the sovereign, known as the Crown, remains the source of executive power exercised by the government.

In addition to explicit statutory authority, the Crown also possesses a body of powers in certain matters collectively known as the royal prerogative. These powers range from the authority to issue or withdraw passports to declarations of war. By long-standing convention, most of these powers are delegated from the sovereign to various ministers or other officers of the Crown, who may use them without having to obtain the consent of Parliament.

The prime minister also has weekly meetings with the monarch. What is said in these meetings is strictly private; however, they generally involve government and political matters which the monarch has a "right and a duty" to comment on. Such comments are non-binding however and the King must (by convention, though not by strict law) ultimately abide by decisions of the government.

Royal prerogative powers include, but are not limited to, the following:

=== Domestic powers ===
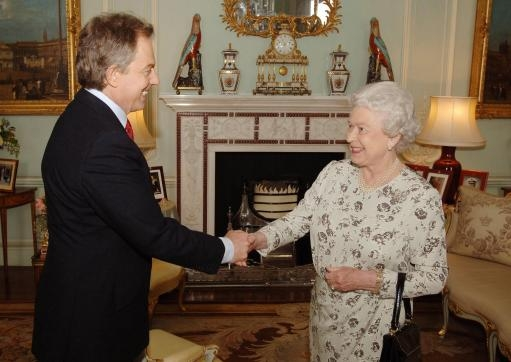
Queen Elizabeth II receiving Prime Minister Tony Blair after he won a third term in office on 6 May 2005

- The power to appoint and dismiss a prime minister. This power is exercised by the monarch personally. However, the last time the monarch used their own discretion when exercising this power was 1834, with the modern convention that they appoint (and are expected to appoint) the individual most likely to be capable of commanding a majority in the House of Commons.
- The power to appoint and dismiss other ministers. This power is exercised by the monarch on the advice of the prime minister.
- The power to assent to and enact laws by giving royal assent to bills passed by Parliament, which is required for a law to become effective (an act). This is exercised by the monarch, who also theoretically has the power to refuse assent, although no monarch has refused assent to a bill passed by Parliament since Queen Anne in 1708.
- The power to give and to issue commissions to commissioned officers in the Armed Forces.
- The power to command the Armed Forces. This power is exercised by the Defence Council in the King's name.
- The power to appoint members to the Privy Council.
- The power to issue, suspend, cancel, recall, impound, withdraw, or revoke British passports and the general power to provide or deny British passport facilities to British citizens and British nationals. This is exercised in the United Kingdom (but not necessarily in the Isle of Man, Channel Islands or British Overseas Territories) by the home secretary.
- The power to pardon any conviction (the royal prerogative of mercy).
- The power to grant, cancel and annul any honours.
- The power to create corporations (including the status of being a city, with its corporation) by royal charter, and to amend, replace and revoke existing charters.

=== Foreign powers ===
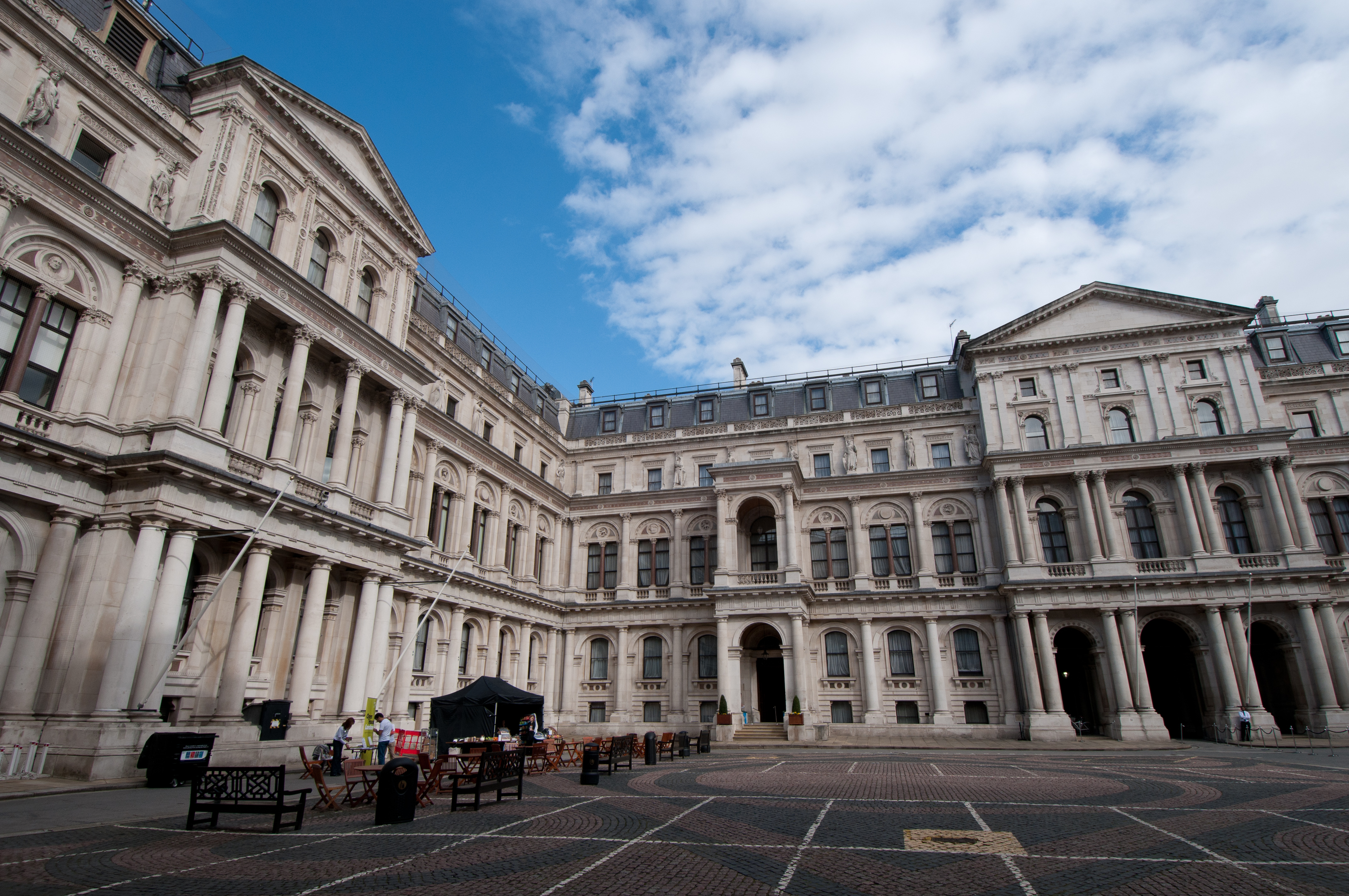
The Foreign, Commonwealth and Development Office, Whitehall

- The power to make and ratify treaties.
- The power to declare war and conclude peace with other nations.
- The power to deploy the Armed Forces overseas.
- The power to recognise states.
- The credit power and receive diplomats.

While no formal documents set out the prerogatives, the government published the above list in October 2003 to increase transparency, as some of the powers exercised in the name of the monarch are part of the royal prerogative. However, the complete extent of the royal prerogative powers has never been fully set out, as many of them originated in ancient custom and the period of absolute monarchy, or were modified by later constitutional practice.

== Ministers and departments ==
As of 2019, there are around 120 government ministers supported by 560,000 civil servants and other staff working in the 24 ministerial departments and their executive agencies. There are also an additional 20 non-ministerial departments with a range of further responsibilities.

In theory, a government minister does not have to be a member of either House of Parliament. In practice, however, the convention is that ministers must be members of either the House of Commons or the House of Lords to be accountable to Parliament. From time to time, prime ministers appoint non-parliamentarians as ministers. In recent years such ministers have been appointed to the House of Lords.

== Government in Parliament ==
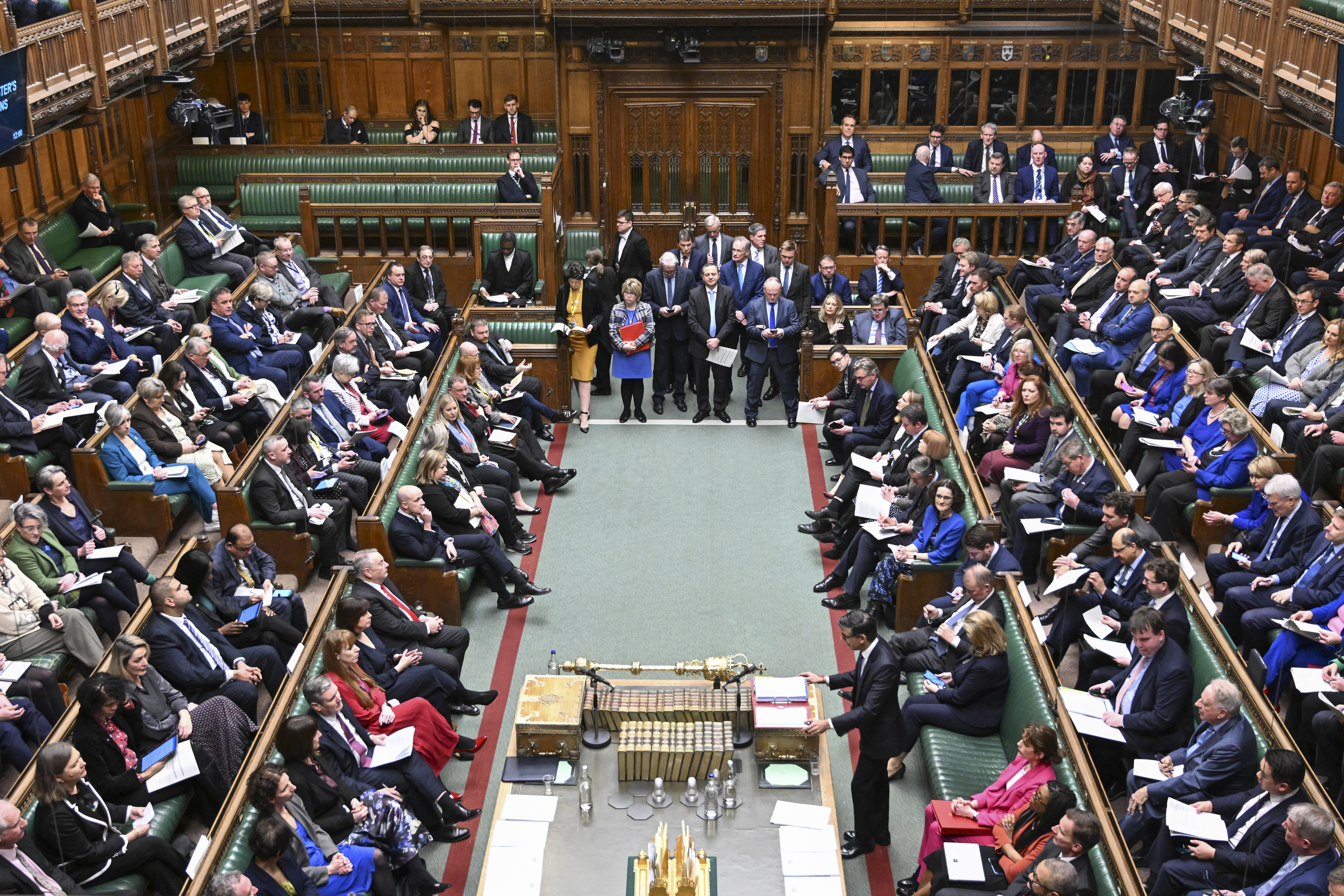
Prime Minister's Questions, 2024

The government is required by convention and for practical reasons to maintain the confidence of the House of Commons. It requires the support of the House of Commons for the maintenance of supply (by voting through the government's budgets) and to pass primary legislation. By convention, if a government loses the confidence of the House of Commons it must either resign or a general election is held. The support of the lords, while useful to the government in getting its legislation passed without delay, is not vital. A government is not required to resign even if it loses the confidence of the lords and is defeated in key votes in that House. The House of Commons is thus the responsible house.

The prime minister is held to account during Prime Minister's Questions (PMQs) which provides an opportunity for MPs from all parties to question the PM on any subject. There are also departmental questions when ministers answer questions relating to their specific departmental brief. Unlike PMQs, both the cabinet ministers for the department and junior ministers within the department may answer on behalf of the government, depending on the topic of the question.

During debates on legislation proposed by the government, ministers—usually with departmental responsibility for the bill—will lead the debate for the government and respond to points made by MPs or Lords.

Committees of both the House of Commons and House of Lords hold the government to account, scrutinise its work and examine in detail proposals for legislation. Ministers appear before committees to give evidence and answer questions.

Government ministers are also required by convention and the Ministerial Code, when Parliament is sitting, to make major statements regarding government policy or issues of national importance to Parliament. This allows MPs or Lords to question the government on the statement. When the government instead chooses to make announcements first outside Parliament, it is often the subject of significant criticism from MPs and the speaker of the House of Commons.

== Location ==
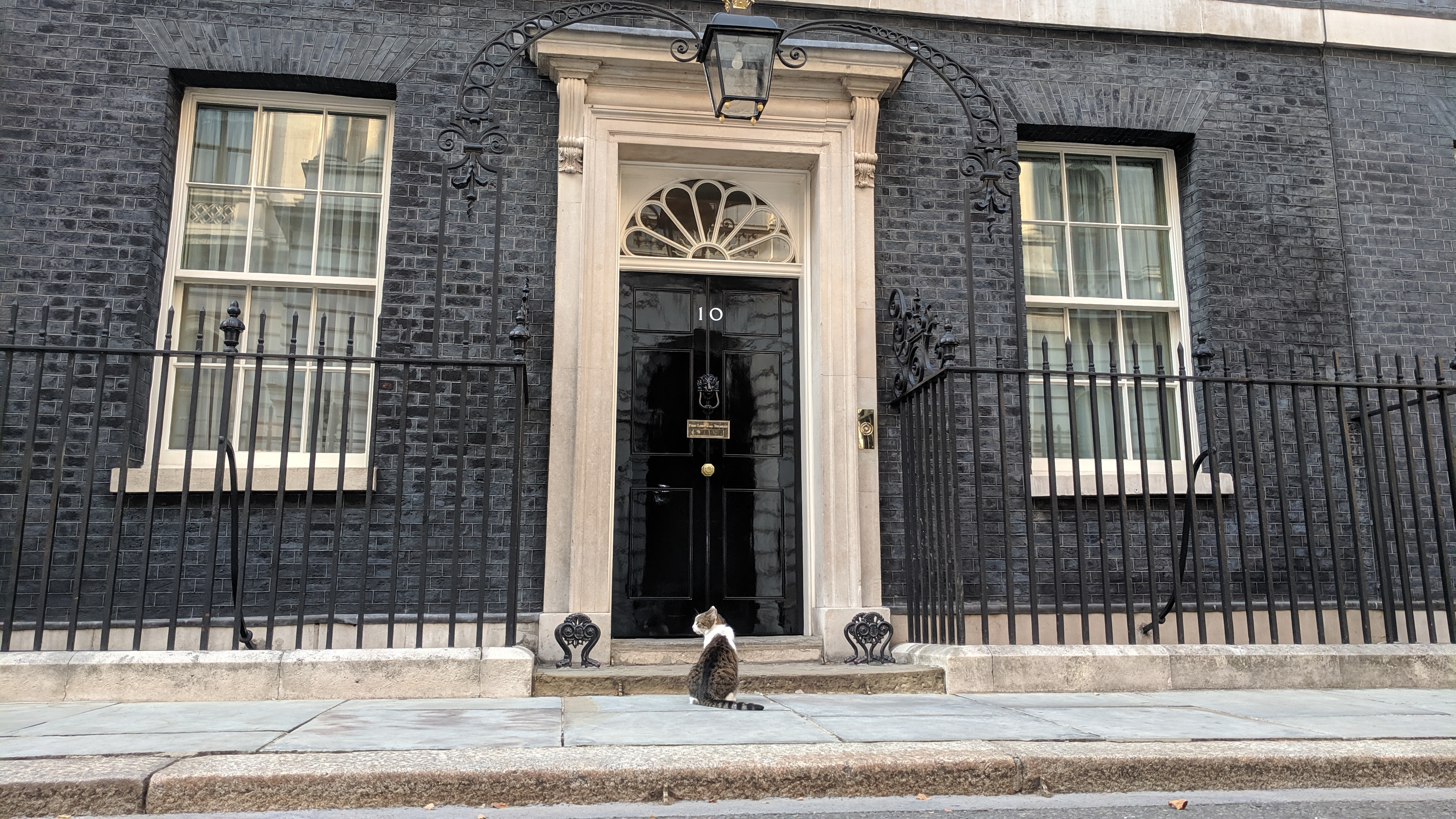
The main entrance of 10 Downing Street, the official residence and office of the First Lord of the Treasury, who is by custom nowadays also the Prime Minister. Also seen is Larry the Cat, the Chief Mouser to the Cabinet Office.

The prime minister is based at 10 Downing Street in Westminster, London. Cabinet meetings also take place here. Most government departments have their headquarters nearby in Whitehall.

== Limits of government power ==
The government's powers include general executive and statutory powers, delegated legislation, and numerous powers of appointment and patronage. However, some powerful officials and bodies, (e.g. HM judges, local authorities, and the charity commissions) are legally more or less independent of the government, and government powers are legally limited to those retained by the Crown under common law or granted and limited by act of Parliament. Both substantive and procedural limitations are enforceable in the courts by judicial review.

Nevertheless, magistrates and mayors can still be arrested and put on trial for corruption, and the government has powers to insert commissioners into a local authority to oversee its work, and to issue directives that must be obeyed by the local authority if the local authority is not abiding by its statutory obligations.

By contrast, as in European Union (EU) member states, EU officials cannot be prosecuted for any actions carried out in pursuit of their official duties, and foreign country diplomats (though not their employees) and foreign members of the European Parliament are immune from prosecution in EU states under any circumstance. As a consequence, neither EU bodies nor diplomats have to pay taxes, since it would not be possible to prosecute them for tax evasion. When the UK was a member of the EU, this caused a dispute when the US ambassador to the UK claimed that London's congestion charge was a tax, and not a charge (despite the name), and therefore he did not have to pay it—a claim the Greater London Authority disputed.

Similarly, the monarch is immune from criminal prosecution and may only be sued with his permission (this is known as sovereign immunity). The sovereign, by law, is not required to pay income tax, but Queen Elizabeth II voluntarily paid it from 1993 until the end of her reign in 2022, and also paid local rates voluntarily. However, the monarchy also received a substantial grant from the government, the Sovereign Support Grant, and Queen Elizabeth II's inheritance from her mother, Queen Elizabeth The Queen Mother, was exempt from inheritance tax.

In addition to legislative powers, His Majesty's Government has substantial influence over local authorities and other bodies set up by it, through financial powers and grants. Many functions carried out by local authorities, such as paying out housing benefits and council tax benefits, are funded or substantially part-funded by the central government.

Neither the central government nor local authorities are permitted to sue anyone for defamation. Individual politicians are allowed to sue people for defamation in a personal capacity and without using government funds, but this is relatively rare (although George Galloway, who was a backbench MP for a quarter of a century, has sued or threatened to sue for defamation several times). However, it is a criminal offence to make a false statement about any election candidate during an election, to reduce the number of votes they receive (as with libel, opinions do not count).

== Terminology ==
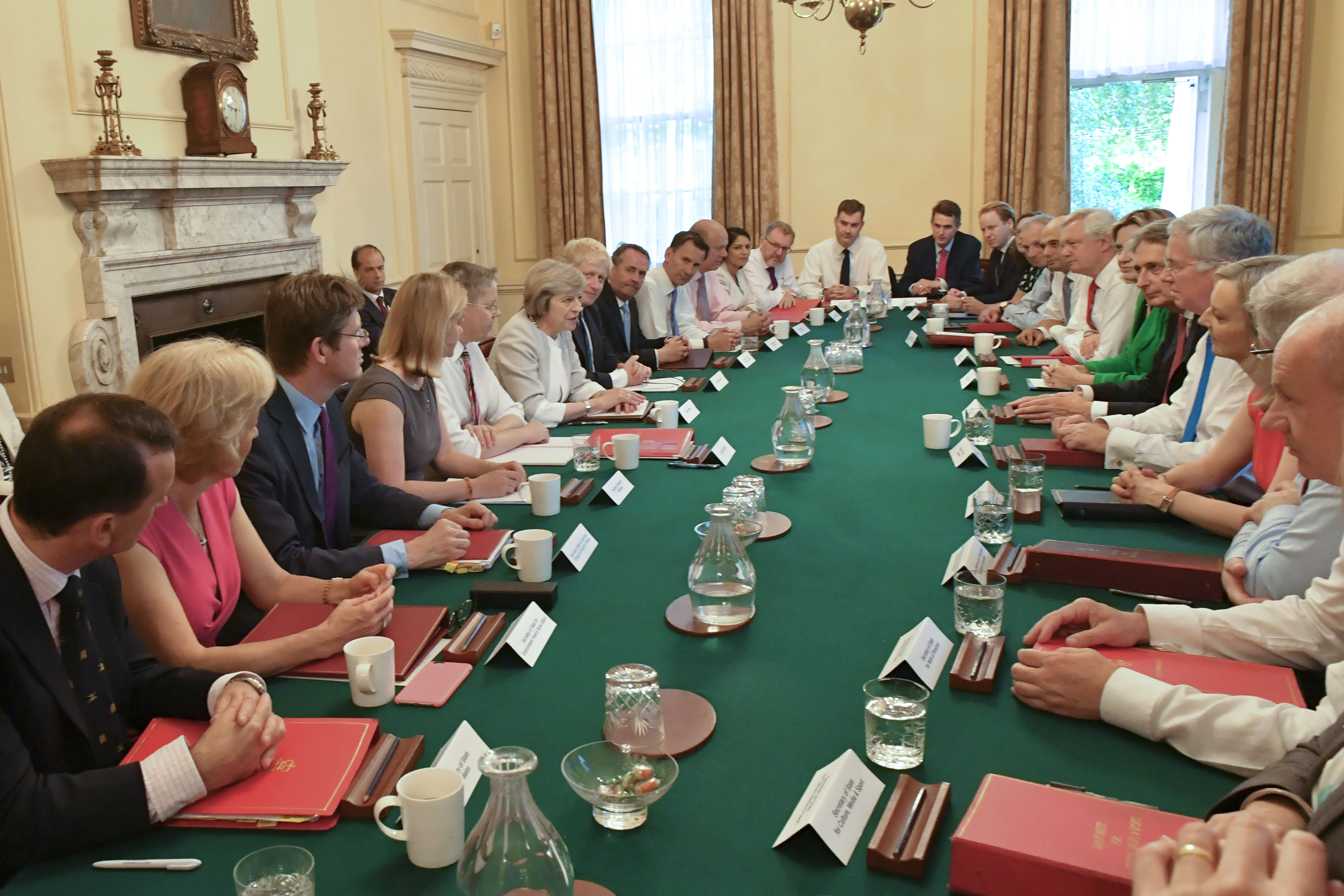
A meeting of the cabinet in the Cabinet Room, 10 Downing Street

While the government is the current group of ministers (the British Government frontbench), the government is also sometimes seen more broadly as including people or organisations that work for the ministers. The civil service, while 'independent of government', is sometimes described as being part of the government, due to the closeness of its working with ministers, in advising them, supporting them, and implementing their executive decisions. Some individuals who work for ministers even have the word 'Government' in their titles, such as the Government Actuary and the Government Chief Scientific Adviser, as do civil service organisations such as the Government Statistical Service, the Government Legal Profession, and the Government Office for Science. Companies owned by the government can also be seen as parts of the government, such as UK Government Investments and HS2 Ltd.

Similarly, Parliamentary Private Secretaries are not ministers and so not part of the government. However, they are bound by parts of the ministerial code, are part of the payroll vote, and can be seen as being on the 'first rung of the ministerial ladder'. They are sometimes described as being part of the government.

== Symbols ==
Lesser arms used since 2024

The UK Government uses a simplified form of the Royal Arms as a logo called the lesser arms. It typically omits the helm and mantling, reduces the crest to the crown alone, and has no compartment. Although the blazon of the arms has not changed since 1837, a new depiction of the Royal Arms is created for each new reign.

Use of the Royal Arms by government departments and agencies is governed by the Cabinet Office. The Royal Arms feature on all Acts of Parliament, in the logos of government departments, on the cover of all UK passports (and passports issued in other British territories and dependencies), as an inescutcheon on the diplomatic flags of British Ambassadors, and on The London Gazette. It is also used in the British Overseas Territories, namely on all acts of the Anguilla House of Assembly and by the administrations of Akrotiri and Dhekelia, the Pitcairn Islands, and South Georgia and the South Sandwich Islands.

Some departments use a different symbol as their logo for historic reasons, including the Scotland Office, Home Office, Ministry of Defence, UK Export Finance, and the Wales Office.

== Devolved governments ==
Since 1999, certain areas of central government have been devolved to accountable governments in Scotland, Wales and Northern Ireland. These are not part of His Majesty's Government, and are directly accountable to their institutions, with their authority under the Crown; in contrast, there is no devolved national government for England, although certain powers of central government are devolved to the Greater London Authority and combined authorities.

== Local government ==
Up to three layers of elected local authorities (such as county, district and parish Councils) exist throughout all parts of the United Kingdom, in some places merged into unitary authorities. They have limited local tax-raising powers. Many other authorities and agencies also have statutory powers, generally subject to some central government supervision.

== See also ==
- Constitutional reform in the United Kingdom
- Departments of the Government of the United Kingdom
- Disestablishmentarianism
- Supreme Court of the United Kingdom
- Gov.uk
- Government spending in the United Kingdom
- British Government frontbench
- His Majesty's Most Loyal Opposition
- List of British governments
- Northern Ireland Executive
- Office for Veterans' Affairs
- Scottish Government
- Welsh Government
- Whole of Government Accounts
