= Chief Whip =

Government position

The Chief Whip is a political leader whose task is to enforce the whipping system, which aims to ensure that legislators who are members of a political party attend and vote on legislation as the party leadership prescribes.

== United Kingdom ==
In British politics, the Chief Whip of the governing party in the House of Commons is usually also appointed as Parliamentary Secretary to the Treasury, a Cabinet position. The Government Chief Whip has an official residence at 12 Downing Street; however, their offices are located at 9 Downing Street.

The Chief Whip can wield significant power over their party's MPs, including cabinet ministers, being seen to speak on behalf of the Prime Minister. During Margaret Thatcher's second term, her Chief Whip John Wakeham became an important party manager and political fixer, advising her on the parliamentary party and helping to manage relations with ministers and Conservative MPs.

The role of the Chief Whip is regarded as secretive, as the Whip is concerned with the discipline of their own party's Members of Parliament, never appearing on television or radio in their capacity as whip. An exception occurred on 1 April 2019 when Julian Smith chose to criticise his own government and Prime Minister. Whips in the House of Commons do not, by convention, speak in debates.

The Government Chief Whip is assisted by the Deputy Chief Whip, other whips, and assistant whips. In order to provide the whip with a salary, the government whips are appointed to positions in HM Treasury and in the Royal Household under the Lord Steward of the Household. The whips are not fully active in either of these departments, though they do undertake a number of responsibilities. The Deputy Chief Whip is Treasurer of HM Household, the next two whips are Comptroller of HM Household and Vice-Chamberlain of HM Household. The remaining whips are Lords Commissioners of the Treasury. Assistant whips, and whips of opposition parties, generally do not receive such appointments.

The Government Chief Whip in the House of Lords also holds the role of Captain of the Honourable Corps of Gentlemen-at-Arms, while the Government Deputy Chief Whip in the Lords holds the role of Captain of the Yeomen of the Guard. Other whips, who are fewer in number due to the decreased importance of party discipline in the Lords, are appointed as Lords in Waiting, if men, and Baronesses in Waiting, if women. As well as their duties as whips, Lords whips speak in the chamber (unlike Commons whips) to support departmental ministers, or act as a spokesperson for government departments with no minister in the Lords.

Outside the government, the Official Opposition Chief Whip in the Commons, like the Leader of the Opposition, receives a stipend in addition to their parliamentary salary, because their additional responsibilities will make them unable to hold down another job.

The whips, although superficially dictatorial, act as communicators between backbenchers and the party leadership. Ultimately, if backbenchers are unhappy with the leadership's position, they can threaten to revolt during a vote and force the leadership to compromise.

While the whip was formally introduced to British politics by the Irish Parliamentary Party under Charles Stewart Parnell in the 1880s, in 1846 the Duke of Wellington advised the new Conservative Party leader Lord Stanley to ensure that his "whippers-in" were personally loyal. According to the Oxford English Dictionary, the use of the term "whippers-in" was first recorded in the parliamentary sense in the Annual Register of 1772.

=== The whip as a party line ===
In the UK House of Commons, the importance of a vote is indicated by underlining items on the "whip", which is the name of the letter the Chief Whip sends to all the MPs in their party at the start of the week. This letter informs them of the schedule for the days ahead and includes the sentence "Your attendance is absolutely essential" next to each debate in which there will be a vote. This sentence is underlined once, twice, or three times depending on the consequences that will be suffered if they do not turn up, hence the origin of the terms one-line whip, two-line whip and three-line whip. The actual vote they are to make is communicated to them in the chamber by hand signals during the division when the time comes (usually after the division bell has been rung). Neither these instructions, which are visible to everyone in the chamber, nor the "whip" letter at the start of the week, are recorded in Hansard, as they are considered a matter internal to the political party. Any explicit direction to an MP as to how they should vote would be a breach of parliamentary privilege.

The consequences of defying the party whip depend on the circumstances and are usually negotiated with the party whip in advance. The party whip's job is to ensure the outcome of the vote. The party in the majority can always win a vote if its members obey the whip. Where members cannot attend a vote (for example for medical reasons), their whip may pair them with a member from the opposing side (by agreement with the opposing whip) who will then be whipped to abstain, so that the first member's absence does not affect the vote.

If the party has a large Commons majority, it can make allowances for MPs who are away on important business, or whose political circumstances require them to take a particular issue very seriously. Theoretically at least, expulsion from the party is an automatic consequence of defying a three-line whip.

Other such offences include betraying party loyalties. An example of this during John Major's government was when nine Conservative MPs had the whip removed after voting against the government on its stance on the Maastricht Treaty, becoming known as Eurosceptics. In practice they remained Conservative MPs supporting the government on other issues. For example, Iain Duncan Smith is still a Conservative MP and in fact went on to become leader of the party. This was also the only time when MPs who were being whipped were cooperating with the opposite side's whips. Despite the whip, individuals are entitled to vote according to their own beliefs, particularly when there is a "free vote" on a matter of conscience. (Note: A recent example of this was the second reading of the Terminally Ill Adults (End of Life) Bill, which would partially legalise assisted dying.)

There are some cases in which the whip is removed because an issue is a matter of conscience. These include adoption, religion and equal opportunities. The impact of a whip being imposed on a matter of conscience can be damaging for a party leader. One such case was that of Iain Duncan Smith, who imposed a three-line whip against the adoption of children by unmarried couples which, at the time, meant gay couples could never adopt. Several Conservative MPs voted against the official party line, and Duncan Smith's authority was weakened.

Whips often employ a mixture of promises, cajoling and persuasion to force an unpopular vote. A whip should know major figures in an MP's local constituency party and the MP's agent. There have been cases where sick MPs were wheeled into the House from far afield to vote for the government on a crucial vote. Joe Ashton MP recalled a case from the latter days of James Callaghan's government:

I remember the famous case of Leslie Spriggs, the then-Member for St. Helens. We had a tied vote, and he was brought to the House in an ambulance having suffered a severe heart attack. The two Whips went out to look in the ambulance and there was Leslie Spriggs lying there as though he was dead. I believe that John Stradling Thomas said to Joe Harper, "How do we know that he is alive?" So, he leaned forward, turned the knob on the heart machine, the green light went around, and he said, "There, you've lost—it's 311." That is an absolutely true story. It is the sort of nonsense that used to happen. No one believes it, but it is true.

A minister who defies the whip is generally dismissed from their job immediately, if they have not already resigned, and returns to being a backbencher. Sometimes their votes in Parliament are called the "payroll vote", because they can be taken for granted. The consequences for a back-bencher can include the lack of future promotion to a government post, a reduction of party campaigning effort in their constituency during the next election, deselection by their local party activists, or, in extreme circumstances, "withdrawal of the whip" and expulsion from the party.

=== Lists of chief whips by party ===
- House of Commons:
  - Parliamentary Secretary to the Treasury (Government Chief Whip)
  - Conservative Chief Whip
  - Labour Chief Whip
  - Liberal Democrats Chief Whip
  - For a list of former Government Chief Whips, see Parliamentary Secretary to the Treasury
  - Reform UK: Lee Anderson
  - Scottish National Party: Kirsty Blackman
  - Democratic Unionist Party: Sammy Wilson
  - Green Party: Siân Berry
- In devolved legislatures:
  - Plaid Cymru and Welsh Government: Heledd Fychan (Senedd)
  - Sinn Féin: Sinéad Ennis (Northern Ireland Assembly)
  - Social Democratic and Labour Party: Colin McGrath (Northern Ireland Assembly)
  - Ulster Unionist Party: Andy Allen (Northern Ireland Assembly; resigned July 2025)

=== Principal Private Secretary to the Chief Whip ===
The Government Chief Whip's office is headed by a Principal Private Secretary, who also acts as a go-between for ministers and the opposition to keep parliamentary business moving. The first officeholder, Charles Harris, was appointed privately in 1919 to assist Lord Edmund Talbot, the Conservative chief whip. He was retained by successive Conservative chief whips on a private basis, serving as their secretary during periods when the party was in government (1922–23, 1924–29 and 1935 onwards) until 1939, when the post formally became part of the civil service (as Assistant to the Parliamentary Secretary to the Treasury) and Harris was appointed into it, with a salary of £850. He retired in 1961 and was succeeded by Freddie Warren; all subsequent appointees have been permanent civil servants.

- 1939–1961: Sir Charles Harris, KBE
- 1961–1978: Sir Freddie Warren, CBE
- 1978–2000: Sir Murdo Maclean
- 2000–2021: Sir Roy Stone, CBE
- 2021–2026: Ayeesha Bhutta

== India ==
In India, the concept of the whip was inherited from colonial British rule. Every major political party appoints a whip who is responsible for the party's discipline and behaviour on the floor of the house. Usually, that person directs the party members to stick to the party's stand on certain issues and directs them to vote as per the direction of senior party members. However, there are some cases, such as the Indian presidential election, where no whip can be issued to direct Member of Parliament or Member of the Legislative Assembly on whom to vote.

== In other countries ==
There are also Chief Whips or similar positions in:

- Argentina – Jefe de Bancada (Argentina)
- Australia – party whip (Australia)
- Bangladesh – Chief Whip of the Jatiya Sangsad
- Canada – Chief Government Whip
- Czech Republic
- Ghana
- Ireland – Minister of State at the Department of the Taoiseach
- India – See above
- Malaysia – Chief Whip
- Namibia
- New Zealand
- Pakistan
- Scotland – Minister for Parliamentary Business
- Sri Lanka – Chief Government Whip
- South Africa – Chief Whip of the Majority Party
- Trinidad and Tobago
- Turkey – Deputy Chair of the Parliamentary Group
- Uganda
- United States – several equivalent positions: House Majority and Minority Whips and the Senate Majority and Minority Whips
- Wales – Chief Whip

== In fiction ==
British Chief Whips have appeared in TV series such as House of Cards, Yes Minister, The New Statesman and The Thick of It.

== See also ==
- The Public Whip
