= Payroll vote =

The payroll vote is a term in the British parliamentary system for the group of Members of Parliament who concurrently hold positions in the executive government (eg, as ministers of the crown). It traditionally includes the Prime Minister, Ministers and Parliamentary Private Secretaries (PPSs), and typically would number between 100–150 MPs. Even though PPSs are unpaid, they are appointed, do support ministerial work in ministers' offices, and are widely regarded as being on the "first rung of the ministerial ladder". Other patronage positions (such as Trade Envoys, party roles or the Starmer government's Mission Champions) have sometimes been considered part of the wider payroll vote. In theory, a government minister does not have to be a member of either House of Parliament. In practice, the convention is that ministers are members of either the House of Commons or the House of Lords so that they are accountable to Parliament.

Under the principle of Cabinet collective responsibility, all ministers (even those not in the Cabinet) must publicly support the position of the Government. Any minister who wishes to vote against the Government in Parliament is obliged, at least by convention, to resign from her/his governmental office first. There is therefore a built-in bloc of reliable support for the Government on any given parliamentary vote in either house.

The size of this bloc is substantial and has been increasing over time, especially in the House of Commons, where most ministers sit. Immediately after the 2005 general election, for example, there were 89 ministers and 51 parliamentary private secretaries sitting in the Commons, accounting for 40% of Labour Members of Parliament.

However, the payroll vote is not always absolutely guaranteed to the Prime Minister. For example, in certain votes called in the House of Commons relating to Brexit during the week of 11 March 2019, certain cabinet MPs voted against the government position without being required to resign or even facing any public questioning from PM Theresa May. This loss of 'core' support weakened the authority of the government and its leader on that issue and more broadly.
