= 12 Downing Street =

Government building in London

Coordinates: 51°30′12.2″N 0°07′41.1″W

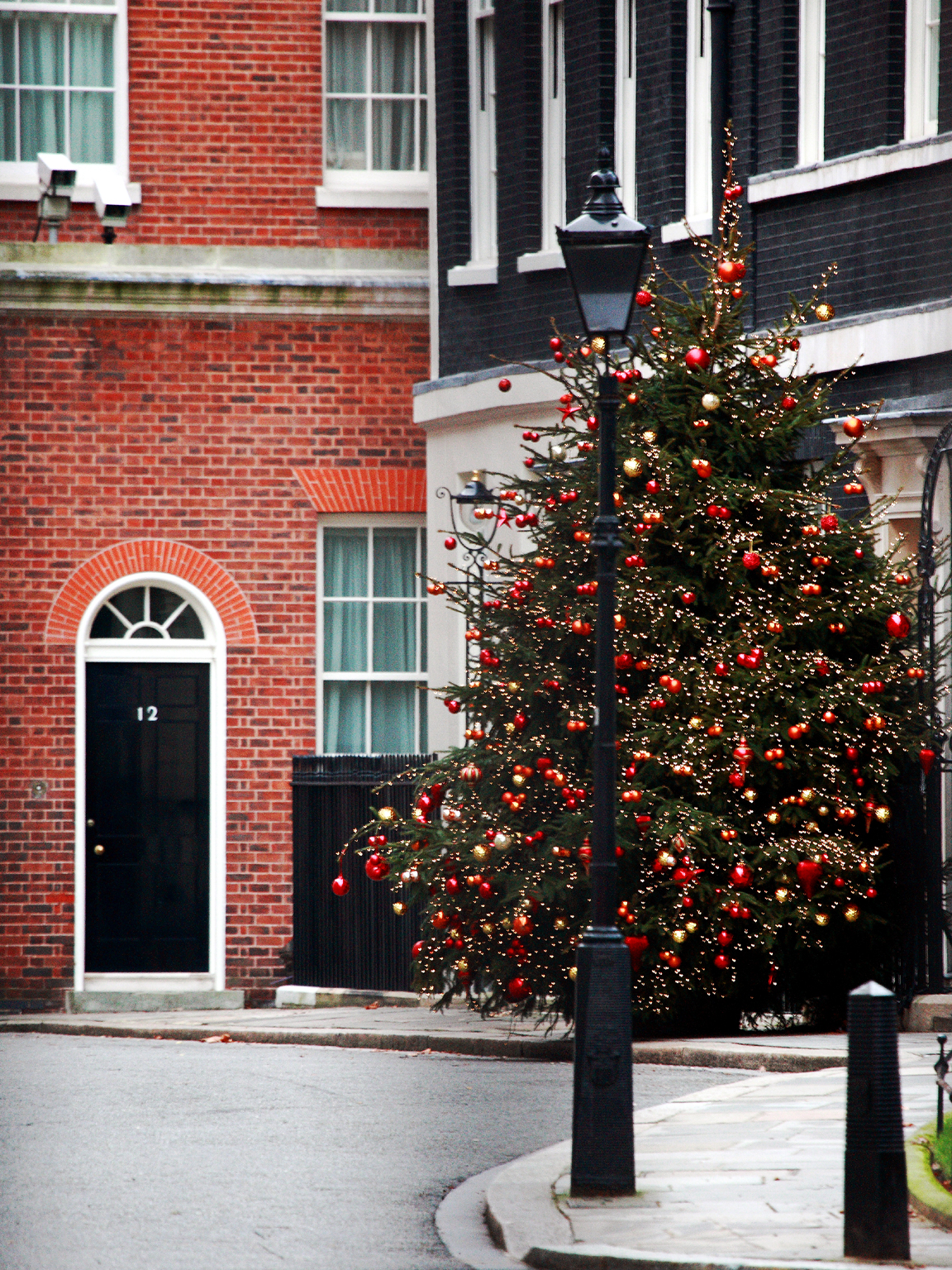
12 Downing Street in 2009

12 Downing Street is one of the buildings situated on Downing Street in the City of Westminster in London, England. It has been traditionally used as the office of the Chief Whip although the upper floor forms part of the residential apartment for the prime minister of the United Kingdom. It has been owned and used by the Crown since 1803, first housing the Judge Advocate General of the Armed Forces and then the Colonial Office, before the office of the Chief Whip moved into the premises in 1879 until 2001. It is a Grade II listed building.

== Current use ==
The offices of the Prime Minister in 10 Downing Street have spread into 12 Downing Street, connected by a corridor which runs through 11 Downing Street. Under the 2019–2024 government the building was used to house the Prime Minister's Press Office and Strategic Communications Unit. Although historically the house was used as the office of the Chief Whip, that is now located in 9 Downing Street.

== Historical use ==
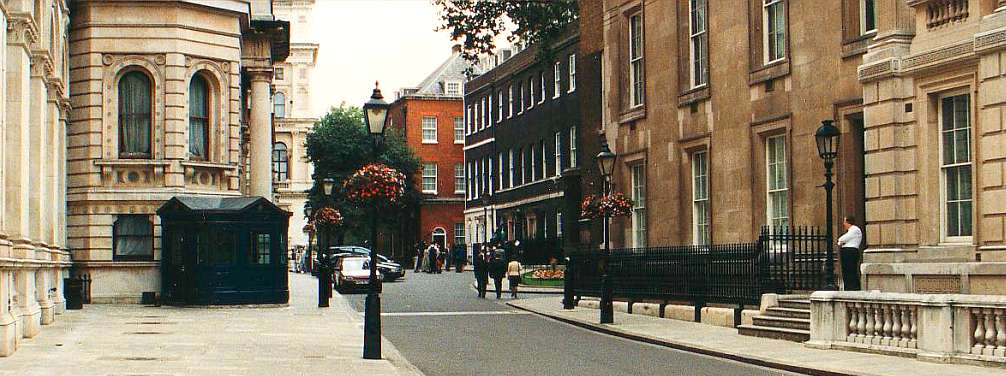
Downing Street looking west. The Foreign and Commonwealth Office is on the left. The three adjoining houses 9–11 Downing St. are of dark brick, 11 having a white stucco ground floor. 12 Downing Street is the later-built red-brick building projecting forward from the line of the other three. The building on the near right is the Barry wing of the Cabinet Office, which has its main frontage on Whitehall.

The land on which 12 Downing Street was built was first sold by Charles Downing to James Steadman in 1723. The house was then sold in 1772 to William Maseres, who leased it three years later to Henry Hunt. This lease was bought out by Simon Frazer, who also acquired Maseres' stake in the property. After Frazer's death in 1783, it was sold by the executors to James Martin, who in turn sold it to the East India Company in 1803. It was purchased that year by the Crown, and was first used to house the Judge Advocate General of the Armed Forces. In 1827, it was taken over by the Colonial Office.

When Downing Street was remodelled in 1846, the houses at 10, 11 and 12 were joined together as a single overall building, No. 12 continuing to accommodate the Colonial Office. After that moved out in 1879, the house at 12 Downing Street was for many decades used as the office of the Chief Whip of the Government, and also for parliamentary dinners. Herbert Gladstone, the son of then-Chancellor of the Exchequer William Ewart Gladstone, was born at 12 Downing Street in 1854. Herbert later became Home Secretary and the first Governor-General of the Union of South Africa.

During the First World War the premises were the headquarters of the Parliamentary Recruitment Committee. It was formed across parties, and managed by the three Chief Whips during the Asquith coalition ministry of 1915–1916. Following the breakup of the coalition government, the Liberal Party Chief Whip John Gulland was blamed in some parts of the media for disconnecting the phone line running to 12 Downing Street. This was denied, and a statement was issued to say that "At no time was the telephone temporarily disconnected." The building became Grade II listed on 14 January 1970.

The residency of the Chief Whips at 12 Downing Street ended in 2001, when Press Secretary Alastair Campbell was moved there from an office in 10 Downing Street by Prime Minister Tony Blair. The Whips were moved to 9 Downing Street, previously only known as the Privy Council building. During Gordon Brown's period as Prime Minister, he moved the Press Office back out of 12 Downing Street and instead used it as an open-plan office for himself and his key advisers, because it contained an individual space large enough for him and his advisers—something not available in 10 Downing Street.
