= Results of the 2016 United Kingdom European Union membership referendum by constituency =

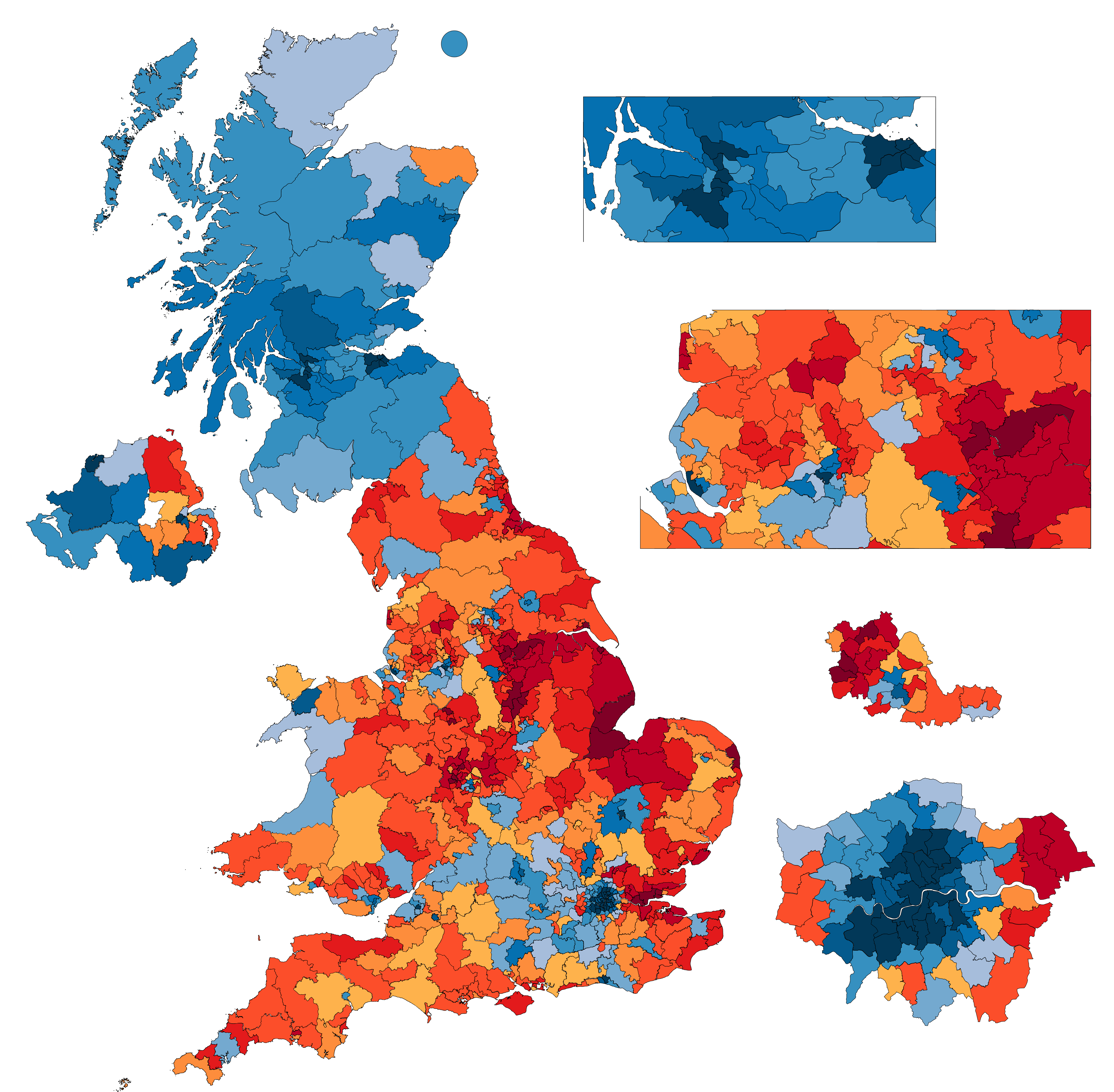
Results map by constituency: Leave: >70% 65% to 70% 60% to 65% 55% to 60% 52% to 55% <52% / Remain: <52% 52% to 55% 55% to 60% 60% to 65% 65% to 70% >70%

The results of the 2016 United Kingdom European Union membership referendum were not counted by parliamentary constituencies except in Northern Ireland. However, a number of local councils and districts released the referendum results by electoral ward or constituency, while in some cases constituency boundaries were coterminous with their local government district. For the remaining constituencies, Dr Chris Hanretty, a Reader in Politics at the University of East Anglia, estimated through a demographic model the 'Leave' and 'Remain' votes in each constituency. Hanretty urges caution in the interpretation of the data as the estimates have a margin of error.

This table shows the state of the parties in each constituency as at the 2016 United Kingdom European Union membership referendum. The colours in the "Constituency" column are those associated with the MP at the time. The colours in the "MP's majority" column are those associated with the second placed candidate at that election.

== Results ==
Constituency	Member of Parliament	MP position	MP's majority	Region/nation	Proportion of votes		Notes
Constituency	Member of Parliament	MP position	MP's majority	Region/nation	Remain %	Leave %	Notes
Streatham	Chuka Umunna	Remain	27.9%	Greater London	79.5%	20.5%	
Bristol West	Thangam Debbonaire	Remain	8.4%	South West England	79.3%	20.7%	
Hackney North and Stoke Newington	Diane Abbott	Remain	48.1%	Greater London	79.1%	20.9%	
Glasgow North	Patrick Grady	Remain	25.2%	Scotland	78.4%	21.6%	
Islington North	Jeremy Corbyn	Remain	43.0%	Greater London	78.4%	21.6%	
Foyle	Mark Durkan	Remain	16.3%	Northern Ireland	78.3%	21.7%	
Edinburgh North and Leith	Deidre Brock	Remain	9.6%	Scotland	78.2%	21.8%	
Dulwich and West Norwood	Helen Hayes	Remain	31.4%	Greater London	78.0%	22.0%	
Hackney South and Shoreditch	Meg Hillier	Remain	50.9%	Greater London	77.9%	22.1%	
Edinburgh South	Ian Murray	Remain	5.4%	Scotland	77.8%	22.2%	
Vauxhall	Kate Hoey	Leave	26.5%	Greater London	77.6%	22.4%	
Battersea	Jane Ellison	Remain	15.6%	Greater London	77.0%	23.0%	
Hampstead and Kilburn	Tulip Siddiq	Remain	2.1%	Greater London	76.6%	23.4%	
Tottenham	David Lammy	Remain	55.4%	Greater London	76.2%	23.8%	
Lewisham Deptford	Vicky Foxcroft	Remain	45.4%	Greater London	75.4%	24.6%	
Hornsey and Wood Green	Catherine West	Remain	19.1%	Greater London	75.0%	25.0%	
Tooting	Rosena Allin-Khan	Remain	19.9%	Greater London	74.7%	25.3%	
East Renfrewshire	Kirsten Oswald	Remain	6.6%	Scotland	74.3%	25.7%	
Belfast West	Paul Maskey	Remain	35.0%	Northern Ireland	74.1%	25.9%	
Cambridge	Daniel Zeichner	Remain	1.2%	East of England	73.8%	26.2%	
Manchester Withington	Jeff Smith	Remain	29.8%	North West England	73.7%	26.3%	
Brighton Pavilion	Caroline Lucas	Remain	14.6%	South East England	73.4%	26.6%	
East Dunbartonshire	John Nicolson	Remain	4.0%	Scotland	73.3%	26.7%	
Holborn and St Pancras	Keir Starmer	Remain	31.0%	Greater London	73.3%	26.7%	
Liverpool Riverside	Louise Ellman	Remain	55.3%	North West England	73.2%	26.8%	
Putney	Justine Greening	Remain	23.8%	Greater London	73.2%	26.8%	
Bermondsey and Old Southwark	Neil Coyle	Remain	8.7%	Greater London	73.0%	27.0%	
Edinburgh East	Tommy Sheppard	Remain	19.3%	Scotland	72.4%	27.6%	
Richmond Park	Zac Goldsmith	Leave	38.9%	Greater London	72.3%	27.7%	
Edinburgh South West	Joanna Cherry	Remain	15.8%	Scotland	72.1%	27.9%	
Glasgow South	Stewart McDonald	Remain	25.2%	Scotland	71.8%	28.2%	
Islington South and Finsbury	Emily Thornberry	Remain	28.7%	Greater London	71.7%	28.3%	
Cities of London and Westminster	Mark Field	Remain	26.7%	Greater London	71.4%	28.6%	
Edinburgh West	Michelle Thomson	Remain	5.9%	Scotland	71.2%	28.8%	
Glasgow Central	Alison Thewliss	Remain	19.5%	Scotland	71.2%	28.8%	
Ealing Central and Acton	Rupa Huq	Remain	0.5%	Greater London	70.9%	29.1%	
Chelsea and Fulham	Greg Hands	Remain	39.8%	Greater London	70.8%	29.2%	
Wimbledon	Stephen Hammond	Remain	26.1%	Greater London	70.6%	29.4%	
Camberwell and Peckham	Harriet Harman	Remain	50.1%	Greater London	69.9%	30.1%	
Cardiff Central	Jo Stevens	Remain	12.9%	Wales	69.7%	30.3%	
Sheffield Central	Paul Blomfield	Remain	39.2%	Yorkshire and the Humber	69.6%	30.4%	
Belfast South	Alasdair McDonnell	Remain	2.3%	Northern Ireland	69.5%	30.5%	
Bethnal Green and Bow	Rushanara Ali	Remain	45.9%	Greater London	69.1%	30.9%	
Finchley and Golders Green	Mike Freer	Remain	11.2%	Greater London	69.1%	30.9%	
Hammersmith	Andy Slaughter	Remain	13.6%	Greater London	69.0%	31.0%	
Kensington	Victoria Borwick	Leave	21.1%	Greater London	68.7%	31.3%	
Glasgow North West	Carol Monaghan	Remain	23.6%	Scotland	68.5%	31.5%	
Bath	Ben Howlett	Remain	8.1%	South West England	68.4%	31.6%	
Aberdeen South	Callum McCaig	Remain	14.9%	Scotland	67.7%	32.3%	
Stirling	Steven Paterson	Remain	23.4%	Scotland	67.7%	32.3%	
Oxford East	Andrew David Smith	Remain	30.1%	South East England	67.7%	32.3%	
South Down	Margaret Ritchie	Remain	13.8%	Northern Ireland	67.2%	32.8%	
Westminster North	Karen Buck	Remain	5.4%	Greater London	67.1%	32.9%	
West Tyrone	Pat Doherty	Remain	26.0%	Northern Ireland	66.8%	33.2%	
Walthamstow	Stella Creasy	Remain	23.4%	Greater London	66.5%	33.5%	
Birmingham Hall Green	Roger Godsiff	Leave	42.1%	West Midlands	66.4%	33.6%	
Twickenham	Tania Mathias	Remain	3.2%	Greater London	66.4%	33.6%	
Hove	Peter Kyle	Remain	2.4%	South East England	66.1%	33.9%	
Paisley and Renfrewshire South	Mhairi Black	Remain	12.3%	Scotland	65.9%	34.1%	
Poplar and Limehouse	Jim Fitzpatrick	Remain	33.1%	Greater London	65.9%	34.1%	
Lewisham West and Penge	Jim Dowd	Remain	26.4%	Greater London	65.6%	34.4%	
Arfon	Hywel Williams	Remain	13.7%	Wales	65.1%	34.9%	
Leeds North West	Greg Mulholland	Remain	6.7%	Yorkshire and the Humber	64.7%	35.3%	
East Lothian	George Kerevan	Remain	11.5%	Scotland	64.6%	35.4%	
Lanark and Hamilton East	Angela Crawley	Remain	18.3%	Scotland	64.6%	35.4%	
Lewisham East	Heidi Alexander	Remain	33.4%	Greater London	64.6%	35.4%	
Birmingham Ladywood	Shabana Mahmood	Remain	60.9%	West Midlands	64.4%	35.6%	
Greenwich and Woolwich	Matthew Pennycook	Remain	25.6%	Greater London	64.3%	35.7%	
Liverpool Wavertree	Luciana Berger	Remain	59.3%	North West England	64.2%	35.8%	
Sheffield Hallam	Nick Clegg	Remain	4.2%	Yorkshire and the Humber	64.1%	35.9%	
Paisley and Renfrewshire North	Gavin Newlands	Remain	18.0%	Scotland	64.0%	36.0%	
Inverclyde	Ronnie Cowan	Remain	24.8%	Scotland	63.8%	36.2%	
Manchester Central	Lucy Powell	Remain	47.7%	North West England	63.4%	36.6%	
Motherwell and Wishaw	Marion Fellows	Remain	24.6%	Scotland	63.1%	36.9%	
Leyton and Wanstead	John Cryer	Leave	27.9%	Greater London	62.9%	37.1%	
Newry and Armagh	Mickey Brady	Remain	8.4%	Northern Ireland	62.9%	37.1%	
Leeds North East	Fabian Hamilton	Remain	15.0%	Yorkshire and the Humber	62.7%	37.3%	
Rutherglen and Hamilton West	Margaret Ferrier	Remain	17.3%	Scotland	62.7%	37.3%	
St Albans	Anne Main	Leave	23.4%	East of England	62.6%	37.4%	
Cumbernauld, Kilsyth and Kirkintilloch East	Stuart McDonald	Remain	29.9%	Scotland	62.1%	37.9%	
East Kilbride, Strathaven and Lesmahagow	Lisa Cameron	Remain	27.3%	Scotland	62.1%	37.9%	
Enfield Southgate	David Burrowes	Leave	10.4%	Greater London	62.1%	37.9%	
Manchester Gorton	Gerald Kaufman	Remain	57.3%	North West England	62.1%	37.9%	
Midlothian	Owen Thompson	Remain	20.4%	Scotland	62.1%	37.9%	
West Dunbartonshire	Martin Docherty	Remain	27.7%	Scotland	62.0%	38.0%	
North East Fife	Stephen Gethins	Remain	9.6%	Scotland	61.9%	38.1%	
Oxford West and Abingdon	Nicola Blackwood	Remain	16.7%	South East England	61.9%	38.1%	
Dundee East	Stewart Hosie	Remain	39.8%	Scotland	61.8%	38.2%	
Reading East	Rob Wilson	Remain	12.9%	South East England	61.8%	38.2%	
Altrincham and Sale West	Graham Brady	Leave	26.3%	North West England	61.6%	38.4%	
South Cambridgeshire	Heidi Allen	Remain	33.5%	East of England	61.6%	38.4%	
York Central	Rachael Maskell	Remain	14.1%	Yorkshire and the Humber	61.5%	38.5%	
West Aberdeenshire and Kincardine	Stuart Donaldson	Remain	12.7%	Scotland	61.4%	38.6%	
Coatbridge, Chryston and Bellshill	Phil Boswell	Remain	22.7%	Scotland	61.3%	38.7%	
Cardiff North	Craig Williams	Remain	4.2%	Wales	60.9%	39.0%	
Ochil and South Perthshire	Tasmina Ahmed-Sheikh	Remain	17.6%	Scotland	60.8%	39.2%	
Argyll and Bute	Brendan O'Hara	Remain	16.3%	Scotland	60.6%	39.4%	
Kilmarnock and Loudoun	Alan Brown	Remain	25.3%	Scotland	60.4%	39.6%	
Mid Ulster	Francie Molloy	Remain	33.3%	Northern Ireland	60.4%	39.6%	
Hitchin and Harpenden	Peter Lilley	Leave	36.2%	East of England	60.3%	39.7%	
Winchester	Steve Brine	Remain	30.6%	South East England	60.3%	39.7%	
Airdrie and Shotts	Neil Gray	Remain	19.8%	Scotland	60.0%	40.0%	
Dunfermline and West Fife	Douglas Chapman	Remain	18.5%	Scotland	60.0%	40.0%	
Perth and North Perthshire	Pete Wishart	Remain	17.8%	Scotland	59.9%	40.1%	
Norwich South	Clive Lewis	Remain	15.8%	East of England	59.8%	40.2%	
Orkney and Shetland	Alistair Carmichael	Remain	3.6%	Scotland	59.7%	40.3%	
South West Surrey	Jeremy Hunt	Remain	49.8%	South East England	59.4%	40.6%	
Glasgow North East	Anne McLaughlin	Remain	24.4%	Scotland	59.3%	40.7%	
Chipping Barnet	Theresa Villiers	Leave	14.4%	Greater London	59.1%	40.9%	
Croydon North	Steve Reed	Remain	39.9%	Greater London	59.1%	40.9%	
Glasgow South West	Chris Stephens	Remain	24.3%	Scotland	59.1%	40.9%	
Dundee West	Chris Law	Remain	38.2%	Scotland	58.9%	41.1%	
Guildford	Anne Milton	Remain	41.6%	South East England	58.9%	41.1%	
Newcastle upon Tyne East	Nick Brown	Remain	31.9%	North East England	58.9%	41.1%	
Warwick and Leamington	Chris White	Remain	13.1%	West Midlands	58.9%	41.1%	
Inverness, Nairn, Badenoch and Strathspey	Drew Hendry	Remain	18.8%	Scotland	58.7%	41.3%	
Rushcliffe	Kenneth Clarke	Remain	25.1%	East Midlands	58.7%	41.3%	
Fermanagh and South Tyrone	Tom Elliott	Leave	1.0%	Northern Ireland	58.6%	41.4%	
Kingston and Surbiton	James Berry	Remain	4.8%	Greater London	58.5%	41.5%	
Bristol North West	Charlotte Leslie	Leave	9.5%	South West England	58.4%	41.6%	
Esher and Walton	Dominic Raab	Leave	50.2%	South East England	58.4%	41.6%	
Kirkcaldy and Cowdenbeath	Roger Mullin	Remain	18.9%	Scotland	58.4%	41.6%	
Linlithgow and East Falkirk	Martyn Day	Remain	21.0%	Scotland	58.4%	41.6%	
Ealing Southall	Virendra Sharma	Remain	43.3%	Greater London	58.2%	41.8%	
Falkirk	John McNally	Remain	32.6%	Scotland	58.1%	41.9%	
Hendon	Matthew Offord	Leave	7.5%	Greater London	58.1%	41.9%	
North Ayrshire and Arran	Patricia Gibson	Remain	25.2%	Scotland	57.8%	42.2%	
Central Ayrshire	Philippa Whitford	Remain	26.8%	Scotland	57.8%	42.2%	
Wokingham	John Redwood	Leave	43.2%	South East England	57.6%	42.4%	
Leicester South	Jonathan Ashworth	Remain	38.9%	East Midlands	57.5%	42.5%	
Swansea West	Geraint Davies	Remain	20.0%	Wales	57.4%	42.6%	
Cheadle	Mary Robinson	Remain	12.2%	North West England	57.3%	42.7%	
Cheltenham	Alex Chalk	Remain	12.1%	South West England	57.3%	42.7%	
City of Chester	Chris Matheson	Remain	0.2%	North West England	57.3%	42.7%	
Ayr, Carrick and Cumnock	Corri Wilson	Remain	21.6%	Scotland	57.1%	42.9%	
Brent Central	Dawn Butler	Remain	41.8%	Greater London	57.1%	42.9%	
Nottingham East	Chris Leslie	Remain	33.8%	East Midlands	57.1%	42.9%	
Aberdeen North	Kirsty Blackman	Remain	30.5%	Scotland	57.0%	43.0%	
Brent North	Barry Gardiner	Remain	20.7%	Greater London	57.0%	43.0%	
Henley	John Howell	Remain	45.9%	South East England	57.0%	43.0%	
Berwickshire, Roxburgh and Selkirk	Calum Kerr	Remain	0.6%	Scotland	56.8%	43.2%	
Brentford and Isleworth	Ruth Cadbury	Remain	0.8%	Greater London	56.7%	43.3%	
Ross, Skye and Lochaber	Ian Blackford	Remain	12.3%	Scotland	56.7%	43.3%	
Brighton Kemptown	Simon Kirby	Remain	1.5%	South East England	57.6%	43.4%	
Harrow West	Gareth Thomas	Remain	4.7%	Greater London	56.6%	43.4%	
Glasgow East	Natalie McGarry	Remain	24.5%	Scotland	56.2%	43.8%	
Ilford South	Mike Gapes	Remain	38.1%	Greater London	56.2%	43.8%	
Livingston	Hannah Bardell	Remain	29.3%	Scotland	56.2%	43.8%	
Dumfriesshire, Clydesdale and Tweeddale	David Mundell	Remain	1.5%	Scotland	56.1%	43.9%	
Woking	Jonathan Lord	Leave	40.2%	South East England	56.0%	44.0%	
City of Durham	Roberta Blackman-Woods	Remain	25.0%	North East England	55.7%	44.3%	
Gordon	Alex Salmond	Remain	15.0%	Scotland	55.5%	44.5%	
Exeter	Ben Bradshaw	Remain	13.3%	South West England	55.3%	44.7%	
Mitcham and Morden	Siobhain McDonagh	Remain	37.5%	Greater London	55.3%	44.7%	
Tunbridge Wells	Greg Clark	Remain	44.5%	South East England	55.3%	44.7%	
Wirral West	Margaret Greenwood	Remain	1.0%	North West England	55.3%	44.7%	
Cardiff West	Kevin Brennan	Remain	15.5%	Wales	55.2%	44.8%	
Na h-Eileanan an Iar	Angus MacNeil	Remain	25.7%	Scotland	55.2%	44.8%	
Cardiff South and Penarth	Stephen Doughty	Remain	16.0%	Wales	55.1%	44.9%	
South East Cambridgeshire	Lucy Frazer	Remain	28.3%	East of England	55.1%	44.9%	
York Outer	Julian Sturdy	Leave	24.4%	Yorkshire and the Humber	55.1%	44.9%	
Chesham and Amersham	Cheryl Gillan	Leave	45.4%	South East England	55.0%	45.0%	
Sefton Central	Bill Esterson	Remain	24.2%	North West England	54.9%	45.1%	
Canterbury	Julian Brazier	Leave	18.3%	South East England	54.7%	45.3%	
Dumfries and Galloway	Richard Arkless	Remain	11.5%	Scotland	54.7%	45.3%	
Hexham	Guy Opperman	Remain	27.8%	North East England	54.7%	45.3%	
Ceredigion	Mark Williams	Remain	8.2%	Wales	54.6%	45.4%	
Maidenhead	Theresa May	Remain	54.0%	South East England	54.6%	45.4%	
Edmonton	Kate Osamor	Remain	37.3%	Greater London	54.5%	45.5%	
Southport	John Pugh	Remain	3.0%	North West England	54.5%	45.5%	
Croydon South	Chris Philp	Remain	29.7%	Greater London	54.2%	45.8%	
Pontypridd	Owen Smith	Remain	23.7%	Wales	54.2%	45.8%	
Romsey and Southampton North	Caroline Nokes	Remain	36.6%	South East England	54.2%	45.8%	
Tatton	George Osborne	Remain	40.3%	North West England	54.2%	45.8%	
North East Hampshire	Ranil Jayawardena	Leave	55.4%	South East England	54.1%	45.9%	
Stroud	Neil Carmichael	Remain	8.0%	South West England	54.1%	45.9%	
Windsor	Adam Afriyie	Leave	50.0%	South East England	54.0%	46.0%	
Ealing North	Stephen Pound	Remain	25.4%	Greater London	53.7%	46.3%	
Witney	David Cameron	Remain	43.0%	South East England	53.7%	46.3%	
South West Hertfordshire	David Gauke	Remain	40.6%	East of England	53.7%	46.3%	
Wantage	Ed Vaizey	Remain	37.3%	South East England	53.6%	46.4%	
Glenrothes	Peter Grant	Remain	29.2%	Scotland	53.6%	46.4%	
Kenilworth and Southam	Jeremy Wright	Remain	43.0%	West Midlands	53.5%	46.5%	
Nottingham South	Lilian Greenwood	Remain	16.0%	East Midlands	53.5%	46.5%	
Mid Sussex	Nicholas Soames	Remain	42.2%	South East England	53.4%	46.6%	
Wirral South	Alison McGovern	Remain	11.0%	North West England	53.4%	46.6%	
Bradford West	Naz Shah	Remain	28.3%	Yorkshire and the Humber	53.3%	46.7%	
Bristol East	Kerry McCarthy	Remain	8.6%	South West England	53.2%	46.8%	
Stockport	Ann Coffey	Remain	25.4%	North West England	53.2%	46.8%	
Lewes	Maria Caulfield	Leave	2.1%	South East England	53.1%	46.9%	
Birmingham Selly Oak	Steve McCabe	Remain	18.6%	West Midlands	53.1%	46.9%	
East Ham	Stephen Timms	Remain	65.5%	Greater London	53.1%	46.9%	
Bristol South	Karin Smyth	Remain	14.0%	South West England	52.9%	47.1%	
Truro and Falmouth	Sarah Newton	Remain	27.2%	South West England	52.9%	47.1%	
Harrogate and Knaresborough	Andrew Jones	Remain	30.7%	Yorkshire and the Humber	52.8%	47.2%	
Birmingham Edgbaston	Gisela Stuart	Leave	6.6%	West Midlands	52.7%	47.3%	
West Ham	Lyn Brown	Remain	53.0%	Greater London	52.7%	47.3%	
Leeds Central	Hilary Benn	Remain	37.7%	Yorkshire and the Humber	52.6%	47.4%	
Westmorland and Lonsdale	Tim Farron	Remain	18.3%	North West England	52.6%	47.4%	
Harrow East	Bob Blackman	Leave	9.7%	Greater London	52.5%	47.5%	
Newbury	Richard Benyon	Remain	46.0%	South East England	52.5%	47.5%	
Mole Valley	Paul Beresford	Remain	46.1%	South East England	52.5%	47.5%	
North Down	Sylvia Hermon	Remain	25.6%	Northern Ireland	52.4%	47.6%	
Reigate	Crispin Blunt	Leave	43.5%	South East England	52.3%	47.7%	
The Cotswolds	Geoffrey Clifton-Brown	Leave	37.9%	South West England	52.3%	47.7%	
Garston and Halewood	Maria Eagle	Remain	55.4%	North West England	52.2%	47.8%	
Monmouth	David Davies	Leave	23.1%	Wales	52.2%	47.8%	
Tynemouth	Alan Campbell	Remain	15.4%	North East England	52.2%	47.8%	
Epsom and Ewell	Chris Grayling	Leave	42.8%	South East England	52.1%	47.9%	
Filton and Bradley Stoke	Jack Lopresti	Leave	20.0%	South West England	52.1%	47.9%	
North Somerset	Liam Fox	Leave	39.2%	South West England	52.1%	47.9%	
East Londonderry	Gregory Campbell	Leave	22.5%	Northern Ireland	52.0%	48.0%	
Wycombe	Steve Baker	Leave	28.9%	South East England	52.0%	48.0%	
Angus	Mike Weir	Remain	25.2%	Scotland	51.9%	48.1%	
Macclesfield	David Rutley	Remain	29.9%	North West England	51.9%	48.1%	
Dwyfor Meirionnydd	Liz Saville-Roberts	Remain	18.2%	Wales	51.7%	48.3%	
Newcastle upon Tyne Central	Chi Onwurah	Remain	36.1%	North East England	51.7%	48.3%	
Pudsey	Stuart Andrew	Leave	8.8%	Yorkshire and the Humber	51.7%	48.3%	
Beckenham	Bob Stewart	Leave	37.8%	Greater London	51.6%	48.4%	
Stretford and Urmston	Kate Green	Remain	25.2%	North West England	51.6%	48.4%	
Buckingham	John Bercow	Remain	42.7%	South East England	51.4%	48.6%	
Horsham	Jeremy Quin	Remain	43.3%	South East England	51.4%	48.6%	
East Hampshire	Damian Hinds	Remain	48.7%	South East England	51.3%	48.7%	
Coventry South	Jim Cunningham	Remain	7.3%	West Midlands	51.1%	48.9%	
Ruislip, Northwood and Pinner	Nick Hurd	Remain	39.5%	Greater London	51.0%	49.0%	
Beaconsfield	Dominic Grieve	Remain	49.5%	South East England	50.8%	49.2%	
Chingford and Woodford Green	Iain Duncan Smith	Leave	19.1%	Greater London	50.8%	49.2%	
Enfield North	Joan Ryan	Remain	2.4%	Greater London	50.8%	49.2%	
Hertford and Stortford	Mark Prisk	Remain	38.2%	East of England	50.8%	49.2%	
Caithness, Sutherland and Easter Ross	Paul Monaghan	Remain	11.2%	Scotland	50.6%	49.4%	
Belfast North	Nigel Dodds	Leave	13.1%	Northern Ireland	50.4%	49.6%	
Bridgend	Madeleine Moon	Remain	4.9%	Wales	50.4%	49.6%	
Loughborough	Nicky Morgan	Remain	17.7%	East Midlands	50.4%	49.6%	
Bromley and Chislehurst	Bob Neill	Remain	30.8%	Greater London	50.2%	49.8%	
Colne Valley	Jason McCartney	Leave	9.5%	Yorkshire and the Humber	50.2%	49.8%	
Milton Keynes North	Mark Lancaster	Remain	16.9%	South East England	50.2%	49.8%	
Runnymede and Weybridge	Philip Hammond	Remain	44.2%	South East England	50.2%	49.8%	
Wythenshawe and Sale East	Mike Kane	Remain	24.4%	North West England	50.2%	49.8%	
Moray	Angus Robertson	Remain	18.4%	Scotland	50.1%	49.9%	
Wallasey	Angela Eagle	Remain	37.7%	North West England	50.1%	49.9%	
Gower	Byron Davies	Remain	0.1%	Wales	49.9%	50.1%	
Weaver Vale	Graham Evans	Remain	1.7%	North West England	49.9%	50.1%	
Liverpool West Derby	Stephen Twigg	Remain	66.7%	North West England	49.8%	50.2%	
Croydon Central	Gavin Barwell	Remain	0.3%	Greater London	49.7%	50.3%	
North Wiltshire	James Gray	Leave	41.6%	South West England	49.7%	50.3%	
Salisbury	John Glen	Remain	40.3%	South West England	49.7%	50.3%	
East Devon	Hugo Swire	Remain	22.4%	South West England	49.6%	50.4%	
High Peak	Andrew Bingham	Leave	9.6%	East Midlands	49.5%	50.5%	
Banbury	Victoria Prentis	Remain	31.7%	South East England	49.5%	50.5%	
Chelmsford	Simon Burns	Remain	35.9%	East of England	49.5%	50.5%	
Arundel and South Downs	Nick Herbert	Remain	46.3%	South East England	49.4%	50.6%	
Chichester	Andrew Tyrie	Remain	42.7%	South East England	49.4%	50.6%	
Southampton Test	Alan Whitehead	Remain	8.7%	South East England	49.4%	50.6%	
South Antrim	Danny Kinahan	Remain	2.6%	Northern Ireland	49.4%	50.6%	
Warrington South	David Mowat	Remain	4.6%	North West England	49.4%	50.6%	
Hertsmere	Oliver Dowden	Remain	36.9%	East of England	49.2%	50.8%	
Lancaster and Fleetwood	Cat Smith	Remain	3.0%	North West England	49.1%	50.9%	
Saffron Walden	Alan Haselhurst	Remain	43.4%	East of England	49.1%	50.9%	
Somerton and Frome	David Warburton	Leave	33.6%	South West England	49.1%	50.9%	
West Dorset	Oliver Letwin	Remain	28.6%	South West England	49.1%	50.9%	
Ynys Môn	Albert Owen	Remain	0.7%	Wales	49.1%	50.9%	
Colchester	Will Quince	Leave	11.5%	East of England	49.0%	51.0%	
Huddersfield	Barry Sheerman	Remain	18.1%	Yorkshire and the Humber	49.0%	51.0%	
Central Devon	Mel Stride	Remain	39.0%	South West England	48.9%	51.1%	
South Norfolk	Richard Bacon	Leave	35.9%	East of England	48.9%	51.1%	
Stratford-on-Avon	Nadhim Zahawi	Leave	44.5%	West Midlands	48.9%	51.1%	
Watford	Richard Harrington	Remain	17.4%	East of England	48.9%	51.1%	
Birmingham Perry Barr	Khalid Mahmood	Remain	35.9%	West Midlands	48.8%	51.2%	
Derbyshire Dales	Patrick McLoughlin	Remain	29.7%	East Midlands	48.8%	51.2%	
Sutton and Cheam	Paul Scully	Leave	7.9%	Greater London	48.8%	51.2%	
Blackley and Broughton	Graham Stringer	Leave	45.5%	North West England	48.7%	51.3%	
North East Hertfordshire	Oliver Heald	Remain	36.5%	East of England	48.7%	51.3%	
Belfast East	Gavin Robinson	Leave	6.5%	Northern Ireland	48.6%	51.4%	
Devizes	Claire Perry	Remain	42.3%	South West England	48.6%	51.4%	
Birmingham Hodge Hill	Liam Byrne	Remain	56.9%	West Midlands	48.5%	51.5%	
Shipley	Philip Davies	Leave	19.0%	Yorkshire and the Humber	48.5%	51.5%	
South Swindon	Robert Buckland	Remain	11.7%	South West England	48.5%	51.5%	
Leicester West	Liz Kendall	Remain	20.9%	East Midlands	48.4%	51.6%	
Birkenhead	Frank Field	Leave	52.8%	North West England	48.3%	51.7%	
Brecon and Radnorshire	Christopher Davies	Leave	12.7%	Wales	48.3%	51.7%	
Sutton Coldfield	Andrew Mitchell	Remain	32.3%	West Midlands	48.3%	51.7%	
Portsmouth South	Flick Drummond	Remain	12.5%	South East England	48.2%	51.8%	
Eltham	Clive Efford	Remain	6.2%	Greater London	48.2%	51.8%	
Bedford	Richard Fuller	Leave	2.4%	East of England	48.1%	51.9%	
Surrey Heath	Michael Gove	Leave	45.6%	South East England	48.1%	51.9%	
Aylesbury	David Lidington	Remain	31.0%	South East England	47.9%	52.1%	
North East Somerset	Jacob Rees-Mogg	Leave	24.9%	South West England	47.9%	52.1%	
Eddisbury	Antoinette Sandbach	Remain	27.4%	North West England	47.8%	52.2%	
Harborough	Edward Garnier	Remain	37.4%	East Midlands	47.8%	52.2%	
Hazel Grove	William Wragg	Leave	15.2%	North West England	47.8%	52.2%	
Mid Bedfordshire	Nadine Dorries	Leave	40.2%	East of England	47.8%	52.2%	
Chippenham	Michelle Donelan	Remain	18.2%	South West England	47.7%	52.3%	
Vale of Glamorgan	Alun Cairns	Remain	13.4%	Wales	47.7%	52.3%	
Broxtowe	Anna Soubry	Remain	8.0%	East Midlands	47.6%	52.4%	
Knowsley	George Howarth	Remain	68.3%	North West England	47.6%	52.4%	
Clwyd West	David Jones	Leave	17.7%	Wales	47.5%	52.5%	
Ilford North	Wes Streeting	Remain	1.2%	Greater London	47.5%	52.5%	
Mid Derbyshire	Pauline Latham	Leave	26.8%	East Midlands	47.5%	52.5%	
Tonbridge and Malling	Tom Tugendhat	Remain	44.2%	South East England	47.5%	52.5%	
Wealden	Nus Ghani	Leave	40.3%	South East England	47.5%	52.5%	
Welwyn Hatfield	Grant Shapps	Remain	24.2%	East of England	47.5%	52.5%	
West Worcestershire	Harriett Baldwin	Remain	41.7%	West Midlands	47.5%	52.5%	
Congleton	Fiona Bruce	Leave	32.9%	North West England	47.4%	52.6%	
Reading West	Alok Sharma	Remain	13.7%	South East England	47.4%	52.6%	
South Northamptonshire	Andrea Leadsom	Leave	43.4%	East Midlands	47.4%	52.6%	
Upper Bann	David Simpson	Leave	4.8%	Northern Ireland	47.4%	52.6%	
Meon Valley	George Hollingbery	Remain	46.2%	South East England	47.1%	52.9%	
Milton Keynes South	Iain Stewart	Leave	14.7%	South East England	47.1%	52.9%	
Taunton Deane	Rebecca Pow	Remain	26.8%	South West England	47.1%	52.9%	
Shrewsbury and Atcham	Daniel Kawczynski	Leave	17.7%	West Midlands	47.0%	53.0%	
Newport West	Paul Flynn	Remain	8.7%	Wales	47.0%	53.0%	
Skipton and Ripon	Julian Smith	Remain	38.1%	Yorkshire and the Humber	47.0%	53.0%	
Lagan Valley	Jeffrey Donaldson	Leave	32.7%	Northern Ireland	46.9%	53.1%	
Leicester East	Keith Vaz	Remain	38.2%	East Midlands	46.9%	53.1%	
Bracknell	Phillip Lee	Remain	38.9%	South East England	46.8%	53.2%	
Calder Valley	Craig Whittaker	Remain	8.3%	Yorkshire and the Humber	46.8%	53.2%	
Huntingdon	Jonathan Djanogly	Remain	34.7%	East of England	46.8%	53.2%	
North East Bedfordshire	Alistair Burt	Remain	43.7%	East of England	46.8%	53.2%	
Aberconwy	Guto Bebb	Remain	13.3%	Wales	46.7%	53.3%	
Keighley	Kris Hopkins	Remain	6.2%	Yorkshire and the Humber	46.7%	53.3%	
Solihull	Julian Knight	Remain	23.6%	West Midlands	46.7%	53.3%	
Thornbury and Yate	Luke Hall	Remain	3.1%	South West England	46.7%	53.3%	
Wells	James Heappey	Remain	13.3%	South West England	46.6%	53.4%	
Bournemouth East	Tobias Ellwood	Remain	32.6%	South West England	46.5%	53.5%	
Basingstoke	Maria Miller	Remain	20.8%	South East England	46.4%	53.6%	
Bury North	David Nuttall	Leave	0.8%	North West England	46.4%	53.6%	
East Worthing and Shoreham	Tim Loughton	Leave	30.0%	South East England	46.4%	53.6%	
Salford and Eccles	Rebecca Long-Bailey	Remain	29.0%	North West England	46.4%	53.6%	
Blackburn	Kate Hollern	Remain	29.0%	North West England	46.3%	53.7%	
Bury St Edmunds	Jo Churchill	Remain	35.9%	East of England	46.3%	53.7%	
Carmarthen East and Dinefwr	Jonathan Edwards	Remain	14.2%	Wales	46.3%	53.7%	
Derby North	Amanda Solloway	Remain	0.1%	East Midlands	46.3%	53.7%	
Tewkesbury	Laurence Robertson	Leave	39.7%	South West England	46.3%	53.7%	
Worcester	Robin Walker	Remain	11.4%	West Midlands	46.3%	53.7%	
Liverpool Walton	Steve Rotheram	Remain	72.3%	North West England	46.2%	53.8%	
Sevenoaks	Michael Fallon	Remain	39.0%	South East England	46.2%	53.8%	
Rutland and Melton	Alan Duncan	Remain	39.8%	East Midlands	46.1%	53.9%	
Slough	Fiona Mactaggart	Remain	15.2%	South East England	46.1%	53.9%	
Banff and Buchan	Eilidh Whiteford	Remain	31.4%	Scotland	46.0%	54.0%	
Broadland	Keith Simpson	Remain	31.7%	East of England	46.0%	54.0%	
Eastleigh	Mims Davies	Leave	16.5%	South East England	46.0%	54.0%	
Totnes	Sarah Wollaston	Remain	38.8%	South West England	46.0%	54.0%	
Wyre and Preston North	Ben Wallace	Remain	28.4%	North West England	46.0%	54.0%	
East Surrey	Sam Gyimah	Remain	40.4%	South East England	45.9%	54.1%	
South Suffolk	James Cartlidge	Remain	33.8%	East of England	45.9%	54.1%	
Neath	Christina Rees	Remain	25.7%	Wales	45.8%	54.2%	
St Ives	Derek Thomas	Leave	5.1%	South West England	45.8%	54.2%	
Erith and Thamesmead	Teresa Pearce	Remain	22.4%	Greater London	45.7%	54.3%	
Central Suffolk and North Ipswich	Dan Poulter	Remain	37.2%	East of England	45.6%	54.4%	
Plymouth Sutton and Devonport	Oliver Colvile	Remain	1.1%	South West England	45.6%	54.4%	
Bury South	Ivan Lewis	Remain	10.4%	North West England	45.5%	54.5%	
North West Hampshire	Kit Malthouse	Leave	43.4%	South East England	45.5%	54.5%	
Richmond (Yorks)	Rishi Sunak	Leave	36.2%	Yorkshire and the Humber	45.4%	54.6%	
Wolverhampton South West	Rob Marris	Remain	2.0%	West Midlands	45.6%	54.6%	
Delyn	David Hanson	Remain	7.8%	Wales	45.3%	54.7%	
Bootle	Peter Dowd	Remain	63.6%	North West England	45.2%	54.8%	
Leeds West	Rachel Reeves	Remain	27.9%	Yorkshire and the Humber	45.1%	54.9%	
North West Durham	Pat Glass	Remain	23.5%	North East England	45.1%	54.9%	
West Lancashire	Rosie Cooper	Remain	16.8%	North West England	45.1%	54.9%	
Southend West	David Amess	Leave	31.5%	East of England	45.0%	55.0%	
Caerphilly	Wayne David	Remain	25.0%	Wales	44.9%	55.1%	
Hemel Hempstead	Mike Penning	Leave	29.1%	East of England	44.9%	55.1%	
Bradford East	Imran Hussain	Remain	17.1%	Yorkshire and the Humber	44.8%	55.2%	
East Antrim	Sammy Wilson	Leave	17.3%	Northern Ireland	44.8%	55.2%	
South West Devon	Gary Streeter	Remain	39.9%	South West England	44.8%	55.2%	
Carmarthen West and South Pembrokeshire	Simon Hart	Remain	15.0%	Wales	44.7%	55.3%	
Penrith and The Border	Rory Stewart	Remain	45.3%	North West England	44.7%	55.3%	
Fareham	Suella Braverman	Leave	40.7%	South East England	44.6%	55.4%	
Bromsgrove	Sajid Javid	Remain	31.6%	West Midlands	44.6%	55.4%	
Haltemprice and Howden	David Davis	Leave	33.2%	Yorkshire and the Humber	44.6%	55.4%	
Llanelli	Nia Griffith	Remain	18.4%	Wales	44.6%	55.4%	
Luton South	Gavin Shuker	Remain	13.5%	East of England	44.6%	55.4%	
Berwick-upon-Tweed	Anne-Marie Trevelyan	Leave	12.2%	North East England	44.5%	55.5%	
Bolton West	Chris Green	Leave	1.6%	North West England	44.5%	55.5%	
Strangford	Jim Shannon	Leave	30.0%	Northern Ireland	44.5%	55.5%	
Newark	Robert Jenrick	Remain	35.3%	East Midlands	44.3%	55.7%	
Preseli Pembrokeshire	Stephen Crabb	Remain	12.3%	Wales	44.3%	55.7%	
New Forest West	Desmond Swayne	Leave	43.5%	South East England	44.2%	55.8%	
Maidstone and The Weald	Helen Grant	Remain	21.4%	South East England	44.2%	55.8%	
Suffolk Coastal	Therese Coffey	Remain	33.9%	East of England	44.2%	55.8%	
Feltham and Heston	Seema Malhotra	Remain	23.2%	Greater London	44.1%	55.9%	
Montgomeryshire	Glyn Davies	Leave	15.8%	Wales	44.1%	55.9%	
Vale of Clwyd	James Davies	Leave	0.7%	Wales	44.1%	55.9%	
Gateshead	Ian Mearns	Remain	39.0%	North East England	44.0%	56.0%	
Gedling	Vernon Coaker	Remain	6.2%	East Midlands	43.9%	56.1%	
Newton Abbot	Anne Marie Morris	Leave	23.4%	South West England	43.9%	56.1%	
St Helens South and Whiston	Marie Rimmer	Remain	43.9%	North West England	43.9%	56.1%	
Wansbeck	Ian Lavery	Remain	28.2%	North East England	43.9%	56.1%	
Worthing West	Peter Bottomley	Remain	33.2%	South East England	43.9%	56.1%	
Hastings and Rye	Amber Rudd	Remain	9.4%	South East England	43.8%	56.2%	
Blaydon	David Anderson	Remain	31.7%	North East England	43.7%	56.3%	
Carshalton and Wallington	Tom Brake	Remain	3.2%	Greater London	43.7%	56.3%	
Elmet and Rothwell	Alec Shelbrooke	Remain	14.7%	Yorkshire and the Humber	43.7%	56.3%	
Uxbridge and South Ruislip	Boris Johnson	Leave	23.9%	Greater London	43.7%	56.3%	
North Dorset	Simon Hoare	Remain	39.6%	South West England	43.6%	56.4%	
Thirsk and Malton	Kevin Hollinrake	Remain	37.2%	Yorkshire and the Humber	43.6%	56.4%	
Chorley	Lindsay Hoyle	Remain	8.8%	North West England	43.5%	56.5%	
Fylde	Mark Menzies	Remain	30.4%	North West England	43.5%	56.5%	
Ipswich	Ben Gummer	Remain	7.7%	East of England	43.5%	56.5%	
Weston-super-Mare	John Penrose	Remain	29.7%	South West England	43.4%	56.6%	
Barrow and Furness	John Woodcock	Remain	1.8%	North West England	43.3%	56.7%	
Kingswood	Chris Skidmore	Remain	18.7%	South West England	43.2%	56.8%	
Preston	Mark Hendrick	Remain	36.1%	North West England	43.2%	56.8%	
South Ribble	Seema Kennedy	Remain	11.4%	North West England	43.2%	56.8%	
Cynon Valley	Ann Clwyd	Remain	30.9%	Wales	43.1%	56.9%	
North West Cambridgeshire	Shailesh Vara	Remain	32.4%	East of England	43.1%	56.9%	
Poole	Robert Syms	Leave	33.3%	South West England	43.1%	56.9%	
North Devon	Peter Heaton-Jones	Remain	13.3%	South West England	43.0%	57.0%	
Torridge and West Devon	Geoffrey Cox	Leave	32.5%	South West England	43.0%	57.0%	
Newcastle upon Tyne North	Catherine McKinnell	Remain	22.6%	North East England	42.9%	57.1%	
Stevenage	Stephen McPartland	Leave	10.4%	East of England	42.9%	57.1%	
Dewsbury	Paula Sherriff	Remain	2.7%	Yorkshire and the Humber	42.8%	57.2%	
Stafford	Jeremy Lefroy	Remain	18.8%	West Midlands	42.8%	57.2%	
Lincoln	Karl McCartney	Leave	3.1%	East Midlands	42.7%	57.3%	
Norwich North	Chloe Smith	Remain	10.2%	East of England	42.7%	57.3%	
Wrexham	Ian Lucas	Remain	5.6%	Wales	42.7%	57.3%	
North Swindon	Justin Tomlinson	Leave	22.6%	South West England	42.6%	57.4%	
Lichfield	Michael Fabricant	Leave	35.3%	West Midlands	42.5%	57.5%	
Orpington	Jo Johnson	Remain	40.7%	Greater London	42.5%	57.5%	
Rochdale	Simon Danczuk	Remain	27.4%	North West England	42.5%	57.5%	
Bexhill and Battle	Huw Merriman	Remain	36.4%	South East England	42.4%	57.6%	
Eastbourne	Caroline Ansell	Leave	1.4%	South East England	42.4%	57.6%	
Sheffield Heeley	Louise Haigh	Remain	30.8%	Yorkshire and the Humber	42.4%	57.6%	
South West Wiltshire	Andrew Murrison	Leave	35.2%	South West England	42.4%	57.6%	
Tiverton and Honiton	Neil Parish	Remain	37.5%	South West England	42.4%	57.6%	
Selby and Ainsty	Nigel Adams	Leave	25.7%	Yorkshire and the Humber	42.4%	57.6%	
Alyn and Deeside	Mark Tami	Remain	8.1%	Wales	42.3%	57.7%	
Bolton North East	David Crausby	Remain	10.1%	North West England	42.3%	57.7%	
Ellesmere Port and Neston	Justin Madders	Remain	13.4%	North West England	42.3%	57.7%	
Bournemouth West	Conor Burns	Leave	29.7%	South West England	42.2%	57.8%	
Halton	Derek Twigg	Remain	45.1%	North West England	42.2%	57.8%	
Stockton South	James Wharton	Leave	9.7%	North East England	42.2%	57.8%	
Mid Dorset and North Poole	Michael Tomlinson	Leave	22.6%	South West England	42.1%	57.9%	
Darlington	Jenny Chapman	Remain	7.7%	North East England	42.0%	58.0%	
Forest of Dean	Mark Harper	Remain	22.2%	South West England	42.0%	58.0%	
Meriden	Caroline Spelman	Remain	35.7%	West Midlands	42.0%	58.0%	
Stone	Bill Cash	Leave	34.6%	West Midlands	42.0%	58.0%	
Aldershot	Gerald Howarth	Leave	32.3%	South East England	41.8%	58.2%	
Charnwood	Ed Argar	Remain	32.4%	East Midlands	41.8%	58.2%	
Faversham and Mid Kent	Helen Whately	Remain	36.4%	South East England	41.8%	58.2%	
Luton North	Kelvin Hopkins	Leave	22.3%	East of England	41.8%	58.2%	
North Herefordshire	Bill Wiggin	Leave	41.6%	West Midlands	41.8%	58.2%	
North Norfolk	Norman Lamb	Remain	8.2%	East of England	41.8%	58.2%	
South Leicestershire	Alberto Costa	Remain	31.2%	East Midlands	41.8%	58.2%	
St Helens North	Conor McGinn	Remain	37.4%	North West England	41.8%	58.2%	
The Wrekin	Mark Pritchard	Remain	23.6%	West Midlands	41.8%	58.2%	
Rugby	Mark Pawsey	Remain	21.1%	West Midlands	41.7%	58.3%	
South East Cornwall	Sheryll Murray	Leave	33.7%	South West England	41.7%	58.3%	
Crawley	Henry Smith	Leave	13.4%	South East England	41.6%	58.4%	
Merthyr Tydfil and Rhymney	Gerald Jones	Remain	35.2%	Wales	41.6%	58.4%	
Ludlow	Philip Dunne	Remain	39.4%	West Midlands	41.5%	58.5%	
Rossendale and Darwen	Jake Berry	Remain	11.5%	North West England	41.5%	58.5%	
Coventry North West	Geoffrey Robinson	Remain	10.0%	West Midlands	41.4%	58.6%	
Ribble Valley	Nigel Evans	Leave	26.0%	North West England	41.4%	58.6%	
South West Bedfordshire	Andrew Selous	Remain	34.7%	East of England	41.4%	58.6%	
Warrington North	Helen Jones	Remain	19.6%	North West England	41.4%	58.6%	
Beverley and Holderness	Graham Stuart	Remain	23.2%	Yorkshire and the Humber	41.3%	58.7%	
Daventry	Chris Heaton-Harris	Leave	40.1%	East Midlands	41.3%	58.7%	
Halifax	Holly Lynch	Remain	1.0%	Yorkshire and the Humber	41.2%	58.8%	
Islwyn	Chris Evans	Remain	29.4%	Wales	41.2%	58.8%	
Gloucester	Richard Graham	Remain	13.8%	South West England	41.1%	58.9%	
Mid Worcestershire	Nigel Huddleston	Remain	39.3%	West Midlands	41.1%	58.9%	
Morecambe and Lunesdale	David Morris	Remain	10.6%	North West England	41.1%	58.9%	
Sedgefield	Phil Wilson	Remain	17.7%	North East England	41.1%	58.9%	
Crewe and Nantwich	Edward Timpson	Remain	7.3%	North West England	41.0%	59.0%	
Coventry North East	Colleen Fletcher	Remain	29.1%	West Midlands	40.8%	59.2%	
Yeovil	Marcus Fysh	Leave	9.3%	South West England	40.8%	59.2%	
Chesterfield	Toby Perkins	Remain	29.8%	East Midlands	40.7%	59.3%	
North Tyneside	Mary Glindon	Remain	36.7%	North East England	40.7%	59.3%	
Stalybridge and Hyde	Jonathan Reynolds	Leave	16.3%	North West England	40.7%	59.3%	
Hayes and Harlington	John McDonnell	Remain	34.8%	Greater London	40.6%	59.4%	
North Shropshire	Owen Paterson	Leave	31.6%	West Midlands	40.6%	59.4%	
South Dorset	Richard Drax	Leave	24.7%	South West England	40.6%	59.4%	
New Forest East	Julian Lewis	Leave	38.8%	South East England	40.5%	59.5%	
North Cornwall	Scott Mann	Leave	13.7%	South West England	40.5%	59.5%	
Ashford	Damian Green	Remain	33.6%	South East England	40.5%	59.5%	
Northampton South	David Mackintosh	Remain	9.8%	East Midlands	40.4%	59.6%	
Morley and Outwood	Andrea Jenkyns	Leave	0.9%	Yorkshire and the Humber	40.3%	59.7%	
Ogmore	Chris Elmore	Remain	36.4%	Wales	40.3%	59.7%	
Blyth Valley	Ronnie Campbell	Leave	24.0%	North East England	40.2%	59.8%	
Christchurch	Christopher Chope	Leave	36.7%	South West England	40.2%	59.8%	
Copeland	Jamie Reed	Remain	6.5%	North West England	40.2%	59.8%	
Worsley and Eccles South	Barbara Keeley	Remain	14.1%	North West England	40.2%	59.8%	
Aberavon	Stephen Kinnock	Remain	33.1%	Wales	40.1%	59.9%	
Kingston upon Hull North	Diana Johnson	Remain	36.5%	Yorkshire and the Humber	40.1%	59.9%	
Oldham East and Saddleworth	Debbie Abrahams	Remain	13.5%	North West England	40.1%	59.9%	
Southampton Itchen	Royston Smith	Leave	5.2%	South East England	40.1%	59.9%	
Sunderland Central	Julie Elliott	Remain	26.8%	North East England	40.0%	60.0%	
Birmingham Yardley	Jess Phillips	Remain	16.0%	West Midlands	39.9%	60.1%	
Corby	Tom Pursglove	Leave	4.3%	East Midlands	39.9%	60.1%	
Hereford and South Herefordshire	Jesse Norman	Unknown	35.7%	West Midlands	39.9%	60.1%	
North Durham	Kevan Jones	Remain	34.0%	North East England	39.9%	60.1%	
Clwyd South	Susan Jones	Remain	6.9%	Wales	39.8%	60.2%	
Newport East	Jessica Morden	Remain	13.4%	Wales	39.8%	60.2%	
Barking	Margaret Hodge	Remain	35.5%	Greater London	39.7%	60.3%	
Batley and Spen	Vacant	n/a	81.0%	Yorkshire and the Humber	39.7%	60.3%	
South Derbyshire	Heather Wheeler	Leave	22.6%	East Midlands	39.7%	60.3%	
Spelthorne	Kwasi Kwarteng	Leave	28.8%	South East England	39.7%	60.3%	
Workington	Sue Hayman	Remain	12.2%	North West England	39.7%	60.3%	
Carlisle	John Stevenson	Remain	6.5%	North West England	39.6%	60.4%	
Rochford and Southend East	James Duddridge	Leave	21.7%	East of England	39.6%	60.4%	
Mid Norfolk	George Freeman	Remain	33.1%	East of England	39.5%	60.5%	
Bishop Auckland	Helen Goodman	Remain	8.9%	North East England	39.4%	60.6%	
Northampton North	Michael Ellis	Remain	8.2%	East Midlands	39.4%	60.6%	
Bosworth	David Tredinnick	Remain	20.5%	East Midlands	39.3%	60.7%	
North West Leicestershire	Andrew Bridgen	Leave	22.1%	East Midlands	39.3%	60.7%	
Brentwood and Ongar	Eric Pickles	Remain	42.0%	East of England	39.2%	60.8%	
Torfaen	Nick Thomas-Symonds	Remain	21.5%	Wales	39.2%	60.8%	
Witham	Priti Patel	Leave	41.5%	East of England	39.2%	60.8%	
Leeds East	Richard Burgon	Remain	32.8%	Yorkshire and the Humber	39.1%	60.9%	
Denton and Reddish	Andrew Gwynne	Remain	27.2%	North West England	39.0%	61.0%	
Epping Forest	Eleanor Laing	Leave	36.4%	East of England	39.0%	61.0%	
Grantham and Stamford	Nick Boles	Remain	35.3%	East Midlands	39.0%	61.0%	
Harwich and North Essex	Bernard Jenkin	Leave	31.3%	East of England	39.0%	61.0%	
Kettering	Philip Hollobone	Leave	26.7%	East Midlands	39.0%	61.0%	
Rhondda	Chris Bryant	Remain	23.6%	Wales	38.8%	61.2%	
Maldon	John Whittingdale	Leave	45.9%	East of England	38.7%	61.3%	
Penistone and Stocksbridge	Angela Smith	Remain	14.3%	Yorkshire and the Humber	38.7%	61.3%	
Scarborough and Whitby	Robert Goodwill	Remain	13.0%	Yorkshire and the Humber	38.7%	61.3%	
Braintree	James Cleverly	Leave	35.0%	East of England	38.6%	61.4%	
Redditch	Karen Lumley	Leave	16.0%	West Midlands	38.6%	61.4%	
Sheffield Brightside and Hillsborough	Gill Furniss	Remain	42.5%	Yorkshire and the Humber	38.6%	61.4%	
Sleaford and North Hykeham	Caroline Johnson	Leave	40.0%	East Midlands	38.5%	61.5%	
Derby South	Margaret Beckett	Remain	21.6%	East Midlands	38.4%	61.6%	
Jarrow	Stephen Hepburn	Remain	36.0%	North East England	38.4%	61.6%	
Newcastle-under-Lyme	Paul Farrelly	Remain	1.5%	West Midlands	38.4%	61.6%	
South Thanet	Craig Mackinlay	Leave	5.7%	South East England	38.4%	61.6%	
Walsall South	Valerie Vaz	Remain	14.4%	West Midlands	38.4%	61.6%	
Ashton-under-Lyne	Angela Rayner	Remain	27.6%	North West England	38.2%	61.8%	
Birmingham Northfield	Richard Burden	Remain	5.9%	West Midlands	38.2%	61.8%	
Folkestone and Hythe	Damian Collins	Remain	25.1%	South East England	38.2%	61.8%	
Warley	John Spellar	Remain	38.9%	West Midlands	38.2%	61.8%	
Gosport	Caroline Dinenage	Remain	35.9%	South East England	38.1%	61.9%	
Washington and Sunderland West	Sharon Hodgson	Remain	35.3%	North East England	38.1%	61.9%	
Isle of Wight	Andrew Turner	Leave	19.5%	South East England	38.1%	61.9%	
Blaenau Gwent	Nick Smith	Remain	40.1%	Wales	38.0%	62.0%	
Gainsborough	Edward Leigh	Leave	31.4%	East Midlands	38.0%	62.0%	
Swansea East	Carolyn Harris	Remain	35.8%	Wales	38.0%	62.0%	
Bridgwater and West Somerset	Ian Liddell-Grainger	Leave	26.8%	South West England	37.9%	62.1%	
North East Derbyshire	Natascha Engel	Remain	3.9%	East Midlands	37.9%	62.1%	
Oldham West and Royton	Jim McMahon	Remain	34.2%	North West England	37.9%	62.1%	
Peterborough	Stewart Jackson	Leave	4.1%	East of England	37.9%	62.1%	
South Shields	Emma Lewell-Buck	Remain	29.3%	North East England	37.9%	62.1%	
North Antrim	Ian Paisley Jr	Leave	27.6%	Northern Ireland	37.8%	62.2%	
Havant	Alan Mak	Remain	31.1%	South East England	37.6%	62.4%	
Heywood and Middleton	Liz McInnes	Remain	10.9%	North West England	37.6%	62.4%	
St Austell and Newquay	Steve Double	Leave	16.2%	South West England	37.6%	62.4%	
Wakefield	Mary Creagh	Remain	6.1%	Yorkshire and the Humber	37.4%	62.6%	
Houghton and Sunderland South	Bridget Phillipson	Remain	33.6%	North East England	37.4%	62.6%	
Torbay	Kevin Foster	Remain	6.8%	South West England	37.4%	62.6%	
Camborne and Redruth	George Eustice	Leave	15.3%	South West England	37.3%	62.7%	
Wigan	Lisa Nandy	Remain	31.4%	North West England	37.3%	62.7%	
Wellingborough	Peter Bone	Leave	32.5%	East Midlands	37.1%	62.9%	
Birmingham Erdington	Jack Dromey	Remain	14.8%	West Midlands	37.0%	63.0%	
Dover	Charlie Elphicke	Remain	12.5%	South East England	36.8%	63.1%	
Old Bexley and Sidcup	James Brokenshire	Remain	33.8%	Greater London	36.8%	63.1%	
Wyre Forest	Mark Garnier	Remain	26.0%	West Midlands	36.9%	63.1%	
Pendle	Andrew Stephenson	Leave	12.3%	North West England	36.8%	63.2%	
West Suffolk	Matt Hancock	Remain	30.4%	East of England	36.8%	63.2%	
Waveney	Peter Aldous	Remain	4.6%	East of England	36.8%	63.2%	
East Yorkshire	Greg Knight	Leave	29.9%	Yorkshire and the Humber	36.7%	63.3%	
Erewash	Maggie Throup	Remain	7.4%	East Midlands	36.7%	63.3%	
Bolton South East	Yasmin Qureshi	Remain	26.8%	North West England	36.6%	63.4%	
Leigh	Andy Burnham	Remain	31.2%	North West England	36.6%	63.4%	
Bradford South	Judith Cummins	Remain	17.2%	Yorkshire and the Humber	36.5%	63.5%	
Gillingham and Rainham	Rehman Chishti	Leave	22.4%	South East England	36.5%	63.5%	
Portsmouth North	Penny Mordaunt	Leave	23.2%	South East England	36.4%	63.6%	
Stourbridge	Margot James	Remain	14.5%	West Midlands	36.4%	63.6%	
Rochester and Strood	Kelly Tolhurst	Remain	13.6%	South East England	36.3%	63.7%	
Sherwood	Mark Spencer	Remain	9.2%	East Midlands	36.3%	63.7%	
Nottingham North	Graham Allen	Remain	33.6%	East Midlands	36.2%	63.8%	
Dartford	Gareth Johnson	Leave	23.6%	South East England	36.0%	64.0%	
Bognor Regis and Littlehampton	Nick Gibb	Remain	29.6%	South East England	35.8%	64.2%	
Staffordshire Moorlands	Karen Bradley	Remain	23.9%	West Midlands	35.5%	64.5%	
Burton	Andrew Griffiths	Remain	22.8%	West Midlands	35.4%	64.6%	
Chatham and Aylesford	Tracey Crouch	Unknown	26.6%	South East England	35.3%	64.7%	
Nuneaton	Marcus Jones	Remain	10.7%	West Midlands	35.3%	64.7%	
North Thanet	Roger Gale	Remain	23.3%	South East England	35.1%	64.9%	
Bexleyheath and Crayford	David Evennett	Remain	21.3%	Greater London	35.0%	65.0%	
Makerfield	Yvonne Fovargue	Remain	29.4%	North West England	35.0%	65.0%	
Middlesbrough South and East Cleveland	Tom Blenkinsop	Remain	5.0%	North East England	35.0%	65.0%	
Stoke-on-Trent Central	Tristram Hunt	Remain	12.4%	West Midlands	35.0%	65.0%	
South Staffordshire	Gavin Williamson	Remain	41.1%	West Midlands	34.8%	65.2%	
Amber Valley	Nigel Mills	Leave	9.2%	East Midlands	34.7%	65.3%	
Gravesham	Adam Holloway	Leave	16.7%	South East England	34.6%	65.4%	
Hyndburn	Graham Jones	Remain	10.3%	North West England	34.3%	65.7%	
Sittingbourne and Sheppey	Gordon Henderson	Leave	24.6%	South East England	34.3%	65.7%	
Broxbourne	Charles Walker	Leave	36.3%	East of England	34.2%	65.8%	
Middlesbrough	Andy McDonald	Remain	38.1%	North East England	34.0%	66.0%	
Tamworth	Christopher Pincher	Leave	24.0%	West Midlands	34.0%	66.0%	
North West Norfolk	Henry Bellingham	Leave	29.4%	East of England	33.9%	66.1%	
Brigg and Goole	Andrew Percy	Leave	25.8%	Yorkshire and the Humber	33.8%	66.2%	
South West Norfolk	Liz Truss	Remain	27.7%	East of England	33.8%	66.2%	
Doncaster Central	Rosie Winterton	Remain	25.0%	Yorkshire and the Humber	33.7%	66.3%	
Halesowen and Rowley Regis	James Morris	Remain	7.0%	West Midlands	33.7%	66.3%	
Plymouth Moor View	Johnny Mercer	Remain	2.4%	South West England	33.6%	66.4%	
Sheffield South East	Clive Betts	Remain	29.5%	Yorkshire and the Humber	33.6%	66.4%	
Easington	Grahame Morris	Remain	42.3%	North East England	33.5%	66.5%	
Stockton North	Alex Cunningham	Remain	21.1%	North East England	33.5%	66.5%	
Burnley	Julie Cooper	Remain	8.2%	North West England	33.4%	66.6%	
Rother Valley	Kevin Barron	Remain	15.5%	Yorkshire and the Humber	33.3%	66.7%	
Blackpool North and Cleveleys	Paul Maynard	Leave	8.5%	North West England	33.2%	66.8%	
Basildon and Billericay	John Baron	Leave	29.0%	East of England	33.1%	66.9%	
Telford	Lucy Allan	Leave	1.8%	West Midlands	33.0%	67.0%	
Redcar	Anna Turley	Remain	25.4%	North East England	32.5%	67.5%	
West Bromwich East	Tom Watson	Remain	25.3%	West Midlands	32.5%	67.5%	
North Warwickshire	Craig Tracey	Leave	6.3%	West Midlands	32.3%	67.7%	
Wolverhampton North East	Emma Reynolds	Remain	16.2%	West Midlands	32.3%	67.7%	
Aldridge-Brownhills	Wendy Morton	Remain	29.7%	West Midlands	32.2%	67.8%	
Blackpool South	Gordon Marsden	Remain	8.0%	North West England	32.2%	67.8%	
Kingston upon Hull West and Hessle	Alan Johnson	Remain	29.3%	Yorkshire and the Humber	32.2%	67.8%	
Rayleigh and Wickford	Mark Francois	Leave	32.4%	East of England	32.2%	67.8%	
Harlow	Robert Halfon	Remain	18.9%	East of England	32.0%	68.0%	
Hemsworth	Jon Trickett	Remain	28.5%	Yorkshire and the Humber	31.9%	68.1%	
Wolverhampton South East	Pat McFadden	Remain	31.0%	West Midlands	31.8%	68.2%	
Barnsley Central	Dan Jarvis	Remain	34.0%	Yorkshire and the Humber	31.7%	68.3%	
Bassetlaw	John Mann	Leave	17.9%	East Midlands	31.7%	68.3%	
Rotherham	Sarah Champion	Remain	22.3%	Yorkshire and the Humber	31.7%	68.3%	
Cleethorpes	Martin Vickers	Leave	17.5%	Yorkshire and the Humber	31.6%	68.4%	
Don Valley	Caroline Flint	Remain	20.9%	Yorkshire and the Humber	31.5%	68.5%	
Cannock Chase	Amanda Milling	Remain	10.5%	West Midlands	31.1%	68.9%	
Wentworth and Dearne	John Healey	Remain	32.0%	Yorkshire and the Humber	31.1%	68.9%	
Scunthorpe	Nic Dakin	Remain	8.5%	Yorkshire and the Humber	31.0%	69.0%	
West Bromwich West	Adrian Bailey	Remain	22.1%	West Midlands	30.9%	69.1%	
Romford	Andrew Rosindell	Leave	28.2%	Greater London	30.8%	69.2%	
Normanton, Pontefract and Castleford	Yvette Cooper	Remain	33.6%	Yorkshire and the Humber	30.7%	69.3%	
Hornchurch and Upminster	Angela Watkinson	Remain	23.7%	Greater London	30.6%	69.4%	
Louth and Horncastle	Victoria Atkins	Remain	29.8%	East Midlands	30.6%	69.4%	
North East Cambridgeshire	Steve Barclay	Leave	32.6%	East of England	30.6%	69.4%	
Hartlepool	Iain Wright	Remain	7.7%	North East England	30.4%	69.6%	
Dagenham and Rainham	Jon Cruddas	Remain	11.6%	Greater London	30.1%	69.9%	
Clacton	Douglas Carswell	Leave	7.8%	East of England	30.0%	70.0%	
Bolsover	Dennis Skinner	Leave	26.8%	East Midlands	29.8%	70.2%	
Thurrock	Jackie Doyle-Price	Remain	1.1%	East of England	29.8%	70.2%	
Dudley South	Mike Wood	Leave	11.2%	West Midlands	29.6%	70.4%	
Ashfield	Gloria De Piero	Remain	18.6%	East Midlands	29.5%	70.5%	
Barnsley East	Michael Dugher	Remain	31.2%	Yorkshire and the Humber	29.3%	70.7%	
Stoke-on-Trent South	Rob Flello	Remain	6.5%	West Midlands	29.2%	70.8%	
Mansfield	Alan Meale	Remain	11.3%	East Midlands	29.1%	70.9%	
South Holland and the Deepings	John Hayes	Leave	37.7%	East Midlands	28.9%	71.1%	
Dudley North	Ian Austin	Remain	11.0%	West Midlands	28.6%	71.4%	
Great Grimsby	Melanie Onn	Remain	13.5%	Yorkshire and the Humber	28.6%	71.4%	
Great Yarmouth	Brandon Lewis	Remain	13.8%	East of England	28.5%	71.5%	
Doncaster North	Ed Miliband	Remain	29.8%	Yorkshire and the Humber	28.0%	72.0%	
Stoke-on-Trent North	Ruth Smeeth	Remain	12.5%	West Midlands	27.9%	72.1%	
Kingston upon Hull East	Karl Turner	Remain	29.4%	Yorkshire and the Humber	27.4%	72.6%	
Castle Point	Rebecca Harris	Leave	19.7%	East of England	27.3%	72.7%	
South Basildon and East Thurrock	Stephen Metcalfe	Leave	16.9%	East of England	27.0%	73.0%	
Walsall North	David Winnick	Remain	5.2%	West Midlands	25.8%	74.2%	
Boston and Skegness	Matt Warman	Remain	10.0%	East Midlands	25.1%	74.9%	

=== Northern Ireland ===
See here for the official results announced by constituency.

== See also ==
Comparison of results in 1975 and 2016 referendums

- European Union Referendum Act 2015
- European Communities Act 1972 (UK)
- 1975 United Kingdom European Communities membership referendum
- Results of the 1975 United Kingdom European Communities membership referendum
- Referendum Act 1975
- European Union (Amendment) Act 2008
- European Union Act 2011
- 2015–2016 United Kingdom renegotiation of European Union membership
- European Union (Notification of Withdrawal) Act 2017
- European Union (Withdrawal) Act 2018
