= Minister of State for Social Care =

Ministerial position in the British Government

United Kingdom Minister of State for Social Care
- Royal Arms of His Majesty's Government

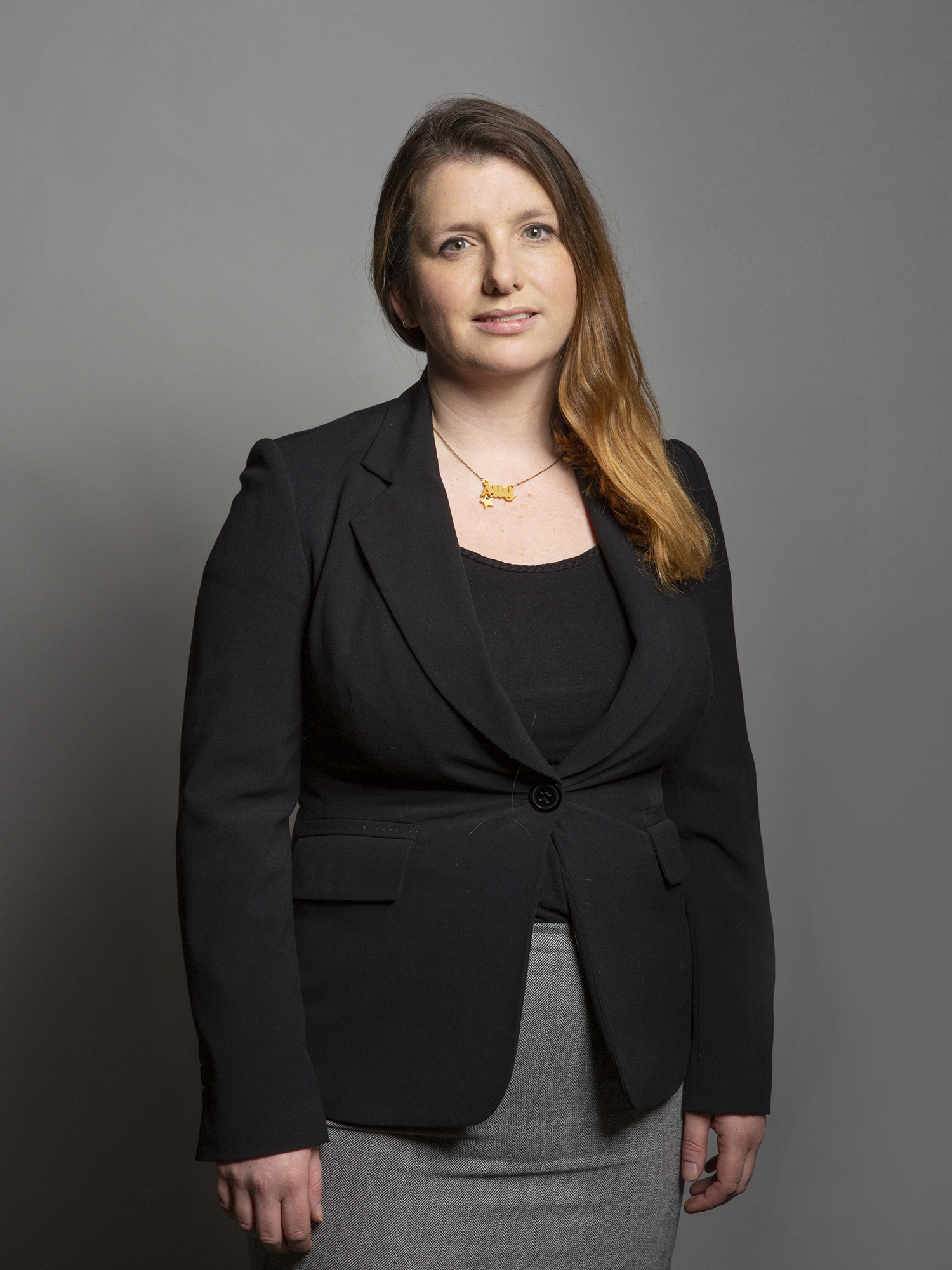
- Incumbent; Alison McGovern since 21 July 2026
- Department of Health and Social Care
- Style: Minister
- Nominator: Prime Minister of the United Kingdom
- Appointer: The Monarch; on advice of the Prime Minister
- Term length: At His Majesty's pleasure
- Website: www.gov.uk/government/ministers/minister-of-state--238

The Minister of State for Social Care is a mid-level position in the Department of Health and Social Care in the British government. The minister is in charge of social care in England.

== History ==
In the 1960s, the role was known as Minister of State for Social Services in the Department of Social Security.

The position was created in 2006, with Ivan Lewis being made Minister of State for Care Services.

After the Conservative victory in the 2015 United Kingdom general election Alistair Burt returned to Government as Minister of State for Care and Support in the Department of Health. In July 2016, Burt announced that he would be resigning from his Ministerial position, "Twenty-four years and one month ago, I answered my first question as a junior minister in oral questions and I’ve just completed my last oral questions," Burt said. It was made clear that his resignation was not related to Brexit.

The position was given to David Mowat and renamed as Parliamentary Under-Secretary of State for Care and Support. David Mowat lost his Warrington South seat in the snap 2017 general election. He was not replaced until 2018 when Prime Minister Theresa May appointed Caroline Dinenage as the new Minister of Care. Dinenage stayed in her role when Boris Johnson became Prime Minister and served in the First Johnson ministry and into the Second Johnson ministry.

As part of the 2020 British cabinet reshuffle, a number of junior ministers were moved around. Dinenage was made the new Minister of State for Digital and Culture. Helen Whately was her replacement. Helen Whatley has been in charge of government response to social care during the COVID-19 pandemic in the United Kingdom, particularly in reference to vaccination deployment.

== Responsibilities ==
The Minister of State for Social Care leads on the following:

- adult social care:
  - winter planning for adult social care
  - funding and markets (charging reform)
  - quality (system reform)
  - workforce
- integration, including discharge
- community health services
- major diseases:
  - cancer
  - diabetes
  - strokes
- rare diseases
- screening
- dementia
- end-of-life care
- COVID-19 vaccine licensing
- long-term conditions

== Minister of State for Social Care ==
Name	Portrait	Took office	Left office	Political party	Prime Minister
Minister of State for Social Services
Stephen Swingler MP for Newcastle-under-Lyme		1 November 1968	19 February 1969	Labour	Harold Wilson
David Ennals MP for Dover		1 November 1968	19 June 1970	Labour	Harold Wilson
Baroness Serota		25 February 1969	19 June 1970	Labour	Harold Wilson
Minister of State for Care Services
Ivan Lewis MP for Bury South		15 May 2006	3 October 2008	Labour	Tony Blair; Gordon Brown
Phil Hope MP for Corby		5 October 2008	11 May 2010	Labour	Gordon Brown
Paul Burstow MP for Sutton and Cheam		11 May 2010	4 September 2012	Liberal Democrat	David Cameron
Minister of State for Care and Support
Norman Lamb MP for North Norfolk		4 September 2012	8 May 2015	Liberal Democrat	David Cameron
Minister of State for Community and Social Care
Alistair Burt MP for North East Bedfordshire		11 May 2015	15 July 2016	Conservative	David Cameron
Parliamentary Under-Secretary of State for Care and Support
David Mowat MP for Warrington South		14 July 2016	9 June 2017	Conservative	Theresa May
Minister of State for Social Care
Caroline Dinenage MP for Gosport		9 January 2018	13 February 2020	Conservative	Theresa May; Boris Johnson
Helen Whately MP for Faversham and Mid Kent		13 February 2020	16 September 2021	Conservative	Boris Johnson
Minister of State for Care and Mental Health
Gillian Keegan MP for Chichester		16 September 2021	8 September 2022	Conservative	Boris Johnson
Minister of State for Health and Social Care
Robert Jenrick MP for Newark		7 September 2022	25 October 2022	Conservative	Liz Truss
Minister of State for Social Care
Helen Whately MP for Faversham and Mid Kent		26 October 2022	5 July 2024	Conservative	Rishi Sunak
Minister of State for Care
Stephen Kinnock MP for Aberafan Maesteg		8 July 2024	20 July 2026	Labour	Keir Starmer
Minister of State for Social Care
Alison McGovern MP for Birkenhead		21 July 2026	Incumbent	Labour	Andy Burnham

== See also ==
- Health minister
