= Helen Southworth =

British politician

Member of Parliament for Warrington South
- In office 1 May 1997 – 12 April 2010
- Preceded by: Mike Hall
- Succeeded by: David Mowat

Personal details
- Born: 13 November 1956 (age 69) Preston, Lancashire, England
- Party: Labour
- Spouse: Edmund Southworth
- Education: Lancaster University

Helen Mary Southworth (born 13 November 1956) is a former Labour Party politician in the United Kingdom who is the Chief Executive of Age Concern Isle of Man. She is the former Member of Parliament (MP) for Warrington South, and was first elected at the 1997 general election. She retained the Warrington South seat at the 2001 and 2005 general elections, each time with a reduced majority. On 15 June 2009, she announced that she would be retiring at the next general election. The seat that she vacated was subsequently won for the Conservative Party by David Mowat. She was the only person to have won successive elections in the constituency until Mowat retained the seat at the 2015 general election with an increased majority.

== Early life ==
Born in Preston, Southworth was educated at the former Larkhill Convent Grammar School (now called Cardinal Newman College, a sixth form college) on Larkhill Road in Frenchwood, Preston. In 1978, she graduated with a BA in English literature from Lancaster University.

Before entering Parliament, Southworth was a councillor on St Helens Borough Council, on which she became chairperson of the Leisure Committee. She unsuccessfully contested the Wirral South constituency at the 1992 general election. Southworth was a Director at Age Concern in St Helens.

== Parliamentary career ==
Southworth served as a member of the House of Commons select committees on Trade and Industry (1998–2001) and Procedure (1997–1999). She was Parliamentary Private Secretary to Paul Boateng, the former Chief Secretary to the Treasury, from 2001 to 2005. In 2005 she was appointed a member of the Culture, Media and Sport select committee, which scrutinised the implementation of the London 2012 Olympic Games.

She has served as a non-executive director on a number of bodies, including the charity Age Concern, Grosvenor Housing association and Merseyside and Knowsley Health Authority.

At Dods Women in Public Life Awards in 2008 Southworth was named MP of the year for her work involving missing and runaway children.

On 16 June 2009, Southworth announced her intention to stand down at the next general election, citing her desire to spend more time with her family.

== Isle of Man ==
After completing her term as an MP, Southworth moved with her husband to the Isle of Man. In 2014 she became CEO of Age Isle of Man having previously been CEO of Age Concern in St Helens for thirteen years before she stepped down in 2010.

== Personal life ==
She is the sister of science writer Gabrielle Walker, well known for her radio shows on BBC Radio 4 and also her Antarctic studies. She married Edmund Southworth, who graduated from Lancaster University in 1977 where he studied archaeology. Her husband has been on the North West Committee of the Heritage Lottery Fund and was the County Museums Officer for Lancashire County Council from 2001. He became Director of Manx National Heritage in 2009 and retired in 2021.

Parliament of the United Kingdom
Preceded by Mike Hall	Member of Parliament for Warrington South; 1997–2010	Succeeded by David Mowat
