= Andy Carter (politician) =

Ex British Conservative politician

Andy Carter JP
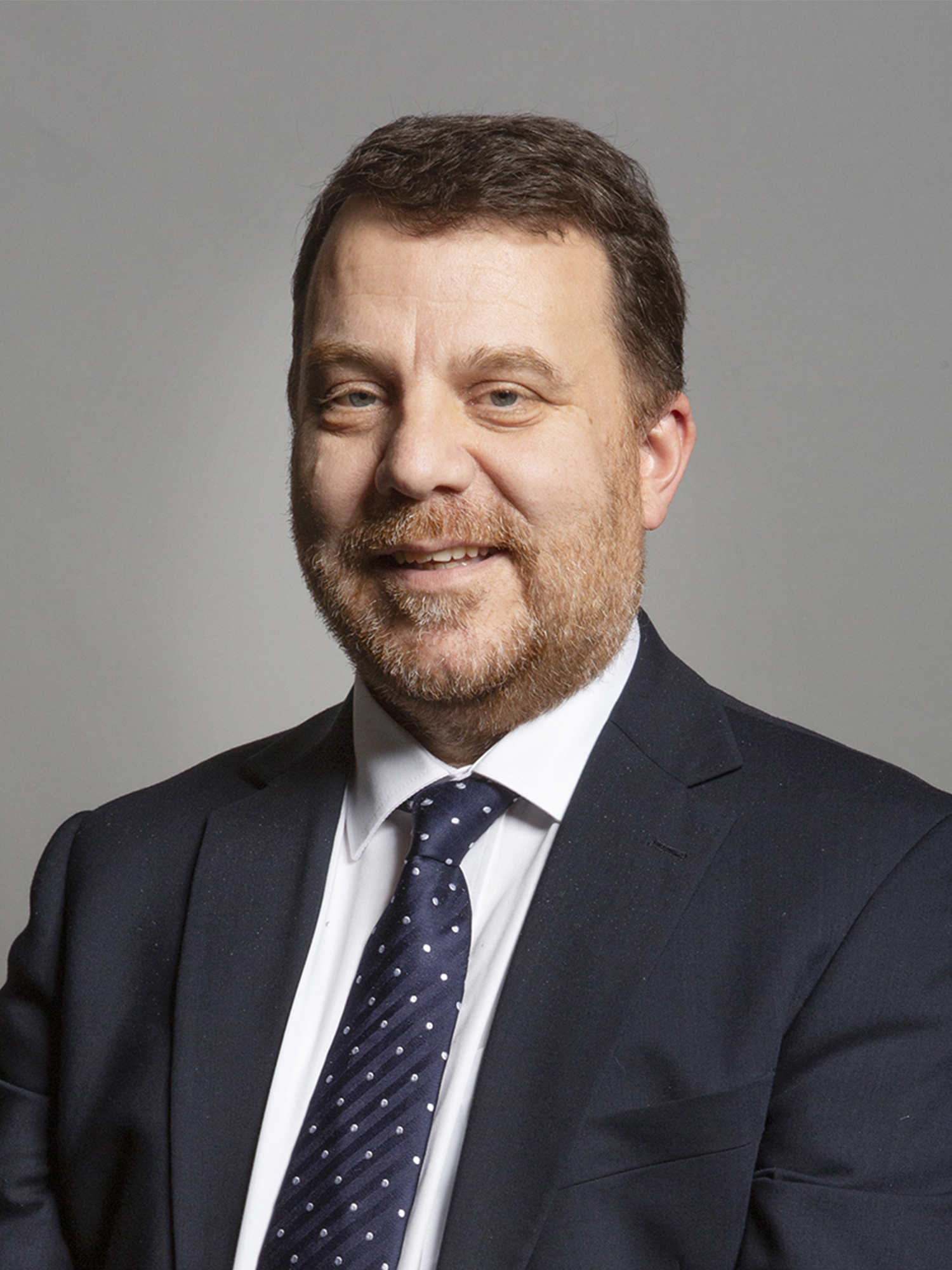
- Official portrait, 2019

Member of Parliament for Warrington South
- In office 12 December 2019 – 30 May 2024
- Preceded by: Faisal Rashid
- Succeeded by: Sarah Hall

Personal details
- Born: 25 January 1974 (age 52)
- Party: Conservative
- Children: 1
- Education: Worksop College; University of Leicester; University of Pennsylvania
- Occupation: Politician

Andrew John Carter (born 25 January 1974) is a British Conservative Party politician who was the Member of Parliament (MP) for Warrington South from 2019 to 2024.

== Early life and career ==
Andy Carter was born on 25 January 1974. He was privately educated at Worksop College. He went on to study Economics at the University of Leicester. In 2011 he attended Wharton School of the University of Pennsylvania in the United States.

Carter was group managing director of Manchester-based GMG Radio before the group was taken over by Global Radio in 2014. After leaving radio he worked in a family business and ran a consultancy firm.

== Parliamentary career ==
In March 2019 Carter was selected as the Conservative candidate for Warrington South in March 2019. At the 2019 general election, Carter was elected to Parliament as MP for Warrington South with 45.5% of the vote and a majority of 2,010.

In May 2023, Carter announced that he would not seek re-election as MP for Warrington South at the next general election. Carter subsequently attempted to become the Conservative candidate to stand for Parliament in the Fylde constituency, but lost to Andrew Snowden. In June 2024 he announced that he had changed his mind about standing in Warrington, and was re-selected as the Conservative candidate for Warrington South ahead of the 2024 general election. He lost his seat to Labour's Sarah Hall in the election.

== Personal life ==
Carter lives in Lymm with his wife, Aggie, and a son, Harry. He is a volunteer magistrate.

Parliament of the United Kingdom
Preceded by Faisal Rashid	Member of Parliament for Warrington South; 2019–2024	Succeeded by To Be Elected
