= Caroline Dinenage =

British politician (born 1971)

Dame Caroline Dinenage DBE MP
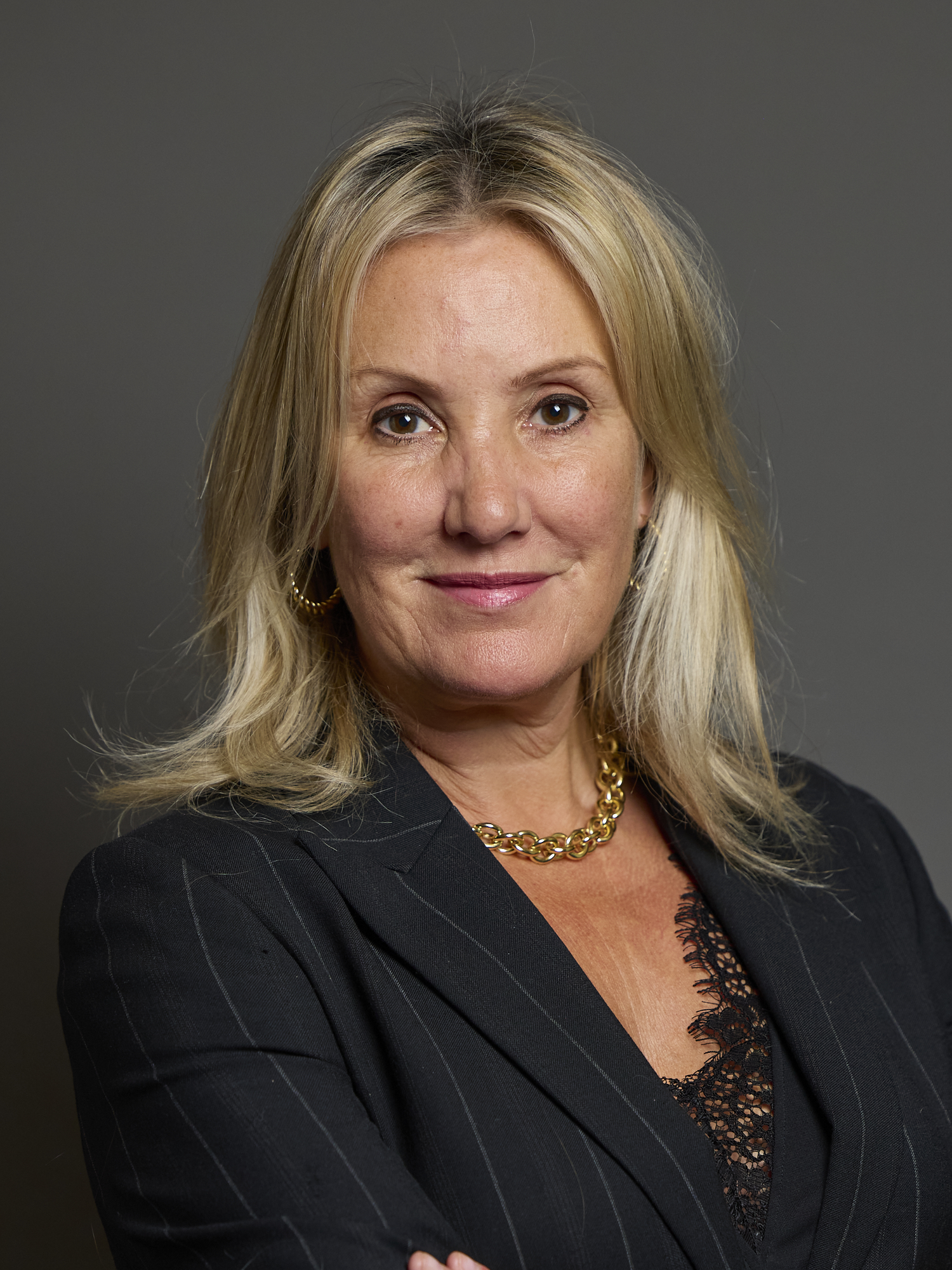
- Official portrait, 2024

Chair of the Culture, Media and Sport Committee
- Incumbent
- Assumed office 17 May 2023
- Preceded by: Damian Green (acting)

Minister of State for Digital and Culture
- In office 13 February 2020 – 15 September 2021
- Prime Minister: Boris Johnson
- Preceded by: Nigel Adams
- Succeeded by: The Lord Parkinson of Whitley Bay

Minister of State for Social Care
- In office 9 January 2018 – 13 February 2020
- Prime Minister: Theresa May; Boris Johnson
- Preceded by: David Mowat
- Succeeded by: Helen Whately

Parliamentary Under-Secretary of State for Family Support, Housing and Child Maintenance
- In office 14 June 2017 – 9 January 2018
- Prime Minister: Theresa May
- Preceded by: Caroline Nokes
- Succeeded by: Kit Malthouse

Parliamentary Under-Secretary of State for Family Justice
- In office 8 May 2015 – 16 July 2016#
- Prime Minister: David Cameron
- Preceded by: Position established
- Succeeded by: Phillip Lee

Parliamentary Under-Secretary of State for Women, Equalities and Early Years
- In office 8 May 2015 – 14 June 2017
- Prime Minister: David Cameron; Theresa May
- Preceded by: Office established
- Succeeded by: Office abolished

Member of Parliament for Gosport
- Incumbent
- Assumed office 6 May 2010
- Preceded by: Peter Viggers
- Majority: 6,066 (13.7%)

Personal details
- Born: Caroline Julia Dinenage; 28 October 1971 (age 55) Portsmouth, Hampshire, England
- Party: Conservative
- Spouses: Carlos E. Garreta (m. 2002; div. 2012); The Baron Lancaster of Kimbolton (m. 2014)
- Children: 2
- Parents: Fred Dinenage; Beverley Summers
- Education: Swansea University (BA)
- Website: caroline4gosport.co.uk

Dame Caroline Julia Dinenage (born 28 October 1971) is a British Conservative politician who has been the Member of Parliament (MP) for Gosport since 2010.

== Early life and career ==
Caroline Dinenage was born on 28 October 1971 in Portsmouth, the daughter of television presenter Fred Dinenage and Beverley Summers.

She attended Wykeham House School, a private school for girls in Fareham, then Oaklands RC Comprehensive School, Waterlooville, before studying Politics and English at Swansea University.

Dinenage established her first manufacturing company at the age of 19, and was a director/company secretary of Dinenages Ltd for 20 years.

In May 1998 she was elected as the youngest member in Winchester District Council.

== Parliamentary career ==
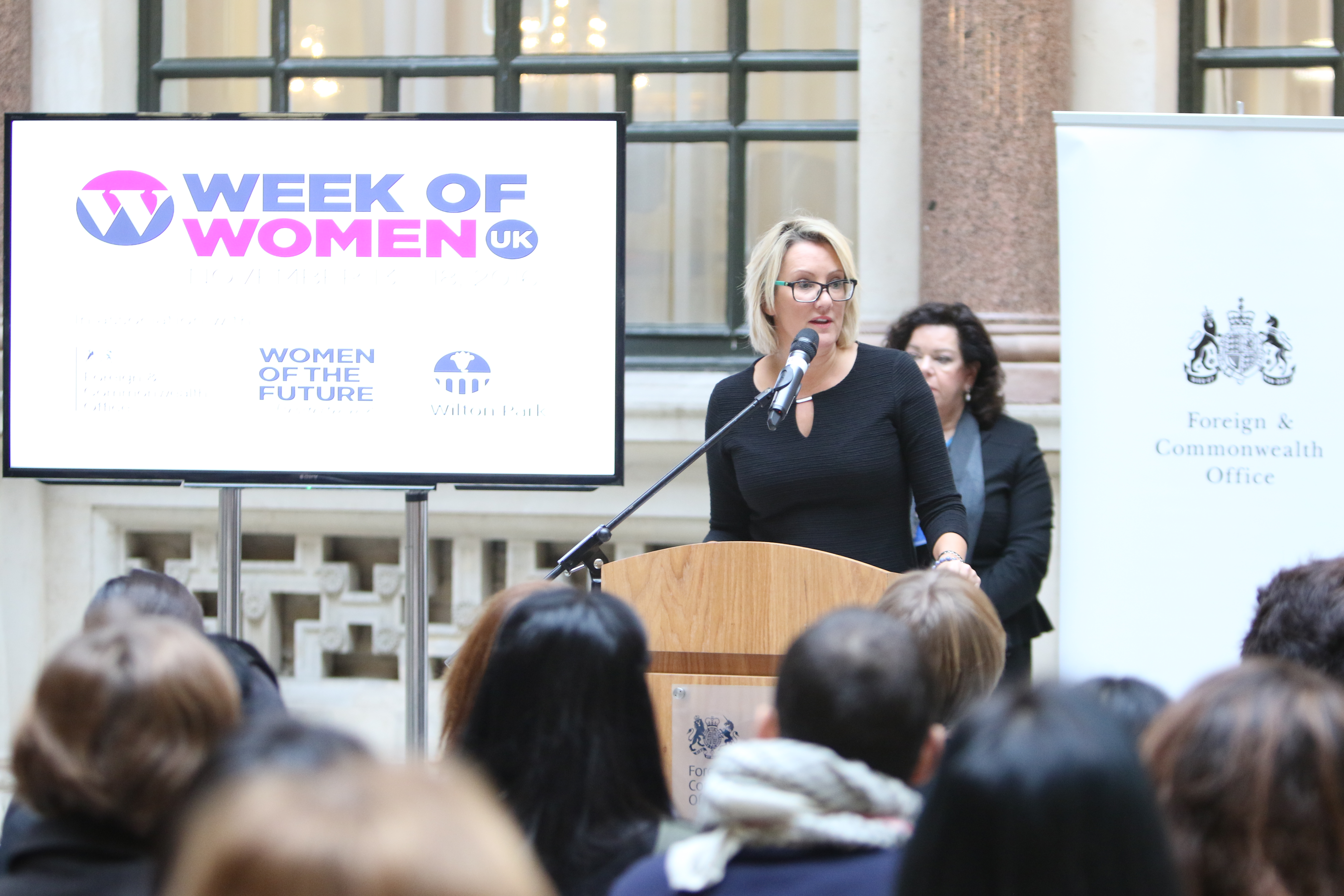
Dinenage speaking at the Week of Women panel discussion in 2016 alongside Karen Pierce

Dinenage stood as the Conservative candidate in Portsmouth South at the 2005 general election, coming second with 33.5% of the vote behind the incumbent Liberal Democrat MP Mike Hancock.

=== 1st term (2010–2015) ===
At the 2010 general election, Dinenage was elected to Parliament as MP for Gosport with 51.8% of the vote and a majority of 14,413.

Dinenage worked with local partners to secure Enterprise Zone status for the Daedalus disused military airfield at Lee-on-the-Solent in August 2011.

Dinenage sat on the Business, Innovation and Skills Select Committee 2012–2015.

Dinenage successfully campaigned for a medal for the veterans of the Arctic convoys of World War II. She served as the vice-chair (Royal Navy) of the All Party Parliamentary Group for Armed Forces 2010–2014, and was a UK delegate to the NATO Parliamentary Assembly and vice-chair of the NATO Science and Technology Sub-Committee.

Dinenage has campaigned for local road improvements in 2013, helping in May 2019 to secure £25.7m Government funding for the Stubbington Bypass, which has now been completed.

=== 2nd term (2015–2017) ===
At the 2015 general election, Dinenage was re-elected as MP for Gosport with an increased vote share of 55.3% and an increased majority of 17,098.

In August 2016, Campaign group Action 4 Ashes praised Dinenage for her swift action as Justice Minister in introducing important changes to cremation regulation.

=== 3rd term (2017–2019) ===
Dinenage was again re-elected at the snap 2017 general election with an increased vote share of 61.9% and an increased majority of 17,211.

In January 2018, Dinenage was appointed as Minister of State for Care at the Department for Health & Social Care. Dinenage was the first minister since Alistair Burt to hold the social care portfolio at Minister of State level, after Theresa May handed the portfolio to a Parliamentary Under-Secretary of State under David Mowat and Jackie Doyle-Price. Dinenage's appointment was welcomed by learning disabilities charity Hft, who had campaigned for the restoration of the Minister of State role.

In June 2018, Dinenage launched the Carers Action Plan to support unpaid carers in England.

Following her campaign against proposals which would have seen the closure of the Royal Navy School of Engineering at HMS Sultan, in February 2019 the government indefinitely delayed the closure of the site.

In November 2019, she introduced plans for making learning disability and autism training mandatory for all Health and Social Care professionals.

=== 4th term (2019–2024) ===
At the 2019 general election, Dinenage was again re-elected with an increased vote share of 66.5% and an increased majority of 23,278.

In August 2020, Dinenage launched a consultation on Changing Places toilets: the resulting building regulation changes would ensure larger accessible toilets were added to more than 150 major buildings a year.

Dinenage had ministerial responsibility for the Online Safety Bill, which was published in draft form in November 2021.

As Education Minister, in November 2021 she delivered the government's manifesto commitment of 30 hours' free childcare for 3- and 4-year-olds.

On 7 August 2023, The Guardian reported that Dinenage, chair of the select committee that scrutinises the British television industry, had recently hosted a drinks event in Parliament for the news channel GB News.

On 20 September 2023, after allegations of sexual misconduct had been made against Russell Brand, Dinenage wrote to the social media platform Rumble on a House of Commons letterhead, expressing her committee's concern that "he [Brand] may be able to profit from his content on the platform", and enquiring "whether Rumble intends to join YouTube in suspending Mr Brand's ability to earn money on the platform". Rumble issued a response on X, expressing their support for "a free internet" and rejecting what they saw as "the UK Parliament's demands", adding that it was "deeply inappropriate and dangerous that the UK Parliament would attempt to control who is allowed to speak on our platform or to earn a living from doing so".

=== 5th term (2024–) ===
Dinenage was again re-elected at the 2024 general election, with a decreased vote share of 40.3% and a decreased majority of 6,066. In November 2024, Dinenage voted for the Terminally Ill Adults (End of Life) Bill.

== Personal life ==
Dinenage had two children with her first husband Carlos Garreta, a Royal Navy officer. In February 2014, she married Lieutenant Colonel Mark Lancaster, then an MP who was later created, in September 2020, a life peer and member of the House of Lords as the Baron Lancaster of Kimbolton; this gave Dinenage the title Lady Lancaster of Kimbolton, although she does not use this title professionally.

She has made a parachute jump and abseiled off Portsmouth's Spinnaker Tower to raise funds for the MS Society. A patron of Conservatives against Fox Hunting, she was named one of Queen guitarist and animal welfare campaigner Brian May's Heroes of 2010.

Dineage is chair of the board of LNT Care Developments Limited, one of the UK's leading care home builders, and part of the LNT Group owned by Lawrence Tomlinson.

== Honours ==
Dinenage was appointed Dame Commander of the Order of the British Empire (DBE) in the 2022 Political Honours.

Parliament of the United Kingdom
Preceded by Peter Viggers	Member of Parliament for Gosport; 2010–present	Incumbent
Political offices
Position established	Parliamentary Under-Secretary of State for Women, Equalities and Early Years; 2015–2017	Position abolished
Preceded by Caroline Nokes	Parliamentary Under-Secretary of State for Family Support, Housing and Child Maintenance; 2017–2018	Succeeded by Kit Malthouse
Preceded by Philip Dunne	Minister of State for Social Care; 2018–2020	Succeeded by Helen Whately
Preceded by Nigel Adams	Minister of State for Digital and Culture; 2020–2021	Succeeded by Stephen Parkinson
