= Faisal Rashid =

British politician (born 1972)

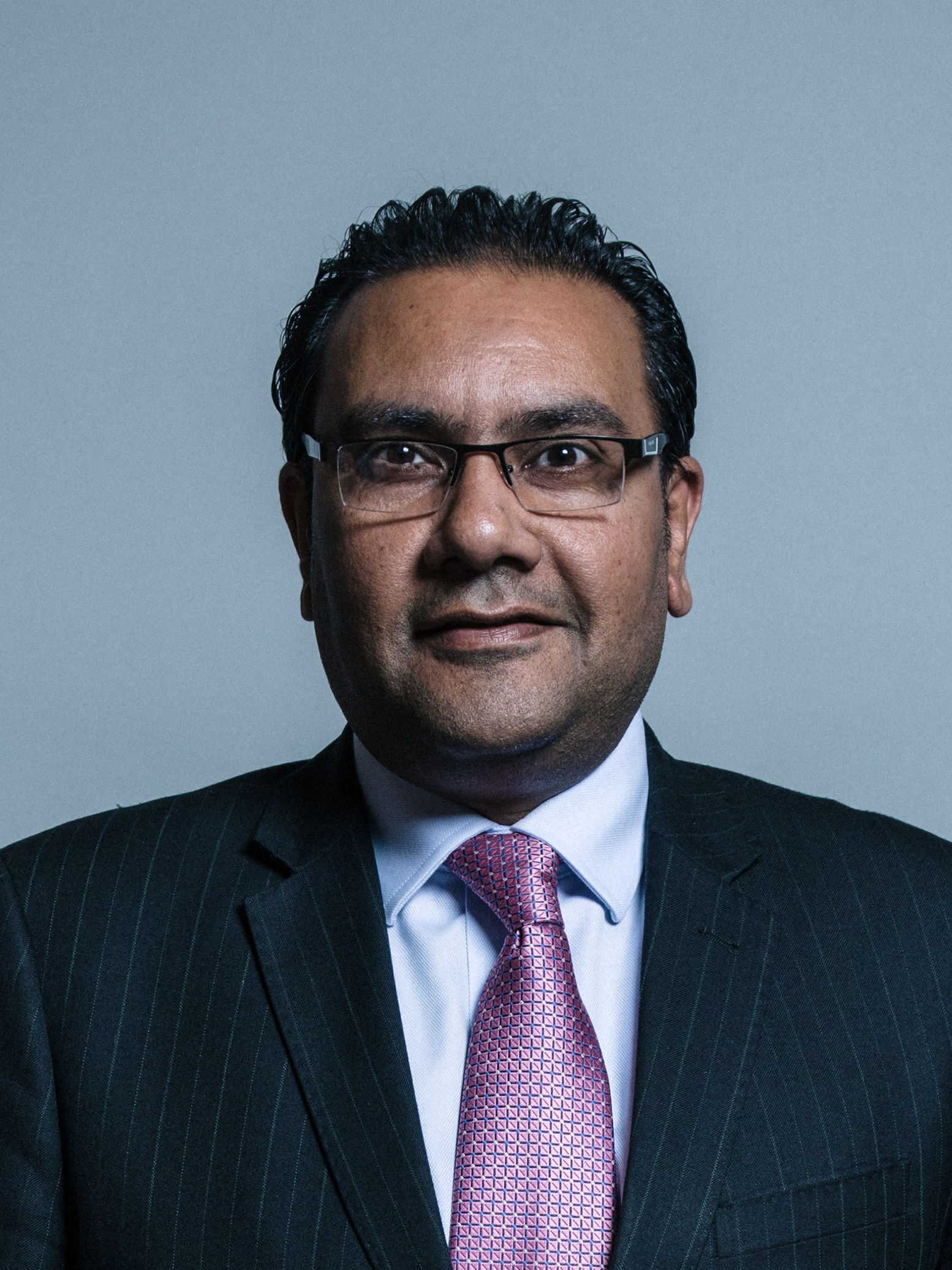
- Official portrait, 2017

Member of Parliament for Warrington South
- In office 8 June 2017 – 6 November 2019
- Preceded by: David Mowat
- Succeeded by: Andy Carter

Mayor of Warrington
- In office 23 May 2016 – 22 May 2017
- Preceded by: Geoff Settle
- Succeeded by: Les Morgan

Member of Warrington Borough Council
- In office 6 May 2016 – 31 August 2017
- Ward: Chapelford & Old Hall
- Preceded by: Ward established
- Succeeded by: Paul Warburton
- In office 5 May 2011 – 5 May 2016
- Ward: Whittle Hall
- Preceded by: Judith Wheeler
- Succeeded by: Ward abolished

Personal details
- Born: 1972 (age 53–54)
- Party: Labour

Faisal Rashid (born 1972) is a former British Labour politician who served as the Member of Parliament (MP) for Warrington South from 2017 to 2019.

== Early life and career ==
Rashid was educated at the National College of Business Administration and Economics in Lahore. He has worked as a manager at HBOS and NatWest Bank.

Rashid served as a Member of Warrington Borough Council from 2011 until 2017, resigning following his election to Parliament. He was the first Muslim Mayor of Warrington, serving from May 2016 to May 2017.

== Parliamentary career ==
Rashid was elected as the MP for Warrington South at the 2017 general election, defeating incumbent Conservative and then government minister David Mowat.

In May 2018, Rashid apologised over a tweet which critics suggested was encouraging voters to vote more than once. Rashid said the well-known and jocular phrase "vote early, vote often, vote Labour", was sent by a member of staff.

In October 2018, it was reported that Rashid had been on five overseas trips, worth almost £10,000 in total, since his election. The trips were to Pakistani-controlled Kashmir, China, Germany, Qatar and the West Bank and Israel and the cost met by NGOs, companies or overseas governments. Rashid responded that "These trips are largely educational in purpose. The opportunity to meet with individuals on the ground provides invaluable opportunities for learning and understanding. On occasions, the trips have also focused on enabling MPs to support British businesses abroad and on advancing bilateral relations. These are key aspects of a member of Parliament’s role, especially as the UK looks to redefine its position in the world post-Brexit." Rashid sat on the Parliamentary International Trade Select Committee and the Committees on Arms Export Controls.

In June 2019, Rashid urged Warrington Borough Council to declare a climate emergency.

While Warrington voted to Leave the EU in 2016, Rashid supported a second referendum on Britain's EU membership and would have campaigned for Remain.

Rashid lost his seat at the 2019 general election to the Conservative candidate Andy Carter.

== Post-parliamentary career ==
After his departure from parliament, Rashid established a finance company, Westminster Finance Limited.

In May 2021, he was stood again for Warrington Borough Council in the ward Rixton & Woolston. He was unsuccessful in this election.

In July 2021, he was elected chair of the Warrington South Constituency Labour Party.

Parliament of the United Kingdom
Preceded by David Mowat	Member of Parliament for Warrington South; 2017–2019	Succeeded by Andy Carter
