= Helen Whately =

British politician (born 1976)

Helen Whately MP
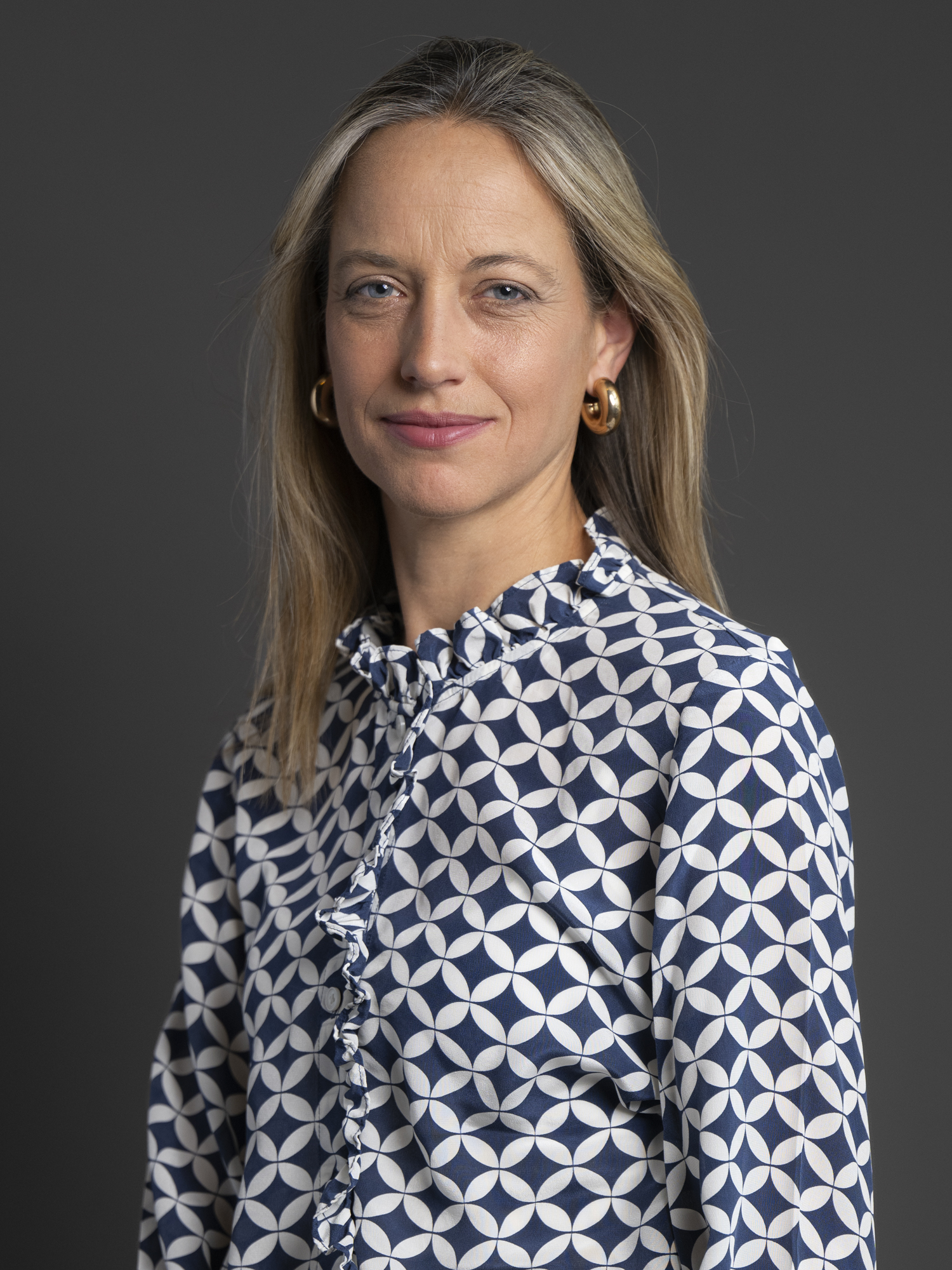
- Official portrait, 2024

Shadow Secretary of State for Work and Pensions
- Incumbent
- Assumed office 5 November 2024
- Leader: Kemi Badenoch
- Preceded by: Mel Stride

Shadow Secretary of State for Transport
- In office 8 July 2024 – 5 November 2024
- Leader: Rishi Sunak
- Preceded by: Louise Haigh
- Succeeded by: Gareth Bacon

Minister of State for Social Care
- In office 26 October 2022 – 5 July 2024
- Prime Minister: Rishi Sunak
- Preceded by: Robert Jenrick
- Succeeded by: Stephen Kinnock
- In office 13 February 2020 – 16 September 2021
- Prime Minister: Boris Johnson
- Preceded by: Caroline Dinenage
- Succeeded by: Gillian Keegan

Exchequer Secretary to the Treasury
- In office 16 September 2021 – 7 July 2022
- Prime Minister: Boris Johnson
- Preceded by: Kemi Badenoch
- Succeeded by: Alan Mak

Parliamentary Under-Secretary of State for Arts, Heritage and Tourism
- In office 10 September 2019 – 13 February 2020
- Prime Minister: Boris Johnson
- Preceded by: Rebecca Pow
- Succeeded by: Nigel Huddleston

Deputy Chairman of the Conservative Party
- In office 17 April 2019 – 10 September 2019
- Leader: Theresa May; Boris Johnson
- Preceded by: James Cleverly
- Succeeded by: Paul Scully

Member of Parliament for Faversham and Mid Kent
- Incumbent
- Assumed office 7 May 2015
- Preceded by: Hugh Robertson
- Majority: 1,469 (3.2%)

Personal details
- Born: Helen Olivia Bicknell Lightwood; 23 June 1976 (age 50) Norwich, Norfolk, England
- Party: Conservative
- Spouse: Marcus Whately (m. 2005)
- Children: 3
- Education: Lady Margaret Hall, Oxford (BA)
- Website: helenwhately.org.uk

Helen Olivia Bicknell Whately (née Lightwood; born 23 June 1976) is a British Conservative Party politician who has served as Member of Parliament (MP) for Faversham and Mid Kent since 2015 and Shadow Secretary of State for Work and Pensions since November 2024. She was Shadow Secretary of State for Transport from July to November 2024 and Minister of State for Social Care from October 2022 to July 2024, as too previously from 2020 to 2021. She also served as Exchequer Secretary to the Treasury from 2021 to 2022.

Whately was appointed Deputy Chairman of the Conservative Party by Theresa May in 2019, and was retained in the post by new prime minister Boris Johnson. She served as Parliamentary Under-Secretary of State for Arts, Heritage and Tourism from September 2019 to February 2020. In the 2020 Cabinet reshuffle, Johnson moved her to the post of Minister of State for Social Care. Whately was the Social Care Minister during the COVID-19 pandemic in the United Kingdom. In the 2021 Cabinet reshuffle, Johnson moved her to the post of Exchequer Secretary to the Treasury, serving under Chancellor Rishi Sunak. In July 2022, she resigned from office in protest at Johnson's leadership amid a Government crisis. She sat on the backbenches during Liz Truss's tenure as prime minister, before returning to her former role of Social Care Minister in October 2022 under Sunak until the Conservatives' defeat in the 2024 general election. After being appointed Shadow Secretary of State for Transport in Sunak's caretaker shadow cabinet, she was appointed Shadow Secretary of State for Work and Pensions by Kemi Badenoch after her election as Leader of the Conservative Party.

== Early life and career ==
Helen Lightwood was born on 23 June 1976 in Norwich, and grew up near Redhill. Her father, Robin Lightwood FRCS, was a surgeon and her mother, Andrea née Wood, a physician. She was educated at the independent girls school Woldingham School, before entering the sixth form at the private Westminster School in London. During her school years she undertook work experience in hospitals, with the intention of following her parents into a medical career, but Whately commented in her maiden speech as MP that it instead incentivised her to pursue a career in which she could improve healthcare as a whole.

She has said she worked as a waitress, cleaner and receptionist..

After leaving school, she taught English in rural Nepal for a year. Lightwood studied Philosophy, Politics and Economics at Lady Margaret Hall, Oxford, and was a member of debating society the Oxford Union, but she did not have any interest in student politics, later saying that she felt that it "did not seem to be about getting stuff done".

After university, she worked at PwC for two years as a management consultant trainee, before working at AOL, where she was involved in setting up its internet film service. After this she worked as a media policy advisor for the then Shadow Secretary of State for Culture, Media and Sport and Conservative MP Hugo Swire. This experience inspired Whately to pursue a political career. In 2008, British society magazine Tatler selected Whately as one of ten young rising stars of the Conservative Party and tipped her as a future health secretary.

From 2007 to 2015, Whately worked as an engagement manager for the management consultancy firm McKinsey & Company in its healthcare division.

== Parliamentary career ==
Whately was the Conservative candidate for Kingston and Surbiton at the 2010 general election, coming second with 36.5% of the vote behind the incumbent Liberal Democrat MP Ed Davey.

=== 1st term (2015–2017) ===
In February 2015 Whately was selected by the Conservative Party to contest Faversham and Mid Kent in an all-women shortlist. At the 2015 general election, Whately was elected to Parliament as MP for Faversham and Mid Kent with 54.4% of the vote and a majority of 16,652.

Whately made her maiden speech on 2 June, which focused on the National Health Service.

In July 2015, she was elected to sit on the Commons Health Select Committee.

In December 2015, Whately voted in support of Prime Minister David Cameron's plans to carry out airstrikes against ISIL targets in Syria.

Whately supported the United Kingdom remaining in the European Union in the 2016 membership referendum.

In July 2016, Whately was appointed as the Parliamentary Private Secretary (PPS) to the International Trade Minister Greg Hands. In October 2016, she was selected to chair the All-Party Parliamentary Group (APPG) for Mental Health and the APPG for Fruit and Vegetable Farmers.

In February 2017, she voted to support the Government's motion for the invoking of Article 50 to formally start the process of the UK's withdrawal from the EU. Whately explained her decision as honouring the result of the Brexit referendum.

=== 2nd term (2017–2019) ===
Whately was re-elected as MP for Faversham and Mid Kent at the snap 2017 general election with an increased vote share of 61.1% and an increased majority of 17,413.

Following the election she became the PPS to the Secretary of State for Education and Minister for Women and Equalities, Justine Greening. She also became chairwoman of the APPG for Health, and Personalised Medicine and continued to chair the APPG for Mental Health, and Fruit and Vegetable Farmers.

In July 2017, Whately was criticised for accepting several thousand pounds' worth of hospitality from the Saudi Arabian government before going on to defend its record in a parliamentary debate. The debate followed an urgent question by Liberal Democrat MP Tom Brake over fears of the imminent execution of 14 men for protest-related offences, including a number who were children at the time of their alleged offences. Whately had urged parliamentarians to "appreciate that the government of Saudi Arabia is taking to steps to improve their actions on human rights", but was criticised by an Opposition Labour Party MP as a "serial apologist for the régime".

In January 2018, she was appointed as PPS to Brandon Lewis, the Minister without Portfolio and Conservative Party chairman. In July 2018, she became Vice-Chair of the Conservative Party for Women, after Maria Caulfield stood down in protest at the Government's approach to Brexit.

In April 2019, Whately voted for Prime Minister Theresa May's Brexit withdrawal agreement. She also stated her opposition to a referendum on any Brexit withdrawal agreement.

On 17 April, Whately was promoted Deputy Chair of the Conservative Party. On 10 September, she was appointed as Parliamentary Under-Secretary of State for Arts, Heritage and Tourism by Prime Minister Boris Johnson.

=== 3rd term (2019–2024) ===
Whately was again re-elected at the 2019 general election with an increased vote share of 63.2% and an increased majority of 21,976.

In February 2020, Whately joined the Department for Health and Social Care as the Minister of State for Social Care.

Whately was appointed Exchequer Secretary to the Treasury in the 2021 Cabinet reshuffle. She resigned on the morning of 7 July 2022 as part of a series of mass resignations against Prime Minister Boris Johnson.

=== 4th term (2024–) ===
At the 2024 general election, Whately was again re-elected, with a decreased vote share of 31.8% and a decreased majority of 1,469.

Following the Conservative Party's defeat in the general election and the subsequent formation of the Starmer ministry, Whately was appointed Shadow Transport Secretary in Rishi Sunak's caretaker Shadow Cabinet. Upon Kemi Badenoch's victory in the 2024 Conservative Party leadership election Whately was appointed Shadow Secretary of State for Work and Pensions.

=== Campaigns ===
Whately campaigned with Kent County Council for two new schools to be opened in Maidstone, to relieve pressure on primary school places, as well as offering more places for children with special needs. This resulted in the opening of Maidstone Primary Academy and the secondary special school of Bearsted Academy.

She campaigned against Maidstone's Local Plan (a policy document that defines the framework for development in the area until 2031) as she felt that it did not have enough funding for improvements in infrastructure and roads and could damage local landmarks such as Leeds Castle. Both Whately and Maidstone and The Weald MP Helen Grant wrote to the then Secretary of State for Communities and Local Government Sajid Javid in September 2017 to intervene in the matter, but he declined as he felt that it was a decision that should be made locally. Maidstone Borough Council formally adopted the Local Plan in October.

== Personal life ==
Whately and her family divide their time between homes in London and a village near Faversham. In 2005 she married Marcus Whately (whom she met at the University of Oxford), the founder and co-chief executive officer of an energy company. They have three children. She has one elder brother, Robert Lightwood. Between 2015–2019, she was a vice-president of the Maidstone branch of the learning disability charity Mencap. She stood down from this position and it has been vacant since 2020.

As a horse rider she was a member of the British Junior Eventing Squad, and at university she was captain of the riding team and won two half-blues.

== Electoral history ==
General election 2024: Faversham and Mid Kent
Party	Candidate	Votes	%	±%
Conservative	Helen Whately	14,816	31.8	−30.8
Labour	Mel Dawkins	13,347	28.6	+8.8
Reform	Maxwell Harrison	9,884	21.2	New
Green	Hannah Temple	4,218	9.1	+5.0
Liberal Democrats	Hannah Perkins	4,158	8.9	−3.6
Majority		1,469	3.2	−39.6
Turnout		46,594	62.7	−4.5
Registered electors		74,301		
Conservative hold		Swing	−19.8	

Parliament of the United Kingdom
Preceded by Hugh Robertson	Member of Parliament for Faversham and Mid Kent; 2015–present	Incumbent
Party political offices
Preceded by James Cleverly	Deputy Chairman of the Conservative Party; 2019	Succeeded by Paul Scully
Political offices
Preceded by Rebecca Pow	Parliamentary Under-Secretary of State for Arts, Heritage and Tourism; 2019–2020	Succeeded by Nigel Huddleston
Preceded by Caroline Dinenage	Minister of State for Social Care; 2020–2021	Succeeded by Gillian Keegan
Preceded by Kemi Badenoch	Exchequer Secretary to the Treasury; 2021–2022	Succeeded by Alan Mak
