= Wykeham House School =

Location
- East Street; Fareham, Hampshire, PO16 0BW; England
- Coordinates: 50.8526°N 1.1726°W

Information
- Type: Private day school
- Motto: Vouloir c'est pouvoir ("Wanting is being able to", loosely translated as "When there's a will, there's a way")
- Religious affiliation: Church of England
- Established: 1913
- Closed: 16 December 2015
- Local authority: Hampshire
- Department for Education URN: 116541 Tables
- Gender: Girls (until 2013); Girls and Boys (educated Separately) (thereafter)
- Age: 3 to 16
- Houses: Itchen, Test, Hamble, Beaulieu (named after rivers in Hampshire)
- Colours: Green, Red and Gold
- Website: http://www.wykehamhouse.com/

Wykeham House School is a former independent day school for girls and boys in market town of Fareham, Hampshire in South East England. Until its closure Wykeham House School was the only school in the Borough of Fareham offering specialised single sex education for both girls and boys.

In October 2015 the proprietors of neighbouring Boundary Oak School disclosed to parents that they were in discussion with Wykeham House School for a possible acquisition or merger. In response, Wykeham House School invited parents of Wykeham House pupils to an urgent meeting on 15 October 2015 at which the existence of confidential merger discussions was confirmed. A subsequent reduction in pupil numbers at Wykeham House led to Wykeham House School formally announcing its closure on 12 November 2015. The School closed at the end of Autumn Term on 16 December 2015. Administrators were appointed on 11 January 2016.

== History ==
Wykeham House School was founded as a single sex girls' school by a Mrs Baylis in 1913. It was located at Orme Lodge on West Street, Fareham. The school moved to 69 High Street, Fareham in 1928. As the school grew it expanded and purchased neighbouring properties. It moved to a new location, a large Georgian house, at East Street Fareham in 1986. A new school hall was constructed by funds raised solely by pupils and staff and opened in 2000.

In 2013 the school was supplemented by a separate boys' junior school and further, in 2014, by a boys' senior school. The boys' school was officially opened by Mark Hoban, MP on 21 January 2015. To accommodate the growing number of new boys the school expanded to include the property at 6 The High Street, Fareham from September 2014.

The school celebrated its centenary in 2013 with year-long celebrations including the burial of a time-capsule. The time-capsule was retrieved and relocated just before the school's closure.

== School performance and academics ==
The school was academically strong with 91% of GCSE pupils achieving five or more A* to C grades including Maths, English and Science, 14% of grades being A* and nearly 30% of grades at A* and A. The Independent Schools Inspectorate inspected the school in 2013 and described the school as excellent in early years' provision, curriculum, extra-curricular program, quality of teaching, pupils' personal development, governance and leadership.

== Curriculum ==
The Senior School taught subjects including: Art and Design; Mathematics; Science (integrated and separate sciences); English Language and Literature; Geography; History; Music; Modern languages including French, German and Spanish; Religious Studies; PSHE; Physical Education; Business Studies; and Design and Technology.

== Extra curricular ==
Wykeham House School offered a wide variety of extra-curricular activities including clubs in sports, academics, arts and hobbies along with frequent cultural trips including many overseas trips.

Sports provision at Wykeham House School drew upon playing fields at Bath Lane, Fareham and the facilities at local sports and leisure centres with activities including: netball, hockey, rounders, swimming, football, rugby, rock climbing and sailing. The school regularly competed in inter-school competitions. In particular, the boys' school integrated sport and physical activity as a complementary teaching aid.

Wykeham House School provided additional tuition in music, speech and drama, singing and dance. A former pupil has earned a three-year dance scholarship at a prestigious dance academy. In January 2015 Wykeham House School won first place in the Intermediate category and second place in the Senior category at the Rotary Club Youth Speaks Competition.

Wykeham House School supported pupils through the Duke of Edinburgh Award, St. John Ambulance groups and numerous charity projects. In 2015 a Wykeham House pupil was awarded Cadet of the Year for District 2 St. John Ambulance and in 2016 a pupil was awarded Regional Cadet of the Year for the South East Region.

== The school before closure ==
Wykeham House School was a not-for-profit charitable trust with a board of trustees as governors. The school operated as separate girls' and boys' schools under the executive headship of headteacher Mrs Jan Caddy. The boys' school operates under the headship of dedicated boys' headmaster Mr Gareth Case.

The school had small class sizes providing staff-pupil ratios that enhance pupil progress. Admission to the junior school was following a taster-day visit and entry to the senior school was by entrance examination.
