= David Mowat =

British former Conservative politician

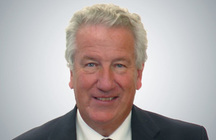
- Mowat in 2016

Parliamentary Under-Secretary of State for Care and Support
- In office 14 July 2016 – 9 June 2017
- Prime Minister: Theresa May
- Preceded by: Alistair Burt
- Succeeded by: Caroline Dinenage

Member of Parliament for Warrington South
- In office 6 May 2010 – 3 May 2017
- Preceded by: Helen Southworth
- Succeeded by: Faisal Rashid

Personal details
- Born: 20 February 1957 (age 69) Rugby, Warwickshire, England
- Party: Conservative
- Spouse: Nicky Mowat
- Education: Imperial College London
- Profession: Chartered accountant
- Website: www.davidmowat.org.uk

David John Mowat (born 20 February 1957) is a former Conservative Party politician in the United Kingdom. He was the Member of Parliament (MP) for Warrington South, and was first elected at the 2010 general election. He was appointed as Parliamentary Under-Secretary of State for Care and Support at the Department of Health in July 2016. He lost the seat to Labour at the 2017 election.

== Early life ==
Mowat attended Lawrence Sheriff School and at one point was in the same class as Rugby MP Mark Pawsey. He then went on to study engineering at Imperial College London.

== Career before Parliament ==
After graduating, Mowat qualified as a Chartered Accountant and subsequently joined the consultancy firm Accenture where he eventually became a Global Managing Partner responsible for a business with a turnover of over £500m.

Prior to his election to Parliament, Mowat served as the Chairman of Fairbridge, a charitable organisation in Salford which helps to improve the life chances of disadvantaged young people. Mowat also served as a Councillor on Macclesfield Borough Council from 2007 to 2008.

== Parliamentary career ==
Mowat served as a member of the Scottish Affairs Select Committee from 2010 to 2012 and also served on the Joint Committee scrutinising the draft Financial Services Bill. He was a trustee of the House of Commons Pension Fund and served on the Board of the Parliamentary Office for Science & Technology, the non-partisan advisory body on Science & Technology policy within Parliament.

He was also a member of several All Party Parliamentary Groups including Autism, Financial Education for Young People, Chess, Nuclear and Rail in the North. He was vice-chairman President of the Rugby League and Nuclear Power Groups. He was also co-chair of the All-Party Group on Rebalancing the British Economy and became Chair of the UK Aluminium Industry APPG in 2013.

On 10 September 2012 Mowat was appointed as Parliamentary Private Secretary to the then Financial Secretary to the Treasury, Greg Clark and followed Clark to the Cabinet Office following a reshuffle in 2014. Mowat stepped down from the role in 2015.

Mowat was opposed to Brexit prior to the 2016 referendum.

Following the appointment of Theresa May as Prime Minister in July 2016, Mowat was appointed to the Department of Health as the Parliamentary Under-Secretary of State for Care and Support.

== Election to Parliament ==
Mowat was elected to Parliament for the Warrington South Constituency on 6 May 2010 during the 2010 General Election with a majority of 1,553 over the Labour candidate after incumbent Labour MP Helen Southworth decided to step down. He was re-elected in 2015 with an increased majority after adding 6,287 votes compared to 2010 – the highest such increase in any seat apart from Thirsk & Malton. He failed to get elected for a third time in the 2017 United Kingdom general election, losing out to Labour's Faisal Rashid.

General election 2015: Warrington South
Party	Candidate	Votes	%	±%
Conservative	David Mowat	25,928	43.7	+7.9
Labour	Nick Bent	23,178	39.1	+6.1
UKIP	Mal Lingley	4,909	8.3	+5.3
Liberal Democrats	Bob Barr	3,335	5.6	−21.9
Green	Stephanie Davies	1,765	3.0	+2.2
TUSC	Kevin Bennett	238	0.4	+0.4
Majority		2,750	4.6	+1.8
Turnout		59,353	69.4	+1.2
Conservative hold		Swing		

General election 2010: Warrington South
Party	Candidate	Votes	%	±%
Conservative	David Mowat	19,641	35.8	+3.7
Labour	Nick Bent	18,088	33.0	−8.3
Liberal Democrats	Jo Crotty	15,094	27.5	+3.5
UKIP	Derek Ashington	1,624	3.0	+1.2
Green	Stephanie Davies	427	0.8	+0.8
Majority		1,553	2.8	
Turnout		54,874	68.2	+6.7
Conservative gain from Labour		Swing	+6.0	

Parliament of the United Kingdom
Preceded by Helen Southworth	Member of Parliament for Warrington South; 2010–2017	Succeeded by Faisal Rashid
