= Warrington South =

UK Parliament constituency (since 1983)

Coordinates: 53°22′N 2°33′W

- County constituency for the House of Commons
- Interactive map of boundaries since 2024
- Location within North West England
- County: Cheshire
- Electorate: 76,639 (March 2020)
- Major settlements: Great Sankey, Penketh, Warrington

Current constituency
- Created: 1983
- Member of Parliament: Sarah Hall (Labour Co-op)
- Seats: One
- Created from: Warrington, Runcorn and Newton

Warrington South is a constituency (Note: A borough constituency (for the purposes of election expenses and type of returning officer).) represented in the House of Commons of the UK Parliament by Sarah Hall from the Labour and Co-operative Party since 2024.

== Constituency profile ==
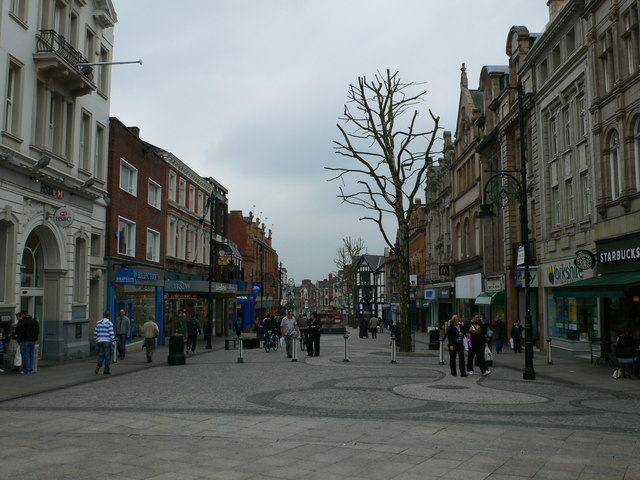
Buttermarket Street, Warrington

Warrington South is a constituency in Cheshire in North West England. It covers the town centre of Warrington and the neighbourhoods to its south and west, including Bewsey, Great Sankey, Penketh, Latchford, Thelwall, Grappenhall, Stockton Heath, Walton, Appleton and Stretton.

Warrington is a large town located between Liverpool and Manchester, around 15 miles (24 km) from both cities. It is a historic market town which grew rapidly during the Industrial Revolution as a centre for steelmaking, textile manufacturing and brewing. Warrington town centre is highly-deprived, however the rest of the constituency is wealthy with many affluent, suburban neighbourhoods; this area contains many large detached and semi-detached properties which were built after Warrington was designated a new town in 1968. House prices in Warrington South are generally higher than the rest of North East England but lower than the UK average.

Residents of Warrington North have a similar age profile to the country as a whole, albeit with a below-average proportion of young adults. Residents have high levels of income and homeownership and the child poverty rate is low. They have average levels of education and a high proportion work in professional, scientific and business administration occupations. The percentage of residents claiming unemployment benefits is low. White people made up 92% of the population at the 2021 census. Many residents are religious; like much of North West England, there is a large Roman Catholic population here due to historic Irish migration.

At the local borough council, the central and western neighbourhoods of the town are represented by the Labour Party whilst the southern areas elected Liberal Democrats. An estimated 50% of voters in Warrington South supported leaving the European Union in the 2016 referendum, marginally lower than the UK-wide figure of 52%.

== Creation ==
The constituency was created for the 1983 general election following the major reorganisation of local authorities under the Local Government Act 1972, which came into effect on 1 April 1974. It comprised parts of the abolished constituencies of Newton, Runcorn and Warrington.

== Boundaries ==
=== Historic ===
Map of former boundaries, used from 2010–2024 inclusive

1983–1997: The Borough of Warrington wards of Appleton and Stretton, Booths Hill, Grappenhall and Thelwall, Great Sankey North, Great Sankey South, Heatley, Latchford, Lymm, Penketh and Cuerdley, Statham, Stockton Heath, and Walton and Westy, and the Borough of Halton wards of Daresbury and Norton.

Areas to the south of the Manchester Ship Canal, now part of the newly formed Borough of Warrington (including Lymm), and the Borough of Halton wards were previously part of Runcorn constituency. Great Sankey and Penketh, to the west of the town, were previously part of Newton. Also included a small part of the abolished Warrington constituency.

1997–2010: The Borough of Warrington wards of Appleton, Stretton and Hatton, Grappenhall and Thelwall, Great Sankey North, Great Sankey South, Howley and Whitecross, Latchford, Lymm, Penketh and Cuerdley, Stockton Heath, and Walton and Westy.

Under the Fourth Periodic Review of constituencies, the number of constituencies in Cheshire was increased from 10 to 11 and the Borough of Halton wards were now included in the newly created constituency of Weaver Vale. To compensate for this loss, the town centre area was transferred from Warrington North.

2010–2024: The Borough of Warrington wards of Appleton, Bewsey and Whitecross, Grappenhall and Thelwall, Great Sankey North, Great Sankey South, Hatton, Stretton and Walton, Latchford East, Latchford West, Lymm, Penketh and Cuerdley, Stockton Heath, and Whittle Hall.

The boundaries introduced at the 2010 general election, following the Fifth Periodic Review, resulted in only minor changes due to revision of ward boundaries.

=== Current ===
Further to the 2023 review of Westminster constituencies, which came into effect for the 2024 general election, the constituency is composed of the following wards of the Borough of Warrington (as they existed on 1 December 2020):

- Appleton, Bewsey & Whitecross, Chapelford & Old Hall, Grappenhall, Great Sankey North & Whittle Hall, Great Sankey South, Latchford East, Latchford West, Lymm North & Thelwall (polling districts SNC, SND, SNE and SNF^{1}), Penketh & Cuerdley, and Stockton Heath.

^{1} Comprising the village of Thelwall.

The constituency was reduced in size to bring the electorate within the permitted range by transferring the village of Lymm (but not Thelwall) to Tatton.

== Political history ==
In 1983, the seat was won for the Conservatives by Mark Carlisle, who before the seat's creation had represented Runcorn. Carlisle served as Secretary of State for Education during part of the Thatcher ministry.

The seat has been relative to others a marginal seat since 2001 as well as a swing seat as its winner's majority has not exceeded 7.5% of the vote since the 16.3% majority won in that year. The seat has changed hands three times since that year.

Warrington South is considered the more volatile of the two Warrington seats. While Warrington North is a safe seat for the Labour Party, Warrington South is often a bellwether and is regarded as a marginal constituency; it has been won by the largest party in each Parliament at every election with the exception of 1992, when it was taken by Labour's Mike Hall with a majority of just 0.3%, and again in 2017. Hall moved to the new Weaver Vale seat in 1997, but the seat was retained for the Labour party by Helen Southworth who represented the seat until her retirement at the 2010 election and successor candidate's defeat.

=== 2010 election ===
On 15 June 2009, Helen Southworth announced her intention to retire the next year. Largely because of its close result in 2005, the seat was considered to be one of the key seats which the Conservative Party would have to win to become the largest party in Parliament. The BBC ranked Warrington South as the 85th most marginal seat. The new boundaries were considered to be slightly more favourable to the Labour Party according to an academic, non-partisan election analysis.

The Liberal Democrats had also identified Warrington South as a target seat. On election day the Liberal Democrat party held 22 of the 30 Borough Council seats in the wards which made up the constituency. The importance of the Warrington South seat was underlined when Nick Clegg, the Liberal Democrat party leader, chose to visit the constituency the morning after the first of the televised "leaders' debates", which he had been widely perceived as having won.

While all three parties made strenuous efforts to win the seat, it was the Conservative candidate David Mowat who was elected, although fewer than 5,000 votes separated all three parties.

=== Subsequent elections ===
In 2015 and 2017, the seat was considered an important Labour-Conservative marginal, the Liberal Democrats losing substantial ground here in both elections. The 2015 election saw Mowat re-elected with an increased majority; in 2017, it was regained by Labour's Faisal Rashid on a 4.4% swing. It was retaken for the Conservatives in 2019 by Andy Carter. In all three cases, the victory margin between first and second was smaller than overall vote of the third-placed Liberal Democrats, although the latter were a long way behind the top two parties. In 2024, due to boundary changes, the seat was considered a notional Labour seat despite being held by a Conservative MP in Andy Carter. It was taken officially for Labour by Sarah Hall, but records consider it a Labour hold rather than a Labour gain. Reform UK were placed third, bumping the Liberal Democrats down to fourth.

== Members of Parliament ==
| Election | Member | Party |
|---|---|---|
| 1983 | Mark Carlisle | Conservative |
| 1987 | Chris Butler | Conservative |
| 1992 | Mike Hall | Labour |
| 1997 | Helen Southworth | Labour |
| 2010 | David Mowat | Conservative |
| 2017 | Faisal Rashid | Labour |
| 2019 | Andy Carter | Conservative |
| 2024 | Sarah Hall | Labour Co-op |

== Elections ==
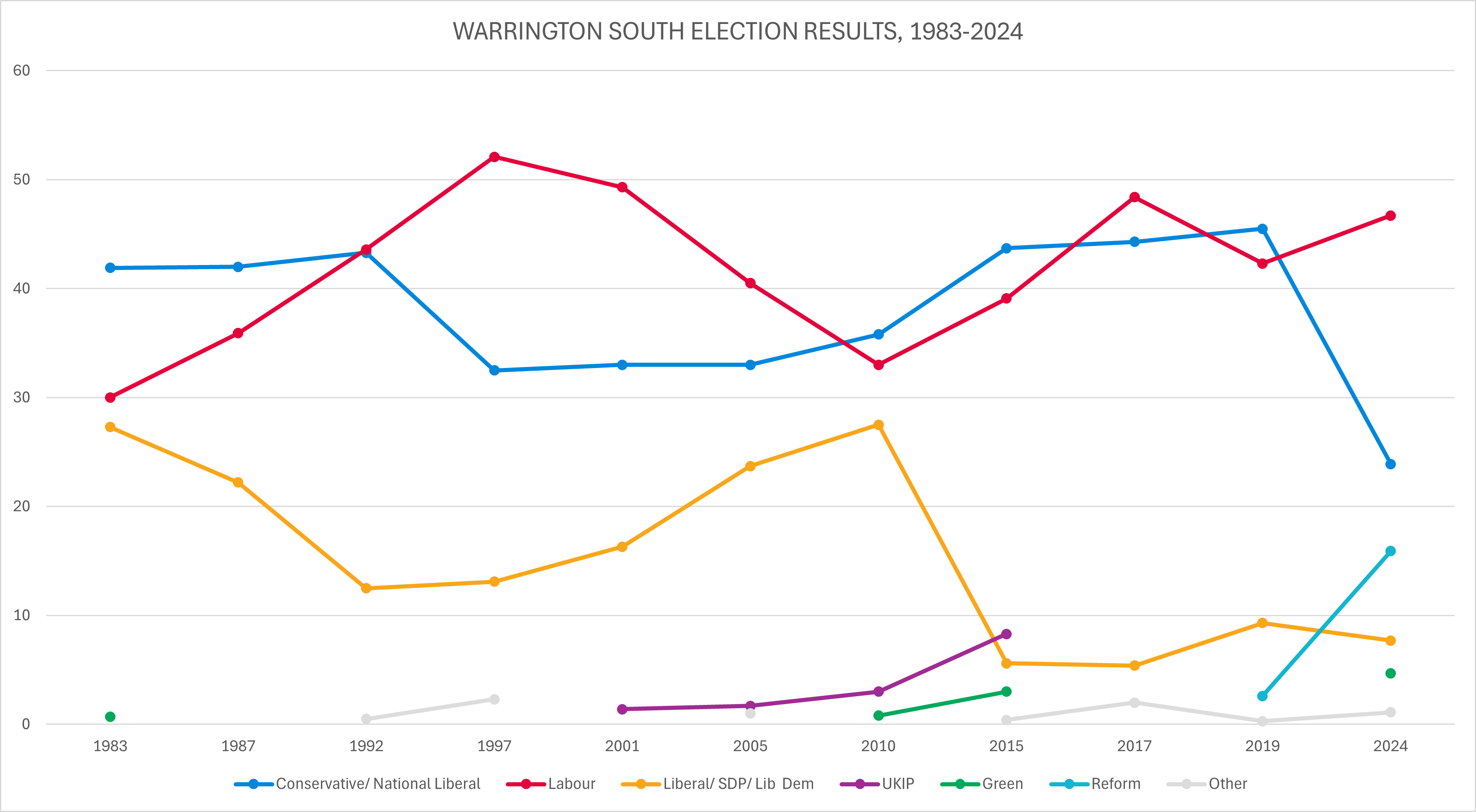
Election results 1983-2024

=== Elections in the 2020s ===
General election 2024: Warrington South
| Party | Candidate | Votes | % | ±% |
|---|---|---|---|---|
| Labour Co-op | Sarah Hall | 23,201 | 46.7 | +2.2 |
| Conservative | Andy Carter | 11,861 | 23.9 | −20.5 |
| Reform | Janet Barbara Balfe | 7,913 | 15.9 | +13.2 |
| Liberal Democrats | Graham Gowland | 3,829 | 7.7 | −0.5 |
| Green | Stephanie Davies | 2,313 | 4.7 | N/A |
| Independent | Peter Willett | 445 | 0.9 | N/A |
| SDP | Graeme Kelly | 110 | 0.2 | −0.1 |
| Majority | | 11,340 | 22.8 | N/A |
| Turnout | | 49,672 | 63.0 | −7.2 |
| Labour gain from Conservative | | Swing | +11.4 | |

=== Elections in the 2010s ===
General election 2019: Warrington South
| Party | Candidate | Votes | % | ±% |
|---|---|---|---|---|
| Conservative | Andy Carter | 28,187 | 45.5 | ▲1.2 |
| Labour | Faisal Rashid | 26,177 | 42.3 | ▼6.1 |
| Liberal Democrats | Ryan Bate | 5,732 | 9.3 | ▲3.9 |
| Brexit Party | Clare Aspinall | 1,635 | 2.6 | New |
| SDP | Kevin Hickson | 168 | 0.3 | New |
| Majority | | 2,010 | 3.2 | N/A |
| Turnout | | 61,899 | 72.0 | ▲0.4 |
| Conservative gain from Labour | | Swing | ▲0.9 | |

General election 2017: Warrington South
| Party | Candidate | Votes | % | ±% |
|---|---|---|---|---|
| Labour | Faisal Rashid | 29,994 | 48.4 | ▲9.3 |
| Conservative | David Mowat | 27,445 | 44.3 | ▲0.6 |
| Liberal Democrats | Bob Barr | 3,339 | 5.4 | ▼0.2 |
| Independent | John Boulton | 1,217 | 2.0 | New |
| Majority | | 2,549 | 4.1 | N/A |
| Turnout | | 61,995 | 72.4 | ▲3.0 |
| Labour gain from Conservative | | Swing | ▲7.7 | |

General election 2015: Warrington South
| Party | Candidate | Votes | % | ±% |
|---|---|---|---|---|
| Conservative | David Mowat | 25,928 | 43.7 | ▲7.9 |
| Labour | Nick Bent | 23,178 | 39.1 | ▲6.1 |
| UKIP | Mal Lingley | 4,909 | 8.3 | ▲5.3 |
| Liberal Democrats | Bob Barr | 3,335 | 5.6 | ▼21.9 |
| Green | Stephanie Davies | 1,765 | 3.0 | ▲2.2 |
| TUSC | Kevin Bennett | 238 | 0.4 | New |
| Majority | | 2,750 | 4.6 | ▲1.8 |
| Turnout | | 59,353 | 69.4 | ▲1.2 |
| Conservative hold | | Swing | ▲5.8 | |

General election 2010: Warrington South
| Party | Candidate | Votes | % | ±% |
|---|---|---|---|---|
| Conservative | David Mowat | 19,641 | 35.8 | ▲3.7 |
| Labour | Nick Bent | 18,088 | 33.0 | ▼8.3 |
| Liberal Democrats | Jo Crotty | 15,094 | 27.5 | ▲3.5 |
| UKIP | Derek Ashington | 1,624 | 3.0 | ▲1.2 |
| Green | Stephanie Davies | 427 | 0.8 | New |
| Majority | | 1,553 | 2.8 | N/A |
| Turnout | | 54,874 | 68.2 | ▲6.7 |
| Conservative gain from Labour | | Swing | ▲1.9 | |

=== Elections in the 2000s ===
General election 2005: Warrington South
| Party | Candidate | Votes | % | ±% |
|---|---|---|---|---|
| Labour | Helen Southworth | 18,972 | 40.5 | ▼8.8 |
| Conservative | Fiona Bruce | 15,457 | 33.0 | 0.0 |
| Liberal Democrats | Ian Marks | 11,111 | 23.7 | ▲7.4 |
| UKIP | Gerry Kelley | 804 | 1.7 | ▲0.3 |
| Independent | Paul Kennedy (Note: Later, in 2006 Paul Kennedy joined the Conservative Party and became a local councillor in May 2008.) | 453 | 1.0 | New |
| Majority | | 3,515 | 7.5 | ▼8.8 |
| Turnout | | 46,797 | 61.8 | ▲0.6 |
| Labour hold | | Swing | ▼5.8 | |

General election 2001: Warrington South
| Party | Candidate | Votes | % | ±% |
|---|---|---|---|---|
| Labour | Helen Southworth | 22,419 | 49.3 | ▼2.8 |
| Conservative | Caroline Mosley | 15,022 | 33.0 | ▲0.5 |
| Liberal Democrats | Roger J. Barlow | 7,419 | 16.3 | ▲3.2 |
| UKIP | Joan Kelley | 637 | 1.4 | New |
| Majority | | 7,397 | 16.3 | ▼3.3 |
| Turnout | | 45,497 | 61.2 | ▼14.8 |
| Labour hold | | Swing | ▼1.7 | |

=== Elections in the 1990s ===
General election 1997: Warrington South
| Party | Candidate | Votes | % | ±% |
|---|---|---|---|---|
| Labour | Helen Southworth | 28,721 | 52.1 | ▲8.5 |
| Conservative | Chris Grayling | 17,914 | 32.5 | ▼10.8 |
| Liberal Democrats | Peter Walker | 7,199 | 13.1 | ▲0.6 |
| Referendum | Gerald Kelly | 1,082 | 2.0 | New |
| Natural Law | Steve Ross | 166 | 0.3 | New |
| Majority | | 10,807 | 19.6 | ▲19.3 |
| Turnout | | 55,082 | 76.0 | ▼6.0 |
| Labour hold | | Swing | ▲8.1 | |

General election 1992: Warrington South
| Party | Candidate | Votes | % | ±% |
|---|---|---|---|---|
| Labour | Mike Hall | 27,819 | 43.6 | ▲7.7 |
| Conservative | Chris Butler | 27,628 | 43.3 | ▲1.3 |
| Liberal Democrats | Peter Walker | 7,978 | 12.5 | ▼9.7 |
| Natural Law | Stephen Benson | 321 | 0.5 | New |
| Majority | | 191 | 0.3 | N/A |
| Turnout | | 63,746 | 82.0 | ▲6.8 |
| Labour gain from Conservative | | Swing | ▲6.8 | |

=== Elections in the 1980s ===
General election 1987: Warrington South
| Party | Candidate | Votes | % | ±% |
|---|---|---|---|---|
| Conservative | Chris Butler | 24,809 | 42.0 | ▲0.1 |
| Labour | Albert Booth | 21,200 | 35.9 | ▲5.9 |
| Liberal | Ian Marks | 13,112 | 22.2 | ▼5.1 |
| Majority | | 3,609 | 6.1 | ▼5.8 |
| Turnout | | 59,121 | 75.2 | ▲0.7 |
| Conservative hold | | Swing | ▼2.9 | |

General election 1983: Warrington South
| Party | Candidate | Votes | % | ±% |
|---|---|---|---|---|
| Conservative | Mark Carlisle | 22,740 | 41.9 | |
| Labour | David Colin-Thomé | 16,275 | 30.0 | |
| Liberal | Ian Marks | 14,827 | 27.3 | |
| Ecology | Neil Chantrell | 403 | 0.7 | |
| Majority | | 6,465 | 11.9 | |
| Turnout | | 54,245 | 74.5 | |
| Conservative win (new seat) | | | | |

== See also ==
- List of parliamentary constituencies in Cheshire
- History of parliamentary constituencies and boundaries in Cheshire
