= List of electoral wards in Buckinghamshire =

This is a list of electoral divisions and wards in the ceremonial county of Buckinghamshire in South East England. All changes since the re-organisation of local government following the passing of the Local Government Act 1972 are shown. The number of councillors elected for each electoral division or ward is shown in brackets.

Following The Local Government Boundary Commission for England review (2021 -2023), the Buckinghamshire (Electoral Changes) Order 2023 came into effect.

This order covers the legislative electoral district of Buckinghamshire, and therefore applies to the legislative or administrative boundaries of Buckinghamshire.

Like many counties in England, the broader ceremonial, historic or cultural boundaries of Buckinghamshire date back hundreds of years and may not necessarily coincide with more recent politically drawn boundaries.

Over time this drift can create significant paradoxical effects whereby large population centres like Milton Keynes are ceremonially a part of Buckinghamshire, but are administratively independent.

== Unitary authority councils ==
=== Buckinghamshire ===
Wards from 1 April 2020 (first election 6 May 2021) to 1 May 2025:

1. Abbey (3)
2. Amersham & Chesham Bois (3)
3. Aston Clinton & Bierton (3)
4. Aylesbury Eeast (3)
5. Aylesbury North (3)
6. Aylesbury North West (3)
7. Aylesbury South East (3)
8. Aylesbury South West (3)
9. Aylesbury West (3)
10. Beaconsfield (3)
11. Bernwood (3)
12. Booker, Cressex & Castlefield (3)
13. Buckingham East (3)
14. Buckingham West (3)
15. Chalfont St Giles (3)
16. Chalfont St Peter (3)
17. Chesham (3)
18. Chess Valley (3)
19. Chiltern Ridges (3)
20. Chiltern Villages (3)
21. Cliveden (3)
22. Denham (3)
23. Downley (3)
24. Farnham Common & Burnham Beeches (3)
25. Flackwell Heath, Little Marlow & Marlow South East (3)
26. Gerrards Cross (3)
27. Great Brickhill (3)
28. Great Missenden (3)
29. Grendon Underwood (3)
30. Hazlemere (3)
31. Iver (3)
32. Ivinghoe (3)
33. Little Chalfont & Amersham Common (3)
34. Marlow (3)
35. Penn Wood & Old Amersham (3)
36. Ridgeway East (3)
37. Ridgeway West (3)
38. The Risboroughs (3)
39. Ryemead & Micklefield (3)
40. Stoke Poges & Wexham (3)
41. Stone & Waddesdon (3)
42. Terriers & Amersham Hill (3)
43. Totteridge & Bowerdean (3)
44. Tylers Green & Loudwater (3)
45. Wendover, Halton & Stoke Mandeville (3)
46. West Wycombe (3)
47. Wing (3)
48. Winslow (3)
49. The Wooburns, Bourne End & Hedsor (3)

Wards from 1 May 2025 to present:

1. Abbey (2)
2. Amersham & Chesham Bois (3)
3. Aston Clinton & Weston Turville (2)
4. Aylesbury East (2)
5. Aylesbury North (2)
6. Aylesbury North West (2)
7. Aylesbury South East (2)
8. Aylesbury South West (2)
9. Aylesbury West (2)
10. Beaconsfield (2)
11. Berryfields, Buckingham Park & Watermead (2)
12. Bierton, Kingsbrook & Wing (2)
13. Booker & Cressex (1)
14. Buckingham (3)
15. Burnham (3)
16. Castlefield & Oakridge (2)
17. Chalfont St Giles & Little Chalfont (3)
18. Chalfont St Peter (2)
19. Chesham North (3)
20. Chesham South (2)
21. Chiltern Villages (1)
22. Disraeli (1)
23. Downley (1)
24. Farnhams & Stoke Poges (3)
25. Flackwell Heath & The Wooburns (3)
26. Gerrards Cross & Denham (3)
27. Grendon Underwood & The Claydons (2)
28. Haddenham & Stone (2)
29. Hazlemere (2)
30. Horwood (1)
31. Iver (2)
32. Ivinghoe (2)
33. Long Crendon (1)
34. Marlow (3)
35. Marsh & Micklefield (2)
36. The Missendens (3)
37. Newton Longville (2)
38. Penn, Tylers Green & Loudwater (2)
39. Princes Risborough (2)
40. Quainton (1)
41. Ridgeway East (2)
42. Ridgeway West (2)
43. Sands (1)
44. Terriers & Amersham Hill (2)
45. Totteridge & Bowerdean (2)
46. Waddesdon (1)
47. Wendover, Halton & Stoke Mandeville (2)
48. West Wycombe & Lane End (1)
49. Winslow (1)

=== Milton Keynes ===
Wards from 1 April 1974 (first election 7 June 1973) to 6 May 1976:

1. No. 1 (Bletchley: Central) (1)
2. No. 2 (Bletchley: Denbigh) (5)
3. No. 3 (Bletchley: Eaton) (4)
4. No. 5 (Bletchley: Watling) (2)
5. No. 8 (Wolverton) (4)
6. No. 9 (Stoney Stratford) (3)
7. No. 10 (New Bradwell) (2)
8. No. 11 (Olney) (2)
9. No. 13 (Linford) (2)
10. No. 15 (Woughton) (1)
11. No. 16 (Woburn Sands) (2)
12. No. 17 (Bradwell Linford Loughton & Stantonbury) (1)
13. Lavendon (1)
14. Newport Pagnell (4)
15. Newton (2)
16. Sherington (1)
17. Whaddon (3)

Wards from 6 May 1976 to 2 May 1996:

Wards from 2 May 1996 to 2 May 2002:

1. Bradwell Abbey (2)
2. Bradwell (2)
3. Campbell Park (3)
4. Danesborough (2)
5. Denbigh (3)
6. Eaton Manor (2)
7. Emerson Valley (2)
8. Fenny Stratford (2)
9. Furzton (2)
10. Hanslope Park (1)
11. Linford North (2)
12. Linford South (2)
13. Loughton Park (3)
14. Newport Pagnell North (2)
15. Newport Pagnell South (2)
16. Olney (2)
17. Ouse Valley (1)
18. Sherington (1)
19. Stantonbury (2)
20. Stony Stratford (2)
21. Walton Park (3)
22. Whaddon (2)
23. Wolverton (3)
24. Woughton (3)

Wards from 2 May 2002 to 22 May 2014:

1. Bletchley & Fenny Stratford (3)
2. Bradwell (3)
3. Campbell Park (3)
4. Danesborough (1)
5. Denbigh (2)
6. Eaton Manor (2)
7. Emerson Valley (3)
8. Furzton (2)
9. Hanslope Park (1)
10. Linford North (2)
11. Linford South (2)
12. Loughton Park (3)
13. Middleton (2)
14. Newport Pagnell North (2)
15. Newport Pagnell South (2)
16. Olney (2)
17. Sherington (1)
18. Stantonbury (2)
19. Stony Stratford (3)
20. Walton Park (3)
21. Whaddon (2)
22. Wolverton (3)
23. Woughton (2)

Wards from 22 May 2014 to 7 May 2026:

1. Bletchley East (3)
2. Bletchley Park (3)
3. Bletchley West (3)
4. Bradwell (3)
5. Broughton (3)
6. Campbell Park & Old Woughton (3)
7. Central Milton Keynes (3)
8. Danesborough & Walton (3)
9. Loughton & Shenley (3)
10. Monkston (3)
11. Newport Pagnell North & Hanslope (3)
12. Newport Pagnell South (3)
13. Olney (3)
14. Shenley Brook End (3)
15. Stantonbury (3)
16. Stony Stratford (3)
17. Tattenhoe (3)
18. Wolverton (3)
19. Woughton & Fishermead (3)

Wards from 7 May 2026 to present:

1. Bletchley Park & Fenny Stratford (3)
2. Bletchley South (3)
3. Bletchley West (3)
4. Bradwell (3)
5. Broughton & Moulsoe (3)
6. Campbell Park & Willen (3)
7. Central Milton Keynes (3)
8. Danesborough (3)
9. Furzton (3)
10. Great Linford (3)
11. Hanslope (1)
12. New Bradwell (2)
13. Newport Pagnell (3)
14. Olney & Rural (3)
15. Ouzel Valley (3)
16. Stony Stratford (3)
17. Tattenhoe (3)
18. Walton (3)
19. Watling (3)
20. Wolverton (3)
21. Woughton & Fishermead (3)

== Former county council ==
=== Buckinghamshire ===
Electoral Divisions from 1 April 1974 (first election 12 April 1973) to 2 May 1985:

1. Amersham-on-the-Hill & Little Cha (2)
2. Aylesbury Northern (2)
3. Aylesbury Rural No. 1 (Aston Clinto (1)
4. Aylesbury Rural No. 2 (Haddenham An (1)
5. Aylesbury Rural No. 3 (Long Crendon (1)
6. Aylesbury Rural No. 4 (Waddesdon) (1)
7. Aylesbury Rural No. 5 (Wendover) (1)
8. Aylesbury South Eastern (2)
9. Aylesbury South Western (1)
10. Beaconsfield (2)
11. Bletchley Eastern (2)
12. Bletchley Western (2)
13. Buckingham (1)
14. Buckingham Rural North (1)
15. Buckingham Rural South (1)
16. Burnham (2)
17. Chalfont St Giles (2)
18. Chalfont St Peter (2)
19. Chesham (3)
20. Chesham Bois (1)
21. Eton No. 1 (Burnham & Farnham) (1)
22. Eton No. 2 (Denham) (1)
23. Eton No. 3 (Gerrards Cross) (1)
24. Eton No. 4 (Stoke & Wexham) (1)
25. Great Missenden (2)
26. High Wycombe East Central (2)
27. High Wycombe Eastern (2)
28. High Wycombe West Central (2)
29. High Wycombe Western (2)
30. Iver (2)
31. Marlow (2)
32. Newport Pagnell (1)
33. Newport Pagnell Rural No. 1 (Bradwe (1)
34. Newport Pagnell Rural No. 2 (Olney) (1)
35. Newport Pagnell Rural No. 3 (Woburn (1)
36. Penn & Amersham Town (1)
37. Stony Stratford (1)
38. Wing No. 1 (Edlesborough & Ivingh (1)
39. Wing No. 2 (Wing) (1)
40. Winslow No. 1 (Whaddon Chase) (1)
41. Winslow No. 2 (Winslow) (1)
42. Wolverton (1)
43. Wycombe No. 1 (Chepping Wycombe) (2)
44. Wycombe No. 2 (Hambleden & Lane E (1)
45. Wycombe No. 3 (Hughenden) (2)
46. Wycombe No. 4 (Risborough) (2)
47. Wycombe No. 5 (Stokenchurch) (1)
48. Wycombe No. 6 (Wooburn) (2)

Electoral Divisions from 2 May 1985 to 5 May 2005:

1. Amersham East (1)
2. Amersham North & Chesham Bois (1)
3. Amersham Town & Penn (1)
4. Aston Clinton & Weston Turville (1)
5. Aylesbury Bedgrove (1)
6. Aylesbury Eastern & Bierton (1)
7. Aylesbury North Western (1)
8. Aylesbury Northern (1)
9. Aylesbury South Western (1)
10. Aylesbury Southcourt (1)
11. Beaconsfield (1)
12. Booker & Castlefield (1)
13. Bowerdean & Daws Hill (1)
14. Bradwell (1); electoral division abolished in 1997
15. Buckingham North (1)
16. Buckingham South (1)
17. Burnham & Old Beaconsfield (1)
18. Chalfont St Giles (1)
19. Chalfont St Peter East (1)
20. Chalfont St Peter West (1)
21. Chesham East (1)
22. Chesham North (1)
23. Chesham West (1)
24. Cressex & Frogmoor (1)
25. Denbigh (1); electoral division abolished in 1997
26. Denham (1)
27. Eaton Manor (1); electoral division abolished in 1997
28. Fenny Stratford (1); electoral division abolished in 1997
29. Flackwell Heath (1)
30. Fulmer Wexham & Iver Heath (1)
31. Gerrards Cross (1)
32. Green Hill & Totteridge (1)
33. Haddenham & Stone (1)
34. Hazlemere North (1)
35. Icknield & Bledlow (1)
36. Iver & Colnbrook (1)
37. Ivinghoe (1)
38. Keep Hill & Hicks Farm (1)
39. Linford North (1); electoral division abolished in 1997
40. Linford South (1); electoral division abolished in 1997
41. Long Crendon & Brill (1)
42. Loughton Valley (1); electoral division abolished in 1997
43. Marlow North (1)
44. Marlow Rural (1)
45. Marlow South (1)
46. Marsh & Micklefield (1)
47. Milton Keynes East (1); electoral division abolished in 1997
48. Missenden Prestwood (1)
49. Missenden Ridings (1)
50. Naphill (1)
51. New Bradwell (1); electoral division abolished in 1997
52. Newport Pagnell West (1); electoral division abolished in 1997
53. Oakridge & Tinkers Wood (1)
54. Olney (1); electoral division abolished in 1997
55. Petsoe Manor (1); electoral division abolished in 1997
56. Princes Risborough (1)
57. St Marys (1); electoral division abolished in 1997
58. Stoke Poges & Farnham Royal (1)
59. Stokenchurch (1)
60. Stony Stratford (1); electoral division abolished in 1997
61. Taplow Dorney & Lent Rise (1)
62. Tylers Green (1)
63. Waddesdon & Whitchurch (1)
64. Wendover (1)
65. West Wycombe & Sands (1)
66. Whaddon (1); electoral division abolished in 1997
67. Wing (1)
68. Winslow (1)
69. Wolverton (1); electoral division abolished in 1997
70. Wooburn (1)
71. Woughton (1); electoral division abolished in 1997

Electoral Divisions from 5 May 2005 to 2 May 2013:

1. Abbey (1)
2. Alderbourne (1)
3. Amersham (2)
4. Aston Clinton (1) †
5. Aylesbury East (2)
6. Aylesbury North (2) †
7. Aylesbury South (1) †
8. Aylesbury South East (1)
9. Aylesbury West (2)
10. Beaconsfield (1)
11. Bernwood (1)
12. Booker, Cressex & Sands (1)
13. Bowerdean, Micklefield & Totteridge (2)
14. Buckingham North (1) †
15. Buckingham South (1)
16. Bulstrode (1)
17. Burnham Beeches (1)
18. Chalfont St Peter (1)
19. Chesham East (1)
20. Chesham North West (1)
21. Chess Valley (1)
22. Chiltern Ridges (1)
23. Chiltern Valley (1)
24. Downley, Disraeli, Oakridge & Castlefield (2)
25. Gerrards Cross & Denham North (1)
26. Great Brickhill (1)
27. Great Missenden (1) †
28. Greater Hughenden (1)
29. Grendon Underwood (1) †
30. Haddenham (1) †
31. Hazlemere (1)
32. Icknield & Bledlow (1)
33. Iver (1)
34. Ivinghoe (1)
35. Marlow (2)
36. Penn, Coleshill & Holmer Green (1) †
37. Ryemead, Tylers Green & Loudwater (2)
38. Stoke Poges & Farnham Common (1)
39. Stokenchurch, Radnage & West Wycombe (1)
40. Taplow, Dorney & Lent Rise (1)
41. Terriers & Amersham Hill (1)
42. Thames (2)
43. The Chalfonts & Seer Green (2)
44. The Risboroughs (1)
45. Wendover & Halton (1)
46. Wing (1)
47. Winslow (1)

† minor boundary changes in 2009

Electoral Divisions from 2 May 2013 to 1 April 2020 (county abolished):

1. Abbey (1)
2. Amersham & Chesham Bois (1)
3. Aston Clinton & Bierton (1)
4. Aylesbury East (1)
5. Aylesbury North (1)
6. Aylesbury North-West (1)
7. Aylesbury South-East (1)
8. Aylesbury South-West (1)
9. Aylesbury West (1)
10. Beaconsfield (1)
11. Bernwood (1)
12. Booker, Cressex & Castlefield (1)
13. Buckingham East (1)
14. Buckingham West (1)
15. Chalfont St Giles (1)
16. Chalfont St Peter (1)
17. Chesham (1)
18. Chess Valley (1)
19. Chiltern Ridges (1)
20. Chiltern Villages (1)
21. Cliveden (1)
22. Denham (1)
23. Downley (1)
24. Farnham Common & Burnham Beeches (1)
25. Flackwell Heath, Little Marlow & Marlow South-East (1)
26. Gerrards Cross (1)
27. Great Brickhill (1)
28. Great Missenden (1)
29. Grendon Underwood (1)
30. Hazlemere (1)
31. Iver (1)
32. Ivinghoe (1)
33. Little Chalfont & Amersham Common (1)
34. Marlow (1)
35. Penn Wood & Old Amersham (1)
36. Ridgeway East (1)
37. Ridgeway West (1)
38. Ryemead & Micklefield (1)
39. Stoke Poges & Wexham (1)
40. Stone & Waddesdon (1)
41. Terriers & Amersham Hill (1)
42. The Risboroughs (1)
43. The Wooburns, Bourne End & Hedsor (1)
44. Totteridge & Bowerdean (1)
45. Tylers Green & Loudwater (1)
46. Wendover, Halton & Stoke Mandeville (1)
47. West Wycombe (1)
48. Wing (1)
49. Winslow (1)

== Former district councils ==
=== Aylesbury Vale ===
Wards from 1 April 1974 (first election 7 June 1973) to 6 May 1976:

1. No. 1 (Tingewick) (1)
2. No. 2 (Luffield Abbey)
3. No. 13 (Winslow) (1)
4. No. 14 (Steeple Clayton) (1)
5. No. 15 (Buckingham) (3)
6. No. 16 (Marsh Gibbon) (1)
7. No. 24 (Aylesbury Northern) (6)
8. No. 25 (Aylesbury South Eastern) (6)
9. No. 26 (Aylesbury South Western) (6)
10. Aston Clinton (2)
11. Bierton (1)
12. Brill (1)
13. Cheddington (1)
14. Edlesborough (1)
15. Great Brickhill (1)
16. Great Horwood (1)
17. Grendon Underwood (1)
18. Haddenham (2)
19. Hogshaw (1)
20. Long Crendon (1)
21. Newton Longville (1)
22. Oakley (1)
23. Pitstone (1)
24. Quainton (1)
25. Stewkley (1)
26. Stone (2)
27. Waddesdon (1)
28. Wendover & Halton (3)
29. Weston Turville (2)
30. Wing (1)
31. Wingrave (1)

Wards from 6 May 1976 to 1 May 2003:

Wards from 1 May 2003 to 7 May 2015:

1. Aston Clinton (3) †
2. Aylesbury Central (1)
3. Bedgrove (3)
4. Bierton (1) †
5. Brill (1)
6. Buckingham North (2)
7. Buckingham South (2)
8. Cheddington (1) †
9. Coldharbour (3)
10. Edlesborough (1)
11. Elmhurst & Watermead (3)
12. Gatehouse (2)
13. Great Brickhill (1)
14. Great Horwood (1) †
15. Grendon Underwood (1)
16. Haddenham (3) †
17. Long Crendon (2)
18. Luffield Abbey (1) †
19. Mandeville & Elm Farm (3) †
20. Marsh Gibbon (1) †
21. Newton Longville (1)
22. Oakfield (2) †
23. Pitstone (1) †
24. Quainton (1)
25. Quarrendon (2) †
26. Southcourt (2)
27. Steeple Claydon (1) †
28. Stewkley (1)
29. Tingewick (1)
30. Waddesdon (1) †
31. Walton Court & Hawkslade (2)
32. Weedon (1) †
33. Wendover (3)
34. Wing (1) †
35. Wingrave (1) †
36. Winslow (2)

† minor boundary changes in 2007

Wards from 7 May 2015 to 1 April 2020 (council abolished):

1. Aston Clinton & Stoke Mandeville (3)
2. Bedgrove (2)
3. Buckingham North (2)
4. Buckingham South (2)
5. Central & Walton (2)
6. Coldharbour (3)
7. Edlesborough (1)
8. Elmhurst (2)
9. Gatehouse (3)
10. Great Brickhill & Newton Longville (2)
11. Great Horwood (1)
12. Grendon Underwood & Brill (1)
13. Haddenham & Stone (3)
14. Long Crendon (1)
15. Luffield Abbey (1)
16. Mandeville & Elm Farm (3)
17. Marsh Gibbon (1)
18. Oakfield & Bierton (3)
19. Oakley (1)
20. Pitstone & Cheddington (2)
21. Quainton (1)
22. Riverside (3)
23. Southcourt (2)
24. Steeple Claydon (1)
25. Stewkley (1)
26. Tingewick (1)
27. Waddesdon (1)
28. Walton Court & Hawkslade (2)
29. Watermead (1)
30. Wendover & Halton (3)
31. Wing (1)
32. Wingrave (1)
33. Winslow (2)

=== Chiltern ===
Wards from 1 April 1974 (first election 7 June 1973) to 6 May 1976:

1. No. 1 (Chesham Northern) (6)
2. No. 2 (Chesham Southern) (6)
3. No. 3 (Amersham-on-the-Hill) (3)
4. No. 4 (Amersham Town) (3)
5. No. 5 (Little Chalfont West) (2)
6. No. 6 (Little Chalfont East) (2)
7. No. 8 (Chalfont St Giles) (4)
8. No. 16 (Chesham Bois) (2)
9. No. 17 (Coleshill & Penn) (3)
10. No. 23 (Seer Green) (1)
11. Ashley Green & Latimer (1)
12. Austenwood (1)
13. Ballinger & South Heath (1)
14. Chalfont Common (2)
15. Chalfont St Peter Central (2)
16. Chartridge (1)
17. Chenies (1)
18. Cholesbury & The Lee (1)
19. Gold Hill (2)
20. Great Missenden (1)
21. Holmer Green (2)
22. Little Missenden (1)
23. Prestwood & Heath End (3)

Wards from 6 May 1976 to 1 May 2003:

Wards from 1 May 2003 to 1 April 2020 (council abolished):

1. Amersham Common (1)
2. Amersham-on-the-Hill (2)
3. Amersham Town (2)
4. Asheridge Vale & Lowndes (2)
5. Ashley Green, Latimer & Chenies (1)
6. Austenwood (1)
7. Ballinger, South Heath & Chartridge (1)
8. Central (2)
9. Chalfont Common (2)
10. Chalfont St Giles (3)
11. Chesham Bois & Weedon Hill (2)
12. Cholesbury, The Lee & Bellingdon (1)
13. Gold Hill (1)
14. Great Missenden (1)
15. Hilltop & Townsend (2)
16. Holmer Green (2) †
17. Little Chalfont (2)
18. Little Missenden (1)
19. Newtown (1)
20. Penn & Coleshill (2)
21. Prestwood & Heath End (3) †
22. Ridgeway (1)
23. St Mary’s & Waterside (2)
24. Seer Green (1)
25. Vale (1)

† minor boundary changes in 2007

=== South Bucks ===
Wards from 1 April 1974 (first election 7 June 1973) to 5 May 1983:

1. No. 1 (Beaconsfield North) (3)
2. No. 2 (Beaconsfield South) (2)
3. No. 3 (Beaconsfield West) (2)
4. No. 4 (Burnham East & West) (4)
5. No. 5 (Burnham South) (3)
6. No. 6 (Denham) (5)
7. No. 8 (Farnham Royal) (3)
8. No. 9 (Fulmer) (1)
9. No. 10 (Gerrards Cross) (4)
10. No. 11 (Hedgerley) (1)
11. No. 16 (Stoke Poges) (3)
12. No. 18 (Wexham) (1)
13. Dorney (1)
14. Iver Colnbrook (1)
15. Iver Heath (3)
16. Iver Village (2)
17. Richings Park (1)
18. Taplow (2)

Wards from 5 May 1983 to 1 May 2003:

Wards from 1 May 2003 to 7 May 2015:

1. Beaconsfield North (3)
2. Beaconsfield South (2)
3. Beaconsfield West (2)
4. Burnham Beeches (1)
5. Burnham Church (3)
6. Burnham Lent Rise (3)
7. Denham North (2) †
8. Denham South (2)
9. Dorney & Burnham South (1)
10. Farnham Royal (3)
11. Gerrards Cross East & Denham South West (1)
12. Gerrards Cross North (2) †
13. Gerrards Cross South (2)
14. Hedgerley & Fulmer (1)
15. Iver Heath (3)
16. Iver Village & Richings Park (3)
17. Stoke Poges (3)
18. Taplow (1)
19. Wexham & Iver West (2)

† minor boundary changes in 2007

Wards from 7 May 2015 to 1 April 2020 (council abolished):

1. Beaconsfield North (1)
2. Beaconsfield South (2)
3. Beaconsfield West (2)
4. Burnham Church & Beeches (3)
5. Burnham Lent Rise & Taplow (3)
6. Denham (3)
7. Farnham & Hedgerley (3)
8. Gerrards Cross (3)
9. Iver Heath (2)
10. Iver Village & Richings Park (3)
11. Stoke Poges (2)
12. Wexham & Fulmer (1)

=== Wycombe ===
Wards from 1 April 1974 (first election 7 June 1973) to 5 May 1983:

1. No. 3 (Bledlow-cum-Saunderton) (1)
2. No. 5 (Stokenchurch) (2)
3. No. 9 (Hazlemere North) (2)
4. No. 11 (High Wycombe Western) (6)
5. No. 12 (High Wycombe West Central) (6)
6. No. 13 (High Wycombe East Central) (6)
7. No. 14 (High Wycombe Eastern) (6)
8. No. 20 (Hambleden) (1)
9. No. 21 (Great Marlow) (2)
10. No. 23 (Hedsor & Wooburn) (4)
11. No. 24 (Marlow Urban) (5)
12. Downley (1)
13. Flackwell Heath (2)
14. Hazlemere South (1)
15. Hughenden Valley (1)
16. Icknield (1)
17. Kingshill (1)
18. Lacey Green Speen & The Hampdens (1)
19. Lane End & Piddington (2)
20. Little Marlow (1)
21. Loudwater (1)
22. Naphill-cum-Bradenham (1)
23. The Risboroughs (3)
24. Tylers Green (2)

Wards from 5 May 1983 to 1 May 2003:

Wards from 1 May 2003 to 1 April 2020 (council abolished):

1. Abbey (3)
2. Bledlow & Bradenham (1)
3. Booker & Cressex (2)
4. Bourne End-cum-Hedsor (2)
5. Bowerdean (2)
6. Chiltern Rise (2)
7. Disraeli (2)
8. Downley & Plomer Hill (2)
9. Flackwell Heath & Little Marlow (3)
10. Greater Hughenden (3)
11. Greater Marlow (2)
12. Hambleden Valley (1)
13. Hazlemere North (2)
14. Hazlemere South (2)
15. Icknield (1)
16. Lacey Green, Speen & the Hampdens (1)
17. Marlow North & West (3)
18. Marlow South East (2)
19. Micklefield (2)
20. Oakridge & Castlefield (3)
21. The Risboroughs (3)
22. Ryemead (2)
23. Sands (2)
24. Stokenchurch & Radnage (2)
25. Terriers & Amersham Hill (3)
26. Totteridge (2)
27. Tylers Green & Loudwater (3)
28. The Wooburns (2)

== Electoral wards by constituency ==
Wards as they existed on 1 December 2020.

=== Aylesbury ===
Buckinghamshire: Aston Clinton & Bierton; Aylesbury East; Aylesbury North; Aylesbury North West; Aylesbury South East; Aylesbury South West; Aylesbury West; Ivinghoe; Wing.

=== Beaconsfield ===
Buckinghamshire: Beaconsfield, Cliveden, Denham (polling districts SJ, SJA, SJHD, SK, SKA & SWF); Farnham Common & Burnham Beeches; Flackwell Heath, Little Marlow & Marlow South East; Gerrards Cross (polling districts SB & SFH); Iver; Marlow; Stoke Poges & Wexham; The Wooburns, Bourne End & Hedsor.

=== Buckingham and Bletchley ===
Buckinghamshire: Buckingham East; Buckingham West; Great Brickhill; Winslow.

Milton Keynes: Bletchley East; Bletchley Park; Bletchley West; Tattenhoe.

=== Chesham and Amersham ===
Buckinghamshire: Amersham & Chesham Bois; Chalfont St. Giles; Chalfont St. Peter; Chesham; Chess Valley; Chiltern Ridges (polling districts CD & CDA); Denham (polling district SGE); Gerrards Cross (polling districts SGN & SGS); Hazlemere; Little Chalfont & Amersham Common; Penn Wood & Old Amersham.

=== Mid Buckinghamshire ===
Buckinghamshire: Bernwood; Chiltern Ridges (poling districts CG, CGA, CM, CMA, CMB, CMC & CSB); Great Missenden; Grendon Underwood; Ridgeway East; Ridgeway West; Stone & Waddesdon; The Risboroughs; Wendover, Halton & Stoke Mandeville.

=== Milton Keynes Central ===
Milton Keynes: Broughton; Campbell Park & Old Woughton; Central Milton Keynes; Danesborough & Walton; Loughton & Shenley; Monkston; Shenley Brook End; Woughton & Fishermead..

=== Milton Keynes North ===
Milton Keynes: Bradwell; Newport Pagnell North & Hanslope; Newport Pagnell South; Olney; Stantonbury; Stony Stratford; Wolverton.

=== Wycombe ===
Buckinghamshire: Abbey; Booker, Cressex & Castlefield; Chiltern Villages; Downley; Ryemead & Micklefield; Terriers & Amersham Hill; Totteridge & Bowerdean; Tylers Green & Loudwater; West Wycombe.

== See also ==
- List of parliamentary constituencies in Buckinghamshire
