= Parliamentary constituencies in South East England =

The region of South East England is divided into 91 parliamentary constituencies, which are made up of 27 borough constituencies and 64 county constituencies. Since the general election of July 2024, 35 are represented by Labour MPs, 29 by Conservative MPs, 24 by Liberal Democrat MPs, 1 by a Green MP, 1 by a Reform UK MP, and 1 by an independent MP.

== Constituencies ==
† Conservative ‡ Labour ¤ Liberal Democrat ♣ Green Party # Reform UK § Ind. Network Independent

Constituency (Note: BC denotes borough constituency, CC denotes county constituency.)	Electorate	Majority (Note: The majority is the number of votes the winning candidate receives more than their nearest rival.)	Member of Parliament	Nearest opposition	County	Constituency Map
Aldershot BC	78,569	5,683	Alex Baker‡	Leo Docherty†	Hampshire	
Arundel and South Downs CC	77,969	12,134	Andrew Griffith†	Richard Allen¤	West Sussex	
Ashford CC	76,212	1,779	Sojan Joseph‡	Damian Green†	Kent	
Aylesbury CC	79,169	630	Laura Kyrke-Smith‡	Rob Butler†	Buckinghamshire	
Banbury CC	73,193	3,256	Sean Woodcock‡	Victoria Prentis†	Oxfordshire	
Basingstoke BC	78,487	6,484	Luke Murphy‡	Maria Miller†	Hampshire	
Beaconsfield CC	72,751	5,455	Joy Morrissey†	Anna Crabtree¤	Buckinghamshire	
Bexhill and Battle CC	72,209	2,657	Kieran Mullan†	Christine Bayliss‡	East Sussex	
Bicester and Woodstock CC	74,350	4,958	Calum Miller¤	Rupert Harrison†	Oxfordshire	
Bognor Regis and Littlehampton CC	77,565	1,765	Alison Griffiths†	Clare Walsh‡	West Sussex	
Bracknell CC	71,660	784	Peter Swallow‡	James Sunderland†	Berkshire	
Brighton Kemptown and Peacehaven BC	68,784	9,609	Chris Ward‡	Khobi Vallis†	East Sussex	
Brighton Pavilion BC	74,786	14,290	Siân Berry♣	Tom Gray‡	East Sussex	
Buckingham and Bletchley CC	74,832	2,421	Callum Anderson‡	Iain Stewart†	Buckinghamshire	
Canterbury CC	71,171	8,653	Rosie Duffield (re-elected as Labour)	Louise Harvey-Quirke†	Kent	
Chatham and Aylesford CC	75,109	1,998	Tris Osborne‡	Nathan Gamester†	Kent	
Chesham and Amersham CC	74,889	5,451	Sarah Green¤	Gareth Williams†	Buckinghamshire	
Chichester CC	78,374	12,172	Jess Brown-Fuller¤	Gillian Keegan†	West Sussex	
Crawley BC	75,569	5,235	Peter Lamb‡	Zack Ali†	West Sussex	
Dartford CC	75,426	1,192	Jim Dickson‡	Gareth Johnson†	Kent	
Didcot and Wantage CC	80,689	6,233	Olly Glover¤	David Johnston†	Oxfordshire	
Dorking and Horley CC	71,300	5,391	Chris Coghlan¤	Marisa Heath†	Surrey	
Dover and Deal CC	78,801	7,559	Mike Tapp‡	Howard Cox#	Kent	
Earley and Woodley BC	73,548	848	Yuan Yang‡	Pauline Jorgensen†	Berkshire	
East Grinstead and Uckfield CC	75,385	8,480	Mims Davies†	Benedict Dempsey¤	East Sussex / West Sussex	
East Hampshire CC	71,965	1,275	Damian Hinds†	Dominic Martin¤	Hampshire	
East Surrey CC	73,307	7,450	Claire Coutinho†	Tom Bowell‡	Surrey	
East Thanet CC	74,940	6,971	Polly Billington‡	Helen Harrison†	Kent	
East Worthing and Shoreham CC	74,738	9,519	Tom Rutland‡	Leila Williams†	West Sussex	
Eastbourne BC	72,592	12,204	Josh Babarinde¤	Caroline Ansell†	East Sussex	
Eastleigh BC	69,965	1,546	Liz Jarvis¤	Samuel Joynson†	Hampshire	
Epsom and Ewell BC	77,530	3,686	Helen Maguire¤	Mhairi Fraser†	Surrey	
Esher and Walton BC	74,042	12,003	Monica Harding¤	John Cope†	Surrey	
Fareham and Waterlooville CC	77,691	6,079	Suella Braverman# (re-elected as a Conservative)	Gemma Furnivall‡	Hampshire	
Farnham and Bordon CC	75,918	1,349	Greg Stafford†	Khalil Yousuf¤	Hampshire / Surrey	
Faversham and Mid Kent CC	74,301	1,469	Helen Whately†	Mel Dawkins‡	Kent	
Folkestone and Hythe CC	70,056	3,729	Tony Vaughan‡	Damian Collins†	Kent	
Gillingham and Rainham BC	73,523	3,972	Naushabah Khan‡	Rehman Chishti†	Kent	
Godalming and Ash CC	74,168	891	Jeremy Hunt†	Paul Follows¤	Surrey	
Gosport BC	73,261	6,066	Caroline Dinenage†	Edward Batterbury‡	Hampshire	
Gravesham CC	73,088	2,712	Lauren Sullivan‡	Adam Holloway†	Kent	
Guildford CC	70,734	8,429	Zöe Franklin¤	Angela Richardson†	Surrey	
Hamble Valley CC	80,537	4,802	Paul Holmes†	Prad Bains¤	Hampshire	
Hastings and Rye CC	75,939	8,653	Helena Dollimore‡	Sally-Ann Hart†	East Sussex	
Havant BC	72,346	92	Alan Mak†	Stefanie Harvey‡	Hampshire	
Henley and Thame CC	73,749	6,267	Freddie van Mierlo¤	Caroline Newton†	Oxfordshire	
Herne Bay and Sandwich CC	77,841	2,499	Roger Gale†	Helen Whitehead‡	Kent	
Horsham CC	79,150	2,517	John Milne¤	Jeremy Quin†	West Sussex	
Hove and Portslade BC	74,063	19,881	Peter Kyle‡	Sophie Broadbent♣	East Sussex	
Isle of Wight East CC	55,855	3,323	Joe Robertson†	Sarah Morris#	Isle of Wight	
Isle of Wight West CC	55,406	3,177	Richard Quigley‡	Bob Seely†	Isle of Wight	
Lewes CC	76,166	12,624	James MacCleary¤	Maria Caulfield†	East Sussex	
Maidenhead CC	75,687	2,963	Joshua Reynolds¤	Tania Mathias†	Berkshire	
Maidstone and Malling CC	76,449	1,674	Helen Grant†	Maureen Cleator‡	Kent	
Mid Buckinghamshire CC	75,415	5,872	Greg Smith†	Anja Schaefer¤	Buckinghamshire	
Mid Sussex CC	75,969	6,662	Alison Bennett¤	Kristy Adams†	West Sussex	
Milton Keynes Central BC	81,078	7,291	Emily Darlington‡	Johnny Luk†	Buckinghamshire	
Milton Keynes North CC	70,709	5,430	Chris Curtis‡	Ben Everitt†	Buckinghamshire	
New Forest East CC	70,618	8,495	Julian Lewis†	Sasjkia Otto‡	Hampshire	
New Forest West CC	68,644	5,600	Desmond Swayne†	Sally Johnston‡	Hampshire	
Newbury CC	71,986	2,377	Lee Dillon¤	Laura Farris†	Berkshire	
North East Hampshire CC	76,975	634	Alex Brewer¤	Ranil Jayawardena†	Hampshire	
North West Hampshire CC	78,629	3,288	Kit Malthouse†	Andy Fitchet‡	Hampshire	
Oxford East BC	71,845	14,465	Anneliese Dodds‡	Sushila Dhall♣	Oxfordshire	
Oxford West and Abingdon CC	71,318	14,894	Layla Moran¤	Vinay Raniga†	Oxfordshire	
Portsmouth North BC	70,446	780	Amanda Martin‡	Penny Mordaunt†	Hampshire	
Portsmouth South BC	73,711	13,155	Stephen Morgan‡	Mark Zimmer#	Hampshire	
Reading Central BC	73,600	12,637	Matt Rodda‡	Raj Singh†	Berkshire	
Reading West and Mid Berkshire CC	68,786	1,361	Olivia Bailey‡	Ross Mackinnon†	Berkshire	
Reigate BC	77,101	3,187	Rebecca Paul†	Stuart Brady‡	Surrey	
Rochester and Strood CC	74,257	2,293	Lauren Edwards‡	Kelly Tolhurst†	Kent	
Romsey and Southampton North CC	71,871	2,191	Caroline Nokes†	Geoff Cooper¤	Hampshire	
Runnymede and Weybridge CC	73,610	7,627	Ben Spencer†	Ellen Nicholson¤	Surrey	
Sevenoaks CC	73,708	5,440	Laura Trott†	Richard Streatfeild¤	Kent	
Sittingbourne and Sheppey CC	79,067	355	Kevin McKenna‡	Aisha Cuthbert†	Kent	
Slough BC	81,512	3,647	Tan Dhesi‡	Azhar Chohan§	Berkshire	
Southampton Itchen BC	68,379	6,105	Darren Paffey‡	Sidney Yankson†	Hampshire	
Southampton Test BC	65,520	9,333	Satvir Kaur‡	Ben Burcombe-Filer†	Hampshire	
Spelthorne BC	73,782	1,590	Lincoln Jopp†	Claire Tighe‡	Surrey	
Surrey Heath CC	71,934	5,640	Al Pinkerton¤	Ed McGuinness†	Surrey	
Sussex Weald CC	72,897	6,842	Nus Ghani†	Danielle Newson¤	East Sussex	
Tonbridge CC	72,799	11,166	Tom Tugendhat†	Lewis Bailey‡	Kent	
Tunbridge Wells CC	78,738	8,687	Mike Martin¤	Neil Mahapatra†	Kent	
Weald of Kent CC	75,988	8,422	Katie Lam†	Lenny Rolles‡	Kent	
Winchester CC	78,289	13,821	Danny Chambers¤	Flick Drummond†	Hampshire	
Windsor CC	73,334	6,457	Jack Rankin†	Pavitar Mann‡	Berkshire	
Witney CC	75,448	4,339	Charlie Maynard¤	Robert Courts†	Oxfordshire	
Woking CC	72,977	11,246	Will Forster¤	Jonathan Lord†	Surrey	
Wokingham CC	75,082	8,345	Clive Jones¤	Lucy Demery†	Berkshire	
Worthing West BC	77,038	3,949	Beccy Cooper‡	Peter Bottomley†	West Sussex	
Wycombe CC	73,846	4,591	Emma Reynolds‡	Steve Baker†	Buckinghamshire	

== 2023 boundary changes ==
See 2023 Periodic Review of Westminster constituencies for further details.

Following the abandonment of the Sixth Periodic Review (the 2018 review), the Boundary Commission for England formally launched the 2023 Review on 5 January 2021. The Commission calculated that the number of seats to be allocated to the South East region would be increased by 7 from 84 to 91. This includes the Isle of Wight which will have two protected seats, compared to one at present. Initial proposals were published on 8 June 2021 and, following two periods of public consultation, revised proposals were published on 8 November 2022. The final proposals were published on 28 June 2023.

Under proposals, the following constituencies for the region came into effect at the 2024 general election:

Constituency	Electorate	Ceremonial county	Local authority
Aldershot BC	76,765	Hampshire	Hart / Rushmoor
Arundel and South Downs CC	76,974	West Sussex	Arun / Chichester / Horsham
Ashford CC	73,546	Kent	Ashford / Folkestone and Hythe
Aylesbury CC	75,636	Buckinghamshire	Buckinghamshire
Banbury CC	69,943	Oxfordshire	Cherwell / West Oxfordshire
Basingstoke BC	77,050	Hampshire	Basingstoke and Deane
Beaconsfield CC	72,315	Buckinghamshire	Buckinghamshire
Bexhill and Battle CC	70,869	East Sussex	Rother / Wealden
Bicester and Woodstock CC	70,389	Oxfordshire	Cherwell / West Oxfordshire
Bognor Regis and Littlehampton CC	76,985	West Sussex	Arun
Bracknell BC	70,247	Berkshire	Bracknell Forest
Brighton Kemptown and Peacehaven BC	69,865	East Sussex	Brighton and Hove / Lewes
Brighton Pavilion BC	75,722	East Sussex	Brighton and Hove
Buckingham and Bletchley CC	73,644	Buckinghamshire	Buckinghamshire / Milton Keynes
Canterbury CC	75,499	Kent	Canterbury
Chatham and Aylesford CC	74,840	Kent	Medway / Tonbridge and Malling
Chesham and Amersham CC	74,155	Buckinghamshire	Buckinghamshire
Chichester CC	76,785	West Sussex	Arun / Chichester
Crawley BC	74,446	West Sussex	Crawley
Dartford CC	72,048	Kent	Dartford
Didcot and Wantage CC	74,456	Oxfordshire	South Oxfordshire / Vale of White Horse
Dorking and Horley CC	70,317	Surrey	Mole Valley / Reigate and Banstead
Dover and Deal CC	75,855	Kent	Dover
Earley and Woodley BC	70,083	Berkshire	Reading / Wokingham
East Grinstead and Uckfield CC	72,356	East Sussex / West Sussex	Lewes / Mid Sussex / Wealden
East Hampshire CC	69,959	Hampshire	East Hampshire
East Surrey CC	73,145	Surrey	Reigate and Banstead / Tandridge
East Thanet BC	73,790	Kent	Thanet
East Worthing and Shoreham BC	75,466	West Sussex	Adur / Worthing
Eastbourne BC	73,322	East Sussex	Eastbourne
Eastleigh BC	69,982	Hampshire	Eastleigh / Test Valley
Epsom and Ewell BC	76,844	Surrey	Epsom and Ewell / Mole Valley
Esher and Walton BC	73,280	Surrey	Elmbridge
Fareham and Waterlooville CC	77,036	Hampshire	Fareham / Havant / Winchester
Farnham and Bordon CC	72,938	Hampshire / Surrey	East Hampshire / Waverley
Faversham and Mid Kent CC	71,798	Kent	Maidstone / Swale
Folkestone and Hythe CC	70,023	Kent	Folkestone and Hythe
Gillingham and Rainham BC	73,951	Kent	Medway
Godalming and Ash CC	71,399	Surrey	Guildford / Waverley
Gosport BC	73,763	Hampshire	Fareham / Gosport
Gravesham CC	72,866	Kent	Gravesham
Guildford CC	71,367	Surrey	Guildford
Hamble Valley CC	76,902	Hampshire	Eastleigh / Fareham / Winchester
Hastings and Rye CC	75,581	East Sussex	Hastings / Rother
Havant BC	72,766	Hampshire	Havant
Henley and Thame CC	70,626	Oxfordshire	South Oxfordshire
Herne Bay and Sandwich CC	76,028	Kent	Canterbury / Dover / Thanet
Horsham CC	76,981	West Sussex	Horsham
Hove and Portslade BC	73,726	East Sussex	Brighton and Hove
Isle of Wight East CC	56,805	Isle of Wight	Isle of Wight
Isle of Wight West CC	54,911	Isle of Wight	Isle of Wight
Lewes CC	75,091	East Sussex	Lewes / Wealden
Maidenhead CC	73,463	Berkshire	Bracknell Forest / Windsor and Maidenhead
Maidstone and Malling CC	73,084	Kent	Maidstone / Tonbridge and Malling
Mid Buckinghamshire CC	72,240	Buckinghamshire	Buckinghamshire
Mid Sussex CC	72,255	West Sussex	Mid Sussex
Milton Keynes North CC	70,620	Buckinghamshire	Milton Keynes
Milton Keynes Central BC	76,708	Buckinghamshire	Milton Keynes
New Forest East CC	73,823	Hampshire	New Forest
New Forest West CC	71,009	Hampshire	New Forest
Newbury CC	71,631	Berkshire	West Berkshire
North East Hampshire CC	73,306	Hampshire	Basingstoke and Deane / Hart
North West Hampshire CC	76,004	Hampshire	Basingstoke and Deane / Test Valley
Oxford East BC	72,731	Oxfordshire	Oxford
Oxford West and Abingdon CC	72,004	Oxfordshire	Oxford / Vale of White Horse
Portsmouth North BC	71,844	Hampshire	Portsmouth
Portsmouth South BC	74,253	Hampshire	Portsmouth
Reading Central BC	71,283	Berkshire	Reading
Reading West and Mid Berkshire CC	69,999	Berkshire	Reading / West Berkshire
Reigate CC	76,139	Surrey	Reigate and Banstead
Rochester and Strood CC	72,155	Kent	Medway
Romsey and Southampton North CC	73,831	Hampshire	Southampton / Test Valley
Runnymede and Weybridge CC	73,778	Surrey	Elmbridge / Runnymede
Sevenoaks CC	73,684	Kent	Dartford / Sevenoaks
Sittingbourne and Sheppey CC	76,818	Kent	Swale
Slough BC	75,287	Berkshire	Slough
Southampton Itchen BC	72,150	Hampshire	Southampton
Southampton Test BC	69,960	Hampshire	Southampton
Spelthorne BC	72,897	Surrey	Spelthorne
Surrey Heath CC	70,825	Surrey	Guildford / Surrey Heath
Sussex Weald CC	70,075	East Sussex	Wealden
Tonbridge CC	73,692	Kent	Sevenoaks / Tonbridge and Malling
Tunbridge Wells CC	75,213	Kent	Tunbridge Wells
Weald of Kent CC	70,110	Kent	Ashford / Maidstone / Tunbridge Wells
Winchester CC	76,577	Hampshire	Winchester
Windsor CC	74,338	Berkshire / Surrey	Runnymede / Slough / Windsor and Maidenhead
Witney CC	70,042	Oxfordshire	Vale of White Horse / West Oxfordshire
Woking BC	71,737	Surrey	Woking
Wokingham CC	70,235	Berkshire	Wokingham
Worthing West BC	76,293	West Sussex	Adur / Worthing
Wycombe CC	71,769	Buckinghamshire	Buckinghamshire

== 2024 results ==
The number of votes cast for each political party who fielded candidates in constituencies comprising the South East region in the 2024 general election were as follows:

Party	Votes	%	Change from 2019	Seats	Change from 2019 (actual)	Change from 2019 (notional)
Conservative	1,332,755	30.6	▼23.4	30	▼44	▼51
Labour	1,067,897	24.5	▲2.4	36	▲28	▲28
Liberal Democrats	951,222	21.9	▲3.6	24	▲23	▲23
Reform UK	609,281	14.0	▲13.7	0	0	0
Green	299,665	6.9	▲2.9	1	0	0
Others	90,596	2.1	▲0.7	0	0	0
Total	4,351,416	100.0		91	▲7	

== Results history ==
Primary data source: House of Commons research briefing - General election results from 1918 to 2019 (2024 as above)

=== Percentage votes ===
South East votes %

Key:

- CON - Conservative Party, including National Liberal Party up to 1966
- LAB - Labour Party, including Labour and Co-operative Party
- LIB - Liberal Party up to 1979; SDP-Liberal Alliance 1983 & 1987; Liberal Democrats from 1992
- UKIP - UK Independence Party 2010 to 2017 (included in Other up to 2005 and from 2019)
- REF - Reform UK (Brexit Party in 2019)
- GRN - Green Party of England and Wales (included in Other up to 2005)

=== Seats ===
South East seats

Key:

- CON - Conservative Party, including National Liberal Party up to 1966 (2010-2017 - includes The Speaker, John Bercow)
- LAB - Labour Party, including Labour and Co-operative Party
- LIB - Liberal Party up to 1979; SDP-Liberal Alliance 1983 & 1987; Liberal Democrats from 1992
- GRN - Green Party of England and Wales
- OTH - 2010-2017 - Speaker (John Bercow)

== See also ==
- List of United Kingdom Parliament constituencies
- Parliamentary constituencies in Berkshire
- Parliamentary constituencies in Buckinghamshire
- Parliamentary constituencies in East Sussex
- Parliamentary constituencies in Hampshire
- Parliamentary constituencies in the Isle of Wight:
  - Isle of Wight East
  - Isle of Wight West
- Parliamentary constituencies in Kent
- Parliamentary constituencies in Oxfordshire
- Parliamentary constituencies in Surrey
- Parliamentary constituencies in West Sussex
