= Chris Curtis =

Chris Curtis may refer to:

- Chris Curtis (fighter) (born 1987), American MMA fighter
- Chris Curtis (musician) (1941–2005), British drummer and singer, best known for being with The Searchers
- Chris Curtis (politician) (born 1994), British Member of Parliament
