= Buckingham and Bletchley =

UK Parliament constituency (since 2024)

Coordinates: 51.97°N 0.87°W

- County constituency for the House of Commons
- Interactive map of boundaries from 2024
- Boundary of Buckingham and Bletchley in South East England
- County: Buckinghamshire
- Electorate: 73,644 (2023)
- Major settlements: Bletchley, Buckingham, Tingewick, Winslow, Fenny Stratford

Current constituency
- Created: 2024
- Member of Parliament: Callum Anderson (Labour)
- Seats: One
- Created from: Buckingham & Milton Keynes South (part)

Buckingham and Bletchley is a constituency of the House of Commons in the UK Parliament. Created as a result of the 2023 review of Westminster constituencies, it was first contested in the 2024 general election. Since that election, it has been represented by Callum Anderson of the Labour Party.

== Constituency profile ==
The Buckingham and Bletchley constituency is located in Buckinghamshire. Bletchley is the constituency's largest settlement with a population of around 40,000 and forms part of the Milton Keynes urban area. The constituency also includes Buckingham, the traditional county town, and the small market town of Winslow. The rest of the constituency is predominantly rural and agricultural, and contains many smaller villages. Most of the constituency is affluent, although there is some nationally significant deprivation in parts of Bletchley.

Levels of education and professional employment in the constituency are similar to national averages, and household income is high. White people make up 80% of the population with Asians being the largest ethnic minority group at 9%. Since the 2026 local elections, Bletchley is mostly represented by the Reform UK party at the local council level, whilst the rest of the constituency is predominantly represented by Conservatives. An estimated 53% of voters in Buckingham and Bletchley supported leaving the European Union in the 2016 referendum, a similar proportion to the country as a whole.

== Boundaries ==
The constituency is composed of the following:

- The District of Buckinghamshire wards of: Buckingham; Grendon Underwood (part); Horwood; Newton Longville; Quainton (part); Winslow.
- The City of Milton Keynes wards of: Bletchley East; Bletchley Park; Bletchley West; Tattenhoe.

The constituency comprises the following areas:

- The town of Buckingham and surrounding rural areas (Great Brickhill and Winslow wards), transferred from the constituency of Buckingham (abolished, with remaining areas included in the new seat of Mid Buckinghamshire, or transferred to Aylesbury)
- The City of Milton Keynes communities of Bletchley, Fenny Stratford and Tattenhoe, transferred from the abolished constituency of Milton Keynes South (most of which became Milton Keynes Central).

== Members of Parliament ==
Buckingham prior to 2024

Election	Member	Party
2024	Callum Anderson	Labour

== Elections ==
=== Elections in the 2020s ===
General election 2024: Buckingham and Bletchley
Party	Candidate	Votes	%	±%
Labour	Callum Anderson	17,602	36.9	+9.2
Conservative	Iain Stewart	15,181	31.9	−21.2
Reform	Jordan Cattell	7,468	15.7	+14.7
Liberal Democrats	Dominic Dyer	4,300	9.0	−6.4
Green	Amanda Onwuemene	2,590	5.4	+4.2
Independent	Ray Brady	500	1.0	N/A
Majority		2,421	5.0	N/A
Turnout		47,641	63.7	–7.7
Registered electors		74,832		
Labour gain from Conservative		Swing	+15.2	

Iain Stewart was standing for re-election to the House of Commons, having been the incumbent MP for Milton Keynes South, one of the predecessor constituencies of Buckingham and Bletchley.

=== Elections in the 2010s ===
2019 notional result
Party	Vote	%
Conservative	27,912	53.1
Labour	14,567	27.7
Liberal Democrats	8,118	15.4
Others	875	1.7
Green	629	1.2
Brexit Party	508	1.0
Turnout	52,609	71.4
Electorate	73,644	

== See also ==
- Milton Keynes Central (constituency)
- Milton Keynes North
- List of parliamentary constituencies in Buckinghamshire
- List of parliamentary constituencies in the South East England (region)
