= Constituencies of the Parliament of the United Kingdom =

Electoral divisions of the parliament of the United Kingdom

United Kingdom parliamentary constituencies
- Constituencies after the 2023 Periodic Review
- Category: Electoral district
- Location: United Kingdom
- Number: 650 (as of 2023)
- Government: House of Commons

The Parliament of the United Kingdom currently has 650 parliamentary constituencies across the constituent countries (England, Scotland, Wales, and Northern Ireland), each electing a single member of parliament (MP) to the House of Commons by the plurality (first-past-the-post) voting system, ordinarily every five years. Voting last took place in all 650 of those constituencies at the United Kingdom general election on 4 July 2024.

The number of seats rose from 646 to 650 at the 2010 general election after proposals made by the boundary commissions for England, Wales, and Northern Ireland (the Fifth Periodic Review of Westminster constituencies) were adopted through statutory instruments. Constituencies in Scotland remained unchanged at the 2010 election, as the Boundary Commission for Scotland had completed a review just before the 2005 general election, which had resulted in a reduction of 13 seats.

The most recent boundary review was conducted in 2023, with changes to the boundaries of constituencies across the UK. As part of the review to reflect population changes, England gained ten seats, while Wales lost eight seats, and Scotland lost two seats, while Northern Ireland's number of seats remained the same.

Primary legislation provides for the independence of the boundary commissions for each of the four parts of the UK, the number of seats for each of the countries, permissible factors to use in departing from any old boundaries, and a strong duty to consult. The Fifth Review was governed by the Parliamentary Constituencies Act of 1986. Under the Parliamentary Voting System and Constituencies Act 2011, as amended by the Parliamentary Constituencies Act 2020, the number of MPs is now fixed at 650. The Sainte-Laguë formula method is used to form groups of seats split between the four parts of the United Kingdom and the English regions (as defined by the NUTS 1 statistical regions of England).

== Overview ==
The table below gives the number of eligible voters broken down by constituent country, including the average constituency size in each country.

Year	2000		2010		2015		2017		2019	
Year	Numbers	%	Numbers	%	Numbers	%	Numbers	%	Numbers	%
Total electorate for each constituent country
England	36,994,681	83.47%	38,432,802	83.81%	38,736,146	83.57%	38,693,900	83.85%	39,901,035	83.88%
Scotland	3,995,489	9.02%	3,929,956	8.57%	4,099,532	8.84%	3,950,600	8.56%	4,053,056	8.52%
Wales	2,225,689	5.02%	2,302,300	5.02%	2,281,754	4.92%	2,261,200	4.90%	2,319,690	4.88%
Northern Ireland	1,103,670	2.49%	1,190,635	2.60%	1,236,765	2.67%	1,242,300	2.69%	1,293,971	2.72%
UK total	44,319,529	—	45,855,693	—	46,354,197	—	46,148,000	—	47,567,752	—
Average electorate per constituency for each constituent country
England	69,408	101.80%	72,107	102.21%	72,676	101.91%	72,596	102.25%	74,861	102.30%
Scotland	67,720	99.32%	66,609	94.42%	69,484	97.43%	66,959	94.31%	68,696	93.87%
Wales	55,642	81.61%	57,558	81.59%	57,044	79.99%	56,530	79.62%	57,992	79.24%
Northern Ireland	61,315	89.93%	66,146	93.76%	68,709	96.35%	69,017	97.21%	71,887	98.23%
Overall UK average	68,184	—	70,547	—	71,314	—	70,997	—	73,181	—

As of 2023, every recommended constituency must have an electorate as at 2 March 2020 that is no smaller than 69,724 and no larger than 77,062. The exceptions to this rule are five "protected" constituencies for island areas: Orkney and Shetland, Na h-Eileanan an Iar, Ynys Mon, and two constituencies on the Isle of Wight. These consequently have smaller electorates than the lower limit for other constituencies.

=== Geographical size of constituencies ===
The UK's smallest constituency: Bethnal Green and Stepney

Largest and smallest constituencies by UK nation (2024)
	Largest	Smallest
England	Hexham 2,774 square kilometres (1,071 sq mi)	Bethnal Green and Stepney 6.13 square kilometres (2.37 sq mi)
Scotland	Caithness, Sutherland and Easter Ross 11,636 square kilometres (4,493 sq mi)	Glasgow West 18.66 square kilometres (7.20 sq mi)
Wales	Brecon, Radnor and Cwm Tawe 3,095 square kilometres (1,195 sq mi)	Cardiff East 28.68 square kilometres (11.07 sq mi)
Northern Ireland	Fermanagh and South Tyrone 2,561 square kilometres (989 sq mi)	Belfast North 38.34 square kilometres (14.80 sq mi)

== Parliamentary constituencies in the United Kingdom ==
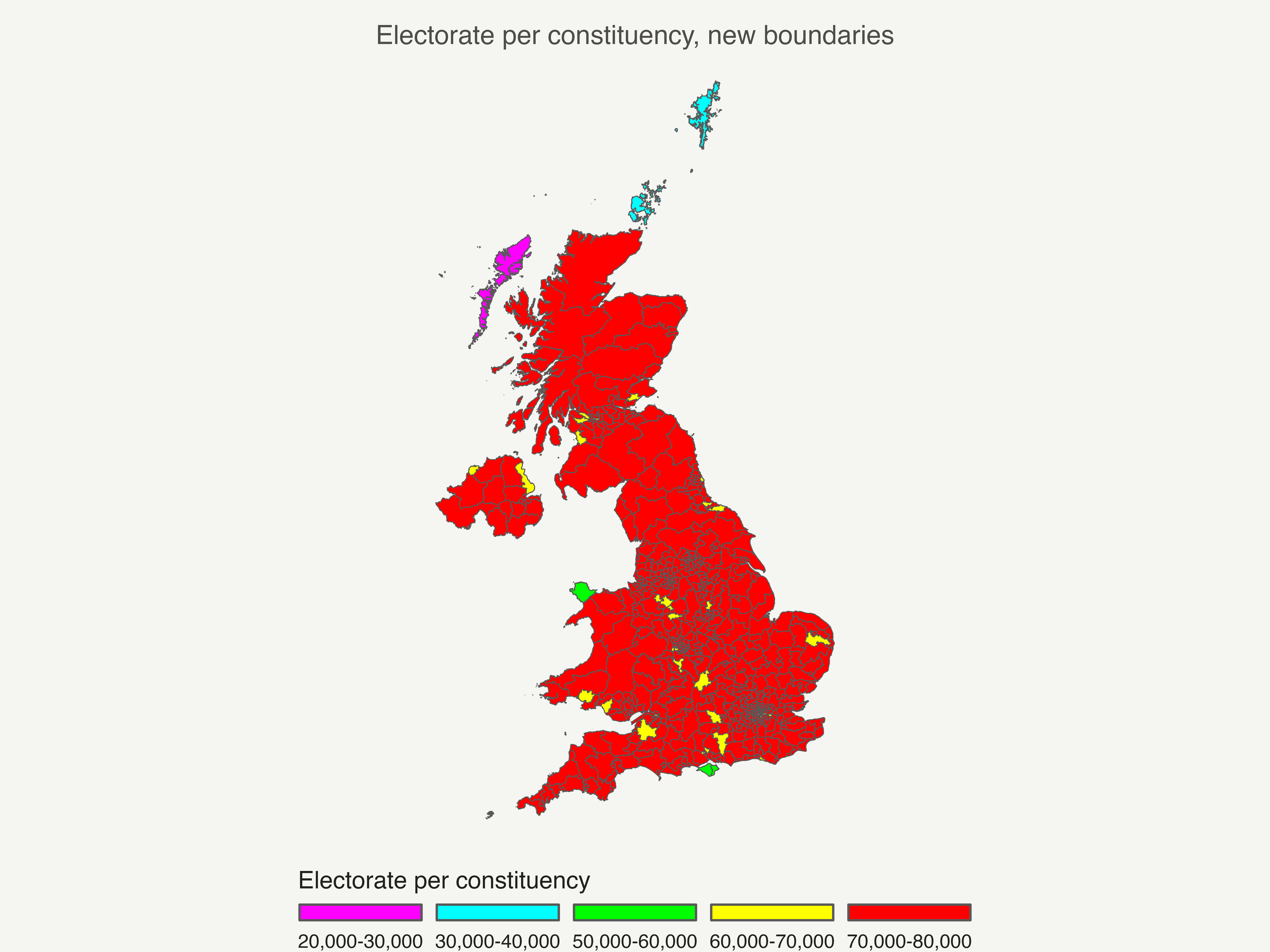
Size of electorate in each constituency

As of the 2024 election there are 543 constituencies in England, 32 in Wales, 57 in Scotland and 18 in Northern Ireland.

=== England ===
The "Region" of the table refers to the NUTS 1 statistical region of England, which coincides with the former European Parliament constituency in which the constituency was included until 31 January 2020.

Constituencies in England from June 2024
Constituency	Electorate March 2020	Ceremonial county	Region
Aldershot	76,765	Hampshire	South East
Aldridge-Brownhills	73,122	West Midlands	West Midlands
Altrincham and Sale West	73,934	Greater Manchester	North West
Amber Valley	70,625	Derbyshire	East Midlands
Arundel and South Downs	76,974	West Sussex	South East
Ashfield	69,819	Nottinghamshire	East Midlands
Ashford	73,546	Kent	South East
Ashton-under-Lyne	72,278	Greater Manchester	North West
Aylesbury	75,636	Buckinghamshire	South East
Banbury	69,943	Oxfordshire	South East
Barking	71,822	London (Barking and Dagenham)	London
Barnsley North	76,794	South Yorkshire	Yorkshire and the Humber
Barnsley South	75,896	South Yorkshire	Yorkshire and the Humber
Barrow and Furness	76,603	Cumbria	North West
Basildon and Billericay	76,993	Essex	Eastern
Basingstoke	77,050	Hampshire	South East
Bassetlaw	75,773	Nottinghamshire	East Midlands
Bath	73,241	Somerset	South West
Battersea	71,949	London (Wandsworth)	London
Beaconsfield	72,315	Buckinghamshire	South East
Beckenham and Penge	76,625	London (Bromley)	London
Bedford	70,068	Bedfordshire	Eastern
Bermondsey and Old Southwark	70,602	London (Southwark)	London
Bethnal Green and Stepney	77,000	London (Tower Hamlets)	London
Beverley and Holderness	71,102	East Riding of Yorkshire	Yorkshire and the Humber
Bexhill and Battle	70,869	East Sussex	South East
Bexleyheath and Crayford	69,948	London (Bexley)	London
Bicester and Woodstock	70,389	Oxfordshire	South East
Birkenhead	76,271	Merseyside	North West
Birmingham Edgbaston	71,354	West Midlands	West Midlands
Birmingham Erdington	76,856	West Midlands	West Midlands
Birmingham Hall Green and Moseley	75,781	West Midlands	West Midlands
Birmingham Hodge Hill and Solihull North	76,922	West Midlands	West Midlands
Birmingham Ladywood	76,585	West Midlands	West Midlands
Birmingham Northfield	73,483	West Midlands	West Midlands
Birmingham Perry Barr	74,048	West Midlands	West Midlands
Birmingham Selly Oak	76,285	West Midlands	West Midlands
Birmingham Yardley	71,912	West Midlands	West Midlands
Bishop Auckland	70,879	County Durham	North East
Blackburn	70,586	Lancashire	North West
Blackley and Middleton South	71,375	Greater Manchester	North West
Blackpool North and Fleetwood	75,396	Lancashire	North West
Blackpool South	76,071	Lancashire	North West
Blaydon and Consett	70,163	County Durham; Tyne and Wear	North East
Blyth and Ashington	75,452	Northumberland	North East
Bognor Regis and Littlehampton	76,985	West Sussex	South East
Bolsover	74,680	Derbyshire	East Midlands
Bolton North East	77,020	Greater Manchester	North West
Bolton South and Walkden	75,716	Greater Manchester	North West
Bolton West	72,125	Greater Manchester	North West
Bootle	75,194	Merseyside	North West
Boston and Skegness	75,806	Lincolnshire	East Midlands
Bournemouth East	73,173	Dorset	South West
Bournemouth West	72,094	Dorset	South West
Bracknell	70,247	Berkshire	South East
Bradford East	72,150	West Yorkshire	Yorkshire and the Humber
Bradford South	70,890	West Yorkshire	Yorkshire and the Humber
Bradford West	71,258	West Yorkshire	Yorkshire and the Humber
Braintree	75,662	Essex	Eastern
Brent East	75,880	London (Brent)	London
Brent West	76,463	London (Brent)	London
Brentford and Isleworth	76,354	London (Hounslow; Richmond upon Thames)	London
Brentwood and Ongar	74,937	Essex	Eastern
Bridgwater	71,418	Somerset	South West
Bridlington and The Wolds	72,501	East Riding of Yorkshire	Yorkshire and the Humber
Brigg and Immingham	71,628	Lincolnshire	Yorkshire and the Humber
Brighton Kemptown and Peacehaven	69,865	East Sussex	South East
Brighton Pavilion	75,722	East Sussex	South East
Bristol Central	70,227	Somerset	South West
Bristol East	75,936	Somerset	South West
Bristol North East	69,793	Bristol; Gloucestershire	South West
Bristol North West	76,783	Bristol	South West
Bristol South	74,696	Bristol	South West
Broadland and Fakenham	72,907	Norfolk	Eastern
Bromley and Biggin Hill	70,418	London (Bromley)	London
Bromsgrove	75,305	Worcestershire	West Midlands
Broxbourne	75,454	Hertfordshire	Eastern
Broxtowe	72,461	Nottinghamshire	East Midlands
Buckingham and Bletchley	73,644	Buckinghamshire	South East
Burnley	75,436	Lancashire	North West
Burton and Uttoxeter	75,460	Staffordshire	West Midlands
Bury North	77,009	Greater Manchester	North West
Bury South	74,598	Greater Manchester	North West
Bury St Edmunds and Stowmarket	75,655	Suffolk	Eastern
Calder Valley	75,987	West Yorkshire	Yorkshire and the Humber
Camborne and Redruth	73,568	Cornwall	South West
Cambridge	72,560	Cambridgeshire	Eastern
Cannock Chase	75,582	Staffordshire	West Midlands
Canterbury	75,499	Kent	South East
Carlisle	75,868	Cumbria	North West
Carshalton and Wallington	72,755	London (Sutton)	London
Castle Point	70,923	Essex	Eastern
Central Devon	73,491	Devon	South West
Central Suffolk and North Ipswich	71,020	Suffolk	Eastern
Chatham and Aylesford	74,840	Kent	South East
Cheadle	73,775	Greater Manchester	North West
Chelmsford	76,454	Essex	Eastern
Chelsea and Fulham	76,481	London (Hammersmith and Fulham; Kensington and Chelsea)	London
Cheltenham	75,292	Gloucestershire	South West
Chesham and Amersham	74,155	Buckinghamshire	South East
Chester North and Neston	72,327	Cheshire	North West
Chester South and Eddisbury	71,975	Cheshire	North West
Chesterfield	70,722	Derbyshire	East Midlands
Chichester	76,765	West Sussex	South East
Chingford and Woodford Green	75,677	London (Redbridge; Waltham Forest)	London
Chippenham	71,648	Wiltshire	South West
Chipping Barnet	76,187	London (Barnet)	London
Chorley	74,568	Lancashire	North West
Christchurch	71,598	Dorset	South West
Cities of London and Westminster	73,140	London (City; Westminster)	London
City of Durham	72,878	County Durham	North East
Clacton	75,959	Essex	Eastern
Clapham and Brixton Hill	75,460	London (Lambeth)	London
Colchester	76,843	Essex	Eastern
Colne Valley	71,518	West Yorkshire	Yorkshire and the Humber
Congleton	69,836	Cheshire	North West
Corby and East Northamptonshire	76,748	Northamptonshire	East Midlands
Coventry East	73,389	West Midlands	West Midlands
Coventry North West	73,431	West Midlands	West Midlands
Coventry South	70,998	West Midlands	West Midlands
Cramlington and Killingworth	73,295	Northumberland; Tyne and Wear	North East
Crawley	74,446	West Sussex	South East
Crewe and Nantwich	76,236	Cheshire	North West
Croydon East	75,346	London (Croydon)	London
Croydon South	71,541	London (Croydon)	London
Croydon West	70,812	London (Croydon)	London
Dagenham and Rainham	73,627	London (Barking and Dagenham; Havering)	London
Darlington	70,446	County Durham	North East
Dartford	72,048	Kent	South East
Daventry	76,539	Northamptonshire	East Midlands
Derby North	71,876	Derbyshire	East Midlands
Derby South	72,067	Derbyshire	East Midlands
Derbyshire Dales	71,435	Derbyshire	East Midlands
Dewsbury and Batley	70,226	West Yorkshire	Yorkshire and the Humber
Didcot and Wantage	74,356	Oxfordshire	South East
Doncaster Central	75,007	South Yorkshire	Yorkshire and the Humber
Doncaster East and the Isle of Axholme	70,113	Lincolnshire; South Yorkshire	Yorkshire and the Humber
Doncaster North	71,739	South Yorkshire	Yorkshire and the Humber
Dorking and Horley	70,317	Surrey	South East
Dover and Deal	75,855	Kent	South East
Droitwich and Evesham	74,345	Worcestershire	West Midlands
Dudley	71,083	West Midlands	West Midlands
Dulwich and West Norwood	74,314	London (Lambeth; Southwark)	London
Dunstable and Leighton Buzzard	74,069	Bedfordshire	Eastern
Ealing Central and Acton	75,399	London (Ealing; Hammersmith and Fulham)	London
Ealing North	72,985	London (Ealing)	London
Ealing Southall	75,085	London (Ealing)	London
Earley and Woodley	70,083	Berkshire	South East
Easington	70,043	County Durham	North East
East Grinstead and Uckfield	72,356	East Sussex; West Sussex	South East
East Ham	70,902	London (Newham)	London
East Hampshire	69,959	Hampshire	South East
East Surrey	73,145	Surrey	South East
East Thanet	73,790	Kent	South East
East Wiltshire	71,109	Wiltshire	South West
East Worthing and Shoreham	75,466	West Sussex	South East
Eastbourne	73,322	East Sussex	South East
Eastleigh	69,982	Hampshire	South East
Edmonton and Winchmore Hill	75,204	London (Enfield)	London
Ellesmere Port and Bromborough	71,027	Cheshire; Merseyside	North West
Eltham and Chislehurst	74,179	London (Bromley; Greenwich)	London
Ely and East Cambridgeshire	76,279	Cambridgeshire	Eastern
Enfield North	76,824	London (Enfield)	London
Epping Forest	74,553	Essex	Eastern
Epsom and Ewell	76,844	Surrey	South East
Erewash	71,986	Derbyshire	East Midlands
Erith and Thamesmead	76,728	London (Bexley; Greenwich)	London
Esher and Walton	73,280	Surrey	South East
Exeter	71,713	Devon	South West
Exmouth and Exeter East	74,502	Devon	South West
Fareham and Waterlooville	77,036	Hampshire	South East
Farnham and Bordon	72,938	Hampshire; Surrey	South East
Faversham and Mid Kent	71,798	Kent	South East
Feltham and Heston	75,226	London (Hounslow)	London
Filton and Bradley Stoke	73,598	Gloucestershire	South West
Finchley and Golders Green	75,761	London (Barnet)	London
Folkestone and Hythe	70,023	Kent	South East
Forest of Dean	71,510	Gloucestershire	South West
Frome and East Somerset	70,177	Somerset	South West
Fylde	75,114	Lancashire	North West
Gainsborough	74,750	Lincolnshire	East Midlands
Gateshead Central and Whickham	70,994	Tyne and Wear	North East
Gedling	75,795	Nottinghamshire	East Midlands
Gillingham and Rainham	73,951	Kent	South East
Glastonbury and Somerton	70,015	Somerset	South West
Gloucester	76,695	Gloucestershire	South West
Godalming and Ash	71,399	Surrey	South East
Goole and Pocklington	76,337	East Riding of Yorkshire	Yorkshire and the Humber
Gorton and Denton	74,306	Greater Manchester	North West
Gosport	73,763	Hampshire	South East
Grantham and Bourne	72,071	Lincolnshire	East Midlands
Gravesham	72,866	Kent	South East
Great Grimsby and Cleethorpes	77,050	Lincolnshire	Yorkshire and the Humber
Great Yarmouth	70,077	Norfolk	Eastern
Greenwich and Woolwich	69,824	London (Greenwich)	London
Guildford	71,367	Surrey	South East
Hackney North and Stoke Newington	75,401	London (Hackney)	London
Hackney South and Shoreditch	75,197	London (Hackney)	London
Halesowen	69,907	West Midlands	West Midlands
Halifax	74,563	West Yorkshire	Yorkshire and the Humber
Hamble Valley	76,902	Hampshire	South East
Hammersmith and Chiswick	74,746	London (Hammersmith and Fulham; Hounslow)	London
Hampstead and Highgate	74,222	London (Camden; Haringey)	London
Harborough, Oadby and Wigston	74,810	Leicestershire	East Midlands
Harlow	73,479	Essex	Eastern
Harpenden and Berkhamsted	71,635	Hertfordshire	Eastern
Harrogate and Knaresborough	75,800	North Yorkshire	Yorkshire and the Humber
Harrow East	76,299	London (Brent; Harrow)	London
Harrow West	74,060	London (Harrow)	London
Hartlepool	71,228	County Durham	North East
Harwich and North Essex	74,838	Essex	Eastern
Hastings and Rye	75,581	East Sussex	South East
Havant	72,766	Hampshire	South East
Hayes and Harlington	72,897	London (Hillingdon)	London
Hazel Grove	72,941	Greater Manchester	North West
Hemel Hempstead	70,496	Hertfordshire	Eastern
Hendon	71,496	London (Barnet)	London
Henley and Thame	70,626	Oxfordshire	South East
Hereford and South Herefordshire	71,125	Herefordshire	West Midlands
Herne Bay and Sandwich	76,028	Kent	South East
Hertford and Stortford	75,396	Hertfordshire	Eastern
Hertsmere	73,256	Hertfordshire	Eastern
Hexham	72,738	Northumberland; Tyne and Wear	North East
Heywood and Middleton North	73,306	Greater Manchester	North West
High Peak	73,960	Derbyshire	East Midlands
Hinckley and Bosworth	75,683	Leicestershire	East Midlands
Hitchin	72,112	Bedfordshire; Hertfordshire	Eastern
Holborn and St Pancras	75,475	London (Camden)	London
Honiton and Sidmouth	74,365	Devon	South West
Hornchurch and Upminster	76,938	London (Havering)	London
Hornsey and Friern Barnet	70,565	London (Barnet; Haringey)	London
Horsham	76,981	West Sussex	South East
Houghton and Sunderland South	76,883	Tyne and Wear	North East
Hove and Portslade	73,726	East Sussex	South East
Huddersfield	76,044	West Yorkshire	Yorkshire and the Humber
Huntingdon	75,590	Cambridgeshire	Eastern
Hyndburn	71,145	Lancashire	North West
Ilford North	74,684	London (Redbridge)	London
Ilford South	74,065	London (Barking and Dagenham; Redbridge)	London
Ipswich	75,117	Suffolk	Eastern
Isle of Wight East	56,805	Isle of Wight	South East
Isle of Wight West	54,911	Isle of Wight	South East
Islington North	73,970	London (Islington)	London
Islington South and Finsbury	75,905	London (Hackney; Islington)	London
Jarrow and Gateshead East	71,106	Tyne and Wear	North East
Keighley and Ilkley	72,954	West Yorkshire	Yorkshire and the Humber
Kenilworth and Southam	71,451	Warwickshire	West Midlands
Kensington and Bayswater	75,980	London (Kensington and Chelsea; Westminster)	London
Kettering	76,163	Northamptonshire	East Midlands
Kingston and Surbiton	75,410	London (Kingston upon Thames)	London
Kingston upon Hull East	72,622	East Riding of Yorkshire	Yorkshire and the Humber
Kingston upon Hull North and Cottingham	76,039	East Riding of Yorkshire	Yorkshire and the Humber
Kingston upon Hull West and Haltemprice	74,321	East Riding of Yorkshire	Yorkshire and the Humber
Kingswinford and South Staffordshire	71,896	Staffordshire; West Midlands	West Midlands
Knowsley	71,228	Merseyside	North West
Lancaster and Wyre	74,992	Lancashire	North West
Leeds Central and Headingley	75,396	West Yorkshire	Yorkshire and the Humber
Leeds East	75,330	West Yorkshire	Yorkshire and the Humber
Leeds North East	70,976	West Yorkshire	Yorkshire and the Humber
Leeds North West	71,607	West Yorkshire	Yorkshire and the Humber
Leeds South	74,726	West Yorkshire	Yorkshire and the Humber
Leeds South West and Morley	71,376	West Yorkshire	Yorkshire and the Humber
Leeds West and Pudsey	70,270	West Yorkshire	Yorkshire and the Humber
Leicester East	76,465	Leicestershire	East Midlands
Leicester South	71,007	Leicestershire	East Midlands
Leicester West	72,848	Leicestershire	East Midlands
Leigh and Atherton	76,363	Greater Manchester	North West
Lewes	75,091	East Sussex	South East
Lewisham East	71,706	London (Lewisham)	London
Lewisham North	73,504	London (Lewisham)	London
Lewisham West and East Dulwich	69,904	London (Lewisham; Southwark)	London
Leyton and Wanstead	71,330	London (Redbridge; Waltham Forest)	London
Lichfield	74,942	Staffordshire	West Midlands
Lincoln	74,128	Lincolnshire	East Midlands
Liverpool Garston	70,372	Merseyside	North West
Liverpool Riverside	70,157	Merseyside	North West
Liverpool Walton	71,181	Merseyside	North West
Liverpool Wavertree	71,076	Merseyside	North West
Liverpool West Derby	70,730	Merseyside	North West
Loughborough	73,902	Leicestershire	East Midlands
Louth and Horncastle	75,959	Lincolnshire	East Midlands
Lowestoft	73,967	Suffolk	Eastern
Luton North	73,266	Bedfordshire	Eastern
Luton South and South Bedfordshire	70,197	Bedfordshire	Eastern
Macclesfield	75,881	Cheshire	North West
Maidenhead	73,463	Berkshire	South East
Maidstone and Malling	73,084	Kent	South East
Makerfield	76,517	Greater Manchester	North West
Maldon	76,794	Essex	Eastern
Manchester Central	75,311	Greater Manchester	North West
Manchester Rusholme	70,692	Greater Manchester	North West
Manchester Withington	71,614	Greater Manchester	North West
Mansfield	74,680	Nottinghamshire	East Midlands
Melksham and Devizes	71,823	Wiltshire	South West
Melton and Syston	71,615	Leicestershire	East Midlands
Meriden and Solihull East	74,211	West Midlands	West Midlands
Mid Bedfordshire	71,748	Bedfordshire	Eastern
Mid Buckinghamshire	72,240	Buckinghamshire	South East
Mid Cheshire	69,775	Cheshire	North West
Mid Derbyshire	70,085	Derbyshire	East Midlands
Mid Dorset and North Poole	74,305	Dorset	South West
Mid Leicestershire	76,173	Leicestershire	East Midlands
Mid Norfolk	71,060	Norfolk	Eastern
Mid Sussex	72,255	West Sussex	South East
Middlesbrough and Thornaby East	71,742	North Yorkshire	North East
Middlesbrough South and East Cleveland	69,967	North Yorkshire	North East
Milton Keynes Central	76,708	Buckinghamshire	South East
Milton Keynes North	70,620	Buckinghamshire	South East
Mitcham and Morden	76,877	London (Merton)	London
Morecambe and Lunesdale	76,040	Cumbria; Lancashire	North West
New Forest East	73,823	Hampshire	South East
New Forest West	71,009	Hampshire	South East
Newark	76,478	Nottinghamshire	East Midlands
Newbury	71,631	Berkshire	South East
Newcastle-under-Lyme	70,025	Staffordshire	West Midlands
Newcastle upon Tyne Central and West	76,460	Tyne and Wear	North East
Newcastle upon Tyne East and Wallsend	76,875	Tyne and Wear	North East
Newcastle upon Tyne North	76,503	Tyne and Wear	North East
Newton Abbot	72,956	Devon	South West
Newton Aycliffe and Spennymoor	71,299	County Durham	North East
Normanton and Hemsworth	75,388	West Yorkshire	Yorkshire and the Humber
North Bedfordshire	76,319	Bedfordshire	Eastern
North Cornwall	75,034	Cornwall	South West
North Cotswolds	70,915	Gloucestershire	South West
North Devon	76,455	Devon	South West
North Dorset	72,109	Dorset	South West
North Durham	73,079	County Durham	North East
North East Cambridgeshire	70,806	Cambridgeshire	Eastern
North East Derbyshire	72,344	Derbyshire	East Midlands
North East Hampshire	73,306	Hampshire	South East
North East Hertfordshire	76,849	Hertfordshire	Eastern
North East Somerset and Hanham	73,113	Somerset; Gloucestershire	South West
North Herefordshire	70,894	Herefordshire	West Midlands
North Norfolk	70,719	Norfolk	Eastern
North Northumberland	72,541	Northumberland	North East
North Shropshire	77,052	Shropshire	West Midlands
North Somerset	73,963	Somerset	South West
North Warwickshire and Bedworth	70,245	Warwickshire	West Midlands
North West Cambridgeshire	73,556	Cambridgeshire	Eastern
North West Essex	76,280	Essex	Eastern
North West Hampshire	76,004	Hampshire	South East
North West Leicestershire	75,373	Leicestershire	East Midlands
North West Norfolk	75,200	Norfolk	Eastern
Northampton North	75,713	Northamptonshire	East Midlands
Northampton South	71,512	Northamptonshire	East Midlands
Norwich North	71,441	Norfolk	Eastern
Norwich South	73,301	Norfolk	Eastern
Nottingham East	75,327	Nottinghamshire	East Midlands
Nottingham North and Kimberley	74,515	Nottinghamshire	East Midlands
Nottingham South	76,076	Nottinghamshire	East Midlands
Nuneaton	70,335	Warwickshire	West Midlands
Old Bexley and Sidcup	74,317	London (Bexley)	London
Oldham East and Saddleworth	72,997	Greater Manchester	North West
Oldham West, Chadderton and Royton	74,183	Greater Manchester	North West
Orpington	71,571	London (Bromley)	London
Ossett and Denby Dale	71,595	West Yorkshire	Yorkshire and the Humber
Oxford East	72,371	Oxfordshire	South East
Oxford West and Abingdon	72,004	Oxfordshire	South East
Peckham	71,176	London (Southwark)	London
Pendle and Clitheroe	76,941	Lancashire	North West
Penistone and Stocksbridge	71,377	South Yorkshire	Yorkshire and the Humber
Penrith and Solway	76,720	Cumbria	North West
Peterborough	72,273	Cambridgeshire	Eastern
Plymouth Moor View	73,378	Devon	South West
Plymouth Sutton and Devonport	73,495	Devon	South West
Pontefract, Castleford and Knottingley	72,751	West Yorkshire	Yorkshire and the Humber
Poole	72,162	Dorset	South West
Poplar and Limehouse	75,814	London (Tower Hamlets)	London
Portsmouth North	71,844	Hampshire	South East
Portsmouth South	74,253	Hampshire	South East
Preston	72,946	Lancashire	North West
Putney	73,041	London (Wandsworth)	London
Queen's Park and Maida Vale	75,256	London (Brent; Westminster)	London
Rawmarsh and Conisbrough	70,272	South Yorkshire	Yorkshire and the Humber
Rayleigh and Wickford	76,422	Essex	Eastern
Reading Central	71,283	Berkshire	South East
Reading West and Mid Berkshire	69,999	Berkshire	South East
Redcar	71,331	North Yorkshire	North East
Redditch	69,921	Worcestershire	West Midlands
Reigate	76,139	Surrey	South East
Ribble Valley	75,993	Lancashire	North West
Richmond and Northallerton	72,744	North Yorkshire	Yorkshire and the Humber
Richmond Park	75,037	London (Kingston upon Thames; Richmond upon Thames)	London
Rochdale	71,697	Greater Manchester	North West
Rochester and Strood	72,155	Kent	South East
Romford	73,730	London (Havering)	London
Romsey and Southampton North	73,831	Hampshire	South East
Rossendale and Darwen	74,593	Lancashire	North West
Rother Valley	70,184	South Yorkshire	Yorkshire and the Humber
Rotherham	75,345	South Yorkshire	Yorkshire and the Humber
Rugby	72,603	Warwickshire	West Midlands
Ruislip, Northwood and Pinner	72,168	London (Harrow; Hillingdon)	London
Runcorn and Helsby	70,950	Cheshire	North West
Runnymede and Weybridge	73,778	Surrey	South East
Rushcliffe	76,171	Nottinghamshire	East Midlands
Rutland and Stamford	70,864	Leicestershire and Rutland; Lincolnshire	East Midlands
Salford	72,169	Greater Manchester	North West
Salisbury	70,242	Wiltshire	South West
Scarborough and Whitby	73,862	North Yorkshire	Yorkshire and the Humber
Scunthorpe	74,278	Lincolnshire	Yorkshire and the Humber
Sefton Central	74,746	Merseyside	North West
Selby	74,761	North Yorkshire; West Yorkshire	Yorkshire and the Humber
Sevenoaks	73,684	Kent	South East
Sheffield Brightside and Hillsborough	71,154	South Yorkshire	Yorkshire and the Humber
Sheffield Central	70,453	South Yorkshire	Yorkshire and the Humber
Sheffield Hallam	76,637	South Yorkshire	Yorkshire and the Humber
Sheffield Heeley	74,614	South Yorkshire	Yorkshire and the Humber
Sheffield South East	76,223	South Yorkshire	Yorkshire and the Humber
Sherwood Forest	76,543	Nottinghamshire	East Midlands
Shipley	74,095	West Yorkshire	Yorkshire and the Humber
Shrewsbury	75,139	Shropshire	West Midlands
Sittingbourne and Sheppey	76,818	Kent	South East
Skipton and Ripon	76,758	North Yorkshire	Yorkshire and the Humber
Sleaford and North Hykeham	73,380	Lincolnshire	East Midlands
Slough	75,287	Berkshire	South East
Smethwick	71,195	West Midlands	West Midlands
Solihull West and Shirley	70,537	West Midlands	West Midlands
South Basildon and East Thurrock	73,322	Essex	Eastern
South Cambridgeshire	75,484	Cambridgeshire	Eastern
South Cotswolds	72,865	Gloucestershire; Wiltshire	South West
South Derbyshire	71,202	Derbyshire	East Midlands
South Devon	71,691	Devon	South West
South Dorset	76,640	Dorset	South West
South East Cornwall	71,734	Cornwall	South West
South Holland and The Deepings	76,139	Lincolnshire	East Midlands
South Leicestershire	75,634	Leicestershire	East Midlands
South Norfolk	69,837	Norfolk	Eastern
South Northamptonshire	76,555	Northamptonshire	East Midlands
South Ribble	72,029	Lancashire	North West
South Shields	69,725	Tyne and Wear	North East
South Shropshire	77,034	Shropshire	West Midlands
South Suffolk	71,070	Suffolk	Eastern
South West Devon	75,371	Devon	South West
South West Hertfordshire	71,552	Hertfordshire	Eastern
South West Norfolk	72,496	Norfolk	Eastern
South West Wiltshire	71,551	Wiltshire	South West
Southampton Itchen	72,150	Hampshire	South East
Southampton Test	69,960	Hampshire	South East
Southend East and Rochford	70,094	Essex	Eastern
Southend West and Leigh	76,824	Essex	Eastern
Southgate and Wood Green	76,034	London (Enfield; Haringey)	London
Southport	74,168	Lancashire; Merseyside	North West
Spelthorne	72,897	Surrey	South East
Spen Valley	72,169	West Yorkshire	Yorkshire and the Humber
St Albans	70,881	Hertfordshire	Eastern
St Austell and Newquay	74,585	Cornwall	South West
St Helens North	76,082	Merseyside	North West
St Helens South and Whiston	70,937	Merseyside	North West
St Ives	70,107	Cornwall	South West
St Neots and Mid Cambridgeshire	74,699	Cambridgeshire	Eastern
Stafford	70,537	Staffordshire	West Midlands
Staffordshire Moorlands	70,113	Staffordshire	West Midlands
Stalybridge and Hyde	73,028	Greater Manchester	North West
Stevenage	70,370	Hertfordshire	Eastern
Stockport	74,769	Greater Manchester	North West
Stockton North	69,779	County Durham	North East
Stockton West	70,108	North Yorkshire; County Durham	North East
Stoke-on-Trent Central	70,550	Staffordshire	West Midlands
Stoke-on-Trent North	69,821	Staffordshire	West Midlands
Stoke-on-Trent South	69,831	Staffordshire	West Midlands
Stone, Great Wyrley and Penkridge	70,701	Staffordshire	West Midlands
Stourbridge	69,840	West Midlands	West Midlands
Stratford-on-Avon	72,388	Warwickshire	West Midlands
Stratford and Bow	73,849	London (Newham; Tower Hamlets)	London
Streatham and Croydon North	76,050	London (Croydon; Lambeth)	London
Stretford and Urmston	73,212	Greater Manchester	North West
Stroud	76,249	Gloucestershire	South West
Suffolk Coastal	72,663	Suffolk	Eastern
Sunderland Central	72,688	Tyne and Wear	North East
Surrey Heath	70,825	Surrey	South East
Sussex Weald	70,075	East Sussex	South East
Sutton and Cheam	71,284	London (Sutton)	London
Sutton Coldfield	74,584	West Midlands	West Midlands
Swindon North	72,163	Wiltshire	South West
Swindon South	72,468	Wiltshire	South West
Tamworth	73,644	Staffordshire	West Midlands
Tatton	75,538	Cheshire	North West
Taunton and Wellington	76,049	Somerset	South West
Telford	70,768	Shropshire	West Midlands
Tewkesbury	72,426	Gloucestershire	South West
The Wrekin	76,143	Shropshire	West Midlands
Thirsk and Malton	76,623	North Yorkshire	Yorkshire and the Humber
Thornbury and Yate	74,935	Gloucestershire	South West
Thurrock	73,347	Essex	Eastern
Tipton and Wednesbury	73,820	West Midlands	West Midlands
Tiverton and Minehead	70,829	Devon; Somerset	South West
Tonbridge	73,692	Kent	South East
Tooting	76,986	London (Wandsworth)	London
Torbay	75,742	Devon	South West
Torridge and Tavistock	74,802	Devon	South West
Tottenham	75,968	London (Hackney; Haringey)	London
Truro and Falmouth	73,326	Cornwall	South West
Tunbridge Wells	75,213	Kent	South East
Twickenham	75,889	London (Richmond upon Thames)	London
Tynemouth	73,022	Tyne and Wear	North East
Uxbridge and South Ruislip	75,042	London (Hillingdon)	London
Vauxhall and Camberwell Green	69,995	London (Lambeth; Southwark)	London
Wakefield and Rothwell	73,968	West Yorkshire	Yorkshire and the Humber
Wallasey	73,054	Merseyside	North West
Walsall and Bloxwich	74,866	West Midlands	West Midlands
Walthamstow	70,867	London (Waltham Forest)	London
Warrington North	72,350	Cheshire	North West
Warrington South	76,639	Cheshire	North West
Warwick and Leamington	75,440	Warwickshire	West Midlands
Washington and Gateshead South	71,775	Tyne and Wear	North East
Watford	70,576	Hertfordshire	Eastern
Waveney Valley	70,540	Norfolk; Suffolk	Eastern
Weald of Kent	70,110	Kent	South East
Wellingborough and Rushden	76,669	Northamptonshire	East Midlands
Wells and Mendip Hills	69,843	Somerset; Somerset	South West
Welwyn Hatfield	74,535	Hertfordshire	Eastern
West Bromwich	72,206	West Midlands	West Midlands
West Dorset	75,390	Dorset	South West
West Ham and Beckton	70,590	London (Newham)	London
West Lancashire	73,652	Lancashire	North West
West Suffolk	76,243	Suffolk	Eastern
West Worcestershire	76,638	Worcestershire	West Midlands
Westmorland and Lonsdale	72,322	Cumbria	North West
Weston-super-Mare	70,722	Somerset	South West
Wetherby and Easingwold	71,455	North Yorkshire; West Yorkshire	Yorkshire and the Humber
Whitehaven and Workington	73,385	Cumbria	North West
Widnes and Halewood	70,865	Cheshire; Merseyside	North West
Wigan	75,607	Greater Manchester	North West
Wimbledon	74,641	London (Kingston upon Thames; Merton)	London
Winchester	76,577	Hampshire	South East
Windsor	74,338	Berkshire; Surrey	South East
Wirral West	72,126	Merseyside	North West
Witham	75,064	Essex	Eastern
Witney	70,042	Oxfordshire	South East
Woking	71,737	Surrey	South East
Wokingham	70,235	Berkshire	South East
Wolverhampton North East	70,449	West Midlands	West Midlands
Wolverhampton South East	75,685	West Midlands	West Midlands
Wolverhampton West	75,592	West Midlands	West Midlands
Worcester	73,928	Worcestershire	West Midlands
Worsley and Eccles	76,915	Greater Manchester	North West
Worthing West	76,293	West Sussex	South East
Wycombe	71,769	Buckinghamshire	South East
Wyre Forest	77,015	Worcestershire	West Midlands
Wythenshawe and Sale East	76,971	Greater Manchester	North West
Yeovil	76,056	Somerset	South West
York Central	74,854	North Yorkshire	Yorkshire and the Humber
York Outer	72,720	North Yorkshire	Yorkshire and the Humber

=== Scotland ===
Constituencies in Scotland from June 2024
Constituency	Electorate March 2020	Council area
Aberdeen North	76,895	Aberdeen City
Aberdeen South	76,560	Aberdeen City
Aberdeenshire North and Moray East	71,485	Aberdeenshire; Moray
Airdrie and Shotts	70,420	North Lanarkshire
Alloa and Grangemouth	72,265	Clackmannanshire; Falkirk
Angus and Perthshire Glens	77,006	Angus; Perth and Kinross
Arbroath and Broughty Ferry	76,810	Angus; Dundee City
Argyll, Bute and South Lochaber	71,707	Argyll and Bute; Highland
Ayr, Carrick and Cumnock	72,057	East Ayrshire; South Ayrshire
Bathgate and Linlithgow	71,650	Falkirk; West Lothian
Berwickshire, Roxburgh and Selkirk	74,687	Scottish Borders
Caithness, Sutherland and Easter Ross	75,173	Highland
Central Ayrshire	69,779	North Ayrshire; South Ayrshire
Coatbridge and Bellshill	72,507	North Lanarkshire
Cowdenbeath and Kirkcaldy	70,329	Fife
Cumbernauld and Kirkintilloch	70,579	East Dunbartonshire; North Lanarkshire
Dumfries and Galloway	76,863	Dumfries and Galloway
Dumfriesshire, Clydesdale and Tweeddale	70,738	Dumfries and Galloway; Scottish Borders; South Lanarkshire
Dundee Central	75,298	Dundee City
Dunfermline and Dollar	70,725	Clackmannanshire; Fife
East Kilbride and Strathaven	75,161	South Lanarkshire
East Renfrewshire	72,959	East Renfrewshire
Edinburgh East and Musselburgh	75,705	City of Edinburgh; East Lothian
Edinburgh North and Leith	76,770	City of Edinburgh
Edinburgh South	70,980	City of Edinburgh
Edinburgh South West	73,315	City of Edinburgh
Edinburgh West	76,723	City of Edinburgh
Falkirk	75,067	Falkirk
Glasgow East	69,748	Glasgow City
Glasgow North	73,210	Glasgow City
Glasgow North East	75,236	Glasgow City
Glasgow South	71,344	Glasgow City
Glasgow South West	70,431	Glasgow City
Glasgow West	72,499	Glasgow City
Glenrothes and Mid Fife	69,734	Fife
Gordon and Buchan	70,238	Aberdeenshire
Hamilton and Clyde Valley	74,577	South Lanarkshire
Inverclyde and Renfrewshire West	70,418	Inverclyde; Renfrewshire
Inverness, Skye and West Ross-shire	76,903	Highland
Kilmarnock and Loudoun	74,801	East Ayrshire
Livingston	75,454	West Lothian
Lothian East	71,287	East Lothian
Mid Dunbartonshire	75,099	East Dunbartonshire; North Lanarkshire
Midlothian	71,210	Midlothian
Moray West, Nairn and Strathspey	76,237	Highland; Moray
Motherwell, Wishaw and Carluke	72,318	North Lanarkshire; South Lanarkshire
Na h-Eileanan an Iar	21,177	Na h-Eileanan an Iar
North Ayrshire and Arran	73,588	North Ayrshire
North East Fife	70,452	Fife
Orkney and Shetland	34,824	Orkney Islands; Shetland Islands
Paisley and Renfrewshire North	69,941	Glasgow City; Renfrewshire
Paisley and Renfrewshire South	69,813	Renfrewshire
Perth and Kinross-shire	76,320	Perth and Kinross
Rutherglen	71,612	South Lanarkshire
Stirling and Strathallan	77,008	Perth and Kinross; Stirling
West Aberdeenshire and Kincardine	73,634	Aberdeenshire
West Dunbartonshire	70,286	Glasgow City; West Dunbartonshire

=== Wales ===
Constituencies in Wales from June 2024
Constituency	Electorate March 2020	Council area
Aberafan Maesteg	69,817	Bridgend; Neath Port Talbot
Alyn and Deeside	75,695	Flintshire
Bangor Aberconwy	70,468	Conwy; Denbighshire; Gwynedd
Blaenau Gwent and Rhymney	71,079	Blaenau Gwent; Caerphilly
Brecon, Radnor and Cwm Tawe	72,113	Neath Port Talbot; Powys
Bridgend	70,770	Bridgend
Caerfyrddin	72,683	Carmarthenshire
Caerphilly	72,458	Caerphilly
Cardiff East	72,463	Cardiff
Cardiff North	71,143	Cardiff; Rhondda Cynon Taf
Cardiff South and Penarth	72,269	Cardiff; Vale of Glamorgan
Cardiff West	73,947	Cardiff; Rhondda Cynon Taf
Ceredigion Preseli	74,063	Ceredigion; Pembrokeshire
Clwyd East	76,395	Denbighshire; Flintshire; Wrexham
Clwyd North	76,150	Conwy; Denbighshire
Dwyfor Meirionnydd	72,533	Denbighshire; Gwynedd
Gower	76,801	Swansea
Llanelli	69,895	Carmarthenshire
Merthyr Tydfil and Aberdare	74,805	Merthyr Tydfil; Rhondda Cynon Taf
Mid and South Pembrokeshire	76,820	Pembrokeshire
Monmouthshire	72,681	Monmouthshire
Montgomeryshire and Glyndŵr	74,223	Powys; Wrexham
Neath and Swansea East	74,705	Neath Port Talbot; Swansea
Newport East	76,159	Newport
Newport West and Islwyn	76,234	Caerphilly; Newport
Pontypridd	73,743	Rhondda Cynon Taf
Rhondda and Ogmore	73,557	Bridgend; Rhondda Cynon Taf
Swansea West	74,612	Swansea
Torfaen	70,591	Torfaen
Vale of Glamorgan	70,426	Vale of Glamorgan
Wrexham	70,964	Wrexham
Ynys Môn	52,415	Isle of Anglesey

=== Northern Ireland ===
Constituencies in Northern Ireland from June 2024
Constituency	Electorate March 2020	Council area
Belfast East	70,076	Belfast; Lisburn and Castlereagh
Belfast North	71,372	Antrim and Newtownabbey; Belfast
Belfast South and Mid Down	71,978	Belfast; Lisburn and Castlereagh; Newry, Mourne and Down
Belfast West	71,921	Belfast; Lisburn and Castlereagh
East Antrim	69,936	Antrim and Newtownabbey; Causeway Coast and Glens; Mid and East Antrim
East Londonderry	72,213	Causeway Coast and Glens; Derry City and Strabane
Fermanagh and South Tyrone	74,643	Armagh City, Banbridge and Craigavon; Fermanagh and Omagh; Mid Ulster
Foyle	69,890	Derry City and Strabane
Lagan Valley	76,332	Armagh City, Banbridge and Craigavon; Lisburn and Castlereagh
Mid Ulster	70,094	Armagh City, Banbridge and Craigavon; Mid Ulster
Newry and Armagh	74,585	Armagh City, Banbridge and Craigavon; Newry, Mourne and Down
North Antrim	71,165	Causeway Coast and Glens; Mid and East Antrim
North Down	70,412	Ards and North Down; Belfast
South Antrim	71,646	Antrim and Newtownabbey; Lisburn and Castlereagh
South Down	71,772	Armagh City, Banbridge and Craigavon; Newry, Mourne and Down
Strangford	70,070	Ards and North Down; Newry, Mourne and Down
Upper Bann	76,969	Armagh City, Banbridge and Craigavon
West Tyrone	70,614	Derry City and Strabane; Fermanagh and Omagh; Mid Ulster

== Recent boundary reviews ==
Following the abandonment of the Sixth Periodic Review (the 2018 review), the Boundary Commissions formally launched the 2023 Review on 5 January 2021 and published their final proposals on 28 June 2023.

See 2023 review of Westminster constituencies and List of United Kingdom Parliament constituencies (2024–present) by region for further details.

=== Summary of main boundary changes for the 2024 election ===
- England – gained 10 seats
- Scotland – lost 2 seats
- Northern Ireland – no change
- Wales – lost 8 seats

== See also ==
- List of former United Kingdom Parliament constituencies
- Member of Parliament
- Number of Westminster MPs
- Lists of electoral districts by country and territory
- United Kingdom general elections overview

== Bibliography ==
- Boundary Commission for N.I. Fifth Periodical Report (HM Command Paper 73) – Parliamentary Constituencies of Northern Ireland. Retrieved 2013-07-19.
