= Parliamentary constituencies in Buckinghamshire =

The county of Buckinghamshire in relation to England.

The ceremonial county of Buckinghamshire, which includes the unitary authorities of Buckinghamshire and the City of Milton Keynes, is divided into 8 parliamentary constituencies – 1 borough constituency and 7 county constituencies. At the 2024 general election, the county returned 5 Labour MPs, 2 Conservatives and 1 Liberal Democrat.

== Constituencies ==
Conservative † Labour ‡ Liberal Democrat ¤

Constituency (Note: BC denotes borough constituency, CC denotes county constituency.)	Electorate	Majority (Note: The majority is the number of votes the winning candidate receives more than their nearest rival.)	Member of Parliament	Nearest opposition	Map
Aylesbury CC	75,636	630	Laura Kyrke-Smith ‡	Rob Butler †	A medium constituency stretching from the centre to the southwest of the county.
Beaconsfield CC	72,315	5,455	Joy Morrissey †	Anna Crabtree ¤	A medium constituency, located in the far south of the county.
Buckingham and Bletchley CC	73,644	2,421	Callum Anderson ‡	Iain Stewart †	A large constituency, stretching from the centre to the north-east of the county.
Chesham and Amersham CC	74,155	5,451	Sarah Green ¤	Gareth Williams †	A medium constituency in the southeast of the county.
Mid Buckinghamshire CC	72,240	6,872	Greg Smith †	Anja Schaefer ¤	A large constituency, stretching from the centre of the county into the east and north-east.
Milton Keynes Central BC	76,708	7,291	Emily Darlington ‡	Johnny Luk †	A small constituency in the north-west of the county.
Milton Keynes North CC	70,620	5,430	Chris Curtis ‡	Ben Everitt †	A small-to-medium-sized constituency, situated in the very north of the county.
Wycombe CC	71,769	4,591	Emma Reynolds ‡	Steve Baker †	A medium-sized constituency in the south-west of the county.

== Boundary changes ==
=== 2024 ===
For the 2023 Periodic Review of Westminster constituencies, which redrew the constituency map ahead of the 2024 United Kingdom general election, the Boundary Commission for England proposed that the number of seats in the combined area of Buckinghamshire and Milton Keynes be increased from seven to eight with the creation of a new cross-authority constituency named Buckingham and Bletchley. This led to significant changes elsewhere, with Milton Keynes Central replacing Milton Keynes South and Mid Buckinghamshire replacing the existing Buckingham seat. These changes came into effect for the 2024 general election.

Former name
1. Aylesbury CC
2. Beaconsfield CC
3. Buckingham CC
4. Chesham and Amersham CC
5. Milton Keynes North CC
6. Milton Keynes South BC
7. Wycombe CC
Boundaries 2010–2024

Parliamentary constituencies in Buckinghamshire (2010-2024)

Current name
1. Aylesbury CC
2. Beaconsfield CC
3. Buckingham and Bletchley CC
4. Chesham and Amersham CC
5. Mid Buckinghamshire CC
6. Milton Keynes Central BC
7. Milton Keynes North CC
8. Wycombe CC
Boundaries 2024–present

Proposed Revised constituencies in Buckinghamshire (2024-present)

=== 2010 ===
Under the Fifth Periodic Review of Westminster constituencies, the Boundary Commission for England decided to retain Buckinghamshire's constituencies for the 2010 election, making minor changes to realign constituency boundaries with the boundaries of current local government wards, and to reduce the electoral disparity between constituencies. The changes included the return of Great Missenden to Chesham and Amersham, Hazlemere to Wycombe and Aston Clinton to Buckingham. In addition, Marlow was transferred from Wycombe to Beaconsfield and Princes Risborough from Aylesbury to Buckingham. The boundary between the two Milton Keynes constituencies was realigned and they were renamed as Milton Keynes North and Milton Keynes South.

Former name
1. Aylesbury CC
2. Beaconsfield CC
3. Buckingham CC
4. Chesham and Amersham CC
5. Milton Keynes South West BC
6. Milton Keynes North East CC
7. Wycombe CC
Boundaries 1997-2010

Parliamentary constituencies in Buckinghamshire (1997-2010)

Current name
1. Aylesbury CC
2. Beaconsfield CC
3. Buckingham CC
4. Chesham and Amersham CC
5. Milton Keynes North CC
6. Milton Keynes South BC
7. Wycombe CC
Boundaries 2010–2024

Proposed Revised constituencies in Buckinghamshire (2010-2024)

== Results history ==
Primary data source: House of Commons research briefing - General election results from 1918 to 2019

=== 2024 ===
The number of votes cast for each political party who fielded candidates in constituencies comprising Buckinghamshire in the 2024 general election were as follows:

Party	Votes	%	Change from 2019	Seats	Change from 2019
Conservative	126,497	32.2%	▼20.5%	2	▼5
Labour	108,134	27.5%	▲2.1%	5	▲5
Liberal Democrats	79,011	20.1%	▲6.4%	1	▲1
Reform UK	49,683	12.6%	▲12.3%	0	0
Greens	20,433	5.2%	▲2.3%	0	0
Others	4,972	1.3%	▼3.7%	0	0
Workers Party	4,326	1.1%	New	0	New
Total	393,056	100.0		8	

=== 2019 ===
The number of votes cast for each political party who fielded candidates in constituencies comprising Buckinghamshire in the 2019 general election were as follows:

Party	Votes	%	Change from 2017	Seats	Change from 2017
Conservative	220,814	52.7%	▲5.7%	7	▲1
Labour	106,226	25.4%	▼3.9%	0	0
Liberal Democrats	57,554	13.7%	▲7.3%	0	0
Greens	12,349	2.9%	▼1.1%	0	0
Brexit	1,286	0.3%	new	0	0
Others	20,664	5.0%	▼8.3%	0	▼1
Total	418,893	100.0		7	

=== Percentage votes ===
Note that before 1983 Buckinghamshire included the Eton and Slough areas of what is now Berkshire.

Election year	1922	1923	1924	1929	1931	1935	1945	1950	1951	1955	1959	1964	1966	1970	1974 (F)	1974 (O)	1979	1983	1987	1992	1997	2001	2005	2010	2015	2017	2019	2024
Conservative	50.2	47.0	54.3	47.1	72.3	60.6	43.4	45.2	54.3	53.9	52.5	48.8	47.1	52.5	44.3	44.4	55.0	56.8	57.0	57.0	43.7	45.1	47.8	44.3	45.5	47.0	52.7	32.2
Labour	13.8	19.6	16.3	19.7	20.9	29.1	43.8	39.7	45.7	40.4	35.4	36.0	39.7	35.9	29.7	32.0	27.4	14.4	15.5	19.2	30.6	30.9	25.9	15.5	18.1	29.3	25.4	27.5
Liberal Democrat^{1}	36.1	33.4	29.4	33.1	6.8	10.3	12.7	14.7	-	5.7	12.1	15.2	13.2	11.7	25.4	22.5	15.9	28.5	27.0	22.1	21.2	19.9	21.2	20.9	6.5	6.4	13.7	20.1
Reform UK^{2}	-	-	-	-	-	-	-	-	-	-	-	-	-	-	-	-	-	-	-	-	-	-	-	-	-	-	0.3	12.6
Green Party	-	-	-	-	-	-	-	-	-	-	-	-	-	-	-	-	-	-	*	*	*	*	*	0.8	5.7	4.0	2.9	5.2
UKIP	-	-	-	-	-	-	-	-	-	-	-	-	-	-	-	-	-	-	-	-	*	*	*	6.2	14.9	3.2	*	-
The Speaker^{3}	-	-	-	-	-	-	-	-	-	-	-	-	-	-	-	-	-	-	-	-	-	-	-	6.3	9.0	8.5	-	-
Other	-	-	-	-	-	-	-	0.4	-	-	-	-	-	-	0.6	1.1	1.7	0.4	0.5	1.8	4.5	4.0	5.0	5.9	0.3	1.6	5.0	2.4^{4}

^{1}pre-1979: Liberal Party; 1983 & 1987 - SDP-Liberal Alliance

^{2}2019: Standing as the Brexit Party.

^{3}Standing in Buckingham, unopposed by the 3 main parties.

^{4}Including Workers Party of Britain.

* Included in Other

Accurate vote percentages for the 1918 election cannot be obtained because some candidates stood unopposed.

=== Seats ===
Election year	1983	1987	1992	1997	2001	2005	2010	2015	2017	2019	2024
Labour	0	0	0	2	2	1	0	0	0	0	5
Conservative	6	6	7	5	5	6	6	6	6	7	2
Liberal Democrats	0	0	0	2	2	1	0	0	0	0	1
The Speaker^{1}	-	-	-	-	-	-	1	1	1	-	-
Total	6	6	7	7	7	7	7	7	7	7	8

^{1}John Bercow

=== Maps ===
==== 1885-1910 ====
1885

1886

1892

1895

1900

1906

Jan 1910

Dec 1910

==== 1918-1945 ====
1918

1922

1923

1924

1929

1931

1935

1945

==== 1950-1979 ====
1950

1951

1955

1959

1964

1966

1970

Feb 1974

Oct 1974

1979

==== 1983-present ====
1983

1987

1992

1997

2001

2005

2010

2015

2017

2019

2024

== Historical representation by party ==
A cell marked → (with a different colour background to the preceding cell) indicates that the previous MP continued to sit under a new party name.

=== 1885 to 1945 ===
Conservative Liberal Liberal Unionist

Constituency	1885	1886	89	91	1892	1895	99	1900	1906	Jan 10	Dec 10	12	14	1918	1922	1923	1924	1929	1931	1935	37	38	43
Aylesbury	F. de Rothschild	→					W. de Rothschild			L. de Rothschild		→				Keens	Burgoyne	Beaumont				Reed	
Buckingham	E. Verney	Hubbard	E. Verney	Leon		Carlile			F. Verney	H. Verney				Bowyer							Whiteley		Berry
Wycombe	Curzon							Grenfell	Herbert	Cripps			du Pré			Woodhouse	Knox						

=== 1945 to 1983 ===
Conservative Labour

Constituency	1945	1950	1951	52	1955	1959	1964	1966	1970	Feb 1974	Oct 1974	78	1979	82
Eton and Slough	Levy	Brockway					Meyer	Lestor						
Aylesbury	Reed	Summers							Raison					
Buckingham	Crawley		Markham				Maxwell		Benyon					
Wycombe	Haire		Astor	Hall								Whitney		
Buckinghamshire South / Beaconsfield (1974)		Bell												Smith
Chesham and Amersham										Gilmour				

=== 1983 to present ===
Conservative Independent Labour Speaker Liberal Democrats

Constituency	1983	1987	1992	1997	2001	2005	09	2010	2015	2017	19	2019	21	2024
Aylesbury	Raison		Lidington									Butler		Kyrke-Smith
Buckingham / Mid Buckinghamshire (2024)	Walden			Bercow			→					G. Smith		
Wycombe	Whitney				Goodman			Baker						Reynolds
Beaconsfield	T. Smith			Grieve							→	Morrissey		
Chesham and Amersham	Gilmour		Gillan										Green	
Milton Keynes / NE MK ('92) / MK North ('10)	Benyon		Butler	White		Lancaster						Everitt		Curtis
Milton Keynes SW / MK S ('10) / MK Central ('24)			Legg	Starkey				Stewart						Darlington
Buckingham and Bletchley														Anderson

== See also ==
- List of parliamentary constituencies in the South East (region)
- History of parliamentary constituencies and boundaries in Buckinghamshire
