= Milton Keynes North =

UK Parliament constituency (since 2010)

Coordinates: 52.1°N 0.72°W

- County constituency for the House of Commons
- Boundaries since 2024
- Boundary of Milton Keynes North in South East England
- County: Buckinghamshire
- Population: 132,698
- Electorate: 70,620 (2023)
- Major settlements: Newport Pagnell; Olney; Stony Stratford; Wolverton

Current constituency
- Created: 2010
- Member of Parliament: Chris Curtis (Labour)
- Created from: North East Milton Keynes, Milton Keynes South West

Milton Keynes North is a constituency represented in the House of Commons of the UK Parliament since the 2024 general election by Chris Curtis for the Labour Party.

With effect from the 2024 general election, the City of Milton Keynes has three constituencies: this constituency, Milton Keynes Central, and Buckingham and Bletchley. The boundaries of this constituency were changed significantly since the 2019 election, in particularly losing Central Milton Keynes to Milton Keynes Central and gaining Stony Stratford from the abolished Milton Keynes South).

== Constituency profile ==
Milton Keynes North is a constituency in the City of Milton Keynes. It covers the northern areas of the Milton Keynes urban area, including the towns of Stony Stratford, Wolverton and Newport Pagnell and the neighbourhoods of Whitehouse, Fairfields, Great Linford, Stantonbury, Tongwell and part of Bradwell. It also covers the rural area to the north of the city, which includes Olney, Hanslope and other villages and hamlets.

The area that is today Milton Keynes was a rural area of small towns and villages until the late 1960s, when it was designated as a new town and designed to become a city. The city is known for its modernist architecture and grid road system between neighbourhoods. The towns in this constituency are older than the rest of the city and are generally affluent, although there is some deprivation in the neighbourhoods close to the city centre. House prices here are generally similar to the national average but lower than the rest of South East England.

In general, residents of Milton Keynes North have average levels of education and homeownership. Household income is high and the child poverty rate is low. A high proportion of residents work in retail and professional occupations, and the percentage of residents claiming unemployment benefits is in line with the country as a whole. White people made up 80% of the population at the 2021 census and Asians were the largest ethnic minority group at 9%.

At the local city council, Newport Pagnell and Bradwell are represented by Liberal Democrat councillors, Olney and the rural areas by Conservatives and the rest of the towns and neighbourhoods by the Labour Party. An estimated 52% of voters in Milton Keynes North supported leaving the European Union in the 2016 referendum, identical to the nationwide figure.

== Constituency history ==
This constituency (and its counterpart, Milton Keynes South), came into being when the two parliamentary constituencies covering the City of Milton Keynes unitary authority area (Note: At the time, the Borough of Milton Keynes.) (Milton Keynes North East and Milton Keynes South West) were reconfigured following the Boundary Commission's Fifth Periodic Review of Westminster constituencies with the aim of equalising the electorate as between the constituencies in the light of population growth that had occurred mainly in the Milton Keynes Urban Area. This constituency is the more rural of the two.

Mark Lancaster, who had been the incumbent for Milton Keynes North East, won the new constituency for the Conservatives in the 2010 general election and retained it at the 2015 and 2017 general elections. He stood down before the 2019 general election, citing abuse and two threats to his life. His successor to the Conservative candidacy was Ben Everitt, who won the seat with an increased majority. Everitt was defeated at the 2024 general election by Labour's Chris Curtis on a swing of 12.5%.

== Boundaries ==
=== 2010–2024 ===
Map of 2010–2024 boundaries

The constituency took up the majority of the City of Milton Keynes unitary authority area and was one of the borough's two constituencies. Milton Keynes North has a larger rural area; the other, Milton Keynes South, covered a smaller, more urban area.

At its creation the constituency comprised the electoral wards of Bradwell, Campbell Park, Hanslope Park, Linford North, Linford South, Middleton, Newport Pagnell North, Newport Pagnell South, Olney, Sherington, Stantonbury and Wolverton .

Following a revision to the ward boundaries in 2013, the seat comprised part or all of the following Council electoral wards:

- Bradwell (part)
- Broughton]] (part)
- Campbell Park and Old Woughton (part)
- Central Milton Keynes
- Monkston (part)
- Newport Pagnell North and Hanslope
- Newport Pagnell South
- Olney
- Stantonbury
- Wolverton
- Woughton and Fishermead (part)

The City Council ward boundaries do not necessarily coincide with the town and parish council areas.

Of these wards, Newport Pagnell North and Hanslope, and Olney are more rural. The remainder are more urban. Each ward returns three councillors so their electorates are broadly equal.

=== 2024–present ===
Following the 2023 review of Westminster constituencies which came into effect for the 2024 general election, the constituency is composed of the following (as they existed on 1 December 2020):

- The Milton Keynes City Council wards of: Bradwell; Newport Pagnell North and Hanslope; Newport Pagnell South; Olney; Stantonbury; Stony Stratford; Wolverton.

The constituency was subject to major changes, with 43% of its electorate, including Milton Keynes city centre and parishes to the east (Campbell Park (civil parish), Old Woughton, Kents Hill and Monkston and Broughton and Milton Keynes), forming part of the new constituency of Milton Keynes Central. To partly compensate, Stony Stratford was added to Milton Keynes North from the abolished Milton Keynes South seat".

A new constituency, Buckingham and Bletchley, (in effect) gives Milton Keynes its third parliamentary constituency, albeit one that straddles the border with Buckinghamshire Council.

== Members of Parliament ==
North East Milton Keynes prior to 2010

Election	Member	Party
2010	Mark Lancaster	Conservative
2019	Ben Everitt	Conservative
2024	Chris Curtis	Labour

== Elections ==
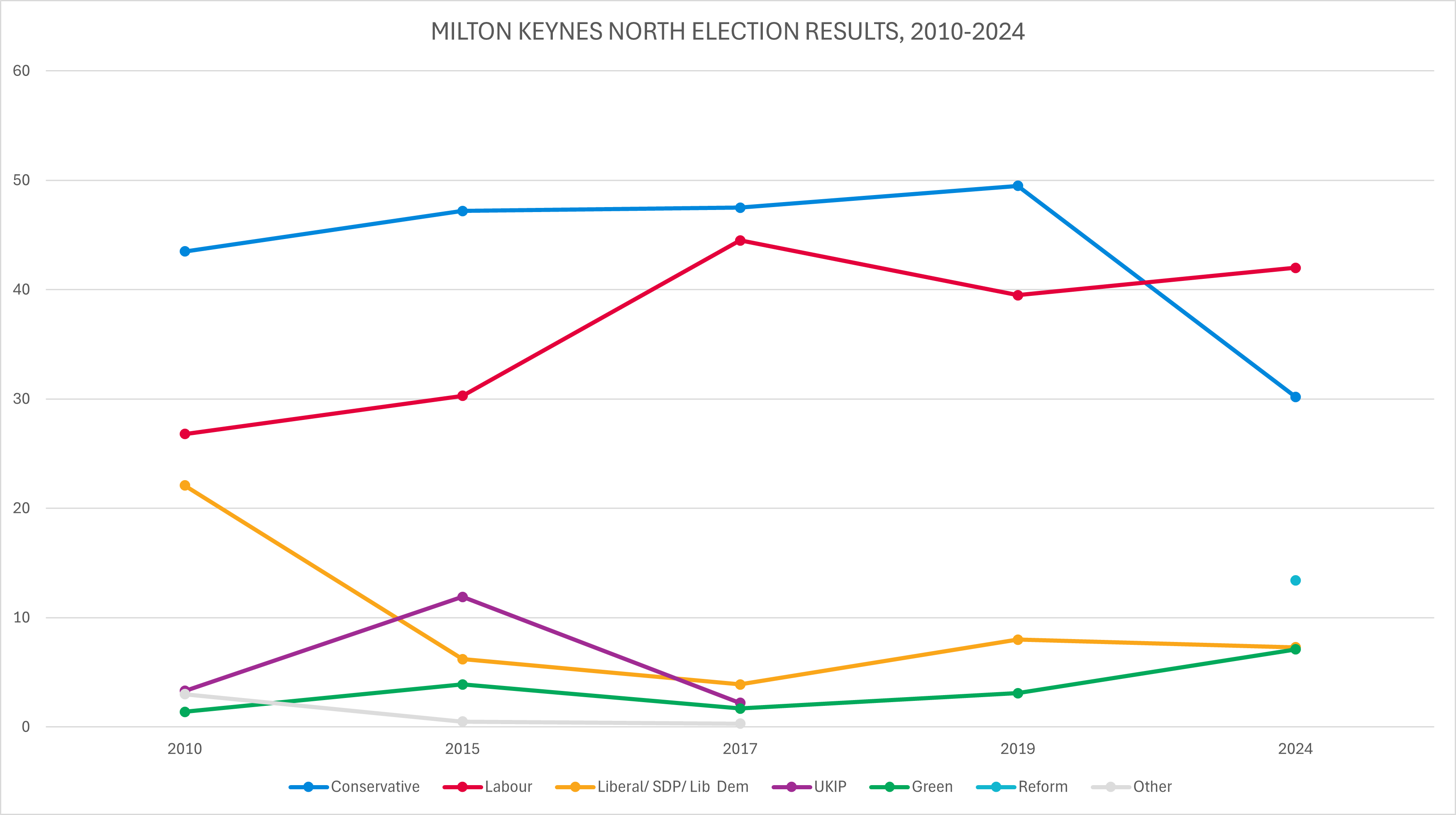
Election results 1950-2024

=== Elections in the 2020s ===
General election 2024: Milton Keynes North
Party	Candidate	Votes	%	±%
Labour	Chris Curtis	19,318	42.0	+3.5
Conservative	Ben Everitt	13,888	30.2	−21.4
Reform	Jane Duckworth	6,164	13.4	N/A
Liberal Democrats	Clare Tevlin	3,365	7.3	+0.6
Green	Alan Francis	3,242	7.1	+4.0
Majority		5,430	11.8	N/A
Turnout		45,977	65.0	–3.4
Registered electors		70,709		
Labour gain from Conservative		Swing	+12.5	

=== Elections in the 2010s ===
2019 notional result
Party	Vote	%
Conservative	24,933	51.6
Labour	18,606	38.5
Liberal Democrats	3,246	6.7
Green	1,499	3.1
Turnout	48,284	68.4
Electorate	70,620	

General election 2019: Milton Keynes North
Party	Candidate	Votes	%	±%
Conservative	Ben Everitt	30,938	49.5	+2.0
Labour	Charlynne Pullen	24,683	39.5	−5.0
Liberal Democrats	Aisha Mir	4,991	8.0	+4.1
Green	Catherine Rose	1,931	3.1	+1.4
Majority		6,255	10.0	+7.0
Turnout		62,543	68.3	−3.5
Conservative hold		Swing	+3.4	

General election 2017: Milton Keynes North
Party	Candidate	Votes	%	±%
Conservative	Mark Lancaster	30,367	47.5	+0.3
Labour	Charlynne Pullen	28,392	44.5	+14.2
Liberal Democrats	Imogen Shepherd-Dubey	2,499	3.9	−2.3
UKIP	Jeff Wyatt	1,390	2.2	−9.7
Green	Alan Francis	1,107	1.7	−2.2
CPA	Venetia Sams	169	0.3	New
Majority		1,975	3.0	−13.9
Turnout		64,044	71.8	+5.4
Conservative hold		Swing	−7.0	

General election 2015: Milton Keynes North
Party	Candidate	Votes	%	±%
Conservative	Mark Lancaster	27,244	47.2	+3.7
Labour	Emily Darlington	17,491	30.3	+3.5
UKIP	David Reilly	6,852	11.9	+8.6
Liberal Democrats	Paul Graham	3,575	6.2	−15.9
Green	Jennifer Marklew	2,255	3.9	+2.5
TUSC	Katie Simpson	163	0.3	New
Independent	David Mortimer	112	0.2	New
Majority		9,753	16.9	+0.2
Turnout		57,692	66.4	+0.6
Conservative hold		Swing	+0.1	

General election 2010: Milton Keynes North
Party	Candidate	Votes	%	±%
Conservative	Mark Lancaster	23,419	43.5	+7.3
Labour Co-op	Andrew Pakes	14,458	26.8	−11.1
Liberal Democrats	Jill Hope	11,894	22.1	+1.4
UKIP	Michael Phillips	1,772	3.3	+0.5
BNP	Richard Hamilton	1,154	2.1	New
Green	Alan Francis	733	1.4	−0.8
CPA	John Lennon	206	0.4	New
Monster Raving Loony	Matt "Bananamatt" Fensome	157	0.3	New
Independent	Anant Vyas	95	0.2	New
Majority		8,961	16.7	+18.4
Turnout		53,888	65.8	+2.0
Conservative hold		Swing	+9.2	

== See also ==
- List of parliamentary constituencies in Buckinghamshire
- List of parliamentary constituencies in the South East England (region)
- Buckingham and Bletchley (UK Parliament constituency)
- Milton Keynes South (UK Parliament constituency)
