= Milton Keynes Central (constituency) =

UK Parliament constituency (since 2024)

Coordinates: 52.03°N 0.72°W

- Borough constituency for the House of Commons
- Boundaries since 2024
- Boundary of Milton Keynes Central in South East England
- County: Buckinghamshire
- Electorate: 76,708 (2023)
- Major settlements: Milton Keynes

Current constituency
- Created: 2024
- Member of Parliament: Emily Darlington (Labour)
- Seats: One
- Created from: Milton Keynes South

Milton Keynes Central is a constituency of the House of Commons in the UK Parliament. Further to the completion of the 2023 review of Westminster constituencies, it was first contested in the 2024 general election. Since that election, it has been represented by Emily Darlington of the Labour Party.

== Constituency profile ==
Milton Keynes Central is a constituency in the City of Milton Keynes unitary authority in Buckinghamshire. It covers the centre and east of the city of Milton Keynes, including the neighbourhoods of Shenley, Loughton, Woughton, Broughton, Walton, Woolstone, Wavendon, Middleton, Willen, Monkston, Simpson and part of Bradwell. It also includes the small, outlying town of Woburn Sands.

The area that is today Milton Keynes was a rural area of small towns and villages until the late 1960s, when it was designated as a new town and developed to accommodate overspill from London. The city is known for its modernist architecture and grid road system. This constituency hosts the headquarters of the Open University, which is primarily a distance education institution and is the United Kingdom's largest university by number of students. There is some deprivation in the city centre and in the neighbourhoods to its immediate south, however most of the city is affluent and suburban in character. The average house price here is lower than the South East England average but higher than the national average.

Residents of Milton Keynes are generally young; there is a high working-age population and a low proportion of retirees. Residents have average levels of education and are less likely to be homeowners compared to the rest of the country. They have high rates of household income and a low rate of childhood poverty. A high proportion of residents work in the retail, transport and finance sectors, and the percentage claiming unemployment benefits is similar to the national figure. White people made up 66% of the population at the 2021 census. Asians, primarily Indians, were the largest ethnic minority group at 15%. Black people were 12%, most of whom were of African rather than Afro-Caribbean origin.

At the local city council, the city centre and the neighbourhoods to its south are mostly represented by the Labour Party, most of the suburbs elected Liberal Democrats and Woburn Sands elected Conservatives. An estimated 53% of voters in Milton Keynes Central supported remaining in the European Union in the 2016 referendum, higher than the nationwide figure of 48%.

== Boundaries ==
The constituency comprises the following wards of the City of Milton Keynes unitary authority area: The boundaries of these wards do not necessarily coincide with the civil parishes with the same or similar names.

- Broughton
- Campbell Park and Old Woughton
- Central Milton Keynes
- Danesborough and Walton
- Loughton & Shenley
- Monkston
- Shenley Brook End
- Woughton and Fishermead

It was formed from a minority of the abolished constituency of Milton Keynes South (the Shenleys, Loughton, Walton, Woughton on the Green, Wavendon and Woburn Sands), together with parts transferred from the continuing constituency of Milton Keynes North (Central Milton Keynes, Campbell Park, Old Woughton, Monkston, and Broughton). Again, the boundaries of these wards do not necessarily coincide with the civil parishes with the same or similar names.

== Members of Parliament ==
Milton Keynes South prior to 2024

| Election | Member | Party |
|---|---|---|
| 2024 | Emily Darlington | Labour |

== Elections ==
=== Elections in the 2020s ===
General election 2024: Milton Keynes Central
| Party | Candidate | Votes | % | ±% |
|---|---|---|---|---|
| Labour | Emily Darlington | 20,209 | 42.3 | +4.2 |
| Conservative | Johnny Luk | 12,918 | 27.1 | –20.4 |
| Reform | David Reilly | 6,245 | 13.1 | N/A |
| Liberal Democrats | James Cox | 4,931 | 10.3 | –0.1 |
| Green | Frances Bonney | 3,226 | 6.8 | +4.3 |
| Heritage | Alfred Saint-Clair | 200 | 0.4 | N/A |
| Majority | | 7,291 | 15.3 | N/A |
| Turnout | | 47,729 | 58.9 | –9.5 |
| Registered electors | | 81,078 | | |
| Labour gain from Conservative | | Swing | ▲12.3 | |

=== Elections in the 2010s ===
2019 notional result
| Party | Vote | % |
|---|---|---|
| Conservative | 25,035 | 47.5 |
| Labour | 20,083 | 38.1 |
| Liberal Democrats | 5,489 | 10.4 |
| Green | 1,297 | 2.5 |
| Others | 746 | 1.4 |
| Turnout | 52,650 | 68.6 |
| Electorate | 76,708 | |

== See also ==
- List of parliamentary constituencies in Buckinghamshire
- Parliamentary constituencies in South East England
