= Chris Curtis (politician) =

British politician (born 1994)

Chris Curtis MP
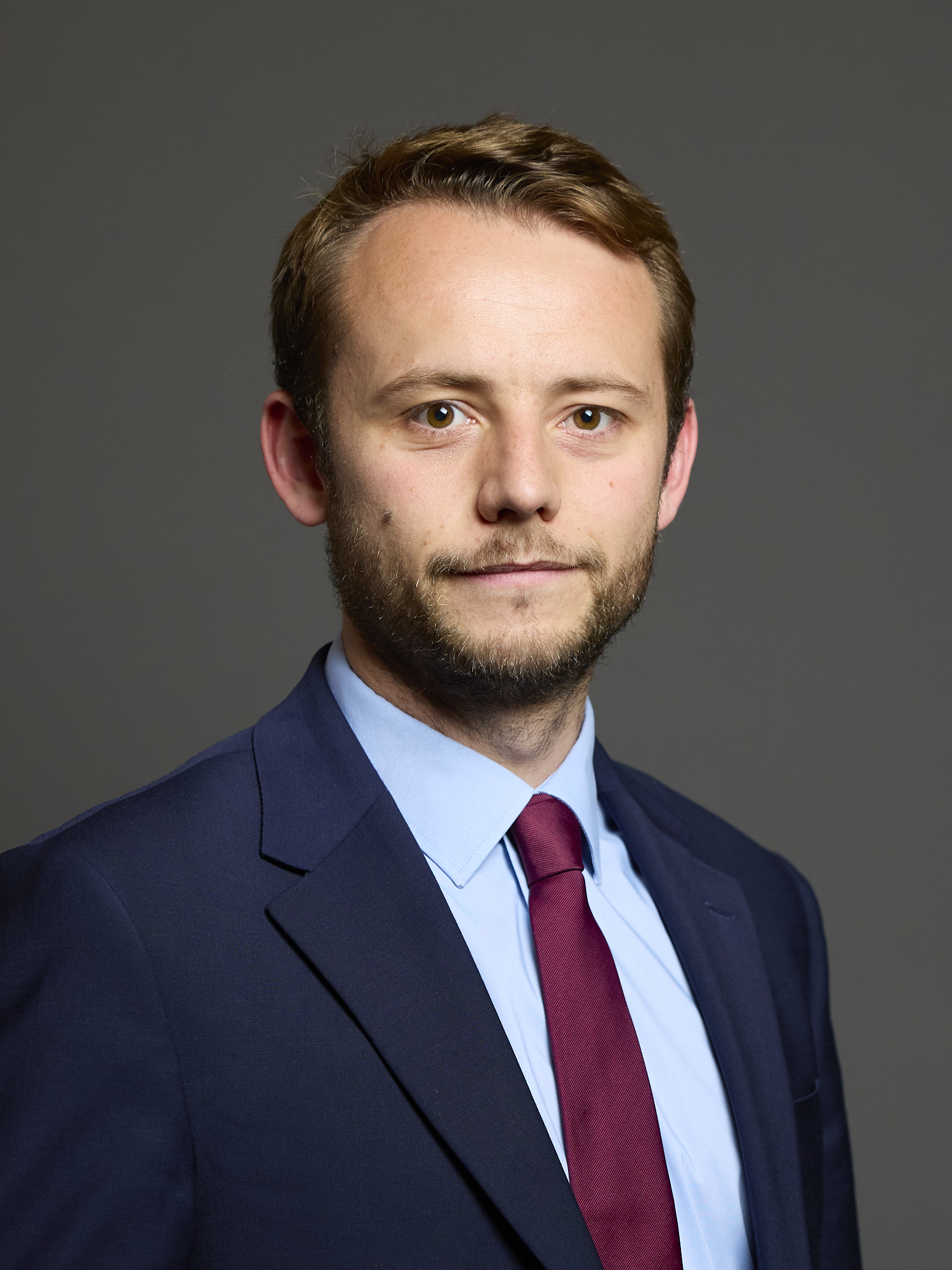
- Official portrait, 2024

Member of Parliament for Milton Keynes North
- Incumbent
- Assumed office 4 July 2024
- Preceded by: Ben Everitt
- Majority: 5,430 (11.8%)

Personal details
- Born: 17 March 1994 (age 32) Milton Keynes, Buckinghamshire, England
- Party: Labour
- Other political affiliations: Labour Growth Group
- Education: University of Exeter

Chris Curtis (born 17 March 1994) is a British Labour Party politician serving as the Member of Parliament (MP) for Milton Keynes North since 2024.

== Early and personal life ==
Curtis is from Milton Keynes. He graduated from the University of Exeter in 2015 with a Bachelor of Arts (BA) in politics. Curtis was a Member of the UK Youth Parliament.

He is a theme park enthusiast.

== Professional career ==
Curtis worked as a political research manager for YouGov and was a political researcher for them in 2017. He was later head of political polling at Opinium Research. In 2022, he alleged YouGov had stopped him from publishing the findings of a survey following a TV debate during the 2017 election campaign. He clarified his position after its founder Nadhim Zahawi denied he had wielded any influence.

Curtis also worked for think tank Labour Together.

== Political career ==
Curtis was selected as Labour's prospective parliamentary candidate for Milton Keynes North in November 2022. The selection process drew national media attention following the exclusion of local councillor and cabinet member Lauren Townsend from the shortlisting stage. Townsend, who had the endorsement of several trade unions including Unite and UNISON, was reportedly blocked during the party's due diligence process due to past social media activity, which included "liking" a tweet by Nicola Sturgeon regarding recovery from COVID-19. The local constituency party chair and other critics described the decision as a "stitch-up," while party figures defended the vetting process as necessary for candidate standard-setting. Following Townsend's exclusion, Curtis - who was backed by the Usdaw union - won the final selection vote among local members.

In November 2024, Curtis was appointed co-chair of the Labour Growth Group, a caucus of pro-growth Labour MPs.

In Parliament, Curtis serves as the chair of the All-Party Parliamentary Group (APPG) for Self-Driving Vehicles, having been appointed to the role in January 2025. The group provides a forum for parliamentarians and industry stakeholders to discuss the development of automated mobility and transport innovation.

In May 2026, during a Sky News interview, Curtis called for Keir Starmer to resign as Prime Minister following a string of defeats in the 2026 local elections, calling for a "radical change" in government.
