= Mid Buckinghamshire =

UK Parliament constituency (since 2024)

Coordinates: 51.78°N 0.88°W

- County constituency for the House of Commons
- Boundaries since 2024
- Boundary of Mid Buckinghamshire in South East England
- County: Buckinghamshire
- Electorate: 72,240 (2023)
- Major settlements: Great Missenden, Princes Risborough, Wendover, Haddenham

Current constituency
- Created: 2024
- Member of Parliament: Greg Smith (Conservative)
- Seats: One
- Created from: Buckingham

Mid Buckinghamshire is a constituency of the House of Commons in the UK Parliament. Further to the completion of the 2023 review of Westminster constituencies, it was first contested at the 2024 general election and is represented by Greg Smith, of the Conservative Party; Smith was previously MP for Buckingham from 2019 to 2024.

== Constituency profile ==
Mid Buckinghamshire is a constituency in Buckinghamshire. Its largest settlement is the town of Wendover, which has a population of around 9,000. Other settlements include the town of Princes Risborough and the villages of Stokenchurch, Walters Ash, Prestwood, Stoke Mandeville, Haddenham, Berryfields and Steeple Claydon.

This is a large, rural constituency with many small villages. The Chilterns, a National Landscape of chalk hills, passes through the south of the constituency. Wendover and Princes Risborough are historic small market towns and, like the rest of the constituency, are highly affluent with low levels of deprivation. The average house price is higher than the rest of South East England and nearly double the national average.

Residents of Mid Buckinghamshire are older than average due to the large retiree population. They are generally well-educated and have high rates of homeownership and household income. A large proportion of residents work in professional occupations and a very low percentage claim unemployment benefits. The child poverty rate is less than half the national figure. White people made up 91% of the population at the 2021 census.

Most of the constituency is represented by Conservatives at the local council with some Liberal Democrats elected in and around Wendover and Green Party councillors elected in Haddenham. An estimated 52% of voters in Mid Buckinghamshire supported remaining in the European Union in the 2016 referendum, higher than the nationwide figure of 48%.

== Boundaries ==
The constituency is composed of the following (as they existed on 1 December 2020):

- The District of Buckinghamshire wards of: Berryfield, Buckingham Park & Watermead (part); Chesham North (part); Grendon Underwood & The Claydons (part); Haddenham & Stone; Long Crendon; Princes Risborough; Ridgeway East; Ridgeway West (part); The Missendens (part); Waddesdon; Wendover, Halton and Stoke Mandeville.

It comprises the following areas:

- Western and southern areas of the abolished constituency of Buckingham, including Haddenham and Princes Risborough
- Southern parts of the Aylesbury constituency, including Wendover and the two Ridgeway wards
- Great Missenden, transferred from Chesham and Amersham

== Members of Parliament ==
Buckingham prior to 2024

Election	Member	Party
2024	Greg Smith	Conservative

== Elections ==
=== Elections in the 2020s ===
The Conservative candidate (and the incumbent member of Parliament, as of October 2025) and the Green candidate, both called Greg Smith, are not the same person.

General election 2024: Mid Buckinghamshire
Party	Candidate	Votes	%	±%
Conservative	Greg Smith	20,150	37.3	−24.2
Liberal Democrats	Anja Schaefer	14,278	26.5	+6.8
Labour	Carissma Griffiths	9,171	17.0	+1.7
Reform	Stephanie Harwood	6,926	12.8	+11.9
Green	Greg Smith	2,942	5.5	+2.8
SDP	Yvonne Wilding	337	0.6	N/A
Climate	Wisdom Da Costa	147	0.3	N/A
Majority		5,872	10.8	−31.0
Turnout		53,951	71.5	−3.6
Registered electors		75,415		
Conservative hold		Swing	−15.5	

=== Elections in the 2010s ===
2019 notional result
Party	Vote	%
Conservative	33,321	61.5
Liberal Democrats	10,673	19.7
Labour	8,283	15.3
Green	1,477	2.7
Brexit Party	469	0.9
Turnout	54,223	75.1
Electorate	72,240	

== See also ==
- List of parliamentary constituencies in Buckinghamshire
- List of parliamentary constituencies in the South East England (region)
