= Benyon =

Benyon is a surname. Notable people with the surname include:

- Edgar Benyon (1901–1978), New Zealand magician, juggler and entertainer
- Elliot Benyon, association football player for Torquay United
- Henry Benyon JP (1884–1959), the immediate post-War Lord Lieutenant of Berkshire
- James Herbert Benyon (1849–1935), early 20th century Lord Lieutenant of Berkshire
- Richard Benyon (born 1960), British politician
- Richard Benyon De Beauvoir (1796–1854), British landowner, philanthropist, and High Sheriff of Berkshire
- Richard Fellowes Benyon (1811–1897), British Conservative politician and civil servant
- Thomas Benyon (born 1942), British Conservative Party politician
- William Benyon (born 1930), British Conservative Party politician, Berkshire landowner, and former High Sheriff
