= Bill Benyon =

British politician (1930–2014)

Sir William Benyon DL

Member of Parliament for Milton Keynes Buckingham (1970–83)
- In office 18 June 1970 – 16 March 1992
- Preceded by: Robert Maxwell
- Succeeded by: Constituency abolished

Personal details
- Born: William Richard Shelley; 17 January 1930
- Died: 2 May 2014 (aged 84)
- Party: Conservative
- Children: 5, including Richard

Sir William Richard Benyon DL (né Shelley; 17 January 1930 – 2 May 2014) was a British Conservative Party politician, Berkshire landowner and high sheriff.

== Early life and career ==
Benyon was the eldest of four sons of Vice-Admiral Richard Shelley (1892–1968) and his wife, Eve Alice Gascoyne-Cecil, daughter of the Right Reverend Lord (Rupert Ernest) William Gascoyne-Cecil, Bishop of Exeter. William's father, Richard (son of Lieutenant-Colonel Sir John Shelley, 9th Bt., by Marion Emma Benyon, daughter of Richard Fellowes Benyon), changed his (and William's) surname from Shelley to Benyon in 1964 (by deed poll) after inheriting the Englefield estate from his second cousin, Sir Henry Benyon, 1st Bt., in 1959. The change of surname was confirmed in 1967 by Royal Licence.

Benyon joined the Royal Navy in 1943 (aged 13) and attended Britannia Royal Naval College, Dartmouth. He retired from the Navy as a Lieutenant in 1956 and became a member of The Castaways' Club soon thereafter. He was with Courtaulds Ltd until 1967.

== Political career ==
Benyon joined the Conservative Monday Club prior to 1970, when he was elected as Member of Parliament for Buckingham at the 1970 general election, defeating the incumbent Robert Maxwell, and retained his seat at the next three elections. At the 1983 general election he stood instead in the new Milton Keynes constituency, where he was re-elected until he retired at the 1992 general election. Due to its increased population, the Milton Keynes seat was then divided into two new constituencies: Milton Keynes North East and Milton Keynes South West. This was the only division of a constituency at the 1992 general election.

Benyon never held government office, but was PPS to Paul Channon 1972–74 when he was Minister for Housing, then was an Opposition whip from 1974 to 1976. He served as a member of the University of Reading Council from 1967 to 2002, was a member of Berkshire County Council from 1964 to 1974, a Deputy Lieutenant from 1970, a Berkshire JP 1962–77, Vice Lord Lieutenant for Berkshire from 1994 (the year he was knighted), and High Sheriff of Berkshire in 1995.

== Personal life ==
Benyon married Elizabeth Hallifax in 1957. They had two sons, three daughters and 18 grandchildren, who all survived him. His elder son, Richard Benyon, was the Conservative MP for Newbury from 2005 to 2019. His daughter, Mary, wife of Tom Riall, was appointed High Sheriff of Berkshire in April 2020.

He was chairman of the Peabody Trust, 1992–1998, and of the Ernest Cook Trust from 1992. He was a member of Boodle's, Pratt's and Beefsteak London clubs.

In May 1993, Benyon was awarded an honorary degree by the Open University as Doctor of the University. He lived at Englefield House until the last few years of his life and was a director of the Englefield Charitable Trust. He died on 2 May 2014, at age 84.

== Ancestors ==
Sir William's ancestors in three generations
Sir William Benyon, Kt (1994), DL (1970)	Vice-Admiral Richard Shelley, CB, CBE _{(recte Benyon, 1964) (1892–1968)} _{High Sheriff Bucks, 1958. (Succeeded his second cousin of Sir Henry Benyon, 1st & last Bt.)}	Sir John Shelley, 9th Bt., TD, DL, JP _{(1848–1931)}	Rev. Sir Frederic Shelley, 8th Baronet _{(1809–1869)} _{Descended from Sir William Shelley, Kt, MP, JP, (1478/9-1549), a lawyer, of Michelgrove, Patching, Clapham, Worthing, West Sussex, and related to recusants Sir Richard Shelley and Richard Shelley}
Sir William Benyon, Kt (1994), DL (1970)	Vice-Admiral Richard Shelley, CB, CBE _{(recte Benyon, 1964) (1892–1968)} _{High Sheriff Bucks, 1958. (Succeeded his second cousin of Sir Henry Benyon, 1st & last Bt.)}	Sir John Shelley, 9th Bt., TD, DL, JP _{(1848–1931)}	Charlotte Martha Hippisley _{(d.1893)} _{Daughter of the Rev. Henry Hippisley, of Lamborne Place and Sparsholt, Berks, by Anne daughter of Lock Rollinson of Chadlington.}
Sir William Benyon, Kt (1994), DL (1970)	Vice-Admiral Richard Shelley, CB, CBE _{(recte Benyon, 1964) (1892–1968)} _{High Sheriff Bucks, 1958. (Succeeded his second cousin of Sir Henry Benyon, 1st & last Bt.)}	Marion Emma Benyon _{(d.1948)} _{First cousin of James Herbert Benyon}	Richard Fellowes, MP, (recte Benyon, 1854) _{(1811–1897)} _{Son of William Henry Fellowes, MP, by Emma, daughter of Richard Benyon of Gidea Hall. Inherited most of the estates of his uncle Richard Benyon De Beauvoir, MP, DL, JP, of Englefield, De Beauvoir Town, the New River Company, Cranham Hall, North and South Ockendon (Essex), Newbury Park (Essex), Culford (Suffolk), and Downham (Essex). Distant kinsman of founder of Georgia, James Oglethorpe}
Sir William Benyon, Kt (1994), DL (1970)	Vice-Admiral Richard Shelley, CB, CBE _{(recte Benyon, 1964) (1892–1968)} _{High Sheriff Bucks, 1958. (Succeeded his second cousin of Sir Henry Benyon, 1st & last Bt.)}	Marion Emma Benyon _{(d.1948)} _{First cousin of James Herbert Benyon}	Elizabeth Mary Clutterbuck _{(1833–?)} _{Granddaughter of Robert Clutterbuck (1772–1831), JP, DL, FSA, of Watford. Her sister married William George Mount, MP}
Sir William Benyon, Kt (1994), DL (1970)	Eve Alice Gascoyne-Cecil _{(1900–1994)}	Rt. Rev. Lord William Cecil, Bishop of Exeter _{(1863–1936)}	Robert Gascoyne-Cecil, 3rd Marquess of Salisbury, KG, GCVO, PC _{(1830–1903). Prime Minister}
Sir William Benyon, Kt (1994), DL (1970)	Eve Alice Gascoyne-Cecil _{(1900–1994)}	Rt. Rev. Lord William Cecil, Bishop of Exeter _{(1863–1936)}	Georgina Alderson _{(1827–1899)} _{Daughter of Baron of the Exchequer and judge, Sir Edward Hall Alderson}
Sir William Benyon, Kt (1994), DL (1970)	Eve Alice Gascoyne-Cecil _{(1900–1994)}	Lady Florence Mary Bootle-Wilbraham _{(d.1944)}	Edward Bootle-Wilbraham, 1st Earl of Lathom, GCB, PC _{(1837–1898)}
Sir William Benyon, Kt (1994), DL (1970)	Eve Alice Gascoyne-Cecil _{(1900–1994)}	Lady Florence Mary Bootle-Wilbraham _{(d.1944)}	Lady Alice Villiers _{(c.1841–1897)} _{Daughter of George Villiers, 4th Earl of Clarendon, KG, GCB, PC, Foreign Secretary & Lord Privy Seal}

Parliament of the United Kingdom
Preceded by Robert Maxwell	Member of Parliament for Buckingham; 1970–1983	Succeeded by Himself as MP for Milton Keynes
Preceded by Robert Maxwell	Member of Parliament for Buckingham; 1970–1983	Succeeded by George Walden
Preceded by Himself as MP for Buckingham	Member of Parliament for Milton Keynes; 1983–1992	Succeeded by Peter Butler as MP for North East Milton Keynes
Preceded by Himself as MP for Buckingham	Member of Parliament for Milton Keynes; 1983–1992	Succeeded by Barry Legg as MP for Milton Keynes South West
