= Edith Benyon =

Edith Isabel Benyon GBE (1857–1919) was an English hospital commandant and charity worker who was one of the first people to be appointed Dame Grand Cross of the Order of the British Empire in 1918.

She was the daughter of Sir John Walrond, 1st Baronet. In 1875, she married James Herbert Fellowes. The couple changed their surname to Benyon in 1897 by royal licence. They had three daughters and a son, Henry Benyon.

Benyon served as President of the Berkshire branch of the Red Cross. In October 1914, she gave over part of her home, Englefield House, to be a hospital, and served as its commandant, overseeing a doctor, two nurses and about thirty women from the Voluntary Aid Detachment, with the help of her daughter Winifred. For this work, she was appointed Dame Grand Cross of the Order of the British Empire in the 1918 New Year Honours, one of six women to receive this newly established order on that occasion.

She held several other charitable positions including President of the Reading Care and Comforts Committee, Chairman of the County Nursing Association, President of the Ladies' Linen League at the Royal Berkshire Hospital, Vice-President of the League of Mercy, President of the Berkshire Girl Guides, and Patron of the Berkshire County Blind Society. She served as inaugural President of the charity which became Berkshire Vision.

Benyon died in 1919.
