= Tom Riall =

British businessman (born 1960)

Thomas Richard Phineas Riall (born 1960) is the Executive Chair of Mydentist.

== Biography ==
Tom Riall joined Integrated Dental Holdings (IDH) as Chief Executive Officer on 8 May 2017. Before this, he was Chief Executive Officer of Priory Group, Europe’s largest independent provider of mental health services, a role he held between April 2013 and December 2016. During this time, he led Priory through its successful sale by Advent International to Acadia Healthcare Services. Prior to this, Tom spent eight years at Serco Group, firstly as CEO of their UK Government Division and, latterly, running their Global Services Division, headquartered in Mumbai, India. Tom has completed the Advanced Management Programme at Harvard Business School; he holds an MBA from the City University Business School and a BA from Durham University. He is also the Non-Executive Chair of Kingsbridge Healthcare Group, a private equity backed specialist hospital group based in Ireland – a role that he has held since August 2019.

Riall took over as the CEO of Priory Group in April 2013. Prior to that appointment, he had been chief executive of Serco's global services business since June 2012. Serco is a UK company that provides a variety of services and products relating to defence, detention, aviation, and transport. Riall was previously divisional chief executive responsible for the company's home affairs division, which provides Gatso speed cameras to UK local authorities.

Prior to joining Serco in 2004, he was managing director of Reliance Secure Trust Management. Riall oversaw Reliance's successful tender in 2003 for the use of private contractors to transport prisoners in Scotland. When the firm mistakenly released a number of prisoners including a convicted murderer in 2004, Riall offered an apology while defending his company's performance.

Riall lives at Ufton Nervet, near Reading in Berkshire. His wife, Mary, daughter of Sir William Benyon, was appointed High Sheriff of Berkshire in April 2020.
