= Transport Select Committee =

UK House of Commons select committee

The Transport Select Committee is a select committee of the House of Commons in the Parliament of the United Kingdom. The remit of the committee is to examine the expenditure, administration and policy of the Department for Transport and its associated public bodies. Its powers, like those of other select committees, are provided for under standing order 152 of the Standing Orders of the House of Commons and its membership is limited to 11 members.

== Chairs ==
Committee chairs include those listed below.

Name	Start	End	Party	Constituency
Tom Bradley	3 May 1979	9 June 1983	Labour (1979–1981)	Leicester East
Tom Bradley	3 May 1979	9 June 1983	Social Democratic (1981–1983)	Leicester East
Harry Cowans	9 June 1983	27 March 1985	Labour	Tyne Bridge
Gordon Bagier	27 March 1985	18 May 1987	Labour	Sunderland South
David Marshall	17 June 1987	15 July 1992	Labour	Glasgow Shettleston
Robert Adley	15 July 1992	13 May 1993	Conservative	Christchurch
Paul Channon	30 June 1993	21 March 1997	Conservative	Southend West
Gwyneth Dunwoody	15 July 1997	17 April 2008	Labour	Crewe and Nantwich
Louise Ellman	21 May 2008	3 May 2017	Labour	Liverpool Riverside
Lilian Greenwood	13 July 2017	29 January 2020	Labour	Nottingham South
Huw Merriman	29 January 2020	28 October 2022	Labour	Bexhill and Battle
Iain Stewart	16 November 2022	30 May 2024	Conservative	Milton Keynes South
Ruth Cadbury	11 September 2024	present	Labour	Brentford and Isleworth

== Membership ==
Membership of the committee is as follows:

Member	Party	Constituency
Ruth Cadbury MP (Chair)	Labour	Brentford and Isleworth
Steff Aquarone MP	Liberal Democrats	North Norfolk
Scott Arthur MP	Labour	Edinburgh South West
Jacob Collier MP	Labour	Burton and Uttoxeter
Samantha Dixon MP	Labour	Chester North and Neston
Daniel Francis MP	Labour	Bexleyheath and Crayford
Olly Glover MP	Liberal Democrats	Didcot and Wantage
Katie Lam MP	Conservative	Weald of Kent
Alex Mayer MP	Labour	Dunstable and Leighton Buzzard
Joe Morris MP	Labour	Hexham
Rebecca Smith MP	Conservative	South West Devon

=== Changes since 2024 ===
Date	Outgoing Member & Party	Constituency	→	New Member & Party	Constituency	Source
27 October 2025	Catherine Atkinson MP (Labour)	Derby North	→	Jacob Collier MP (Labour)	Burton and Uttoxeter	Hansard
22 June 2026	Baggy Shanker MP (Labour)	Derby South	→	Daniel Francis MP (Labour)	Bexleyheath and Crayford	Hansard
26 October 2026	Elsie Blundell MP (Labour)	Heywood and Middleton North	→	Samantha Dixon MP (Labour)	Chester North and Neston	Hansard
2 November 2026	Laurence Turner MP (Labour)	Birmingham Northfield	→	Joe Morris MP (Labour)	Hexham	Hansard

== 2019-2024 Parliament ==
The chair was elected on 29 January 2020, with the members of the committee being announced on 2 March 2020.

Member	Party	Constituency
Huw Merriman MP (Chair)	Conservative	Bexhill and Battle
Ruth Cadbury MP	Labour	Brentford and Isleworth
Lilian Greenwood MP	Labour	Nottingham South
Simon Jupp MP	Conservative	East Devon
Robert Largan MP	Conservative	High Peak
Chris Loder MP	Conservative	West Dorset
Karl McCartney MP	Conservative	Lincoln
Grahame Morris MP	Labour	Easington
Gavin Newlands MP	Scottish National Party	Paisley and Renfrewshire North
Greg Smith MP	Conservative	Buckingham
Sam Tarry MP	Labour	Ilford South

=== Changes 2019-2024 ===
Date	Outgoing member and party	Constituency	→	New member and party	Constituency	Source
22 February 2021	Sam Tarry MP (Labour)	Ilford South	→	Ben Bradshaw MP (Labour)	Exeter	Hansard
5 January 2022	Lilian Greenwood MP (Labour)	Nottingham South	→	Navendu Mishra MP (Labour)	Stockport	Hansard
17 May 2022	Navendu Mishra MP (Labour)	Stockport	→	Christian Wakeford MP (Labour)	Bury South	Hansard
25 October 2022	Simon Jupp MP (Conservative)	East Devon	→	Jack Brereton MP (Conservative)	Stoke-on-Trent South	Hansard
27 October 2022	Huw Merriman MP (Chair, Conservative)	Bexhill and Battle	→	Vacant		Hansard
16 November 2022	Vacant		→	Iain Stewart MP (Chair, Conservative)	Milton Keynes South	Hansard
21 November 2022	Robert Largan MP (Conservative)	High Peak	→	Paul Howell MP (Conservative)	Sedgefield	Hansard
24 January 2023	Christian Wakeford MP (Labour)	Bury South	→	Mike Amesbury MP (Labour)	Weaver Vale	Hansard
17 July 2023	Chris Loder MP (Conservative)	West Dorset	→	Sara Britcliffe MP (Conservative)	Hyndburn	Hansard
20 November 2023	Mike Amesbury MP (Labour)	Weaver Vale	→	Fabian Hamilton MP (Labour)	Leeds North East	Hansard
20 November 2023	Ruth Cadbury MP (Labour)	Brentford and Isleworth	→	Mick Whitley MP (Labour)	Birkenhead	Hansard

== 2017-2019 Parliament ==
The election of the chair took place on 12 July 2017, with the members of the committee being announced on 11 September 2017.

Member	Party	Constituency
Lilian Greenwood MP (Chair)	Labour	Nottingham South
Ronnie Cowan MP	Scottish National Party	Inverclyde
Steve Double MP	Conservative	St Austell and Newquay
Paul Girvan MP	Democratic Unionist	South Antrim
Huw Merriman MP	Conservative	Bexhill and Battle
Luke Pollard MP	Labour Co-op	Plymouth Sutton and Devonport
Laura Smith MP	Labour	Crewe and Nantwich
Iain Stewart MP	Conservative	Milton Keynes South
Graham Stringer MP	Labour	Blackley & Broughton
Martin Vickers MP	Conservative	Cleethorpes
Daniel Zeichner MP	Labour	Cambridge

=== Changes 2017-2019 ===
Date	Outgoing member and party	Constituency	→	New member and party	Constituency	Source
5 February 2018	Laura Smith MP (Labour)	Crewe and Nantwich	→	Grahame Morris MP (Labour)	Easington	Hansard
8 May 2018	Martin Vickers MP (Conservative)	Cleethorpes	→	Jack Brereton MP (Conservative)	Stoke-on-Trent South	Hansard
29 October 2018	Luke Pollard MP (Labour)	Plymouth Sutton and Devonport	→	Ruth Cadbury MP (Labour)	Brentford and Isleworth	Hansard
5 November 2018	Iain Stewart MP (Conservative)	Milton Keynes South	→	Robert Courts MP (Conservative)	Witney	Hansard

== 2015-2017 Parliament ==
The chair was elected on 18 June 2015, with members being announced on 8 July 2015.

Member	Party	Constituency
Louise Ellman MP (Chair)	Labour	Liverpool Riverside
Robert Flello MP	Labour	Stoke-on-Trent South
Mary Glindon MP	Labour	North Tyneside
Karl McCartney MP	Conservative	Lincoln
Stewart McDonald MP	SNP	Glasgow South
Mark Menzies MP	Conservative	Fylde
Huw Merriman MP	Conservative	Bexhill and Battle
Will Quince MP	Conservative	Colchester
Iain Stewart MP	Conservative	Milton Keynes South
Graham Stringer MP	Labour	Blackley and Broughton
Martin Vickers MP	Conservative	Cleethorpes

=== Changes 2015-2017 ===
Date	Outgoing member and party	Constituency	→	New member and party	Constituency	Source
31 October 2016	Mary Glindon MP (Labour)	North Tyneside	→	Clive Efford MP (Labour)	Eltham	Hansard

== 2010-2015 Parliament ==
The chair was elected on 10 June 2010, with members being announced on 12 July 2010.

Member	Party	Constituency
Louise Ellman MP (Chair)	Labour	Liverpool Riverside
Angie Bray MP	Conservative	Ealing Central and Acton
Lilian Greenwood MP	Labour	Nottingham South
Tom Harris MP	Labour	Glasgow South
Kelvin Hopkins MP	Labour	Luton North
Kwasi Kwarteng MP	Conservative	Spelthorne
John Leech MP	Liberal Democrats	Manchester Withington
Paul Maynard MP	Conservative	Blackpool North and Cleveleys
Angela Smith MP	Labour	Penistone and Stocksbridge
Iain Stewart MP	Conservative	Milton Keynes South
Julian Sturdy MP	Conservative	York Outer

=== Changes 2010-2015 ===
Date	Outgoing member and party	Constituency	→	New member and party	Constituency	Source
2 November 2010	Angie Bray MP (Conservative)	Ealing Central and Acton	→	Steve Baker MP (Conservative)	Wycombe	Hansard
2 November 2010	Lilian Greenwood MP (Labour)	Nottingham South	→	Julie Hilling MP (Labour)	Bolton West	Hansard
2 November 2010	Angela Smith MP (Labour)	Sheffield Hillsborough	→	Gavin Shuker MP (Labour Co-op)	Luton South	Hansard
21 March 2011	Kelvin Hopkins MP (Labour)	Luton North	→	Jim Dobbin MP (Labour Co-op)	Heywood and Middleton	Hansard
18 July 2011	Gavin Shuker MP (Labour Co-op)	Luton South	→	Graham Stringer MP (Labour)	Blackley and Broughton	Hansard
5 November 2012	Paul Maynard MP (Conservative)	Blackpool North and Cleveleys	→	Karen Lumley MP (Conservative)	Redditch	Hansard
5 November 2012	Julian Sturdy MP (Conservative)	York Outer	→	Karl McCartney MP (Conservative)	Lincoln	Hansard
26 November 2012	Tom Harris MP (Labour)	Glasgow South	→	Lucy Powell MP (Labour Co-op)	Manchester Central	Hansard
10 December 2012	Julie Hilling MP (Labour)	Bolton West	→	Sarah Champion MP (Labour)	Rotherham	Hansard
21 January 2013	John Leech MP (Liberal Democrat)	Manchester Withington	→	Adrian Sanders MP (Liberal Democrat)	Torbay	Hansard
10 June 2013	Steve Baker MP (Conservative)	Wycombe	→	Jason McCartney MP (Conservative)	Colne Valley	Hansard
5 July 2013	Kwasi Kwarteng MP (Conservative)	Spelthorne	→	Martin Vickers MP (Conservative)	Cleethorpes	Hansard
4 November 2013	Lucy Powell MP (Labour)	Manchester Central	→	Jim Fitzpatrick MP (Labour)	Poplar and Limehouse	Hansard
4 November 2013	Iain Stewart MP (Conservative)	Milton Keynes South	→	Chloe Smith MP (Conservative)	Norwich North	Hansard
6 September 2014	Jim Dobbin MP (Labour Co-op)	Heywood and Middleton	→	Vacant		Death of member
1 December 2014	Vacant		→	Tom Harris MP (Labour)	Glasgow South	Hansard

== See also ==
- Parliamentary committees of the United Kingdom
