= Ronald Lancaster (chemist) =

English clergyman, chemist and businessman (1931–2026)

The Reverend Ronald Lancaster MBE CChem FRSC
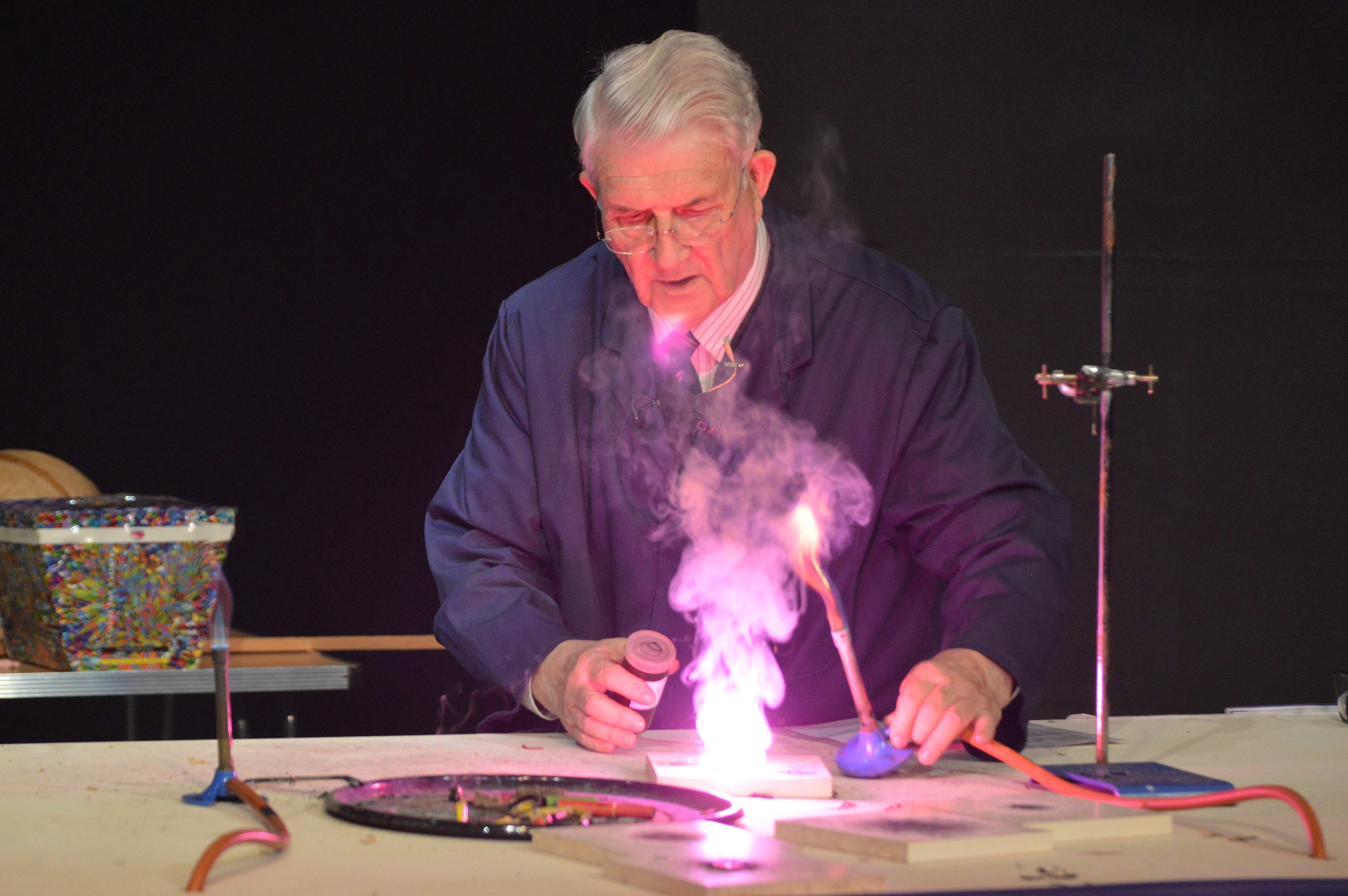
- Lancaster giving a fireworks demonstration at Kimbolton School, 2013
- Born: 9 March 1931; Huddersfield, England
- Died: 18 October 2026 (aged 95)
- Occupations: Chaplain; Chemistry teacher; Kimbolton Fireworks director

Ronald Lancaster MBE CChem FRSC (9 March 1931 – 18 October 2026) was an English Anglican clergyman, chemist, businessman and teacher, having taught chemistry at Kimbolton School from 1963 to 1988. He was a fireworks manufacturer, having founded and remained owner of Kimbolton Fireworks, the last manufacturer of fireworks in the UK before their closure in February 2019.

== Life and career ==
Lancaster was born on 9 March 1931, in Huddersfield, West Yorkshire, where he also grew up. It was here that Standard Fireworks and Lion Fireworks were based. He became interested in fireworks after the coronation of George VI in 1937. He attended King James's School in Almondbury from 1942 to 1950, and then studied psychology at St John's College, Durham University from 1950.

After national service, he studied theology at Cuddesdon in Oxfordshire between 1955 and 1957. He was ordained in the Church of England as a deacon in 1957 and as a priest in 1958. He served his curacy at St Peter's Church, Morley, West Yorkshire in the Diocese of Wakefield. He then moved to St Peter's Church, Harrogate in the Diocese of Ripon, serving as an assistant curate from 1960 to 1963.

He took up the post of chaplain and chemistry teacher at Kimbolton School in 1963. Later that year, he began producing fireworks at a workshop on the school grounds; the following year, with several other members of staff, he set up Kimbolton Fireworks to make pyrotechnics for public displays. The public displays put on by Kimbolton Fireworks include the 25th anniversary of the Queen's coronation in 1978, the 50th anniversary of VJ Day in 1995, the Hong Kong handover in 1997, and at the opening and closing ceremonies of the 2012 Summer Olympics in London.

With Takeo Shimizu, he published Fireworks: Principles and Practice in 1972; the fourth edition, described as the "bible of fireworks", was published in 2005.

Lancaster retired from teaching in 1988. He was given a plaque at the Pyrotechnics Guild International conference in 1984, dedicated to the "Master Blaster Pastor". He became a Member of the Order of the British Empire (MBE) in the 1993 New Year Honours, for his services to the fireworks industry, and he was presented with a plaque by the Royal Society of Chemistry in 2013.

He was the father of Mark Lancaster, who served as an explosives expert in the Royal Engineers, and was involved in running the fireworks business before he was elected as Conservative MP for Milton Keynes North East in 2005. Mark, husband of fellow Conservative MP Caroline Dinenage, stepped down in 2019 and was elevated to the House of Lords in 2020.

Ronald Lancaster died on 18 October 2026, aged 95.
