= Milton Keynes (disambiguation) =

Milton Keynes is a city in England, UK.

Milton Keynes may also refer to:

- Milton Keynes (village), the original village which gave its name to the city of Milton Keynes
- Milton Keynes urban area, the built-up area covering Milton Keynes
- City of Milton Keynes, the local government region covering Milton Keynes and nearby areas
- Milton Keynes (constituency), a parliamentary constituency which covered the entirety of the Borough of Milton Keynes between 1983 and 1992
