= Benyo =

Benyo is a surname. Notable people with the surname include:

- Richard Benyo (born 1946), American journalist and distance runner
- Yuriy Benyo (born 1974), Ukrainian footballer and manager

== See also ==
- Benyon
