= On Dandyism and George Brummell =

1845 essay by Jules-Amédée Barbey d'Aurevilly

On Dandyism and George Brummell (French: Du dandysme et de George Brummell, 1845), by Jules Barbey d'Aurevilly, is a biographic essay about the British dandy Beau Brummell (1778–1840) and about the way of life that is dandyism. In English, the essay "Du dandysme et de George Brummell" has been published under the titles "Of Dandyism and of George Brummell" and "The Anatomy of Dandyism".

== Composition ==
Barbey d'Aurevilly had no intention to write an exhaustive biography on Brummel—such a book had been written by William Jesse and published in 1844. His aim was instead to use Brummel's life to define what distinguishes the dandy. Brummel had lived in Calais and Caen in France, and Barbey d'Aurevilly met many of the people who had known Brummel during his time in the country.

Barbey d’Aurevilly later revisits his ideas on dandyism in his short story La veangeance d'une femme (1874), exploring in literary form his theory that fashion is power.

== Publication ==
When the book was finished it was first distributed among Brummel's French friends before it was printed in Paris. An English translation by Douglas Ainslie was published in 1897 as Of Dandyism and of George Brummell. D. B. Wyndham Lewis made a second translation which was published in 1928 as The Anatomy of Dandyism. A new translation by George Walden was published in 2002.
