= Phyllis Starkey =

British politician (born 1947)

Dr Phyllis Starkey

Member of Parliament for Milton Keynes South West
- In office 1 May 1997 – 12 April 2010
- Preceded by: Barry Legg
- Succeeded by: Iain Stewart

Personal details
- Born: 4 January 1947 (age 79) Ipswich, Suffolk, England
- Party: Labour
- Spouse: Hugh Walton Starkey
- Children: 2 daughters
- Education: Lady Margaret Hall, Oxford; Clare Hall, Cambridge

Phyllis Margaret Starkey (née Williams; born 4 January 1947) is a British Labour party politician, who was the Member of Parliament (MP) for Milton Keynes South West from 1997 to 2010. She had previously served as Leader of Oxford City Council.

== Early life ==
She was the daughter of Dr John Williams, a food chemist, and Catherine Hooson Williams. She attended the independent Perse School for Girls in Cambridge then read for a Bachelor of Arts degree in Biochemistry at Lady Margaret Hall, Oxford, graduating in 1970. In 1974, as a graduate student of Clare Hall, Cambridge, she was awarded the degree of Doctor of Philosophy by the University of Cambridge.

== Early career ==
Before she entered Parliament, Starkey's career was in biomedical research. Her early work with Alan Barrett at the University of Cambridge was in the field of biochemistry, and included formulating the trap hypothesis of peptidase inhibition. From 1974 to 1981, she was at the Strangeways Laboratory in Cambridge. She later headed a group at the University of Oxford researching problems of pregnancy. She was at the Sir William Dunn School of Pathology in Oxford from 1981 to 1984. She lectured in Obstetrics at the University of Oxford and was a fellow of Somerville College, Oxford, from 1984 to 1993.

Subsequently, she worked as an expert in science and technology policy and bioethics for the Biotechnology and Biological Sciences Research Council from 1993 to 1997. From 1997 to 1998 she was a fellow of St Antony's College, Oxford.

Starkey joined the Labour Party in 1974 and became a councillor on Oxford City Council in 1983. She held various positions on the council, including that of Leader of the council (1990–93) and Chair of the Finance Committee (1988–90 and 1993–96).

== Parliamentary career ==
Starkey was selected to stand for election for Labour through an all-women shortlist. As a female entrant to Parliament after the 1997 general election, Starkey was part of the intake dubbed 'The Blair Babes' by the UK media following a photoshoot by the Labour Party to show off how many women MPs were in the new government. Her Parliamentary voting record showed she was a staunch supporter of the legislation introduced by the Labour governments, including the occasional contentious issues within her party. Such were her Blairite credentials that Ken Livingstone, Labour's Mayor of London, dubbed her "Phyllis Stasi"

=== On the backbenches (1997–2001) ===
Starkey was a Member of the Select Committee on the Modernisation of the House of Commons between 1997 and 1999, during which time significant changes to parliamentary procedures were introduced, including the establishment of the Westminster Hall debating chamber and the beginning of alterations to sitting hours of Parliament to make them more 'family friendly'.

In 1998 Starkey highlighted the need for a national register for door supervisors (bouncers) to protect young people's safety while clubbing, and introduced a Private Members Bill to Parliament to establish one. Whilst her Bill did not succeed, the Government was persuaded of the need for a register, and it was incorporated into the Private Security Industry Act 2001 which led to the formation of the Security Industry Authority in 2003.

Between 1999 and 2001, Starkey was a member of the Foreign Affairs Select Committee.

=== Parliamentary Private Secretary (2001–2005) ===
After the 2001 general election Starkey was subsequently appointed Parliamentary Private Secretary (PPS) to junior Foreign Office Ministers Denis MacShane and Ben Bradshaw and from May–October 2002 was PPS to Denis MacShane and Mike O'Brien. In November 2002 she transferred to become PPS to Denis MacShane in his new role as Minister of State for Europe.

=== Select committee chair (2005–2010) ===
After the general election in May 2005, Starkey was appointed chair of the Committee on the Office of the Deputy Prime Minister. Following the reorganisation of Government Departments announced on 5 May 2006, the committee was renamed the Communities and Local Government Select Committee, though its role and the majority of its remit remained the same.

In 2006, there were some notable examples of Starkey becoming increasingly critical of the Prime Minister Tony Blair. In March she used a tough line of questioning during PMQs regarding the tensions between Israel and the Palestinian Authority, and in July during a Liaison Committee session with the PM she raised concerns in relation to the Government's work on education and employment for the Pakistani and Bangladeshi communities of Britain.

In 2007 Starkey along with Jeffrey Donaldson MP called for an investigation into the private security and military services firm ArmorGroup, who held contracts with the British Government for police training in Iraq and Afghanistan. She has also pressed the Government to regulate nail bars and for a ban on a potentially harmful chemical glue used in some outlets to affix fake nails.

Starkey took a close interest in the political situation in the Middle East in her last Parliament, and travelled to both Palestine and Lebanon. Her outspoken opinion on the Israeli incursion into Lebanon in 2006 was firmly at odds with the Labour leadership. In a pop quiz of MPs involved in Middle East issues run by The Sunday Times newspaper in 2007, Starkey was commended along with Conservative MP Andrew Rosindell for getting the highest score, with all but one answer correct.

Starkey was comparatively untroubled by The Daily Telegraph's investigation of the MPs' expenses scandal in 2009, though she was one of the MPs to have travelled abroad as a guest of the British Council, a taxpayer-funded organisation, which became the subject of controversy when the Speaker Michael Martin withheld information relating to the declaration of the hospitality provided. Starkey said she could not remember if she had spoken to the Registrar about her trip, but was of the opinion she did not have to declare a trip that was effectively paid for by the Government and the taxpayer; a position endorsed by the Commons Registrar of Members' Interests.

=== Defeat ===
At the 2010 general election, Starkey ran in the redrawn seat of Milton Keynes South but lost to Conservative candidate Iain Stewart, whom she had previously defeated in 2001 and 2005.

== Personal life ==
She married Hugh Walton Starkey on 6 September 1969. They have two daughters.

Parliament of the United Kingdom
Preceded by Barry Legg	Member of Parliament for Milton Keynes South West; 1997–2010	Constituency abolished
