= Brian White (British politician) =

British politician (1957–2016)

- White as an MP

Member of Parliament for North East Milton Keynes
- In office 1 May 1997 – 11 April 2005
- Preceded by: Peter Butler
- Succeeded by: Mark Lancaster

Personal details
- Born: Brian Arthur Robert White; 5 May 1957 Belfast, Northern Ireland
- Died: 5 July 2016 (aged 59) Milton Keynes, England
- Party: Labour
- Spouse: Leena Lindholm (m. 1984)
- Children: 2 (stepsons)
- Education: Methodist College Belfast
- Website: Official website

Brian Arthur Robert White (5 May 1957 – 5 July 2016) was a British Labour politician. He served as Member of Parliament (MP) for North East Milton Keynes from the 1997 general election, but lost his seat in 2005.

== Early life ==
He attended the Methodist College Belfast grammar school in Belfast.

He worked for HM Customs and Excise in Southend-on-Sea on the design of the VAT accounting system, then became an IT consultant, working in the US, Finland and Canada, and for Abbey National until 1997.

== Political career ==
=== Parliament ===
White was first elected to Parliament when Labour returned to power at the 1997 general election with a 240-vote majority, when he overturned the Conservative Peter Butler's majority of 14,000 obtained at the previous election.

He was returned at the 2001 election with a slightly increased majority of 1,829, but at the 2005 election, he lost his seat to the Conservative candidate Mark Lancaster whose 1,665 majority represented a 3.6% swing.

=== Local government ===
Before his election to Parliament in 1997, White had been a Labour member of Buckinghamshire County Council, Deputy Leader of Milton Keynes Council, and Secretary of the Local Government Association Labour Group. He had joined the local council in 1987 but resigned to take his seat in Parliament.

In the local elections of May 2007, he was elected to Milton Keynes Council as a member for Stantonbury. He was re-elected in May 2011 and May 2014. He served as Mayor of Milton Keynes for a year from May 2013.

=== Other ===
He was a past Chair of the National Energy Foundation, Chair of United Sustainable Energy Agency and was on the Board of the Renewable Fuels Agency. He was a key figure in establishing Careers-Action a charity formed to help management and professional level job seekers with job search training, information, resources and support.

== Personal life ==
He married Leena Lindholm on 4 July 1984 in Finland. He had two stepsons.

In late June 2016, White was diagnosed with an incurable cancer of the oesophagus, which had metastasised. He died at Milton Keynes Hospital on 5 July 2016. He was 59.

Parliament of the United Kingdom
Preceded by Peter Butler	Member of Parliament for North East Milton Keynes; 1997–2005	Succeeded by Mark Lancaster
