= Milton Keynes South West =

UK Parliament constituency (1992–2010)

Coordinates: 52.009°N 0.721°W

- Former borough constituency for the House of Commons
- Boundary of Milton Keynes South West in Buckinghamshire for the 2005 general election

- Location of Buckinghamshire within England
- County: Buckinghamshire

1992–2010
- Seats: One
- Created from: Milton Keynes and Buckingham
- Replaced by: Milton Keynes North, Milton Keynes South

Milton Keynes South West was a constituency represented in the House of Commons of the Parliament of the United Kingdom from 1992 to 2010. It elected one Member of Parliament (MP) by the first past the post system of election.

== History ==
Construction of Milton Keynes began in 1967, as a new town. Until 1983, it was part of the Buckingham constituency. As its population grew, Milton Keynes then gained its own constituency, which was taken by William Benyon of the Conservative Party.

Uniquely outside the normal cycle of periodic reviews by the Boundary Commission, the continuing expansion in the population of Milton Keynes led to this constituency being divided in two for the 1992 general election (Milton Keynes South West and North East Milton Keynes).

The new South West constituency was taken by Barry Legg of the Conservatives, who lost the seat to Labour's Phyllis Starkey in the 1997 election. The Milton Keynes South West seat was abolished, and replaced with the Milton Keynes South seat for the 2010 general election. Phyllis Starkey ran in the Milton Keynes South seat, but lost to the Conservative candidate Iain Stewart.

== Boundaries ==
The constituency was one of two covering the Borough of Milton Keynes. It included the more urban parts of the borough: Bletchley, Fenny Stratford, Loughton, the Shenleys, Stony Stratford and more modern districts in between.

The constituency consisted of 12 electoral wards of the Borough of Milton Keynes: Church Green, Denbigh, Eaton, Fenny Stratford, Loughton, Manor Farm, Newton, Stony Stratford, Whaddon, Wolverton, Wolverton Stacey Bushes, and Woughton.

The Stony Stratford, Wolverton and Wolverton Stacey Bushes wards were transferred from the Buckingham constituency.

=== Boundary review ===
Following their review of parliamentary representation in Buckinghamshire, the Boundary Commission for England created two new seats for Milton Keynes, effectively replacing the current South West/North East division with a North and South division from the 2010 general election.

Milton Keynes North was formed from the electoral wards of Bradwell, Campbell Park, Hanslope Park, Linford North, Linford South, Middleton, Newport Pagnell North, Newport Pagnell South, Olney, Sherington, Stantonbury and Wolverton.

Milton Keynes South was formed from the electoral wards of Bletchley and Fenny Stratford, Danesborough, Denbigh, Eaton Manor, Emerson Valley, Furzton, Loughton Park, Stony Stratford, Walton Park, Whaddon and Woughton.

== Members of Parliament ==
Election	Member	Party
1992	Barry Legg	Conservative
1997	Phyllis Starkey	Labour
2010	Constituency abolished: see Milton Keynes North and Milton Keynes South	

== Elections ==
=== Elections in the 2000s ===
General election 2005: Milton Keynes South West
Party	Candidate	Votes	%	±%
Labour	Phyllis Starkey	20,862	42.4	−7.1
Conservative	Iain Stewart	16,852	34.2	0.0
Liberal Democrats	Neil Stuart	7,909	16.1	+5.5
UKIP	George Harlock	1,750	3.6	+1.7
Green	Alan Francis	1,336	2.7	+0.6
Majority		4,010	8.2	−7.1
Turnout		49,209	59.8	−2.5
Labour hold		Swing	−3.6	

General election 2001: Milton Keynes South West
Party	Candidate	Votes	%	±%
Labour	Phyllis Starkey	22,484	49.5	−4.3
Conservative	Iain Stewart	15,506	34.2	+0.7
Liberal Democrats	Nazar Mohammed	4,828	10.6	−1.4
Green	Alan Francis	957	2.1	New
UKIP	Clive Davies	848	1.9	New
Legalise Cannabis	Patman Denning	500	1.1	New
Socialist Alliance	Dave Bradbury	261	0.6	New
Majority		6,978	15.3	−5.0
Turnout		45,384	62.3	−9.1
Labour hold		Swing		

=== Elections in the 1990s ===
General election 1997: Milton Keynes South West
Party	Candidate	Votes	%	±%
Labour	Phyllis Starkey	27,298	53.8	+16.4
Conservative	Barry Legg	17,006	33.5	−13.1
Liberal Democrats	Peter Jones	6,065	12.0	−2.5
Natural Law	Hugh Kelly	389	0.8	+0.4
Majority		10,092	20.3	N/A
Turnout		50,758	71.4	−5.6
Labour gain from Conservative		Swing	+14.6	

General election 1992: Milton Keynes South West
Party	Candidate	Votes	%	±%
Conservative	Barry Legg	23,840	46.6	
Labour	Kevin Wilson	19,153	37.4	
Liberal Democrats	Chris Pym	7,429	14.5	
Green	Caroline Field	525	1.0	
Natural Law	H. Kelly	202	0.4	
Majority		4,687	9.2	
Turnout		51,149	77.0	
Conservative win (new seat)				

== See also ==
- Milton Keynes North East
- List of parliamentary constituencies in Buckinghamshire
