= Ruth Cadbury =

British politician

Ruth Cadbury MP
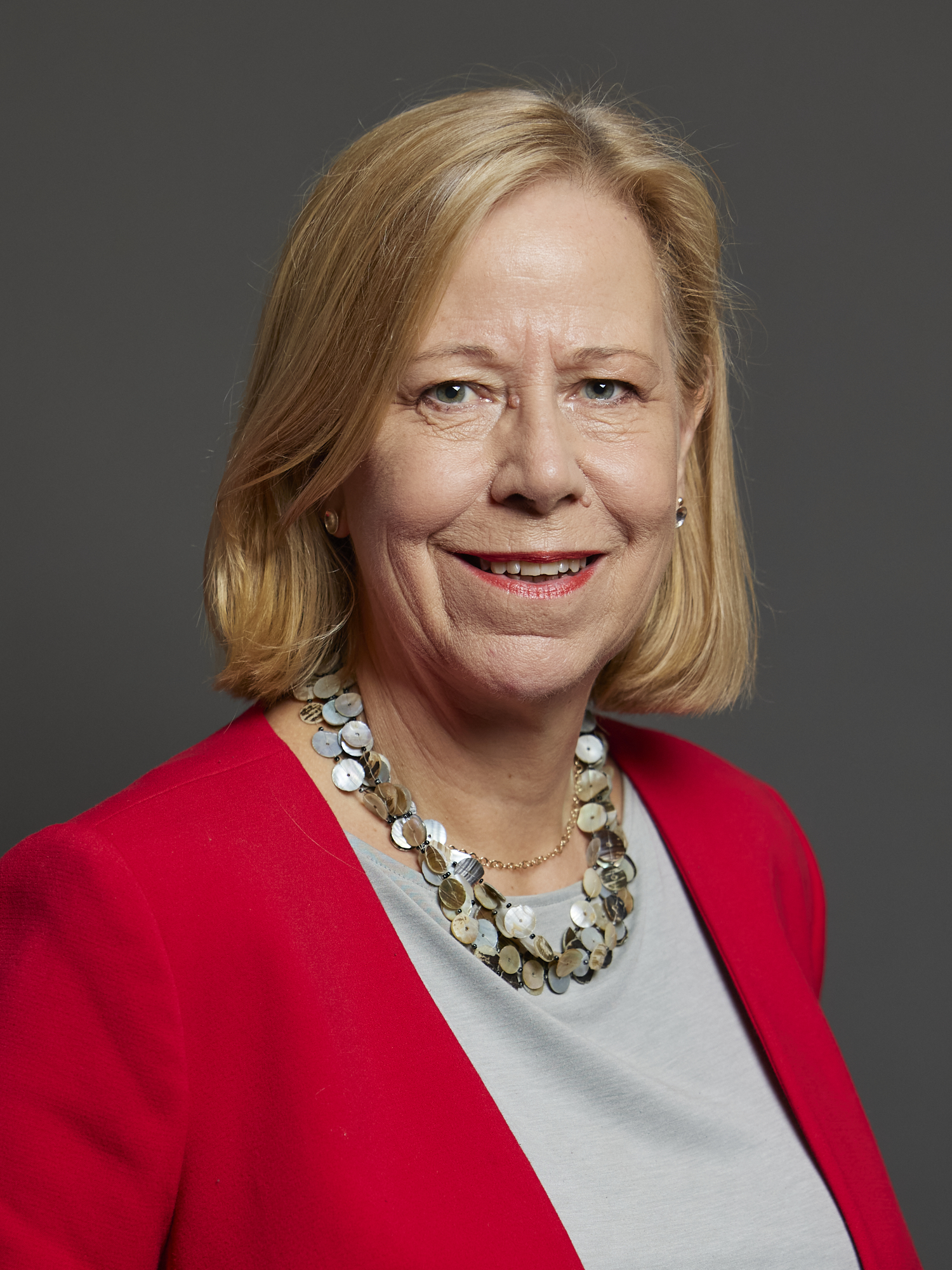
- Official portrait, 2024

Chair of the Transport Committee
- Incumbent
- Assumed office 11 September 2024
- Preceded by: Iain Stewart

Member of Parliament for Brentford and Isleworth
- Incumbent
- Assumed office 7 May 2015
- Preceded by: Mary Macleod
- Majority: 9,824 (21.7%)

Member of Hounslow Council
- In office 8 May 1986 – 29 May 2015
- Succeeded by: Guy Lambert
- Constituency: Gunnersbury (1986–1998); Brentford Clifden (1998–2002); Brentford (2002–2015)

Personal details
- Born: Ruth Margaret Cadbury; 14 May 1959 (age 67) Birmingham, England
- Party: Labour
- Relations: Cadbury family
- Education: University of Salford (BSc)
- Occupation: Politician; planner
- Website: Official website

Ruth Margaret Cadbury (born 14 May 1959) is a British politician and planner who has served as Member of Parliament (MP) for Brentford and Isleworth since 2015. A member of the Labour Party, she was a Member of Hounslow Council from 1986 to 2015 and Deputy Leader of the Council from 2010 to 2012.

== Early life and education ==
Ruth Margaret Cadbury was born on 14 May 1959 in Birmingham, England. She is the eldest child of Charles Cadbury and Jill Ransome. She is a member of the Cadbury family, a notable Quaker family which includes the Cadbury chocolate company founders.

Cadbury was educated at The Mount School, a private Quaker boarding school, and later Bournville College in Birmingham. She graduated from the University of Salford in 1981, with a Bachelor of Science degree in Social Sciences.

== Career ==
From 1983 to 1989, Cadbury worked for the Covent Garden Community Association. She was then a Planning Advisor at Planning Aid for London for the next seven years, before beginning work as a Policy Planner at the London Borough of Richmond upon Thames for five years. She was a freelance planning consultant from 2006 to 2014.

Cadbury was first elected as a Labour councillor for the Gunnersbury ward of Hounslow London Borough Council in 1986, before being elected for the Brentford Clifden ward in 1998 and the Brentford ward in 2002. She was Deputy Leader of the council from 2010 to 2012, and stood down as a councillor in May 2015.

== Parliamentary career ==
At the 2015 general election, Cadbury was elected to Parliament as MP for Brentford and Isleworth with 43.8% of the vote and a majority of 465. In her maiden speech to the House of Commons on 2 June 2015, she referenced her Quaker background and its relevance to social justice.

In December 2015, she voted against military intervention in Syria.

In October 2016, she was appointed by Labour Party leader Jeremy Corbyn as a Shadow Housing Minister. She supported Owen Smith in the failed attempt to replace Jeremy Corbyn in the 2016 Labour leadership election.

At the snap 2017 general election, Cadbury was re-elected as MP for Brentford and Isleworth with an increased vote share of 57.4% and an increased majority of 12,182.

Cadbury was dismissed as Shadow Housing Minister on 29 June 2017 for contravening a whipped vote on an amendment to the Queen's speech calling for the UK to remain in the European single market; whilst the Labour position was to abstain, she voted to support the motion.

She voted in the unsuccessful no ('Noes') lobby in a key House of Commons division of 25 June 2018 for the National Policy Statement on Airports, which laid out government support for a third runway, and she was among 28 of the 46 London Labour MPs opposing the runway.

At the 2019 general election, Cadbury was again re-elected, with a decreased vote share of 50.2% and a decreased majority of 10,514.

Cadbury re-joined the Labour front bench in May 2021 as the Shadow Minister for Planning, receiving half of Mike Amesbury's former brief as the Shadow Minister for Housing and Planning. In Keir Starmer's front bench reshuffle of November 2021, Cadbury was appointed Shadow Trade Minister. In his reshuffle in September 2023, she was appointed Shadow Minister for Prisons, Parole and Probation.

At the 2024 general election, Cadbury was again re-elected with a decreased vote share of 44.2% and a decreased majority of 9,824.

In September 2024 she was elected as Chair of the Commons Transport Select Committee.

Cadbury is a co-sponsor of Kim Leadbeater's Terminally Ill Adults (End of Life) Bill on assisted suicide.

== Personal life ==
Cadbury is a Nontheist Quaker and humanist. In 2022, she became a Vice Chair of the All-Party Parliamentary Humanist Group, which meets to discuss issues of relevance to humanists. She is an honorary associate of the National Secular Society.

Cadbury is married to Nick Gash, a non-executive director of the Imperial College Healthcare NHS Trust and former chair of West Middlesex Hospital (Cadbury's constituency local hospital).

Parliament of the United Kingdom
Preceded by Mary Macleod	Member of Parliament for Brentford and Isleworth; 2015–present	Incumbent
