= Milton Keynes (constituency) =

UK Parliament constituency (1983–1992)

- Former borough constituency for the House of Commons
- Boundary of Milton Keynes in Buckinghamshire for the 1987 general election

- Location of Buckinghamshire within England
- County: Buckinghamshire
- Major settlements: Milton Keynes

1983–1992
- Seats: One
- Created from: Buckingham
- Replaced by: North East Milton Keynes and Milton Keynes South West

Milton Keynes was a borough constituency represented in the House of Commons of the Parliament of the United Kingdom from 1983 until 1992.

It covered much of the then recently created Borough of Milton Keynes in Buckinghamshire, including most of the 1967 designated area of Milton Keynes together with Newport Pagnell, Olney and the rural area to the north of Milton Keynes. Three wards in the northwest of the borough were excluded.

== History ==
The Borough of Milton Keynes was established in 1974 by the Local Government Act 1972, seven years after Milton Keynes was designated as a New Town. Before 1983, the Borough was part of the Buckingham constituency; however, its population had expanded to such an extent that the new constituency of Milton Keynes was created for the 1983 general election. It comprised the Borough of Milton Keynes, except for the wards of Stony Stratford, Wolverton and Wolverton Stacey Bushes, which were retained by Buckingham.

The sitting Buckingham MP, William Benyon of the Conservative Party, was elected for the new seat, and was its only ever MP. The constituency's electorate expanded dramatically as Milton Keynes' population continued to grow over the period; on its creation in 1983 it had an electorate of 79,229, already above average for a parliamentary constituency, and by 1987 its electorate was 97,041, larger than any other constituency in the UK except the Isle of Wight, which at the time was legally prevented from being divided into multiple constituencies.

If it had remained undivided at the 1992 election, it would have had an electorate of 129,170, around twice the national average. Because of this unusually large and rapid population growth, and uniquely outside the normal cycle of periodic reviews by the Boundaries Commission, Milton Keynes was split into two constituencies for the 1992 general election: North East Milton Keynes and Milton Keynes South West.

== Boundaries ==
The Borough of Milton Keynes wards of Bradwell, Church Green, Danesborough, Denbigh, Eaton, Fenny Stratford, Lavendon, Linford, Loughton, Manor Farm, Newport Pagnell, Newton, Olney, Pineham, Sherington, Stantonbury, Whaddon, Woburn Sands, and Woughton.

== Members of Parliament ==
Election	Member	Party
1983	William Benyon	Conservative
1992	constituency divided	

== Elections ==
1979 notional result
Party	Vote	%
Conservative	23,150	50.0
Labour	16,411	35.4
Liberal	6,306	13.6
Others	460	1.0
Turnout	46,327	
Electorate		

General election 1983: Milton Keynes
Party	Candidate	Votes	%	±%
Conservative	William Benyon	28,181	48.0	–1.9
SDP	Janet Nightingale	16,659	28.3	+14.8
Labour	James Thakoordin	13,045	22.2	–13.2
Ecology	A H Francis	494	0.8	New
BNP	Ronald G W Rickcord	290	0.5	New
Majority		11,522	19.6	+5.1
Turnout		58,669	74.0	
Conservative win (new seat)				

General election 1987: Milton Keynes
Party	Candidate	Votes	%	±%
Conservative	William Benyon	35,396	47.8	−0.2
SDP	Bill Rodgers	21,695	29.3	+1.0
Labour	Yvonne Brownfield-Pope	16,111	21.8	−0.4
Green	Alan Francis	810	1.1	+0.3
Majority		13,701	18.5	−1.2
Turnout		74,012	76.3	+2.3
Conservative hold		Swing	-0.6	

== Sources ==
- United Kingdom Election Results

== See also ==
- Buckingham and Bletchley (UK Parliament constituency) (2023– )
- Milton Keynes Central (UK Parliament constituency) (2023– )
- Milton Keynes North (UK Parliament constituency) (2010– ) (boundary revised 2023)
- Milton Keynes South (UK Parliament constituency) (2010–2023 )

- North East Milton Keynes (UK Parliament constituency) (1992–2010)
- Milton Keynes South West (UK Parliament constituency) (1992–2010)
