= George Walden =

Former English politician (born 1939)

Member of Parliament for Buckingham
- In office 9 June 1983 – 8 April 1997
- Preceded by: Sir Bill Benyon
- Succeeded by: John Bercow

Personal details
- Born: 15 September 1939 (age 86)
- Party: Conservative
- Spouse: Sarah Hunt (m. 1970)
- Children: 3, including Celia
- Education: Latymer Upper School
- Alma mater: Jesus College, Cambridge; Moscow University
- Occupation: Journalist, diplomat, politician

George Gordon Harvey Walden CMG (born 15 September 1939) is an English journalist, former diplomat and former politician for the Conservative Party, who served as Member of Parliament (MP) for Buckingham from 1983 to 1997 and Minister for Higher Education under Margaret Thatcher.

== Early life and education ==
Walden was educated at Latymer Upper School in Hammersmith, London, at Jesus College, Cambridge, where he read medieval and modern languages, and for post-graduate studies at Moscow University. While at Cambridge, Walden played drums in the University's jazz band, performing alongside Dave Gelly and Art Themen.

During his time in the diplomatic service, Walden studied Chinese at the University of Hong Kong (1965–67), spent a year at the École nationale d'administration (ÉNA, then located in Paris), from 1973 to 1974, and a sabbatical year at Harvard (1981–82).

== Diplomat ==
Walden joined the Foreign Office in 1962 and worked there as a researcher until 1965, when he went to Hong Kong to study Chinese. After that, he was posted as Second Secretary in the office of the British Chargé d'Affaires in Peking, from 1967 to 1970 (there was no ambassador at that time). As First Secretary, he was at the Soviet Desk in the Foreign and Commonwealth Office (FCO) from 1970 to 1973 (during which time he was formally appointed an Officer in the Diplomatic Service) and, after his year at ÉNA, at the British Embassy in Paris (1974–78). He was then appointed Principal Private Secretary to the Secretary of State for Foreign and Commonwealth Affairs, serving David Owen and Lord Carrington, for which he was decorated CMG in the New Year Honours of 1981. After his sabbatical at Harvard, he was head of the planning staff at the FCO (1982–83), and then left the Diplomatic Service to stand for Parliament.

== Politician ==
Walden was elected as the MP for Buckingham at the 1983 general election. He was Parliamentary private secretary to the then Secretary of State for Education and Science, Sir Keith Joseph (1984–85) and Minister for Higher Education (1985–87). He was re-elected in 1987 and 1992 and retired from parliament at the 1997 general election. His successor was future Speaker of the House of Commons John Bercow.

== Journalist ==
Walden wrote a column for the Evening Standard (1991–2002) and now writes for various papers as a guest columnist.

== Family ==
In 1970, Walden married the art historian Sarah Hunt, daughter of Dr Thomas Hunt, physician to Winston Churchill, Clement Attlee and Anthony Eden. They have two sons and a daughter, the journalist, novelist and critic Celia Pughe-Morgan. Pughe-Morgan is married to journalist Piers Morgan.

== Publications ==
- The Shoeblack and the Sovereign: Reflections on Ethics and Foreign Policy, New York: St. Martin's Press, 1988. ISBN 0312022816
- The Blocked Society, Cambridge: Tory Reform Group, 1990
- Ethics and Foreign Policy, London: Weidenfeld & Nicolson, 1990. ISBN 978-0-297-82021-5
- We Should Know Better: Solving the Education Crisis, London: Fourth Estate, 1996. ISBN 1857025202
- Lucky George: Memoirs of an Anti-Politician, London: Allen Lane, 1999. ISBN 0713993162
- The New Elites: Making a Career in the Masses, London: Allen Lane, 2000. ISBN 0713993170
- Who's a Dandy?: Dandyism and Beau Brummell (including a translation of Du Dandysme et de Georges Brummel by Jules Barbey), London: Gibson Square, 2002. ISBN 1903933188
- God Won't Save America: Psychosis of a Nation, London: Gibson Square, 2006. ISBN 190393379X
- Time to Emigrate?, London: Gibson Square, 2006. ISBN 1903933935 (new edition 2007, ISBN 1906142009)
- China: A Wolf in the World?, London: Gibson Square, 2011. ISBN 1906142173

== Bibliography ==
- "WALDEN, George Gordon Harvey", Who's Who 2012, A & C Black, 2012; online edn, Oxford University Press, December 2011, retrieved 21 August 2012

Diplomatic posts
Preceded by Ewen Fergusson	Principal Private Secretary to the Foreign Secretary; 1978–1981	Succeeded by Brian Fall
Parliament of the United Kingdom
Preceded by Bill Benyon	Member of Parliament for Buckingham; 1983–1997	Succeeded by John Bercow
