= Kimbolton Fireworks =

Manufacturer of display fireworks in the UK

- Founded: 1964
- Headquarters: Kimbolton, Cambridgeshire, England
- Products: Fireworks

Kimbolton Fireworks was a British manufacturer of display fireworks. It sold fireworks to shops, operated a mail order firework business, and offered a firework display service. It was the last remaining manufacturer of fireworks in the UK.

Based in Kimbolton, Cambridgeshire, the company was founded in 1964 by the Reverend Ron Lancaster, Kimbolton School chaplain and chemistry master. His son, Mark Lancaster was a director before becoming a Member of Parliament.

The public displays put on by Kimbolton Fireworks included the 25th anniversary of the Queen's coronation in 1978, the 50th anniversary of VJ Day in 1995, and the Hong Kong handover in 1997.

On 19 February 2019 it was announced that Kimbolton Fireworks would cease trading.

The trading rights were bought by Phoenix Fireworks (Wrotham, Kent) in 2019 and they continue to sell the Kimbolton brand across the UK.

On 8 February 2022 the trading rights of the retail brand of fireworks known as Kimbolton Fireworks Retail was sold by Phoenix Fireworks to Celtic Fireworks (based in Tutbury, Staffordshire). Phoenix Fireworks continue to use Kimbolton Fireworks as a trading name for some of their firework displays and professional trade sales.
