= Mark Lancaster, Baron Lancaster of Kimbolton =

British Conservative politician (born 1970)

Major General The Right Honourable The Lord Lancaster of Kimbolton TD VR PC
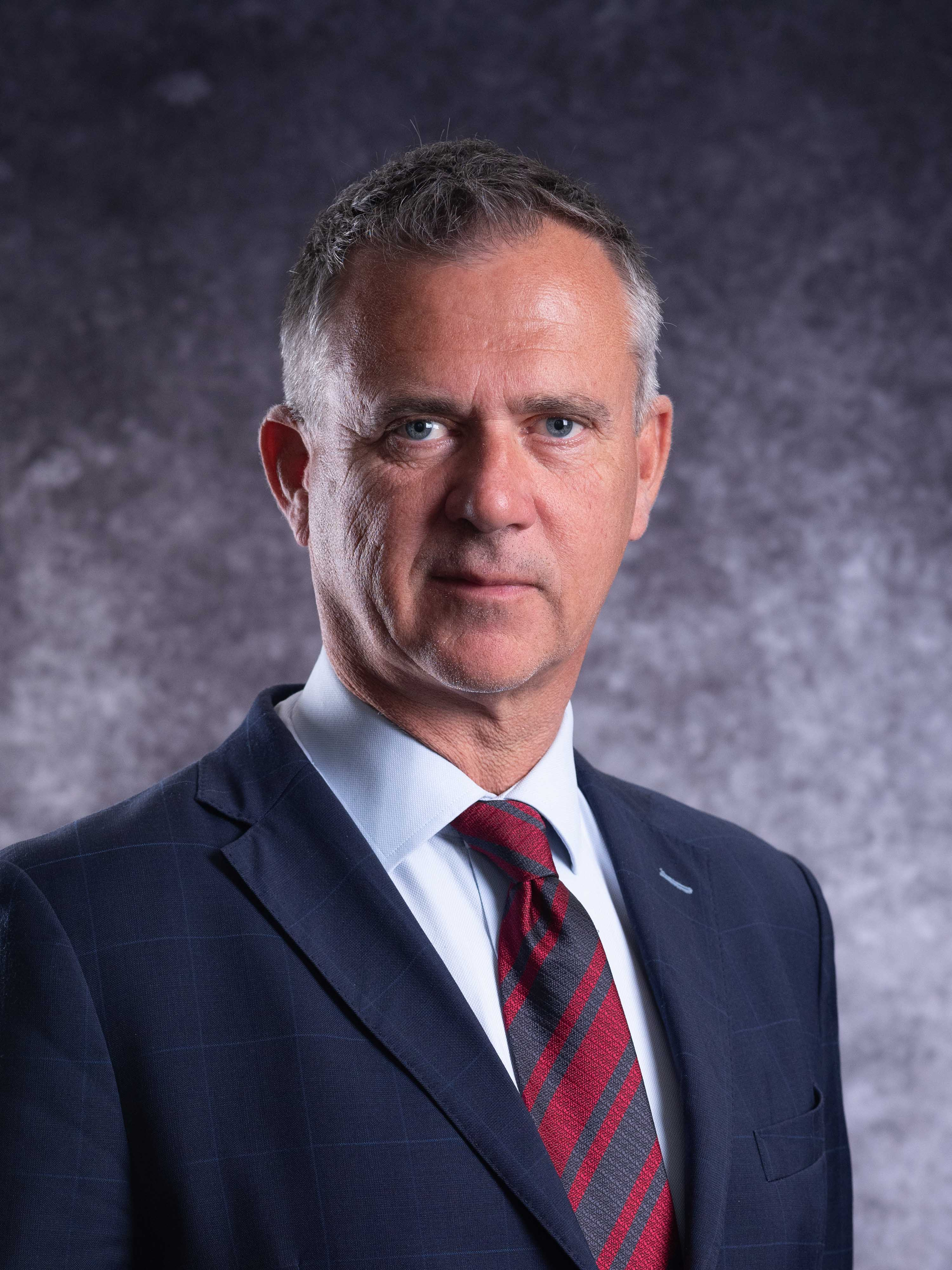
- Official portrait, 2023

Minister of State for the Armed Forces
- In office 13 June 2017 – 16 December 2019
- Prime Minister: Theresa May; Boris Johnson
- Preceded by: Michael Penning
- Succeeded by: Anne-Marie Trevelyan

Parliamentary Under-Secretary of State for Defence Veterans, Reserves and Personnel
- In office 12 May 2015 – 13 June 2017
- Prime Minister: David Cameron; Theresa May
- Preceded by: Anna Soubry
- Succeeded by: Tobias Ellwood

Lord Commissioner of the Treasury
- In office 9 September 2012 – 12 May 2015
- Prime Minister: David Cameron
- Preceded by: Jeremy Wright
- Succeeded by: Charles Elphicke

Member of the House of Lords
- Lord Temporal
- Life peerage 16 September 2020

Member of Parliament for Milton Keynes North North East Milton Keynes (2005–2010)
- In office 5 May 2005 – 6 November 2019
- Preceded by: Brian White
- Succeeded by: Ben Everitt

Personal details
- Born: John Mark Lancaster; 12 May 1970 (age 56) Cambridge, England
- Party: Non-affiliated
- Spouses: Katherine Reader (m. 1995; div. 2007) Caroline Dinenage (m. 2014)
- Children: 2
- Education: University of Buckingham (BSc); University of Exeter (MBA)
- Website: lancaster4mk.com

Military service
- Allegiance: United Kingdom
- Branch/service: British Army
- Years of service: 1988–present
- Rank: Major General
- Unit: General Staff, Late Royal Engineers
- Commands: British Army Reserve; 217 (London) Field Squadron (EOD)
- Battles/wars: War in Afghanistan; Kosovo; Bosnia
- Awards: Efficiency Decoration; Volunteer Reserves Service Medal

Major General John Mark Lancaster, Baron Lancaster of Kimbolton, TD, VR, PC (born 12 May 1970) is a British politician, a Member of the House of Lords and a British Army reserve officer, who has served as Assistant Chief of Defence Staff (Reserves) since June 2026.

He previously served as Member of Parliament for North East Milton Keynes from 2005 until 2010, and then its successor seat Milton Keynes North from the seat's creation at the 2010 general election until his retirement from the House of Commons at the 2019 general election. He served as a Minister in several appointments after the formation of the Coalition Government in 2010, first as Lord Commissioner of Her Majesty's Treasury, before in May 2015 moving to the Ministry of Defence, first as the Parliamentary Under Secretary of State for Veterans, Reserves and Personnel, and then, from 13 June 2017, as Minister of State for the Armed Forces. He served in this role until his retirement from Government on 16 December 2019. He was granted a life peerage in the 2019 Dissolution Honours, and was created "Baron Lancaster of Kimbolton" on 16 September 2020. He was introduced to the House of Lords on 12 October 2020.

== Early life ==
Lancaster was born on 12 May 1970 in Cambridge. He was privately educated at Kimbolton School in Huntingdonshire where his father Ronald Lancaster was chaplain from 1963 to 1988. He graduated as a BSc in Business Studies from the University of Buckingham in 1992 and MBA from the University of Exeter Business School in 1993.

He was a company director for the family firm Kimbolton Fireworks before he was elected to Parliament.

== Political career ==
Lancaster served on Huntingdonshire District Council between 1995 and 1999.

Lancaster stood unsuccessfully as the Conservative candidate for Nuneaton at the 2001 general election. He was defeated by the Labour incumbent Bill Olner.

=== House of Commons ===
Lancaster was elected as Member of Parliament gaining North East Milton Keynes for the Conservatives in the 2005 general election, and succeeding Brian White of the Labour Party.

Between 2005 and 2010 he served in Opposition, first as an Opposition Whip in 2006–2007, before moving to be the Shadow Minister for International Development in 2007 until the 2010 General Election.

During his time as a backbench MP, He served on the Office of Deputy Prime Minister Select Committee, (2005), Defence Select Committee (2006), Housing, Communities and Local Government Committee (2008–09) and the International Development Select Committee (2009–10).

After his re-election in 2010 and the formation of the Coalition Government, he was initially appointed as the PPS to the Secretary of State for International Development, From 2012 to 2015, he was a government whip and a Lord Commissioner of the Treasury. He then moved to the Ministry of Defence where he was Parliamentary Under-Secretary of State for Defence Veterans, Reserves and Personnel (2015–2017) and Minister for the Armed Forces (2017–2019).

In November 2019, he announced his retirement from the House of Commons.

=== House of Lords ===
Lancaster was nominated for a peerage in the 2019 Dissolution Honours. On 16 September 2020, he was created Baron Lancaster of Kimbolton by Queen Elizabeth II. He was Introduced to the House of Lords on 12 October 2020, and sits in the House as a Conservative Party life peer. He made his maiden speech on 27 October 2020, while expressing regret that as a bomb disposal expert and with his family ties to fireworks-making, that it didn't occur on 5 November.

He was appointed as a member of the NATO Parliamentary Assembly on 9 November 2021. He was elected Chair of the Defence and Security Committee of the NATO Parliamentary Assembly at the 70th Annual Session held in Montreal 22–25 November 2024.

Lancaster was appointed as the Government's Defence Security Advocate on 25 January 2023. The role was established to help drive UK Defence exports and involves engagement with both UK Industry leaders and foreign Government Ministers. He was reappointed in the role by the incoming Labour Government on 9 January 2025.

=== Political views ===
Lancaster has stated his disagreement with the UK Government's policy on the 2003 invasion of Iraq. In an interview with the BBC, he stated "It may well be much harder to get the British public to back other overseas adventures by the military because of what's happened in Iraq". Lancaster voted against legislation allowing gay couples to marry at the Bill's second reading, but supported minor 'tidying up' legislation supporting the principle once the main Bill had passed through the House of Commons.

== Military career ==
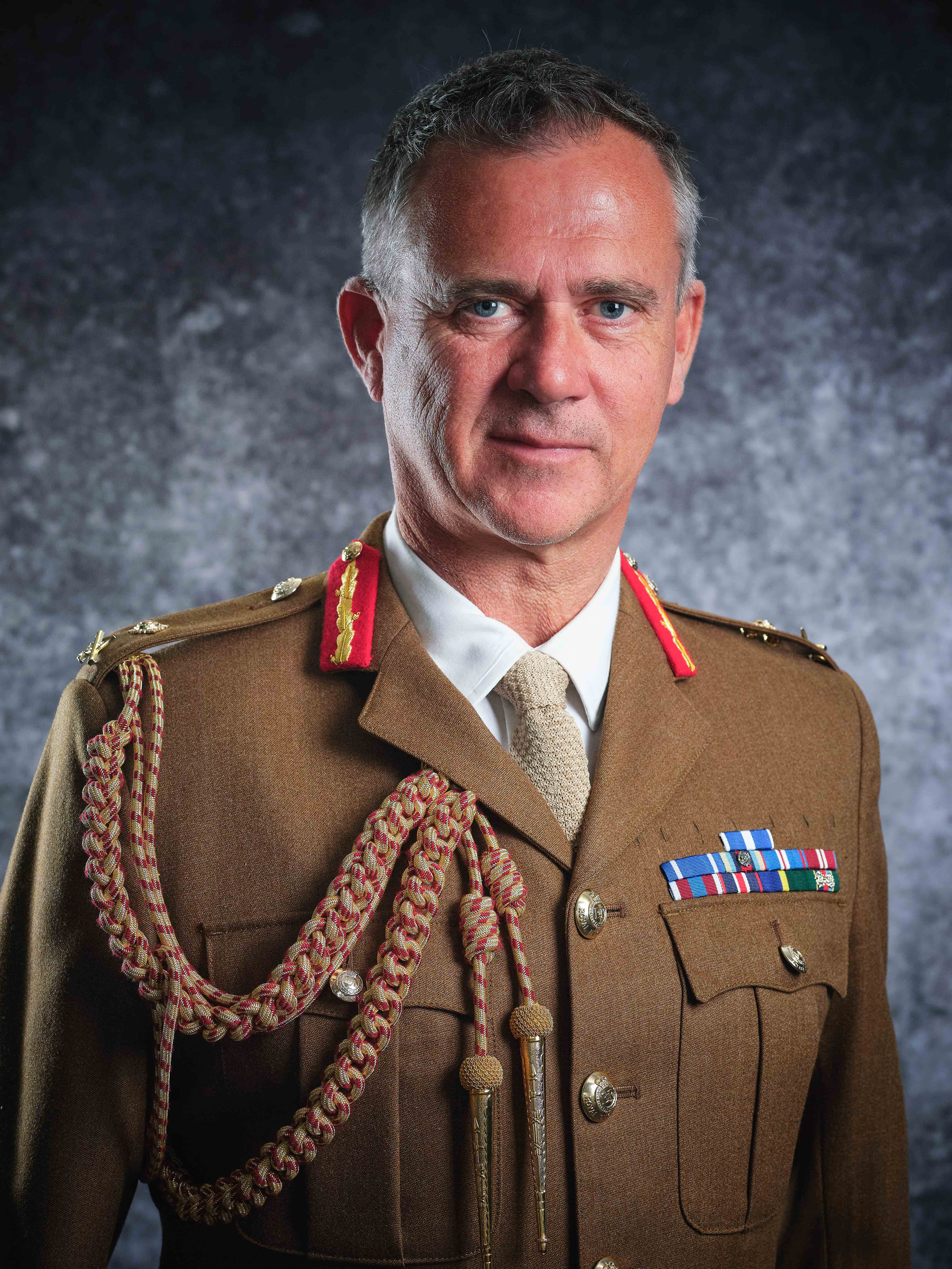
Maj Gen Mark Lancaster TD PC

Lancaster was commissioned a second lieutenant in the Corps of Royal Engineers on 4 December 1988, holding a Short-Service Limited Commission (SSLC). Between 1988 and 1990 Lancaster served in the British Army on an extended SSLC in Hong Kong with the Queen's Gurkha Engineers before going to university. On 1 March 1990, he transferred his commission to the Army Reserve serving with 216 Field Sqn (ADR) RE based at RAF Marham. He was promoted lieutenant on 1 July 1991. He was promoted captain on 1 June 1997 (seniority from 16 October 1995), serving as a training Officer at Cambridge University Officer Training Corps and subsequently at 2IC of 221 Fd Sq (EOD) RE based at Rochester. He was promoted to major on 13 May 2004 (seniority from 1 March 2002). and commanded 217 Field Sqn (EOD) RE based at Holloway in London, an Explosive Ordnance Disposal unit.

Lancaster was promoted to lieutenant-colonel on 1 February 2012 and to colonel on 22 June 2017. at which point he joined the General Staff Corps (late Royal Engineers) and became Deputy Commander of 77th Brigade from 2018 to July 2020.

He was promoted to brigadier on 1 August 2020. serving as Deputy Director Joint Warfare at UK's Strategic Command until August 2023. He assumed the post of Director Reserves (Army) on 3 October 2023 in the rank of Major General.

He took up the post of Assistant Chief of Defence Staff (Reserves and Cadets), the senior reservist in defence, in June 2026.

=== Operational service ===
Lancaster has been on active service three times, in Kosovo (1999–2000), Bosnia (2001–2002) and Afghanistan (2006).

=== Honorary appointments ===
He was appointed as the Deputy Colonel Commandant Brigade of Gurkhas on 1 September 2019, and Honorary Colonel of the Cayman Islands Regiment on 2 July 2021. He was appointed a Colonel Commandant of the Royal Engineers on 1 October 2023.

=== Long service awards ===
He received the Territorial Decoration (TD) in 2002 and the Volunteer Reserves Service Medal (VR) in 2011. He was awarded a bar to the latter medal for a further five years service in 2016, a second bar in 2021 and a third bar in 2026.

== Personal life ==
Lancaster lives in Gosport with his wife, Conservative MP for Gosport, Caroline Dinenage. He previously married Katherine Reader 1995 before separating in 2006 and divorcing in 2009. He briefly partnered Amanda Evans with whom he has a daughter. In February 2014, he married Caroline Dinenage, who had also been previously married. Lancaster is a supporter of MK Dons, and enjoys playing cricket, which includes the House of Commons team.

He was awarded an honorary doctorate from the University of Buckingham in 2008.

== Honours ==
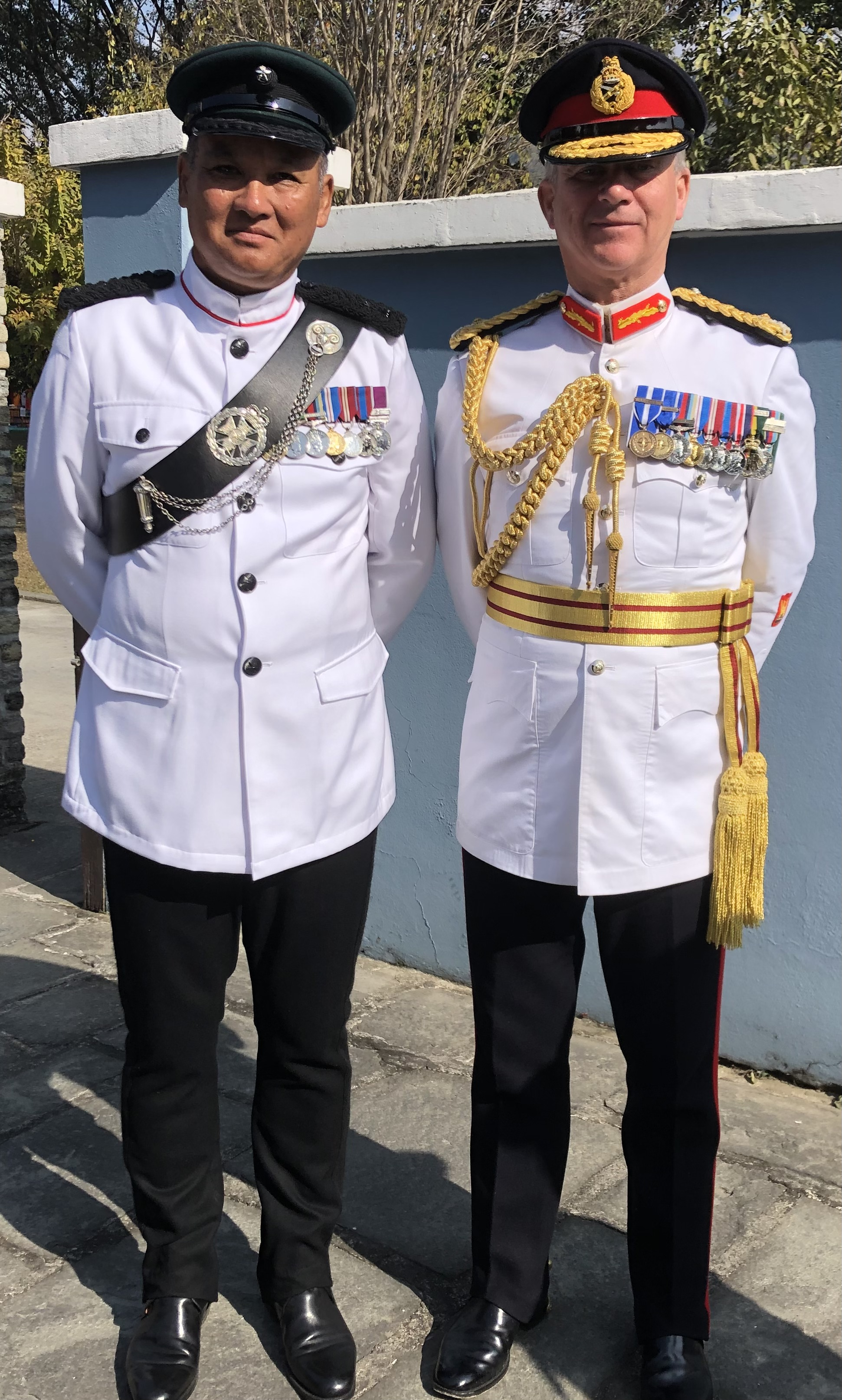
Maj Gen Lord Lancaster (right) as Deputy Col Commandant, Brigade of Gurkhas, Nepal 2024

Ribbon	Description	Notes
	NATO Medal for Kosovo	2000
	NATO Former Republic of Yugoslavia Medal	2002; With clasp 'Former Yugoslavia'
	OSM for Afghanistan	2006; With "Afghanistan" clasp
	Queen Elizabeth II Golden Jubilee Medal	2002
	Queen Elizabeth II Diamond Jubilee Medal	2012
	Queen Elizabeth II Platinum Jubilee Medal	2022
	King Charles III Coronation Medal	2023
	Efficiency Decoration (TD)	2002; 12 years' commissioned service in the Territorial Army
	Volunteer Reserves Service Medal	2011 10 years' service in the Army Reserves; 2016 bar for 5 years' further service; 2021 2nd bar for 5 years' further service; 2026 3rd bar for 5 years' further service

Parliament of the United Kingdom
Preceded by Brian White	Member of Parliament for North East Milton Keynes; 2005–2010	Constituency replaced by Milton Keynes North
Constituency created from North East Milton Keynes	Member of Parliament for Milton Keynes North; 2010–2019	Succeeded by Ben Everitt
Political offices
Preceded by Mike Penning	Minister of State for the Armed Forces; 2017–2019	Succeeded by Anne-Marie Trevelyan
Orders of precedence in the United Kingdom
Preceded by The Lord Sharpe of Epsom	Gentlemen; Baron Lancaster of Kimbolton	Followed by The Lord Mendoza
