= Englefield House =

Country house in Berkshire, England

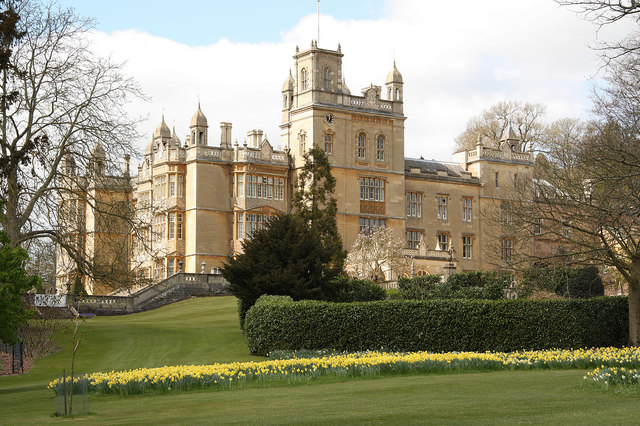
- Englefield House in 2010

- Location within Berkshire

General information
- Type: Country house
- Architectural style: Elizabethan
- Location: Englefield, Berkshire, England
- Coordinates: 51.4430°N 1.1060°W
- Construction started: 1558
- Owner: Richard, Baron Benyon

Technical details
- Floor count: 3
- Floor area: 699.24

Website
- www.englefieldestate.co.uk

Listed Building – Grade II*
- Official name: Englefield House and entrance courtyard adjoining to northeast
- Designated: 19 June 1984
- Reference no.: 1289194

Listed Building – Grade II
- Official name: Nos. 1 and 2 Englefield Lodges, gateway, gates and flanking walls
- Designated: 19 June 1984
- Reference no.: 1213401

Listed Building – Grade II
- Official name: Terrace walls approximately 30 metres to south east of Englefield House
- Designated: 19 June 1984
- Reference no.: 1213167

National Register of Historic Parks and Gardens
- Official name: Englefield House
- Designated: 30 September 1987
- Reference no.: 1000583

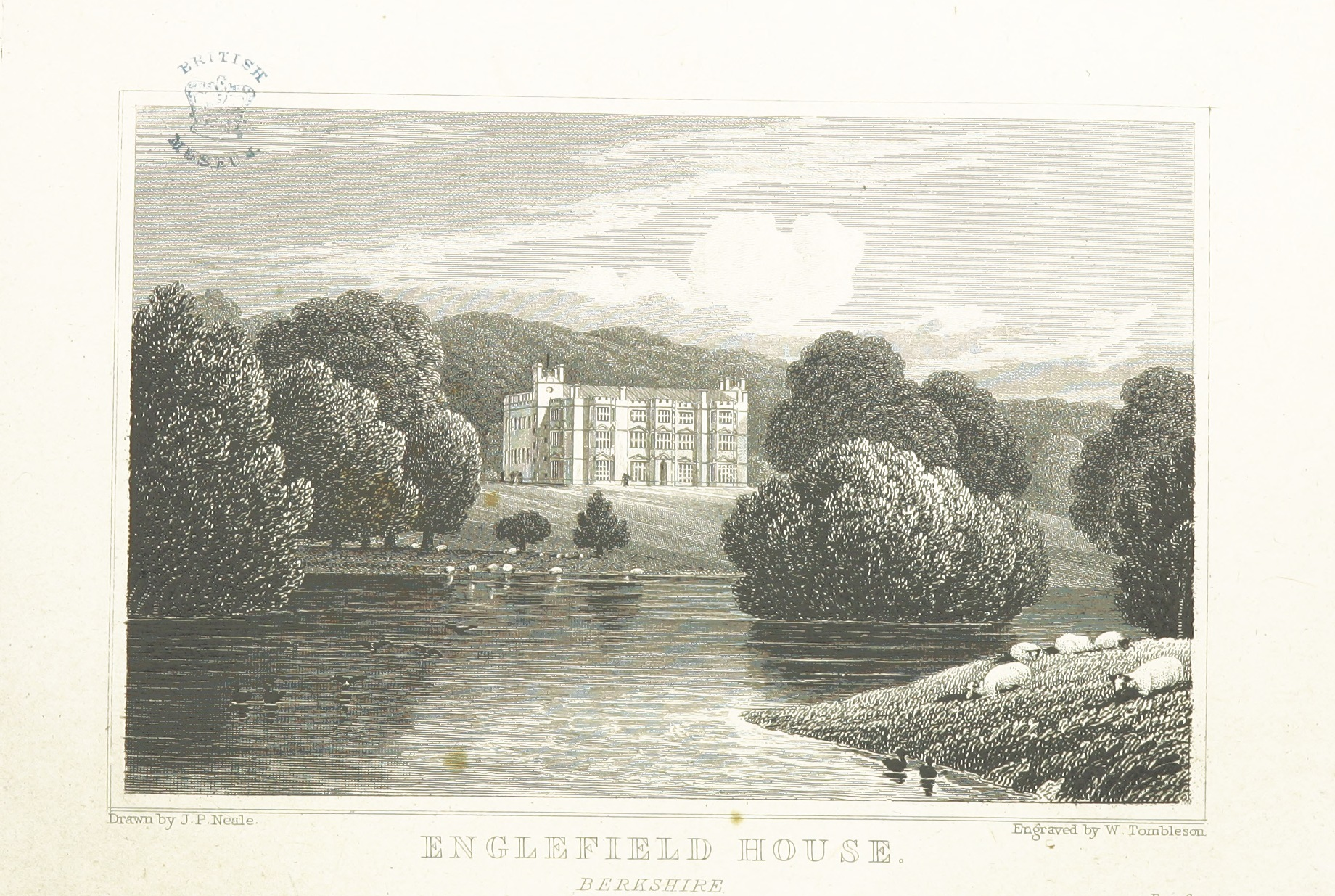
Drawing of Englefield House, in Views of the Seats of Noblemen and Gentlemen in England, Wales, Scotland and Ireland by John Preston Neale (1824)

Englefield House is an Elizabethan country house with surrounding estate at Englefield in the English county of Berkshire. The gardens are open to the public all year round on particular weekdays and the house by appointment only for large groups.

Englefield House and its adjoining entrance courtyard are Grade II* listed on the National Heritage List for England, and the formal gardens and parkland are listed at Grade II on the Register of Historic Parks and Gardens. The lodges, gateway, gates and flanking walls are also listed as a group at Grade II, as are the terrace walls to the south-east of the main house.

== History ==
The present house was erected before 1558. There were substantial alterations by Thomas Hopper in the 1820s.

Englefield House was the home of the Englefield family, supposedly from the time of King Edgar. Sir Thomas Englefield was the Speaker of the House of Commons. In 1559 the house was confiscated from Thomas Englefield's grandson, Sir Francis Englefield, a servant of the Catholic Queen Mary, for "consorting with [the] enemies" of the new Protestant monarch, Elizabeth I.

Popular local tradition is that the Queen granted Englefield to her spymaster, Sir Francis Walsingham, although there is no evidence of this. After a succession of short-lived residents, the estate was eventually purchased by John Paulet, 5th Marquess of Winchester, famous for his Civil War defence of Basing House in Hampshire. He retired to Englefield at the Restoration and is buried in the parish church. From his Paulet descendants, the house passed, through marriage, to the Benyon family.

Numerous members of the Benyon family have also been members of parliament. Recent descent has been: Lord Francis Paulet (d. 1696); Francis Paulet (d. 1712); Anne Paulet (d. 1729); Powlett Wright the elder (d. 1741); Powlett Wrighte the younger (d. 1779); Nathan Wrighte (d. 1789) (descendants of Sir Nathan Wright(e) (1654–1721), Lord Keeper of the Great Seal); Richard Benyon the younger (d. 1796); Richard Benyon De Beauvoir (d. 1854); Richard Fellowes Benyon (d. 1897); James Herbert Benyon (d. 1935); Sir Henry Benyon, Bt. (d. 1959); Vice-Admiral Richard Benyon (d. 1967) and Sir William Richard Benyon (d. 2014).

Englefield House by John Constable, 1832

In 1781 the estate was short of money and Nathaniel Wrighte decided to let the house. The rent was set for 400 guineas p.a. but he eventually let Englefield to Lady Margaret Clive for 300 as he was keen to find the right tenant who would not interfere with the house’s character too much. The house was rented complete with a library of thousands of pounds' worth of books.

On 20 May 2017, the sister of Catherine, Princess of Wales (then-Duchess of Cambridge), Pippa Middleton, married financier James Matthews at St Mark's Church on the Englefield Estate. A reception was held at Englefield House shortly after the service. Guests included the then-Duke (now William, Prince of Wales) and Duchess of Cambridge and their children, Prince George and Princess Charlotte.

=== Family name changes ===
- Richard Benyon to Richard Powlett-Wrighte in 1814 (and then to Richard Benyon De Beauvoir in 1822);
- Richard Fellowes to Richard Fellowes Benyon in 1854;
- James Herbert Fellowes, to James Herbert Benyon in 1897;
- Richard Shelley, William Richard Shelley and Richard Henry Ronald Shelley to ... Benyon in 1964 and 1967.

== Film and television ==
Englefield House has been the filming location for a number of films, including X-Men: First Class, Match Point, The King's Speech, Great Expectations, Easy Virtue The Go-Between, and The Thursday Murder Club, as well as for television series such as Black Mirror, (episode "Playtest"), Jeeves and Wooster , (episode "Jeeves' Arrival"),Agatha Christie's Marple, Agatha Christie's Poirot episode "Taken at the Flood", Hex and the reality television series I Wanna Marry "Harry". It was also used as Auradon Prep in the Disney TV films Descendants, Descendants 2, Descendants 3 and Descendants: The Rise of Red, and in 2022 parts of the house were used as Sandringham House in The Crown. It was also used as the house of Baroness Von Hellman in Cruella, as well as "The Magician's Nephew" episode of Midsomer Murders. The grounds were also used in The Acolyte.

== Estate ==
The Englefield Estate covers some 20,000 acres (8,100 ha) and includes most of the parish. It is owned by Richard, Baron Benyon, a former MP sitting for the Conservative party in the House of Lords.

The estate has a 700-metre (2,300 ft) grass airstrip.

== See also ==
- Grade II* listed buildings in Berkshire
