= Englefield House (painting) =

Painting by John Constable

- Artist: John Constable
- Year: 1832
- Type: Oil on canvas, landscape painting
- Location: Englefield House; Berkshire

Englefield House is an 1832 landscape painting by the British artist John Constable. It depicts a view of Englefield House in Berkshire with deer running in the foreground. Constable was commissioned by Richard Benyon the owner of Englefield. The house had previously featured in a painting by Nathaniel Dance-Holland.

It was one of four oil paintings that Constable submitted to the Royal Academy Exhibition of 1833 at Somerset House along with The Cottage in a Cornfield. The Irish portraitist Martin Archer Shee, the President of the Royal Academy, was dismissive of the work which he felt was "only a picture of a house". Constable replied it "was a picture of a summer morning, including a house". Constable also produced a watercolour painting of the house, which is now in the Victoria and Albert Museum in London.

== See also ==
- List of paintings by John Constable

== Bibliography ==
- Clarkson, Jonathan & Cox, Neil. Constable & Wivenhoe Park: Reality & Vision. University of Essex, 2000.
- Pevsner, Nikolaus. Berkshire. Yale University Press, 1966.
- Reynolds, Graham. Constable's England. Metropolitan Museum of Art, 1983.
