= North East Milton Keynes =

UK Parliament constituency (1992–2010)

Coordinates: 52.056°N 0.648°W

- Former county constituency for the House of Commons
- Boundary of North East Milton Keynes in Buckinghamshire for the 2005 general election

- Location of Buckinghamshire within England
- County: Buckinghamshire

1992–2010
- Seats: One
- Created from: Milton Keynes
- Replaced by: Milton Keynes North, Milton Keynes South

North East Milton Keynes was a county constituency represented in the House of Commons of the Parliament of the United Kingdom from 1992 to 2010. It elected one member of parliament (MP) by the first past the post system of election.

== History ==
Construction of Milton Keynes began in 1967, as a new town. Until 1983, it was part of the Buckingham constituency. As its population grew, Milton Keynes then gained its own constituency, which was taken by William Benyon of the Conservative Party.

Uniquely outside the normal cycle of periodic reviews by the Boundary Commission, the continuing expansion in the population of Milton Keynes led to this constituency being divided in two for the 1992 general election (Milton Keynes South West and North East Milton Keynes).

The new North East constituency was taken by Peter Butler of the Conservatives, who lost it to Labour's Brian White at the 1997 election. White held the seat until 2005, when it was regained by the Conservatives' Mark Lancaster.

== Boundaries ==
The constituency was one of two covering the Borough of Milton Keynes. It covered the remaining parts of the 1967 designated area of Milton Keynes not in the Milton Keynes South West constituency, as well as the older settlement of Newport Pagnell and the more rural parts of the borough, around Hanslope and Olney.

The constituency consisted of 10 electoral wards of the Borough of Milton Keynes: Bradwell, Danesborough, Lavendon, Linford, Newport Pagnell, Olney, Pineham, Sherington, Stantonbury, and Woburn Sands.

=== Boundary review ===
Following the Fifth periodic review of Westminster constituencies into parliamentary representation in Buckinghamshire, the Boundary Commission for England recommended changes to the existing Milton Keynes constituencies. Beginning with the 2010 general election, there would continue to be two parliamentary constituencies for Milton Keynes, but they would be formed on a different basis, abolishing the Milton Keynes North East and Milton Keynes South West constituencies after four general elections of use.

Milton Keynes North was formed from the Borough Council electoral wards of Bradwell, Campbell Park, Hanslope Park, Linford North, Linford South, Middleton, Newport Pagnell North, Newport Pagnell South, Olney, Sherington, Stantonbury and Wolverton.

Milton Keynes South was formed from the electoral wards of Bletchley and Fenny Stratford, Danesborough, Denbigh, Eaton Manor, Emerson Valley, Furzton, Loughton Park, Stony Stratford, Walton Park, Whaddon, and Woughton.

== Members of Parliament ==
Election	Member	Party
1992	Peter Butler	Conservative
1997	Brian White	Labour
2005	Mark Lancaster	Conservative
2010	Constituency abolished: see Milton Keynes North and Milton Keynes South	

== Elections ==
=== Elections in the 2000s ===
General election 2005: North East Milton Keynes
Party	Candidate	Votes	%	±%
Conservative	Mark Lancaster	19,674	39.3	+1.2
Labour	Brian White	18,009	35.9	−6.1
Liberal Democrats	Jane Carr	9,789	19.5	+1.7
UKIP	Mike Phillips	1,400	2.8	+0.6
Green	Peter Richardson	1,090	2.2	New
Independent	Anant Vyas	142	0.3	New
Majority		1,665	3.4	N/A
Turnout		50,104	63.6	−1.0
Conservative gain from Labour		Swing	+3.6	

General election 2001: North East Milton Keynes
Party	Candidate	Votes	%	±%
Labour	Brian White	19,761	42.0	+2.6
Conservative	Marion Rix	17,932	38.1	−0.9
Liberal Democrats	David Yeoward	8,375	17.8	+0.4
UKIP	Michael Phillips	1,026	2.2	New
Majority		1,829	3.9	+3.4
Turnout		47,094	64.6	−8.2
Labour hold		Swing	+1.7	

=== Elections in the 1990s ===
General election 1997: North East Milton Keynes
Party	Candidate	Votes	%	±%
Labour	Brian White	20,201	39.43	+15.7
Conservative	Peter Butler	19,961	38.96	−12.6
Liberal Democrats	Graham Mabbutt	8,907	17.38	−5.6
Referendum	Michael Phillips	1,492	2.91	New
Green	Alan Francis	576	1.12	+1.1
Natural Law	Martin Simson	99	0.19	0.0
Majority		240	0.47	N/A
Turnout		51,236	72.78	−8.2
Labour gain from Conservative		Swing	+14.2	

General election 1992: North East Milton Keynes
Party	Candidate	Votes	%	±%
Conservative	Peter Butler	26,212	51.6	
Labour	Maggie Cosin	12,036	23.7	
Liberal Democrats	Peter Gaskell	11,693	23.0	
Green	Alan Francis	529	1.0	
Ind. Conservative	M. Kavanagh-Dowsett	249	0.5	
Natural Law	Martin Simson	79	0.2	
Majority		14,176	27.9	
Turnout		50,798	81.0	
Conservative win (new seat)				

== See also ==
- List of parliamentary constituencies in Buckinghamshire

== Sources ==
- Election result, 2005 (BBC)
- Election results, 1997 – 2001 (BBC)
- Election results, 1997 – 2001 (Election Demon)
- Election results, 1992 (Election Demon)
- Election results, 1992 – 2005 (Guardian)
