= Mydentist =

British dental company

mydentist
- Type: Private
- Headquarters: Kearsley, United Kingdom
- Area served: UK
- Key people: Tom Riall (executive chairman), Nilesh Pandya (chief executive officer), Richard Storah (chief financial officer), Will Smith (chief operating officer), Libby Jones (chief people officer), Tom Muir (Chief Customer Officer), Dr Nyree Whitley (chief clinical officer), Stephen Roseby (Chief of Staff and General Counsel)
- Owner: Bridgepoint
- Website: www.mydentist.co.uk

mydentist is the largest dental provider in the UK, with around 600 practices. mydentist is a trading style of IDH Group Limited, based in Kearsley. Nilesh Pandya is the Chief Executive of mydentist.

mydentist treats a mixture of private and NHS patients. In 2018, it treated more than four million people. In 2022 this increased to over five Million people.

== History ==
It runs an annual clinical conference, which in 2018 was attended by more than 600 dentists and dental professionals. In 2022, the company announced the clinical conference coming back after a break during covid

In January 2019 Matt Hancock visited its surgery in Mildenhall and said: “Companies like MyDentist play a really important role in delivering a good service to keep our nation’s teeth strong.” Hancock was criticised because the firm charges higher than average fees for private dentures. Its private dentures cost £878 compared to £256.50 on the NHS. Jon Ashworth said: “Surely the priority should be expanding access to NHS dentistry for everyone, not endorsing private for the better off.” Tom Riall said the firm was developing "an affordable range of private dentistry because so many practices are closed to NHS patients.” Healthwatch Suffolk and the British Dental Association both pointed out that patients on low incomes rely on NHS dentistry but in the area of Bury St Edmunds the nearest surgery taking adult NHS patients was ten miles away and what was on offer from the company was not affordable for them.

The company was acquired by Palamon Capital Partners from The Carlyle Group in May 2021. In 2022, IDH Group sold DD (Previously known as Dental Directory) to Sun European Partners.

In February 2021, mydentist invested £1.2 million in a new practice in Railway Road, Blackburn merging together 3 previous practices into 1. This meant that practices at Preston New Road, Blackburn and Langham Road, Blackburn closed.

In February 2022, mydentist expanded its Coalville practice into a new premises in a £700,000 investment.

In June 2022, mydentist opened a new orthodontic practice in Grimsby in a £400,000 investment.

In September 2023 mydentist relocated a practice in Lancaster in a £2.1m investment.

In 2025 mydentist was acquired by Bridgepoint

== See also ==
- Private healthcare in the United Kingdom
