= Barry Legg =

British politician

Member of Parliament for Milton Keynes South West
- In office 9 April 1992 – 8 April 1997
- Preceded by: New constituency
- Succeeded by: Phyllis Starkey

Westminster City Councillor for Regent's Park
- In office 1978–1991
- Preceded by: David Avery
- Succeeded by: William Wells

Personal details
- Born: 30 May 1949 (age 77)
- Party: Conservative
- Education: University of Manchester
- Profession: Chartered Accountant

Barry Charles Legg (born 30 May 1949) is a British politician. A former Conservative Member of Parliament (MP) for Milton Keynes South West from 1992 until the 1997 general election, he was defeated by Labour's Phyllis Starkey. Legg is the chairman of the Eurosceptic Bruges Group.

== Directorship ==
Prior to becoming an MP Legg was a director of Hillsdown Holdings, one of Britain's biggest food groups at that time and owner of leading brands such as Typhoo tea, Hartley's jam and Buxted chickens, having joined the firm in 1978. He became company secretary in 1982 and a director in 1986. He left Hillsdown "by mutual consent" in September 1992 with a 'golden handshake' of £200,000 "after it was decided to replace him with someone who could devote their full energies to the job."

== Career in local government ==
Legg – an accountant and tax specialist – entered politics in 1978 as a Conservative councillor for the Regent's Park ward on Westminster City Council. He became the Conservative Chief Whip on the council during Dame Shirley Porter's leadership. He was later linked with the 'homes for votes scandal' in which council homes in eight key marginal wards were sold instead of being re-let to council tenants or used to alleviate homelessness. Believing that council tenants were more likely to vote Labour, the Conservative council intended that this strategy would result in "a pattern of tenure which is more likely to translate into Conservative votes."

A second independent inquiry identified Legg as the chairman of a secret Westminster council committee meeting that took the decision in 1989 to place 100 homeless families, including 150 children, in two dilapidated tower blocks already known to be full of asbestos. A report from 1983 had warned: "It is considered that these two tower blocks... may provide the greatest potential for asbestos release within residential accommodation in Britain." The official inquiry found that it was "abundantly clear" that the committee knew that the tower blocks, Chantry Point and Hermes Point in Paddington, had asbestos problems and were in a terrible condition. The District Auditor also found that the decision, "leaving aside the serious ethical concerns that it raised, was unlawful because it was taken by a secret and unaccountable group." The scandal was the subject of an exposé by social affairs programme Public Eye, broadcast on 30 November 1995 on BBC Two.

Legg's time as a councillor and his conduct in public life and business were the subject of a joint investigation by The Guardian newspaper and the BBC Radio 4 Today programme in May 2003.

== Career in Parliament ==
After being defeated by Labour's Derek Foster at Bishop Auckland in 1983, Legg gained election for Milton Keynes South West at the 1992 General Election. He was unseated at the 1997 General Election.

Described as an 'unreconstructed' Thatcherite, Legg is a co-founder of the Conservative Way Forward campaigning group and was a member of the No Turning Back Group (NTBG) and one of the Maastricht Rebels.

=== Tax reform ===
In 1992 Legg co-authored Maintaining Momentum: a Radical Tax Agenda for the 1990s which proposed a reduction in the basic rate of income tax to 20%, the abolition of Inheritance Tax and temporarily raising the threshold for higher rate income tax to £100,000, followed by its abolition.

=== Welfare reform ===
In 1993 Legg was the co-author, with Iain Duncan Smith and 3 other members of the NTBG, of a report which proposed cutting £8 billion from the social security budget. The report made a number of recommendations:

- Merging all means-tested and other non-contributory benefits into a single benefit called "whole person benefit" (WPB)
- Privatisation of the National Insurance "pay-as-you-go" benefit system and introduction of private pensions and private insurance against unemployment, long-term sickness and invalidity
- Abolition of child benefit
- Introduction of smart card technology to reduce fraud
- Equalisation of retirement ages for men and women at 67
- Abolition of the State Earnings-Related Pension Scheme
- Cutting the entitlement to unemployment benefit from 12 months to 6 months
- Abolition of mortgage tax relief, rent rebates and housing benefits.

== Chief Executive of the Conservative Party ==
On 14 February 2003 Legg was controversially appointed by Iain Duncan Smith to be the new Conservative Party Chief Executive – "against the wishes of the party's ruling board" – and Chief of Staff of Duncan Smith's private office. The appointment was vetoed by the board and Legg, described as Duncan Smith's "right wing ally unpopular with many MPs", resigned on 7 May 2003 with a six-figure severance package. Conservative Party peer Lord Spicer later reported that Duncan Smith was "almost in tears" and threatened to resign if the Conservative Party board would not let him keep Legg.

== Works ==
- Legg, Barry; Gibb, Nick (1992). Maintaining Momentum: A radical tax agenda for the 1990s. London: Conservative Way Forward.
- Duncan, Alan; Duncan-Smith, Iain; Jenkin, Bernard; Legg, Barry; Whittingdale, John (1993). Who Benefits? Reinventing Social Security. London: Conservative Political Centre. ISBN 9780850708561.

Parliament of the United Kingdom
New constituency	Member of Parliament for Milton Keynes South West; 1992–1997	Succeeded by Phyllis Starkey
