= Henry Benyon =

British baronet (1884–1959)

Sir Henry Arthur Benyon, 1st Baronet
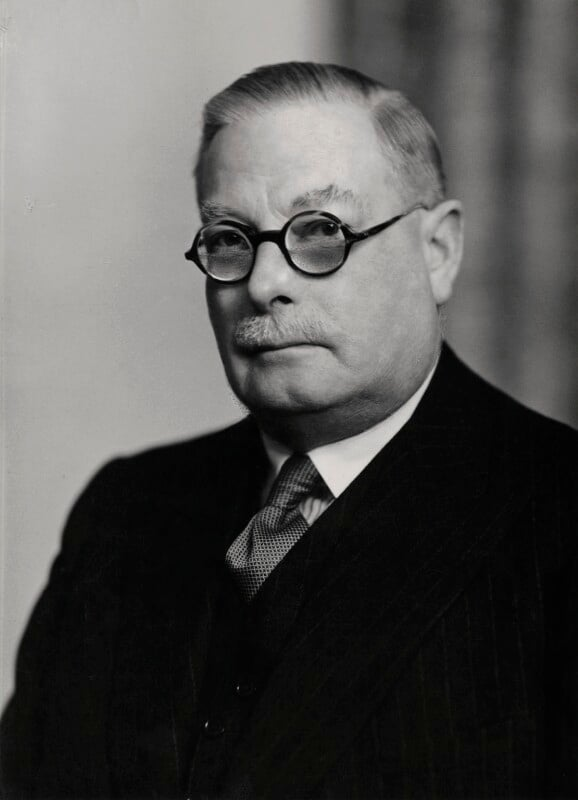
- Henry Benyon in 1954

Lord Lieutenant of Berkshire
- In office 28 March 1945 – 15 June 1959
- Preceded by: Sir Henry Wilder
- Succeeded by: The Lord Astor of Hever

High Sheriff of Berkshire
- In office 1925–1925

Personal details
- Born: Henry Arthur Fellowes; 9 December 1884 Chelsea, London, England
- Died: 15 June 1959 (aged 74)
- Spouse: Violet Eveline Peek
- Parent(s): James Herbert Fellowes; Dame Edith Benyon
- Education: Eton College
- Alma mater: Trinity Hall, Cambridge
- Occupation: Landowner, politician
- Awards: Baronet

Military service
- Service: Berkshire Yeomanry
- Rank: Captain
- Battles/wars: World War I (Egypt)

Sir Henry Arthur Benyon, 1st Baronet JP (né Fellowes; 9 December 1884 – 15 June 1959) was the immediate post-War Lord Lieutenant of Berkshire.

Born Henry Arthur Fellowes in Chelsea, London, the son of James Herbert Fellowes and his wife, Edith Isabel (née Walrond; later Dame Edith Benyon, GBE), of Kingston Maurward House near Dorchester, Dorset. His father changed his surname to Benyon after inheriting Englefield House in Berkshire from his uncle, Richard Fellowes Benyon, in 1897. He was educated at Eton College and Trinity Hall, Cambridge.

Benyon lived at Ufton Court during his father's lifetime. He was a captain in the Berkshire Yeomanry during World War I, serving in Egypt. At home, he served as High Sheriff of Berkshire in 1925 and was the Lord Lieutenant from 28 March 1945 until his death in 1959. He was also a Berkshire County Councillor. He had inherited his father's estates – as well as the patronage of St Mark's Church, Englefield and St Peter's Church, De Beauvoir Town, Hackney – in 1935 and was created a baronet, of Englefield in the Royal County of Berkshire on 8 July 1958.

In 1915, he married Violet Eveline, daughter of Sir Cuthbert Edgar Peek. Sir Henry Benyon died on 15 June 1959, aged 74, but left no heirs-male and Englefield passed to his second cousin-once-removed, William Richard Shelley.

== Sources ==
- Burke's Landed Gentry.
- Who's Who Series. (1936). Who's Who in Berkshire. London.

Honorary titles
Preceded by Arthur Thomas Loyd	Lord Lieutenant of Berkshire; 1945–1959	Succeeded by Hon. David John Smith
Baronetage of the United Kingdom
New creation	Baronet (of Englefield, Berkshire); 1958–1959	Extinct
