= Peter Butler (politician) =

British Conservative Party politician

Member of Parliament for North East Milton Keynes
- In office 9 April 1992 – 8 April 1997
- Preceded by: New constituency
- Succeeded by: Brian White

Personal details
- Born: 10 June 1951 (age 74) Newport, Shropshire, England
- Party: Conservative
- Profession: Solicitor

Peter Butler (born 10 June 1951) is a British Conservative Party politician. At the 1992 general election, he became the first Member of Parliament (MP) for the new constituency of North East Milton Keynes, winning the seat with a majority of over 14,000. A former solicitor, he served as a PPS to Kenneth Clarke.

Butler served only one term in Parliament. At the 1997 election, he lost the seat by only 240 votes to Labour's Brian White.

A Freemason, Butler was Worshipful Master of the Oxford-based Apollo University Lodge 357 from 1992 to 1993.

Parliament of the United Kingdom
New constituency	Member of Parliament for North East Milton Keynes; 1992–1997	Succeeded by Brian White
