= Milton Keynes South =

UK Parliament constituency (2010–2024)

Coordinates: 52.021°N 0.687°W

- Former borough constituency for the House of Commons
- Boundary of Milton Keynes South in Buckinghamshire

- Location of Buckinghamshire within England
- County: Buckinghamshire
- Population: 135,909
- Electorate: 92,011 (2018)
- Major settlements: Milton Keynes

2010–2024
- Created from: Milton Keynes South West, North East Milton Keynes
- Replaced by: Buckingham and Bletchley; Milton Keynes North; Milton Keynes Central

Milton Keynes South was a constituency (Note: A borough constituency (for the purposes of election expenses and type of returning officer)) in the House of Commons of the United Kingdom from 2010 until 2024. It was represented in Parliament from its creation until its abolition by Iain Stewart of the Conservative Party. (Note: As with all constituencies, the constituency elects one Member of Parliament (MP) by the first past the post system of election at least every five years.)

In its 2023 review of Westminster constituencies, the Boundary Commission proposed to abolish this constituency. Its area was divided three ways for the 2024 general election, with the majority forming the new constituency of Milton Keynes Central, and smaller portions becoming parts of Milton Keynes North and Buckingham and Bletchley.

== History ==
This constituency (and its counterpart, Milton Keynes North), came into being when the two Milton Keynes constituencies (Milton Keynes North East and Milton Keynes South West) were reconfigured following the Boundary Commission's Fifth periodic review of Westminster constituencies with the aim of equalising the electorate as between the constituencies in the light of population growth that had occurred mainly in the Milton Keynes Urban Area. This constituency was the more urban of the two.

Iain Stewart MP won the new constituency for the Conservatives in the 2010 general election. This new constituency was a very large part of the former Milton Keynes South West, which had been held by Phyllis Starkey for Labour for 13 years until the 2010 general election.

In the 2015 general election, Iain Stewart again won the Milton Keynes South constituency for the Conservative Party.

== Boundaries ==
Map of boundaries 2013–2024

The constituency takes up the smaller part but more dense part of the City of Milton Keynes and is one of the borough's two constituencies. Milton Keynes South is primarily an urban area with some rural elements; the other, Milton Keynes North, covers a larger area and is more rural.

At its creation the constituency comprised the electoral wards of Bletchley and Fenny Stratford, Danesborough, Denbigh, Eaton Manor, Emerson Valley, Furzton, Loughton Park, Stony Stratford, Walton Park, Whaddon and Woughton.

Following a revision to the ward boundaries in 2013, the seat comprises part or all of the following Council electoral wards:

- Bletchley East
- Bletchley Park
- Bletchley West
- Bradwell (part)
- Broughton (part)
- Campbell Park & Old Woughton
- Danesborough & Walton
- Loughton & Shenley
- Monkston (part)
- Shenley Brook End
- Stony Stratford
- Woughton & Fishermead (part)

The City Council ward boundaries do not generally coincide with the town and parish council areas. Each ward returns three councillors so their electorates are broadly equal.

== Abolition ==
Further to the completion of the 2023 review of Westminster constituencies, the seat was abolished prior to the 2024 general election, with its contents distributed three ways:

- Southern areas, comprising the three Bletchley wards together with Tattenhoe, to be combined with parts of the (to be abolished) constituency of Buckingham – including the town of Buckingham – to form the newly created constituency of Buckingham and Bletchley
- Stony Stratford to the reconfigured Milton Keynes North seat
- Remaining parts to be incorporated into the new constituency of Milton Keynes Central

== Members of Parliament ==
Election	Member	Party
2010	Iain Stewart	Conservative

== Elections ==
=== Elections in the 2010s ===
General election 2019: Milton Keynes South
Party	Candidate	Votes	%	±%
Conservative	Iain Stewart	32,011	50.0	+2.5
Labour	Hannah O'Neill	25,067	39.2	−5.7
Liberal Democrats	Saleyha Ahsan	4,688	7.3	+4.4
Green	Alan Francis	1,495	2.3	+0.5
Independent	Stephen Fulton	539	0.8	New
CPA	Amarachi Ogba	207	0.3	New
Majority		6,944	10.8	+8.2
Turnout		64,007	66.4	−3.4
Conservative hold		Swing		

General election 2017: Milton Keynes South
Party	Candidate	Votes	%	±%
Conservative	Iain Stewart	30,652	47.5	+0.7
Labour	Hannah O'Neill	28,987	44.9	+12.8
Liberal Democrats	Tahir Maher	1,895	2.9	−1.0
UKIP	Vince Peddle	1,833	2.8	−10.4
Green	Graham Findlay	1,179	1.8	−1.5
Majority		1,665	2.6	−12.1
Turnout		64,486	69.8	+4.0
Conservative hold		Swing	-6.0	

General election 2015: Milton Keynes South
Party	Candidate	Votes	%	±%
Conservative	Iain Stewart	27,601	46.8	+5.2
Labour	Andrew Pakes	18,929	32.1	−0.1
UKIP	Vince Peddle	7,803	13.2	+9.5
Liberal Democrats	Lisa Smith	2,309	3.9	−13.8
Green	Samantha Pancheri	1,936	3.3	+1.9
Independent	Stephen Fulton	255	0.4	New
Keep It Real Party	Matthew Gibson	116	0.2	New
Majority		8,672	14.7	+5.3
Turnout		59,019	65.8	+1.9
Conservative hold		Swing	+2.6	

General election 2010: Milton Keynes South
Party	Candidate	Votes	%	±%
Conservative	Iain Stewart	23,034	41.6	
Labour	Phyllis Starkey (Note: Served as an MP in the three elections won under the Blair Ministry)	17,833	32.2	
Liberal Democrats	Peter Jones	9,787	17.7	
UKIP	Philip Pinto	2,074	3.7	
BNP	Matthew Tait	1,502	2.7	
Green	Katrina Deacon	774	1.4	
CPA	Suzanne Nti	245	0.4	
Nationwide Reform Party	Jonathan Worth	84	0.2	
Majority		5,201	9.4	
Turnout		55,333	63.9	
Conservative win (new seat)				

== See also ==
- Milton Keynes North
- List of parliamentary constituencies in Buckinghamshire
