= James Herbert Benyon =

James Herbert Benyon (born Fellowes; 1849–1935) was an early 20th-century Lord Lieutenant of Berkshire.

== Early life ==
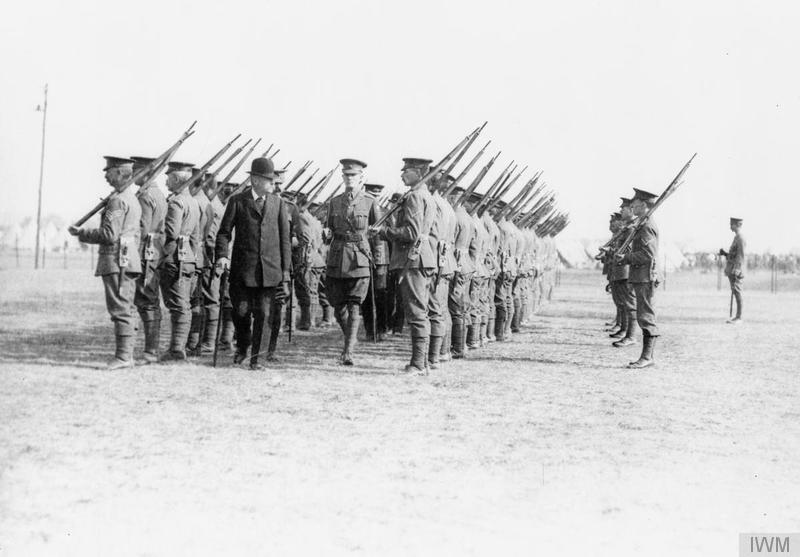
James Herbert Benyon, Lord Lieutenant of Berkshire, inspects men of the Royal Berkshire Regiment at Newbury Racecourse in October 1914.

Born James Herbert Fellowes, he was the son of James Fellowes of Kingston Maurward House near Dorchester, Dorset who was the youngest son of William Henry Fellowes of Ramsey Abbey in Huntingdonshire by his wife, Emma the daughter of Richard Benyon of Gidea Hall in Essex. In 1897, he took the name of Benyon upon inheriting his uncle's estate at Englefield in Berkshire.

== Career ==
He trained as a barrister and became High Sheriff of Dorset in 1892 and Lord Lieutenant of Berkshire in August 1901, a post he held until his death. He was also first chairman of the Berkshire Education Committee (1902 onwards), chairman of Berkshire County Council (1916–1926) and the first Chancellor of the University of Reading after it gained its charter in 1926. He was on the governing body of Abingdon School from 1902 until his death in 1934 and was the Chairman of the Governors from 1903 to 1927.

== Personal life ==
By his wife Dame Edith Benyon GBE (née Walrond; 1857-1919), he was the father of Sir Henry Benyon.

Honorary titles
| Preceded by The Lord Wantage | Lord Lieutenant of Berkshire; 1901–1935 | Succeeded by Arthur Thomas Loyd |
Academic offices
| New institution | Chancellor of the University of Reading; 1926–1935 | Succeeded by Sir Austen Chamberlain |
