= List of United Kingdom Liberal Democrat MPs (2019–2024) =

Eleven Liberal Democrat members of Parliament (MPs) were elected to the House of Commons of the United Kingdom at the 2019 general election. Four more were subsequently elected at parliamentary by-elections in Chesham and Amersham, North Shropshire, Tiverton and Honiton and Somerton and Frome bringing the total to 15.

== MPs ==
Name	Parliamentary roles	Age	Time in Parliament	Constituency	Majority	State party (Note: See article 2.1 of The Federal Constitution of the Liberal Democrats)	Regional party
Ed Davey	Leader of the Liberal Democrats	60	1997–2015; 2017–present	Kingston and Surbiton	10,489	England	London
Daisy Cooper	Deputy Leader of the Liberal Democrats	44	2019–present	St Albans	6,293	England	East of England
Daisy Cooper	Health & Social Care spokesperson	44	2019–present	St Albans	6,293	England	East of England
Christine Jardine	Cabinet Office spokesperson	65	2017–present	Edinburgh West	3,769	Scotland	
Christine Jardine	Women and Equalities spokesperson	65	2017–present	Edinburgh West	3,769	Scotland	
Christine Jardine	Scotland spokesperson	65	2017–present	Edinburgh West	3,769	Scotland	
Alistair Carmichael	Liberal Democrat Home Affairs spokesperson	60	2001–present	Orkney and Shetland	2,507	Scotland	
Alistair Carmichael	Northern Ireland spokesperson	60	2001–present	Orkney and Shetland	2,507	Scotland	
Alistair Carmichael	Justice spokesperson	60	2001–present	Orkney and Shetland	2,507	Scotland	
Layla Moran	Foreign and Commonwealth Affairs spokesperson	43	2017–present	Oxford West and Abingdon	8,943	England	South Central
Layla Moran	International Development spokesperson	43	2017–present	Oxford West and Abingdon	8,943	England	South Central
Wendy Chamberlain	Chief Whip in the House of Commons	49	2019–present	Fife North East	1,316	Scotland	
Wendy Chamberlain	Social Justice spokesperson	49	2019–present	Fife North East	1,316	Scotland	
Jamie Stone	Digital, Culture, Media and Sport spokesperson	72	2017–present	Caithness, Sutherland and Easter Ross	204	Scotland	
Jamie Stone	Defence spokesperson (until October 2022)	72	2017–present	Caithness, Sutherland and Easter Ross	204	Scotland	
Sarah Olney	Liberal Democrat Treasury spokesperson	49	2016–17; 2019–present	Richmond Park	7,766	England	London
Sarah Olney	Business and Industrial Strategy spokesperson	49	2016–17; 2019–present	Richmond Park	7,766	England	London
Tim Farron	Environment, Food and Rural Affairs spokesperson	56	2005–present	Westmorland and Lonsdale	1,934	England	North West
Wera Hobhouse	Energy and Climate Change spokesperson	66	2017–present	Bath	12,322	England	Western Counties
Wera Hobhouse	Transport spokesperson	66	2017–present	Bath	12,322	England	Western Counties
Wera Hobhouse	Liberal Democrat Leader of the House	66	2017–present	Bath	12,322	England	Western Counties
Munira Wilson	Education spokesperson	48	2019–present	Twickenham	14,121	England	London
Sarah Green	International Trade spokesperson	44	2021–present	Chesham and Amersham	8,028	England	South Central
Sarah Green	Wales spokesperson	44	2021–present	Chesham and Amersham	8,028	England	South Central
Helen Morgan	Housing, Communities and Local Government spokesperson	51	2021–present	North Shropshire	5,925	England	West Midlands
Richard Foord	Defence spokesperson (from October 2022)	48	2022–present	Tiverton and Honiton	6,144	England	Devon and Cornwall
Sarah Dyke			2023–present	Somerton and Frome	11,008	England	Somerset

== See also ==
- List of MPs elected in the 2019 United Kingdom general election
- List of MPs for constituencies in England (2019–2024)
- List of MPs for constituencies in Northern Ireland (2019–2024)
- List of MPs for constituencies in Scotland (2019–2024)
- List of MPs for constituencies in Wales (2019–2024)
