= List of MPs for constituencies in England (2019–2024) =

- Colours on map indicate the party allegiance of each constituency's MP

This is a list of members of Parliament (MPs) elected to the House of Commons of the United Kingdom by English constituencies for the Fifty-Eighth Parliament of the United Kingdom (2019–2024).

It includes both MPs elected at the 2019 general election, held on 12 December 2019, and those subsequently elected in by-elections.

The list is sorted by the name of the MP, and MPs who did not serve throughout the Parliament are italicised. New MPs elected since the general election are noted at the bottom of the page.

== Composition ==
=== Election ===
Affiliation	Members
Conservative Party	345
Labour Party	179
Liberal Democrats	7
Green Party	1
Speaker	1
Total	533

=== At dissolution ===
Affiliation	Members
Conservative Party	327
Labour Party	183
Liberal Democrats	11
Independent	8
Green Party	1
Reform UK	1
Workers Party	1
Speaker	1
Total	533

Number of seats by party (at election)
1. Conservatives (64.5%)
2. Labour (33.6%)
3. Lib Dems (1.50%)

== MPs in the East of England region ==
Affiliation	Members
Conservative	51
Labour	7
Liberal Democrats	1
Total	59

MP	Constituency	Party	In constituency since
Bim Afolami	Hitchin and Harpenden	Conservative	2017
Peter Aldous	Waveney	Conservative	2010
Anna Firth	Southend West	Conservative	2022
Richard Bacon	South Norfolk	Conservative	2001
Kemi Badenoch	Saffron Walden	Conservative	2017
Duncan Baker	North Norfolk	Conservative	2019
Steve Barclay	North East Cambridgeshire	Conservative	2010
John Baron	Basildon and Billericay	Conservative	2010
Paul Bristow	Peterborough	Conservative	2019
Anthony Browne	South Cambridgeshire	Conservative	2019
Alex Burghart	Brentwood and Ongar	Conservative	2017
James Cartlidge	South Suffolk	Conservative	2015
Jo Churchill	Bury St Edmunds	Conservative	2010
James Cleverly	Braintree	Conservative	2015
Thérèse Coffey	Suffolk Coastal	Conservative	2010
Daisy Cooper	St Albans	Liberal Democrats	2019
Jonathan Djanogly	Huntingdon	Conservative	2001
Nadine Dorries	Mid Bedfordshire	Conservative	2005
Oliver Dowden	Hertsmere	Conservative	2015
Jackie Doyle-Price	Thurrock	Conservative	2010
James Duddridge	Rochford and Southend East	Conservative	2005
Anna Firth	Southend West	Conservative	2022 by-election
Vicky Ford	Chelmsford	Conservative	2017
Mark Francois	Rayleigh and Wickford	Conservative	2010
Lucy Frazer	South East Cambridgeshire	Conservative	2015
George Freeman	Mid Norfolk	Conservative	2010
Richard Fuller	North East Bedfordshire	Conservative	2019
Robert Halfon	Harlow	Conservative	2010
Matt Hancock	West Suffolk	Conservative	2010
Rebecca Harris	Castle Point	Conservative	2010
Oliver Heald	North East Hertfordshire	Conservative	1992
Rachel Hopkins	Luton South	Labour	2019
Tom Hunt	Ipswich	Conservative	2019
Bernard Jenkin	Harwich and North Essex	Conservative	2010
Eleanor Laing	Epping Forest	Conservative	1997
Brandon Lewis	Great Yarmouth	Conservative	2010
Clive Lewis	Norwich South	Labour	2015
Julie Marson	Hertford and Stortford	Conservative	2019
Jerome Mayhew	Broadland	Conservative	2019
Stephen McPartland	Stevenage	Conservative	2010
Stephen Metcalfe	South Basildon and East Thurrock	Conservative	2010
Gagan Mohindra	South West Hertfordshire	Conservative	2019
Sarah Owen	Luton North	Labour	2019
Priti Patel	Witham	Conservative	2010
Mike Penning	Hemel Hempstead	Conservative	2005
Daniel Poulter	Central Suffolk and North Ipswich	Labour (Note: Poulter was elected as a Conservative, but defected to Labour in April 2024.)	2010
Will Quince	Colchester	Conservative	2015
Dean Russell	Watford	Conservative	2019
Andrew Selous	South West Bedfordshire	Conservative	2001
Grant Shapps	Welwyn Hatfield	Conservative	2005
Chloe Smith	Norwich North	Conservative	2009 by-election
Alistair Strathern	Mid Bedfordshire	Labour	2023 by-election
Liz Truss	South West Norfolk	Conservative	2010
Shailesh Vara	North West Cambridgeshire	Conservative	2005
Charles Walker	Broxbourne	Conservative	2005
Giles Watling	Clacton	Conservative	2017
John Whittingdale	Maldon	Conservative	2010
James Wild	North West Norfolk	Conservative	2019
Mohammad Yasin	Bedford	Labour	2017
Daniel Zeichner	Cambridge	Labour	2015

== MPs in the East Midlands region ==
Affiliation	Members
Conservative	36
Labour	8
Reform UK	1
Independent	3
Total	48

MP	Constituency	Party	In constituency since
Lee Anderson	Ashfield	Reform (Note: Anderson was elected as a Conservative candidate in the 2019 election before his suspension from the party in February 2024. He joined Reform UK in March.)	2019
Edward Argar	Charnwood	Conservative	2015
Jonathan Ashworth	Leicester South	Labour Co-op	2011 by-election
Victoria Atkins	Louth and Horncastle	Conservative	2015
Margaret Beckett	Derby South	Labour	1983
Peter Bone	Wellingborough	Independent	2005
Ben Bradley	Mansfield	Conservative	2017
Andrew Bridgen	North West Leicestershire	Independent (Note: Bridgen was elected as a Conservative candidate in the 2010 election before his expulsion from the party in April 2023. He joined the Reclaim Party in May but resigned from it in December.)	2010
Brendan Clarke-Smith	Bassetlaw	Conservative	2019
Alberto Costa	South Leicestershire	Conservative	2015
Gareth Davies	Grantham and Stamford	Conservative	2019
Sarah Dines	Derbyshire Dales	Conservative	2019
Ruth Edwards	Rushcliffe	Conservative	2019
Michael Ellis	Northampton North	Conservative	2010
Luke Evans	Bosworth	Conservative	2019
Mark Fletcher	Bolsover	Conservative	2019
Lilian Greenwood	Nottingham South	Labour	2010
John Hayes	South Holland and The Deepings	Conservative	1997
Chris Heaton-Harris	Daventry	Conservative	2010
Darren Henry	Broxtowe	Conservative	2019
Philip Hollobone	Kettering	Conservative	2010
Jane Hunt	Loughborough	Conservative	2019
Robert Jenrick	Newark	Conservative	2014 by-election
Caroline Johnson	Sleaford and North Hykeham	Conservative	2016 by-election
Alicia Kearns	Rutland and Melton	Conservative	2019
Liz Kendall	Leicester West	Labour	2010
Gen Kitchen	Wellingborough	Labour	2024 by-election
Robert Largan	High Peak	Conservative	2019
Pauline Latham	Mid Derbyshire	Conservative	2010
Andrea Leadsom	South Northamptonshire	Conservative	2010
Edward Leigh	Gainsborough	Conservative	1983
Andrew Lewer	Northampton South	Conservative	2017
Karl McCartney	Lincoln	Conservative	2019
Nigel Mills	Amber Valley	Conservative	2010
Alex Norris	Nottingham North	Labour Co-op	2017
Neil O'Brien	Harborough	Conservative	2017
Toby Perkins	Chesterfield	Labour	2010
Tom Pursglove	Corby	Conservative	2015
Lee Rowley	North East Derbyshire	Conservative	2017
Tom Randall	Gedling	Conservative	2019
Amanda Solloway	Derby North	Conservative	2019
Mark Spencer	Sherwood	Conservative	2010
Maggie Throup	Erewash	Conservative	2015
Matt Warman	Boston and Skegness	Conservative	2015
Claudia Webbe	Leicester East	Independent (Note: Webbe was elected as a Labour candidate in the 2019 election before her expulsion from the party in November 2021.)	2019
Heather Wheeler	South Derbyshire	Conservative	2010
Nadia Whittome	Nottingham East	Labour	2019

== MPs in the London region ==
Affiliation	Members
Labour	50
Conservative	23
Liberal Democrats	3
Independent	1
Total	76

MP	Constituency	Party	In constituency since
Diane Abbott	Hackney North and Stoke Newington	Labour	1987
Nickie Aiken	Cities of London and Westminster	Conservative	2019
Rushanara Ali	Bethnal Green and Bow	Labour	2010
Rosena Allin-Khan	Tooting	Labour	2016 by-election
Fleur Anderson	Putney	Labour	2019
Gareth Bacon	Orpington	Conservative	2019
Apsana Begum	Poplar and Limehouse	Labour	2019
Bob Blackman	Harrow East	Conservative	2010
James Brokenshire	Old Bexley and Sidcup	Conservative	2005
Lyn Brown	West Ham	Labour	2005
Felicity Buchan	Kensington	Conservative	2019
Karen Buck	Westminster North	Labour	2010
Dawn Butler	Brent Central	Labour	2015
Ruth Cadbury	Brentford and Isleworth	Labour	2015
Bambos Charalambous	Enfield Southgate	Labour	2017
Feryal Clark	Enfield North	Labour	2019
Elliot Colburn	Carshalton and Wallington	Conservative	2019
Jeremy Corbyn	Islington North	Independent (Note: Corbyn was suspended from Labour in October 2020 and reinstated to the party in November but the parliamentary whip was not restored again. He was expelled from Labour in May 2024 and sat as an independent.)	1983
Neil Coyle	Bermondsey and Old Southwark	Labour	2015
Stella Creasy	Walthamstow	Labour Co-op	2010
Jon Cruddas	Dagenham and Rainham	Labour	2010
John Cryer	Leyton and Wanstead	Labour	2010
Janet Daby	Lewisham East	Labour	2018 by-election
Ed Davey	Kingston and Surbiton	Liberal Democrats	2017 (Note: Davey was defeated in the 2015 election and re-entered the House in the 2017 election.)
Marsha de Cordova	Battersea	Labour	2017
Iain Duncan Smith	Chingford and Woodford Green	Conservative	1997
Clive Efford	Eltham	Labour	1997
Florence Eshalomi	Vauxhall	Labour	2019
David Evennett	Bexleyheath and Crayford	Conservative	2005
Vicky Foxcroft	Lewisham Deptford	Labour	2015
Mike Freer	Finchley and Golders Green	Conservative	2010
Louie French	Old Bexley and Sidcup	Conservative	2021 by-election
Barry Gardiner	Brent North	Labour	1997
Stephen Hammond	Wimbledon	Conservative	2005
Greg Hands	Chelsea and Fulham	Conservative	2010
Harriet Harman	Camberwell and Peckham	Labour	1997
Helen Hayes	Dulwich and West Norwood	Labour	2015
Meg Hillier	Hackney South and Shoreditch	Labour Co-op	2005
Margaret Hodge	Barking	Labour	1994 by-election
Rupa Huq	Ealing Central and Acton	Labour	2015
Boris Johnson	Uxbridge and South Ruislip	Conservative	2015
Sarah Jones	Croydon Central	Labour	2017
David Lammy	Tottenham	Labour	2000 by-election
Julia Lopez	Hornchurch and Upminster	Conservative	2017
Seema Malhotra	Feltham and Heston	Labour Co-op	2011 by-election
Siobhain McDonagh	Mitcham and Morden	Labour	1997
John McDonnell	Hayes and Harlington	Labour	1997
James Murray	Ealing North	Labour Co-op	2019
Bob Neill	Bromley and Chislehurst	Conservative	2006 by-election
Matthew Offord	Hendon	Conservative	2010
Sarah Olney	Richmond Park	Liberal Democrats	2019 (Note: Olney was defeated in the 2017 election and re-entered the House in the 2019 election.)
Abena Oppong-Asare	Erith and Thamesmead	Labour	2019
Kate Osamor	Edmonton	Labour Co-op	2015
Matthew Pennycook	Greenwich and Woolwich	Labour	2015
Chris Philp	Croydon South	Conservative	2015
Steve Reed	Croydon North	Labour Co-op	2012 by-election
Ellie Reeves	Lewisham West and Penge	Labour	2017
Bell Ribeiro-Addy	Streatham	Labour	2019
Andrew Rosindell	Romford	Conservative	2001
Paul Scully	Sutton and Cheam	Conservative	2015
Virendra Sharma	Ealing Southall	Labour	2007 by-election
Tulip Siddiq	Hampstead and Kilburn	Labour	2015
David Simmonds	Ruislip, Northwood and Pinner	Conservative	2019
Andy Slaughter	Hammersmith	Labour	2010
Keir Starmer	Holborn and St Pancras	Labour	2015
Bob Stewart	Beckenham	Conservative	2010
Wes Streeting	Ilford North	Labour	2015
Sam Tarry	Ilford South	Labour	2019
Gareth Thomas	Harrow West	Labour Co-op	1997
Emily Thornberry	Islington South and Finsbury	Labour	2005
Stephen Timms	East Ham	Labour	1997
Steve Tuckwell	Uxbridge and South Ruislip	Conservative	2023 by-election
Theresa Villiers	Chipping Barnet	Conservative	2005
Catherine West	Hornsey and Wood Green	Labour	2015
Munira Wilson	Twickenham	Liberal Democrats	2019

== MPs in the North East region ==
Affiliation	Members
Labour	18
Conservative	11
Independent	1
Total	30

MP	Constituency	Party	In constituency since
Nick Brown	Newcastle upon Tyne East	Independent (Note: Nick Brown was suspended from Labour in September 2022 and resigned from the party in December 2023. He sat as an independent.)	2010
Alan Campbell	Tynemouth	Labour	1997
Simon Clarke	Middlesbrough South and East Cleveland	Conservative	2017
Alex Cunningham	Stockton North	Labour	2010
Dehenna Davison	Bishop Auckland	Conservative	2019
Julie Elliott	Sunderland Central	Labour	2010
Mary Foy	City of Durham	Labour	2019
Peter Gibson	Darlington	Conservative	2019
Mary Glindon	North Tyneside	Labour	2010
Mike Hill	Hartlepool	Labour	2017
Sharon Hodgson	Washington and Sunderland West	Labour	2010
Richard Holden	North West Durham	Conservative	2019
Paul Howell	Sedgefield	Conservative	2019
Kevan Jones	North Durham	Labour	2001
Ian Lavery	Wansbeck	Labour	2010
Ian Levy	Blyth Valley	Conservative	2019
Emma Lewell-Buck	South Shields	Labour	2013 by-election
Andy McDonald	Middlesbrough	Labour	2012 by-election
Catherine McKinnell	Newcastle upon Tyne North	Labour	2010
Ian Mearns	Gateshead	Labour	2010
Grahame Morris	Easington	Labour	2010
Jill Mortimer	Hartlepool	Conservative	2021 by-election
Chi Onwurah	Newcastle upon Tyne Central	Labour	2010
Guy Opperman	Hexham	Conservative	2010
Kate Osborne	Jarrow	Labour	2019
Bridget Phillipson	Houghton and Sunderland South	Labour	2010
Anne-Marie Trevelyan	Berwick-upon-Tweed	Conservative	2015
Liz Twist	Blaydon	Labour	2017
Matt Vickers	Stockton South	Conservative	2019
Jacob Young	Redcar	Conservative	2019

== MPs in the North West region ==
Affiliation	Members
Labour	44
Conservative	30
Liberal Democrats	1
Speaker	1
Workers	1
Independent	3
Total	78

MP	Constituency	Party	In constituency since
Debbie Abrahams	Oldham East and Saddleworth	Labour	2011 by-election
Mike Amesbury	Weaver Vale	Labour	2017
Paula Barker	Liverpool Wavertree	Labour	2019
Scott Benton	Blackpool South	Independent	2019
Jake Berry	Rossendale and Darwen	Conservative	2010
Graham Brady	Altrincham and Sale West	Conservative	1997
Sara Britcliffe	Hyndburn	Conservative	2019
Fiona Bruce	Congleton	Conservative	2010
Ian Byrne	Liverpool West Derby	Labour	2019
Dan Carden	Liverpool Walton	Labour	2017
Andy Carter	Warrington South	Conservative	2019
Chris Clarkson	Heywood and Middleton	Conservative	2019
Rosie Cooper	West Lancashire	Labour	2005
Ashley Dalton	West Lancashire	Labour	2023 by-election
James Daly	Bury North	Conservative	2019
Samantha Dixon	City of Chester	Labour	2022 by-election
Peter Dowd	Bootle	Labour	2015
Angela Eagle	Wallasey	Labour	1992
Maria Eagle	Garston and Halewood	Labour	2010
Bill Esterson	Sefton Central	Labour	2010
Nigel Evans	Ribble Valley	Conservative	1992
Tim Farron	Westmorland and Lonsdale	Liberal Democrats	2005
Simon Fell	Barrow and Furness	Conservative	2019
Katherine Fletcher	South Ribble	Conservative	2019
Yvonne Fovargue	Makerfield	Labour	2010
George Galloway (Note: Galloway previously served in the House as the Member for Glasgow Hillhead (Scotland) from 1987 to 1997, the Member for Glasgow Kelvin (Scotland) from 1997 to 2005, the Member for Bethnal Green and Bow from 2005 to 2010, and the Member for Bradford West from 2012 to 2015.)	Rochdale	Workers	2024 by-election
Chris Green	Bolton West	Conservative	2015
Kate Green	Stretford and Urmston	Labour	2010
Margaret Greenwood	Wirral West	Labour	2015
James Grundy	Leigh	Conservative	2019
Andrew Gwynne	Denton and Reddish	Labour	2005
Trudy Harrison	Copeland	Conservative	2017 by-election
Antony Higginbotham	Burnley	Conservative	2019
Mark Hendrick	Preston	Labour Co-op	2000 by-election
Kate Hollern	Blackburn	Labour	2015
George Howarth	Knowsley	Labour	2010
Lindsay Hoyle	Chorley	Speaker	1997
Neil Hudson	Penrith and The Border	Conservative	2019
Mark Jenkinson	Workington	Conservative	2019
Kim Johnson	Liverpool Riverside	Labour	2019
Mike Kane	Wythenshawe and Sale East	Labour	2014 by-election
Barbara Keeley	Worsley and Eccles South	Labour	2010
Afzal Khan	Manchester Gorton	Labour	2017
Tony Lloyd	Rochdale	Labour	2017 (Note: Lloyd previously served in the House as the Member for Stretford from 1983 to 1997 and the Member for Manchester Central from 1997 to 2012.)
Mark Logan	Bolton North East	Conservative	2019
Rebecca Long-Bailey	Salford and Eccles	Labour	2015
Justin Madders	Ellesmere Port and Neston	Labour	2015
Chris Matheson	City of Chester	Labour	2015
Paul Maynard	Blackpool North and Cleveleys	Conservative	2010
Conor McGinn	St Helens North	Independent	2015
Alison McGovern	Wirral South	Labour	2010
Jim McMahon	Oldham West and Royton	Labour Co-op	2015 by-election
Esther McVey	Tatton	Conservative	2017 (Note: McVey previously served in the House as the Member for Wirral West from 2010 to 2015.)
Mark Menzies	Fylde	Conservative	2010
Nav Mishra	Stockport	Labour	2019
Damien Moore	Southport	Conservative	2017
David Morris	Morecambe and Lunesdale	Conservative	2010
Kieran Mullan	Crewe and Nantwich	Conservative	2019
Lisa Nandy	Wigan	Labour	2010
Charlotte Nichols	Warrington North	Labour	2019
Lucy Powell	Manchester Central	Labour Co-op	2012 by-election
Yasmin Qureshi	Bolton South East	Labour	2010
Angela Rayner	Ashton-under-Lyne	Labour	2015
Jonathan Reynolds	Stalybridge and Hyde	Labour Co-op	2010
Marie Rimmer	St Helens South and Whiston	Labour	2015
Mary Robinson	Cheadle	Conservative	2015
David Rutley	Macclesfield	Conservative	2010
Cat Smith	Lancaster and Fleetwood	Labour	2015
Jeff Smith	Manchester Withington	Labour	2015
Andrew Stephenson	Pendle	Conservative	2010
John Stevenson	Carlisle	Conservative	2010
Graham Stringer	Blackley and Broughton	Labour	2010
Edward Timpson	Eddisbury	Conservative	2019
Derek Twigg	Halton	Labour	1997
Christian Wakeford	Bury South	Labour (Note: Wakeford was elected as a Conservative in the 2019 election before defecting to Labour in January 2022.)	2019
Ben Wallace	Wyre and Preston North	Conservative	2010
Chris Webb	Blackpool South	Labour	2024 by-election
Andrew Western	Stretford and Urmston	Labour	2022 by-election
Mick Whitley	Birkenhead	Labour	2019
William Wragg	Hazel Grove	Independent	2015

== MPs in the South East region ==
Affiliation	Members
Conservative	72
Labour	8
Liberal Democrats	2
Green	1
Independent	2
Total	85

MP	Constituency	Party	In constituency since
Adam Afriyie	Windsor	Conservative	2005
Caroline Ansell	Eastbourne	Conservative	2019
Steve Baker	Wycombe	Conservative	2010
Paul Beresford	Mole Valley	Conservative	1997
Crispin Blunt	Reigate	Independent	1997
Peter Bottomley	Worthing West	Conservative	1997
Steve Brine	Winchester	Conservative	2010
Rob Butler	Aylesbury	Conservative	2019
Maria Caulfield	Lewes	Conservative	2015
Rehman Chishti	Gillingham and Rainham	Conservative	2010
Greg Clark	Tunbridge Wells	Conservative	2005
Damian Collins	Folkestone and Hythe	Conservative	2010
Robert Courts	Witney	Conservative	2016 by-election
Claire Coutinho	East Surrey	Conservative	2019
Tracey Crouch	Chatham and Aylesford	Conservative	2010
Mims Davies	Mid Sussex	Conservative	2019 (Note: Davies previously served in the House as the Member for Eastleigh from 2015 to 2019.)
Tan Dhesi	Slough	Labour	2017
Caroline Dinenage	Gosport	Conservative	2010
Leo Docherty	Aldershot	Conservative	2017
Anneliese Dodds	Oxford East	Labour Co-op	2017
Flick Drummond	Meon Valley	Conservative	2019
Rosie Duffield	Canterbury	Labour	2017
Natalie Elphicke	Dover	Labour (Note: Elphicke was elected as a Conservative, but defected to Labour in May 2024.)	2019
Ben Everitt	Milton Keynes North	Conservative	2019
Laura Farris	Newbury	Conservative	2019
Suella Braverman	Fareham	Conservative	2015
Roger Gale	North Thanet	Conservative	1983
Nus Ghani	Wealden	Conservative	2015
Nick Gibb	Bognor Regis and Littlehampton	Conservative	1997
Cheryl Gillan	Chesham and Amersham	Conservative	1992
Michael Gove	Surrey Heath	Conservative	2005
Helen Grant	Maidstone and The Weald	Conservative	2010
Chris Grayling	Epsom and Ewell	Conservative	2001
Damian Green	Ashford	Conservative	1997
Sarah Green	Chesham and Amersham	Liberal Democrats	2021 by-election
Andrew Griffith	Arundel and South Downs	Conservative	2019
Sally-Ann Hart	Hastings and Rye	Conservative	2019
Gordon Henderson	Sittingbourne and Sheppey	Conservative	2010
Damian Hinds	East Hampshire	Conservative	2010
Adam Holloway	Gravesham	Conservative	2005
Paul Holmes	Eastleigh	Conservative	2019
John Howell	Henley	Conservative	2008 by-election
Jeremy Hunt	South West Surrey	Conservative	2005
Ranil Jayawardena	North East Hampshire	Conservative	2015
Gareth Johnson	Dartford	Conservative	2010
David Johnston	Wantage	Conservative	2019
Gillian Keegan	Chichester	Conservative	2017
Kwasi Kwarteng	Spelthorne	Conservative	2010
Peter Kyle	Hove	Labour	2015
Julian Lewis	New Forest East	Conservative	1997
Jonathan Lord	Woking	Conservative	2010
Tim Loughton	East Worthing and Shoreham	Conservative	1997
Caroline Lucas	Brighton Pavilion	Green	2010
Craig Mackinlay	South Thanet	Conservative	2015
Alan Mak	Havant	Conservative	2015
Kit Malthouse	North West Hampshire	Conservative	2015
Theresa May	Maidenhead	Conservative	1997
Huw Merriman	Bexhill and Battle	Conservative	2015
Maria Miller	Basingstoke	Conservative	2005
Layla Moran	Oxford West and Abingdon	Liberal Democrats	2017
Penny Mordaunt	Portsmouth North	Conservative	2010
Stephen Morgan	Portsmouth South	Labour	2017
Joy Morrissey	Beaconsfield	Conservative	2019
Caroline Nokes	Romsey and Southampton North	Conservative	2010
Victoria Prentis	Banbury	Conservative	2015
Jeremy Quin	Horsham	Conservative	2015
Dominic Raab	Esher and Walton	Conservative	2010
John Redwood	Wokingham	Conservative	1987
Angela Richardson	Guildford	Conservative	2019
Matt Rodda	Reading East	Labour	2017
Lloyd Russell-Moyle	Brighton Kemptown	Independent	2017
Bob Seely	Isle of Wight	Conservative	2017
Alok Sharma	Reading West	Conservative	2010
Greg Smith	Buckingham	Conservative	2019
Henry Smith	Crawley	Conservative	2010
Royston Smith	Southampton Itchen	Conservative	2015
Ben Spencer	Runnymede and Weybridge	Conservative	2019
Iain Stewart	Milton Keynes South	Conservative	2010
James Sunderland	Bracknell	Conservative	2019
Desmond Swayne	New Forest West	Conservative	1997
Kelly Tolhurst	Rochester and Strood	Conservative	2015
Laura Trott	Sevenoaks	Conservative	2019
Tom Tugendhat	Tonbridge and Malling	Conservative	2015
Alan Whitehead	Southampton Test	Labour	1997
Helen Whately	Faversham and Mid Kent	Conservative	2015

== MPs in the South West region ==
Affiliation	Members
Conservative	46
Labour	7
Liberal Democrats	3
Independent	2
Total	58

MP	Constituency	Party	In constituency since
Siobhan Baillie	Stroud	Conservative	2019
Ben Bradshaw	Exeter	Labour	1997
Robert Buckland	South Swindon	Conservative	2010
Conor Burns	Bournemouth West	Conservative	2010
Alex Chalk	Cheltenham	Conservative	2015
Christopher Chope	Christchurch	Conservative	1997
Geoffrey Clifton-Brown	The Cotswolds	Conservative	1997
Geoffrey Cox	Torridge and West Devon	Conservative	2005
Thangam Debbonaire	Bristol West	Labour	2015
Michelle Donelan	Chippenham	Conservative	2015
Steve Double	St Austell and Newquay	Conservative	2015
Richard Drax	South Dorset	Conservative	2010
Sarah Dyke	Somerton and Frome	Liberal Democrats	2023 by-election
Damien Egan	Kingswood	Labour	2024 by-election
Tobias Ellwood	Bournemouth East	Conservative	2005
George Eustice	Camborne and Redruth	Conservative	2010
Richard Foord	Tiverton and Honiton	Liberal Democrats	2022 by-election
Kevin Foster	Torbay	Conservative	2015
Liam Fox	North Somerset	Conservative	2010
Marcus Fysh	Yeovil	Conservative	2015
John Glen	Salisbury	Conservative	2010
Richard Graham	Gloucester	Conservative	2010
James Gray	North Wiltshire	Conservative	1997
Luke Hall	Thornbury and Yate	Conservative	2015
Mark Harper	Forest of Dean	Conservative	2005
James Heappey	Wells	Conservative	2015
Simon Hoare	North Dorset	Conservative	2015
Wera Hobhouse	Bath	Liberal Democrats	2017
Darren Jones	Bristol North West	Labour	2017
Simon Jupp	East Devon	Conservative	2019
Danny Kruger	Devizes	Conservative	2019
Ian Liddell-Grainger	Bridgwater and West Somerset	Conservative	2001
Chris Loder	West Dorset	Conservative	2019
Jack Lopresti	Filton and Bradley Stoke	Conservative	2010
Cherilyn Mackrory	Truro and Falmouth	Conservative	2019
Anthony Mangnall	Totnes	Conservative	2019
Scott Mann	North Cornwall	Conservative	2015
Kerry McCarthy	Bristol East	Labour	2005
Johnny Mercer	Plymouth Moor View	Conservative	2015
Anne Marie Morris	Newton Abbot	Conservative	2010
Sheryll Murray	South East Cornwall	Conservative	2010
Andrew Murrison	South West Wiltshire	Conservative	2010
Neil Parish	Tiverton and Honiton	Independent (Note: Parish was elected as a Conservative in the 2010 election before the party whip was withdrawn in April 2022.)	2010
John Penrose	Weston-super-Mare	Conservative	2005
Luke Pollard	Plymouth Sutton and Devonport	Labour Co-op	2017
Rebecca Pow	Taunton Deane	Conservative	2015
Jacob Rees-Mogg	North East Somerset	Conservative	2010
Laurence Robertson	Tewkesbury	Conservative	1997
Selaine Saxby	North Devon	Conservative	2019
Chris Skidmore	Kingswood	Conservative	2010
Karin Smyth	Bristol South	Labour	2015
Gary Streeter	South West Devon	Conservative	1997
Mel Stride	Central Devon	Conservative	2010
Robert Syms	Poole	Conservative	1997
Derek Thomas	St Ives	Conservative	2015
Justin Tomlinson	North Swindon	Conservative	2010
Michael Tomlinson	Mid Dorset and North Poole	Conservative	2015
David Warburton	Somerton and Frome	Independent (Note: Warburton was suspended by the parliamentary Conservatives in April 2022 and sat as an independent.)	2015

== MPs in the West Midlands region ==
Affiliation	Members
Conservative	41
Labour	17
Liberal Democrats	1
Independent	3
Total	62

MP	Constituency	Party	In constituency since
Tahir Ali	Birmingham Hall Green	Labour	2019
Lucy Allan	Telford	Independent	2015
Stuart Anderson	Wolverhampton South West	Conservative	2019
Shaun Bailey	West Bromwich West	Conservative	2019
Harriett Baldwin	West Worcestershire	Conservative	2010
Aaron Bell	Newcastle-under-Lyme	Conservative	2019
Saqib Bhatti	Meriden	Conservative	2019
Karen Bradley	Staffordshire Moorlands	Conservative	2010
Jack Brereton	Stoke-on-Trent South	Conservative	2017
Liam Byrne	Birmingham Hodge Hill	Labour	2004 by-election
Bill Cash	Stone	Conservative	1997
Theodora Clarke	Stafford	Conservative	2019
Jack Dromey	Birmingham Erdington	Labour	2010
Philip Dunne	Ludlow	Conservative	2005
Sarah Edwards	Tamworth	Labour	2023 by-election
Paulette Hamilton	Birmingham Erdington	Labour	2022 by-election
Michael Fabricant	Lichfield	Conservative	1997
Colleen Fletcher	Coventry North East	Labour	2015
Mark Garnier	Wyre Forest	Conservative	2010
Jo Gideon	Stoke-on-Trent Central	Conservative	2019
Preet Gill	Birmingham Edgbaston	Labour Co-op	2017
Kate Kniveton	Burton & Uttoxeter	Conservative	2019
Jonathan Gullis	Stoke-on-Trent North	Conservative	2019
Nigel Huddleston	Mid Worcestershire	Conservative	2015
Eddie Hughes	Walsall North	Conservative	2017
Sajid Javid	Bromsgrove	Conservative	2010
Marcus Jones	Nuneaton	Conservative	2010
Daniel Kawczynski	Shrewsbury and Atcham	Conservative	2005
Julian Knight	Solihull	Independent	2015
Marco Longhi	Dudley North	Conservative	2019
Rachel Maclean	Redditch	Conservative	2017
Khalid Mahmood	Birmingham Perry Barr	Labour	2001
Shabana Mahmood	Birmingham Ladywood	Labour	2010
Steve McCabe	Birmingham Selly Oak	Labour	2010
Pat McFadden	Wolverhampton South East	Labour	2005
Amanda Milling	Cannock Chase	Conservative	2015
Andrew Mitchell	Sutton Coldfield	Conservative	2001
Helen Morgan	North Shropshire	Liberal Democrats	2021 by-election
James Morris	Halesowen and Rowley Regis	Conservative	2010
Wendy Morton	Aldridge-Brownhills	Conservative	2015
Jesse Norman	Hereford and South Herefordshire	Conservative	2010
Taiwo Owatemi	Coventry North West	Labour	2019
Owen Paterson	North Shropshire	Conservative	1997
Mark Pawsey	Rugby	Conservative	2010
Jess Phillips	Birmingham Yardley	Labour	2015
Chris Pincher	Tamworth	Independent (Note: Pincher was suspended by the parliamentary Conservatives in July 2022 and sat as an independent.)	2010
Mark Pritchard	The Wrekin	Conservative	2005
Nicola Richards	West Bromwich East	Conservative	2019
Gary Sambrook	Birmingham Northfield	Conservative	2019
John Spellar	Warley	Labour	1997
Jane Stevenson	Wolverhampton North East	Conservative	2019
Zarah Sultana	Coventry South	Labour	2019
Craig Tracey	North Warwickshire	Conservative	2015
Valerie Vaz	Walsall South	Labour	2010
Robin Walker	Worcester	Conservative	2010
Suzanne Webb	Stourbridge	Conservative	2019
Matt Western	Warwick and Leamington	Labour	2017
Bill Wiggin	North Herefordshire	Conservative	2010
Gavin Williamson	South Staffordshire	Conservative	2010
Mike Wood	Dudley South	Conservative	2015
Jeremy Wright	Kenilworth and Southam	Conservative	2010
Nadhim Zahawi	Stratford-on-Avon	Conservative	2010

== MPs in the Yorkshire and the Humber region ==
Affiliation	Members
Labour	31
Conservative	24
Independent	1
Total	56

MP	Constituency	Party	In constituency since
Nigel Adams	Selby and Ainsty	Conservative	2010
Imran Ahmad Khan	Wakefield	Independent (Note: Ahmad Khan was elected as a Conservative in the 2019 election before his expulsion from the party in April 2022.)	2019
Stuart Andrew	Pudsey	Conservative	2010
Hilary Benn	Leeds Central	Labour	1999 by-election
Clive Betts	Sheffield South East	Labour	2010
Olivia Blake	Sheffield Hallam	Labour	2019
Paul Blomfield	Sheffield Central	Labour	2010
Tracy Brabin (Note: Brabin resigned in May 2021 to take her post as Mayor of West Yorkshire.)	Batley and Spen	Labour Co-op	2016 by-election
Richard Burgon	Leeds East	Labour	2015
Miriam Cates	Penistone and Stocksbridge	Conservative	2019
Sarah Champion	Rotherham	Labour	2012 by-election
Yvette Cooper	Normanton, Pontefract and Castleford	Labour	2010
Judith Cummins	Bradford South	Labour	2015
Philip Davies	Shipley	Conservative	2005
David Davis	Haltemprice and Howden	Conservative	1997
Mark Eastwood	Dewsbury	Conservative	2019
Nick Fletcher	Don Valley	Conservative	2019
Gill Furniss	Sheffield Brightside and Hillsborough	Labour	2016 by-election
Robert Goodwill	Scarborough and Whitby	Conservative	2005
Louise Haigh	Sheffield Heeley	Labour	2015
Fabian Hamilton	Leeds North East	Labour	1997
Emma Hardy	Kingston upon Hull West and Hessle	Labour	2017
John Healey	Wentworth and Dearne	Labour	2010
Kevin Hollinrake	Thirsk and Malton	Conservative	2015
Imran Hussain	Bradford East	Labour	2015
Dan Jarvis	Barnsley Central	Labour	2011 by-election
Andrea Jenkyns	Morley and Outwood	Conservative	2015
Diana Johnson	Kingston upon Hull North	Labour	2005
Andrew Jones	Harrogate and Knaresborough	Conservative	2010
Greg Knight	East Yorkshire	Conservative	2001
Kim Leadbeater	Batley and Spen	Labour	2021 by-election
Simon Lightwood	Wakefield	Labour	2022 by-election
Holly Lynch	Halifax	Labour	2015
Rachael Maskell	York Central	Labour	2015
Keir Mather	Selby and Ainsty	Labour	2023 by-election
Jason McCartney	Colne Valley	Conservative	2019 (Note: McCartney was defeated in the 2017 election and re-entered the House in the 2019 election.)
Ed Miliband	Doncaster North	Labour	2005
Robbie Moore	Keighley	Conservative	2019
Holly Mumby-Croft	Scunthorpe	Conservative	2019
Lia Nici	Great Grimsby	Conservative	2019
Stephanie Peacock	Barnsley East	Labour	2017
Andrew Percy	Brigg and Goole	Conservative	2010
Rachel Reeves	Leeds West	Labour	2010
Naz Shah	Bradford West	Labour	2015
Barry Sheerman	Huddersfield	Labour Co-op	1983
Alec Shelbrooke	Elmet and Rothwell	Conservative	2010
Julian Smith	Skipton and Ripon	Conservative	2010
Alex Sobel	Leeds North West	Labour Co-op	2017
Alexander Stafford	Rother Valley	Conservative	2019
Graham Stuart	Beverley and Holderness	Conservative	2005
Julian Sturdy	York Outer	Conservative	2010
Rishi Sunak	Richmond (Yorks)	Conservative	2015
Jon Trickett	Hemsworth	Labour	1996 by-election
Karl Turner	Kingston upon Hull East	Labour	2010
Martin Vickers	Cleethorpes	Conservative	2010
Craig Whittaker	Calder Valley	Conservative	2010
Rosie Winterton	Doncaster Central	Labour	1997

== By-elections ==
- 2021 Batley and Spen by-election
- 2021 Chesham and Amersham by-election
- 2021 Hartlepool by-election
- 2021 North Shropshire by-election
- 2021 Old Bexley and Sidcup by-election
- 2022 Birmingham Erdington by-election
- 2022 City of Chester by-election
- 2022 Southend West by-election
- 2022 Stretford and Urmston by-election
- 2022 Tiverton and Honiton by-election
- 2022 Wakefield by-election
- 2023 Mid Bedfordshire by-election
- 2023 Selby and Ainsty by-election
- 2023 Tamworth by-election
- 2023 Uxbridge and South Ruislip by-election
- 2023 West Lancashire by-election
- 2024 Blackpool South by-election
- 2024 Kingswood by-election
- 2024 Rochdale by-election
- 2024 Wellingborough by-election

== See also ==
- 2019 United Kingdom general election in England
- List of MPs elected in the 2019 United Kingdom general election
- List of MPs for constituencies in Northern Ireland (2019–2024)
- List of MPs for constituencies in Scotland (2019–2024)
- List of MPs for constituencies in Wales (2019–2024)
