= List of MPs for constituencies in Northern Ireland (2019–2024) =

← 2017	12 December 2019	2024 →
- Colours on map indicate the party allegiance of each constituency's MP

This is a list of members of Parliament (MPs) elected to the House of Commons of the United Kingdom by Northern Irish constituencies for the 58th Parliament of the United Kingdom (2019–2024). There are 18 such constituencies, nine of which are represented by Nationalists and eight by Unionists. There is also one Alliance Party MP who does not identify as nationalist or unionist. It includes both MPs elected, held on 12 December 2019.

The list is sorted by the name of the MP, and MPs who did not serve throughout the Parliament are italicised. New MPs elected since the general election are noted at the bottom of the page.

Sinn Féin MPs follow an abstentionist policy of not taking their seats in the House of Commons.

== 2019 election results ==
Party	Seats	Seatshare (%)	Voteshare (%)
Democratic Unionist Party	8	44.44	30.6
Sinn Féin	7	38.88	22.8
Alliance Party	1	5.55	16.8
Social Democratic and Labour Party	2	11.11	14.9
Ulster Unionist Party	0	0	11.7
Total	18	100	96.8

== Composition ==
Affiliation	Members
Democratic Unionist Party	7
Sinn Féin	7
Social Democratic and Labour Party	2
Alliance Party	1
Independent Unionist	1
Total	18

Number of seats by party
1. DUP 38.89 (38.9%)
2. Sinn Féin 38.89 (38.9%)
3. SDLP 11.11 (11.1%)
4. Alliance 5.56 (5.56%)
5. Ind U 5.56 (5.56%)

== MPs ==
MP	Constituency	Party	In constituency since	Majority	Majority (%)
Órfhlaith Begley	West Tyrone	Sinn Féin	2018 by-election	7,478	18.2
Mickey Brady	Newry and Armagh	Sinn Féin	2015	9,287	18.3
Gregory Campbell	East Londonderry	DUP	2001	9,607	24.4
Sir Jeffrey Donaldson	Lagan Valley	Ind. Unionist (Note: Donaldson's Democratic Unionist membership and whip were suspended in March 2024 and he sat as an independent.)	1997	6,499	14.3
Colum Eastwood	Foyle	SDLP	2019	17,110	36.3
Stephen Farry	North Down	Alliance	2019	2,968	7.3
John Finucane	Belfast North	Sinn Féin	2019	1,943	4.0
Michelle Gildernew	Fermanagh and South Tyrone	Sinn Féin	2001 (Note: Gildernew was defeated in the 2015 election and re-entered the House in the 2017 election.)	57	0.11
Paul Girvan	South Antrim	DUP	2017	2,689	6.3
Claire Hanna	Belfast South	SDLP	2019	15,401	32.5
Chris Hazzard	South Down	Sinn Féin	2017	1,620	3.2
Carla Lockhart	Upper Bann	DUP	2019	8,210	16.4
Paul Maskey	Belfast West	Sinn Féin	2011 by-election	14,672	37.8
Francie Molloy	Mid Ulster	Sinn Féin	2013 by-election	9,537	21.4
Ian Paisley Jr	North Antrim	DUP	2010	12,721	28.9
Gavin Robinson	Belfast East	DUP	2015	1,819	4.3
Jim Shannon	Strangford	DUP	2010	7,071	18.8
Sammy Wilson	East Antrim	DUP	2005	6,716	18.0

== See also ==
- 2019 United Kingdom general election in Northern Ireland
- List of MPs elected in the 2019 United Kingdom general election
- List of MPs for constituencies in England (2019–2024)
- List of MPs for constituencies in Scotland (2019–2024)
- List of MPs for constituencies in Wales (2019–2024)
