= List of MPs for constituencies in Northern Ireland (2024–present) =

- 4 July 2024
- Colours on map indicate the party allegiance of each constituency's MP on the day of the 2024 UK election

This is a list of members of Parliament (MPs) elected to the House of Commons of the United Kingdom by Northern Irish constituencies for the 59th Parliament of the United Kingdom (2024–present). There are 18 such constituencies, nine of which are represented by Nationalists and eight by Unionists. There is also one Alliance Party MP who does not identify as nationalist or unionist.

The list is sorted by the name of the MP, and MPs who did not serve throughout the Parliament are italicised. New MPs elected since the general election are noted at the bottom of the page.

Sinn Féin MPs follow an abstentionist policy of not taking their seats in the House of Commons.

== 2024 election results ==
Party	Seats	Seatshare (%)	Voteshare (%)
Sinn Féin	7	38.9%	27.0%
Democratic Unionist Party	5	27.8%	22.1%
Social Democratic and Labour Party	2	11.1%	11.1%
Alliance Party	1	5.6%	15.0%
Ulster Unionist Party	1	5.6%	12.2%
Traditional Unionist Voice	1	5.6%	6.2%
Independent politician	1	5.6%	3.0%
Total	18	100	96.6%

== Composition ==
Affiliation	Members
Sinn Féin	7
Democratic Unionist Party	4
Social Democratic and Labour Party	2
Alliance Party	1
Ulster Unionist Party	1
Traditional Unionist Voice	1
Independent Unionist	2
Total	18

Number of seats by party
1. Sinn Féin (38.9%)
2. DUP (22.2%)
3. SDLP (11.1%)
4. Alliance (5.56%)
5. Ind U (11.1%)
6. UUP (5.56%)
7. TUV (5.56%)

== MPs ==
MP	Constituency	Party	In constituency since	Majority	Majority (%)
Órfhlaith Begley	West Tyrone	Sinn Féin	2018 by-election	15,917	36.5%
Dáire Hughes	Newry and Armagh	Sinn Féin	2024	15,493	33.7%
Gregory Campbell	East Londonderry	DUP	2001	179	0.5%
Sorcha Eastwood	Lagan Valley	Alliance	2024	2,959	6.0%
Colum Eastwood	Foyle	SDLP	2019	4,166	10.9%
Alex Easton	North Down	Ind. Unionist	2024	7,305	16.8%
John Finucane	Belfast North	Sinn Féin	2019	5,612	13.9%
Pat Cullen	Fermanagh and South Tyrone	Sinn Féin	2024	4,571	8.9%
Robin Swann	South Antrim	UUP	2024	7,512	17.5%
Claire Hanna	Belfast South and Mid Down	SDLP	2019	12,506	28.8%
Chris Hazzard	South Down	Sinn Féin	2017	9,280	20.5%
Carla Lockhart	Upper Bann	Ind. Unionist	2019	7,406	15.6%
Paul Maskey	Belfast West	Sinn Féin	2011 by-election	15,961	40.2%
Cathal Mallaghan	Mid Ulster	Sinn Féin	2024	14,923	32.8%
Jim Allister	North Antrim	TUV	2024	450	1.1%
Gavin Robinson	Belfast East	DUP	2015	2,676	6.2%
Jim Shannon	Strangford	DUP	2010	5,131	13.2%
Sammy Wilson	East Antrim	DUP	2005	1,305	3.3%
