= List of MPs for constituencies in Scotland (2019–2024) =

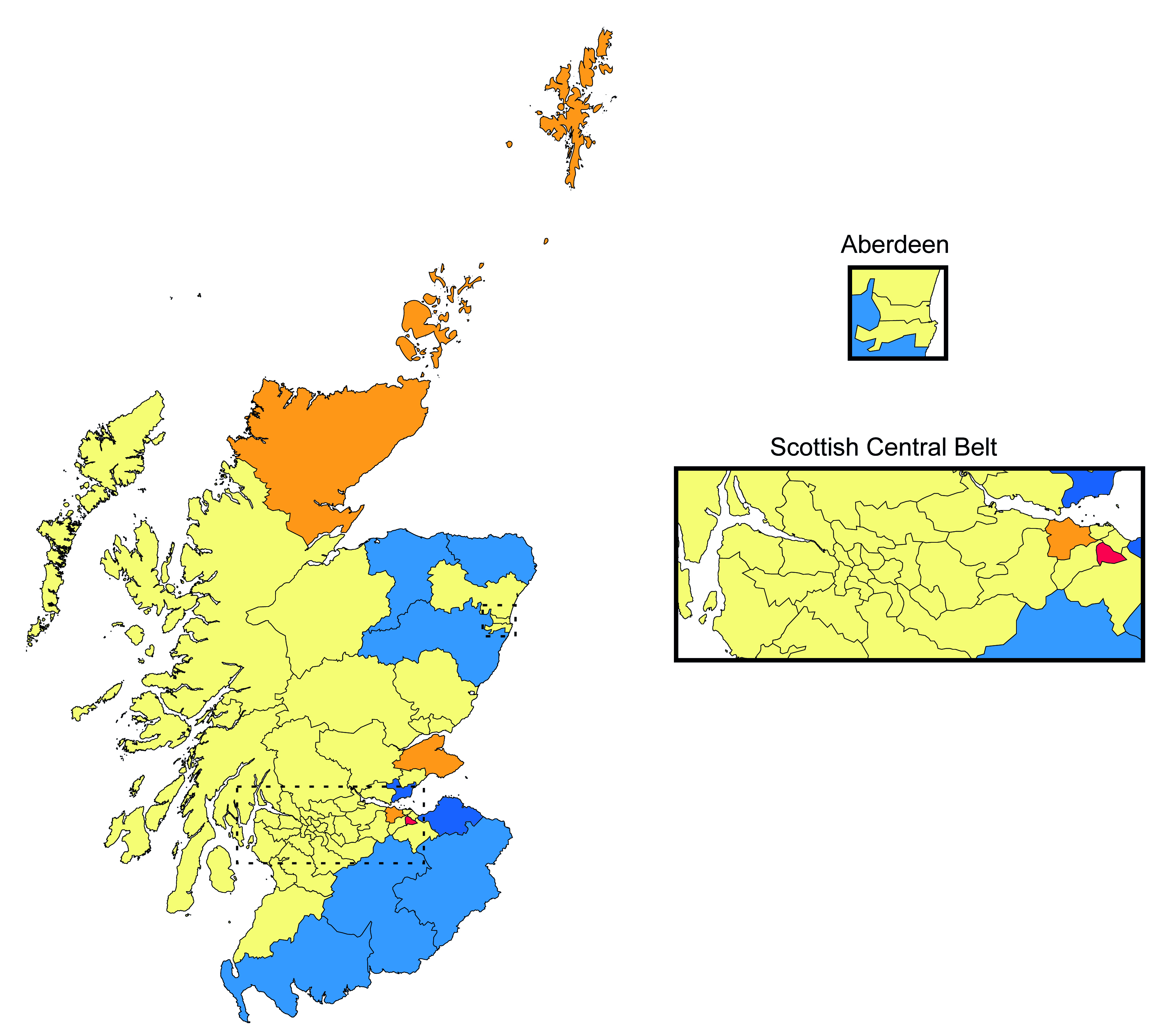
- Colours on map indicate the party allegiance of each constituency's MP.

This is a list of members of Parliament (MPs) elected to the House of Commons of the United Kingdom by Scottish constituencies at the 2019 United Kingdom general election for the 58th Parliament of the United Kingdom (2019–2024).

The list is sorted by the name of the MP. Changes of affiliation are noted at the bottom of the page. MPs who did not serve throughout the Parliament are italicised.

== Composition ==
Affiliation	Members (before GE 2024)	Seatshare (before GE 2024)	Voteshare (GE 2019)
Scottish National Party	43	72.8%	45.0%
Scottish Conservatives	7	11.9%	25.1%
Scottish Liberal Democrats	4	6.8%	9.5%
Alba Party	2	3.4%	N/A
Scottish Labour	2	3.4%	18.6%
Independent	1 (Note: Elected as a SNP candidate in 2019.)	1.7%	0.9%
Total	59		

Voteshare from the 2019 general election by party
1. SNP (45%)
2. Conservatives (25.1%)
3. Labour (18.6%)
4. Lib Dems (9.5%)
5. Other (1.8%)
Current seatshare by party
1. SNP (72.8%)
2. Conservatives (11.9%)
3. Lib Dems (6.8%)
4. Labour (3.4%)
5. Alba (3.4%)
6. Independent (1.7%)

== MPs ==
MP	Constituency	Party	In constituency since	Majority	Majority (%)
Hannah Bardell	Livingston	SNP	2015	13,435	24.6
Mhairi Black	Paisley and Renfrewshire South	SNP	2015	10,679	24.8
Ian Blackford	Ross, Skye & Lochaber	SNP	2015	9,443	23.7
Kirsty Blackman	Aberdeen North	SNP	2015	12,670	33.9
Steven Bonnar	Coatbridge, Chryston and Bellshill	SNP	2019	5,624	11.7
Andrew Bowie	West Aberdeenshire and Kincardine	Conservative	2017	843	1.6
Deidre Brock	Edinburgh North & Leith	SNP	2015	12,808	21.6
Alan Brown	Kilmarnock and Loudoun	SNP	2015	12,659	26.5
Amy Callaghan	East Dunbartonshire	SNP	2019	149	0.3
Lisa Cameron	East Kilbride, Strathaven and Lesmahagow	Conservative (Note: Cameron defected to the Scottish Conservatives from the SNP on 12 October 2023.)	2015	13,322	23.6
Alistair Carmichael	Orkney and Shetland	Liberal Democrats	2001	2,507	10.8
Wendy Chamberlain	North East Fife	Liberal Democrats	2019	1,316	2.9
Douglas Chapman	Dunfermline and West Fife	SNP	2015	10,699	20.0
Joanna Cherry	Edinburgh South West	SNP	2015	11,982	24.6
Ronnie Cowan	Inverclyde	SNP	2015	7,512	18.9
Angela Crawley	Lanark and Hamilton East	SNP	2015	5,187	9.8
Martyn Day	Linlithgow and East Falkirk	SNP	2015	11,266	19.5
Martin Docherty-Hughes	West Dunbartonshire	SNP	2015	9,553	21.1
Dave Doogan	Angus	SNP	2019	3,795	8.8
Allan Dorans	Ayr, Carrick and Cumnock	SNP	2019	2,329	5.0
David Duguid	Banff and Buchan	Conservative	2017	4,118	9.7
Marion Fellows	Motherwell and Wishaw	SNP	2015	6,268	14.1
Margaret Ferrier	Rutherglen and Hamilton West	Independent (Note: Ferrier was suspended from the SNP in October 2020 and sat as an independent. She vacated her seat following a recall petition on 1 August 2023.)	2019	5,230	9.7
Stephen Flynn	Aberdeen South	SNP	2019	3,982	8.7
Patricia Gibson	North Ayrshire and Arran	SNP	2015	8,521	17.7
Patrick Grady	Glasgow North	SNP	2015	5,601	15.5
Peter Grant	Glenrothes	SNP	2015	11,757	28.3
Neil Gray	Airdrie and Shotts	SNP (Note: Gray resigned as an MP on 23 March 2021 to successfully contest the Scottish Parliament constituency of the same name at the 2021 Scottish Parliament election.)	2015	5,201	13.1
Neale Hanvey	Kirkcaldy and Cowdenbeath	Alba (Note: Hanvey defected to the Alba Party from the SNP on 27 March 2021.)	2019	1,243	2.6
Drew Hendry	Inverness, Nairn, Badenoch and Strathspey	SNP	2015	10,440	19.1
Stewart Hosie	Dundee East	SNP	2005	13,375	29.5
Alister Jack	Dumfries and Galloway	Conservative	2017	1,805	3.5
Christine Jardine	Edinburgh West	Liberal Democrats	2017	3,769	6.9
John Lamont	Berwickshire, Roxburgh and Selkirk	Conservative	2017	5,148	9.7
Chris Law	Dundee West	SNP	2015	12,259	29.5
David Linden	Glasgow East	SNP	2017	5,566	14.5
Kenny MacAskill	East Lothian	Alba (Note: MacAskill defected to the Alba Party from the SNP on 27 March 2021.)	2019	3,886	6.7
Angus MacNeil	Na h-Eileanan an Iar	Independent (Note: MacNeil was suspended from the SNP in July 2023 and expelled in August. He sat as an independent.)	2005	2,438	16.8
Stewart McDonald	Glasgow South	SNP	2015	9,005	19.0
Stuart McDonald	Cumbernauld, Kilsyth and Kirkintilloch East	SNP	2015	12,976	28.4
Anne McLaughlin	Glasgow North East	SNP	2019	2,548	7.5
John McNally	Falkirk	SNP	2015	14,948	26.7
Carol Monaghan	Glasgow North West	SNP	2015	8,539	21.0
David Mundell	Dumfriesshire, Clydesdale and Tweeddale	Conservative	2005	3,781	7.7
Ian Murray	Edinburgh South	Labour	2010	11,095	22.3
Gavin Newlands	Paisley and Renfrewshire North	SNP	2015	11,902	24.0
John Nicolson	Ochil and South Perthshire	SNP	2019	4,498	7.8
Brendan O'Hara	Argyll and Bute	SNP	2015	4,110	8.6
Kirsten Oswald	East Renfrewshire	SNP	2019	5,426	9.8
Anum Qaisar	Airdrie and Shotts	SNP	2021 by-election	1,757	8.0
Douglas Ross	Moray	Conservative	2017	513	1.1
Michael Shanks	Rutherglen and Hamilton West	Labour	2023 by-election	9,446	31.0
Tommy Sheppard	Edinburgh East	SNP	2015	10,417	21.7
Alyn Smith	Stirling	SNP	2019	9,254	17.6
Chris Stephens	Glasgow South West	SNP	2015	4,900	13.3
Jamie Stone	Caithness, Sutherland and Easter Ross	Liberal Democrats	2017	204	0.6
Alison Thewliss	Glasgow Central	SNP	2015	6,474	16.1
Owen Thompson	Midlothian	SNP	2019	5,705	11.8
Richard Thomson	Gordon	SNP	2019	819	1.4
Philippa Whitford	Central Ayrshire	SNP	2015	5,304	11.4
Pete Wishart	Perth and North Perthshire	SNP	2001	7,550	14.0

== By-elections ==
- 2021 Airdrie and Shotts by-election
- 2023 Rutherglen and Hamilton West by-election

== See also ==
- 2019 United Kingdom general election in Scotland
- List of MPs elected in the 2019 United Kingdom general election
- List of MPs for constituencies in England (2019–2024)
- List of MPs for constituencies in Northern Ireland (2019–2024)
- List of MPs for constituencies in Wales (2019–2024)
