= Cheryl Gillan =

British politician (1952–2021)

The Right Honourable Dame Cheryl Gillan DBE
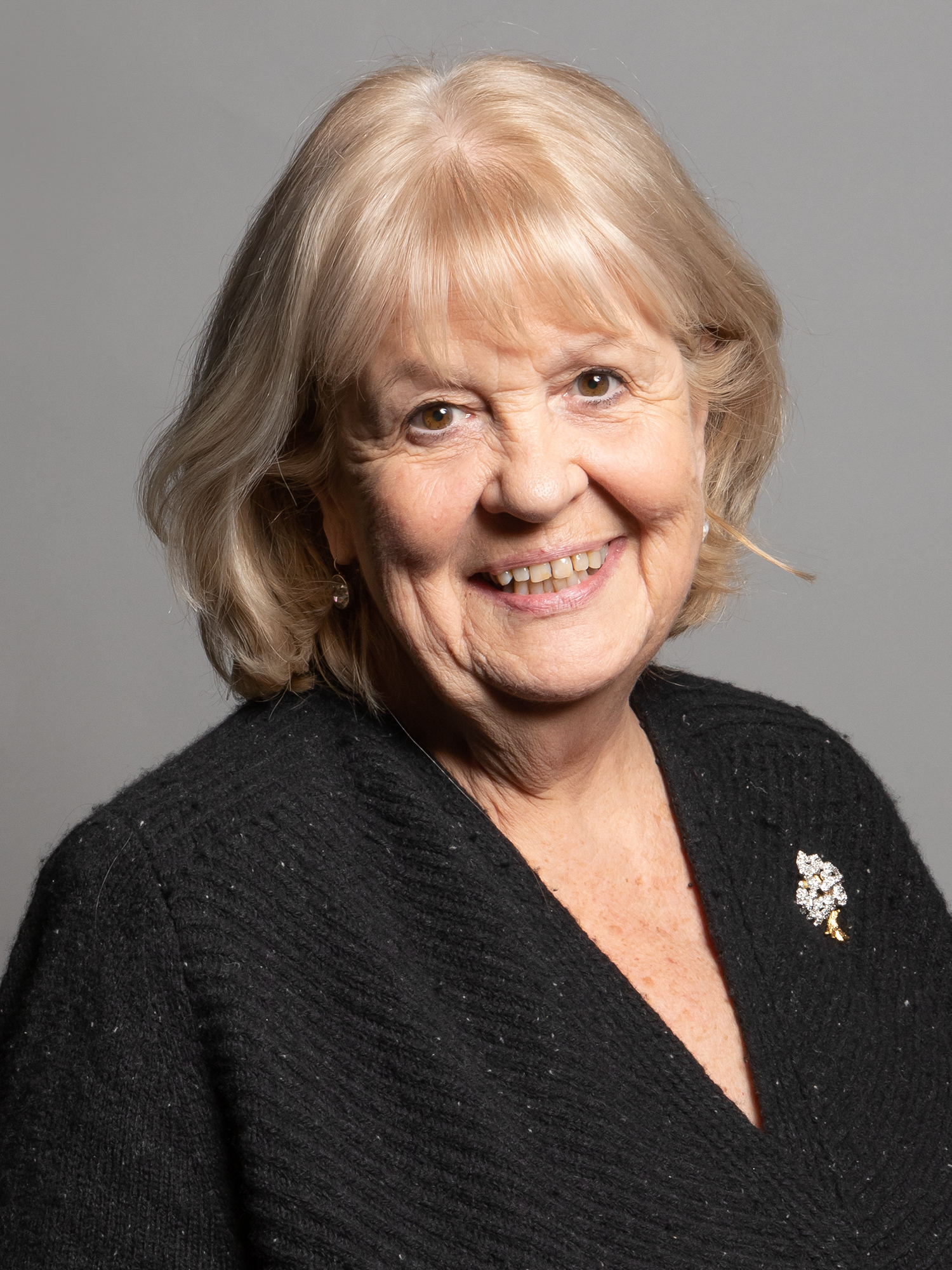
- Official portrait, 2020

Chair of the 1922 Committee
- Acting; 24 May 2019 – 3 September 2019 Serving with Charles Walker
- Leader: Theresa May; Boris Johnson
- Preceded by: Graham Brady
- Succeeded by: Graham Brady

Secretary of State for Wales
- In office 12 May 2010 – 4 September 2012
- Prime Minister: David Cameron
- Preceded by: Peter Hain
- Succeeded by: David Jones

Shadow Secretary of State for Wales
- In office 8 December 2005 – 11 May 2010
- Leader: David Cameron
- Preceded by: Bill Wiggin
- Succeeded by: Peter Hain

Parliamentary Under-Secretary of State for Education and Employment
- In office 6 July 1995 – 2 May 1997
- Prime Minister: John Major
- Preceded by: Tim Boswell
- Succeeded by: Estelle Morris

Member of Parliament for Chesham and Amersham
- In office 9 April 1992 – 4 April 2021
- Preceded by: Ian Gilmour
- Succeeded by: Sarah Green

Personal details
- Born: Cheryl Elise Kendall Gillan; 21 April 1952 Cardiff, Wales
- Died: 4 April 2021 (aged 68) Esher, Surrey, England
- Party: Conservative
- Spouse: Jack Leeming (m. 1985; died 2019)
- Education: Cheltenham Ladies' College
- Alma mater: College of Law
- Website: Official website

Dame Cheryl Elise Kendall Gillan DBE (/ˈɡɪlən/; 21 April 1952 – 4 April 2021) was a British politician who served as Member of Parliament (MP) for Chesham and Amersham from 1992 until her death in 2021. A member of the Conservative Party, she served as Secretary of State for Wales from 2010 to 2012.

Before her parliamentary career, Gillan was a marketing executive for several companies. She was first elected to the House of Commons in 1992 and served as an MP for 29 years. She was a junior minister for Education and Employment from 1995 to 1997 in John Major's government. In opposition, she served as a Conservative whip and as a spokesperson for Trade and Industry, foreign affairs and home affairs. She was the Shadow Welsh Secretary from 2005 to 2010. She served in David Cameron's cabinet as Secretary of State for Wales after the 2010 general election until a reshuffle in September 2012. She was awarded a damehood in the 2018 New Year Honours.

== Early life ==
Cheryl Elise Kendall Gillan was born in Llandaff, a district of Cardiff, on 21 April 1952. Her father, Major Adam Mitchell Gillan, was a former British Army officer and a director of a steel company, while her mother, Mona Elsie Freeman, was a Wren. She was brought up in South Wales and her family farms near Usk. She was educated at Elm Tree House and Norfolk House primary schools in Cardiff before her family left Wales when she was aged 11. Gillan attended the independent Cheltenham Ladies' College and the College of Law. She was a member of the Chartered Institute of Marketing.

== Business career ==
Gillan joined the International Management Group in 1977 before becoming a director with the British Film Year in 1984. In 1986, she was appointed a senior marketing consultant at Ernst & Young before becoming a marketing director with Kidsons Impey from 1991 to 1993. She became a Freeman of the City of London in 1991 and was a member of the Livery of the Worshipful Company of Marketors.

== Political career ==
Gillan was chairman of the Bow Group from 1987 to 1988. She unsuccessfully contested the Greater Manchester Central seat in the 1989 European Parliament election. She was elected to the House of Commons in the 1992 general election for the Buckinghamshire seat of Chesham and Amersham. She won the seat with a majority of 22,220 and remained the MP until her death. She made her maiden speech on 25 June 1992.

In her early years in Parliament, Gillan served on the select committees for Science and Technology (1992–1995) and for Procedure (1994–1995). She was also the Secretary to the All Party Parliamentary Group on Space and a board member of the Parliamentary Office of Science and Technology in 1995. In 1994, she was appointed parliamentary private secretary to the Leader of the House of Lords and Lord Privy Seal, Viscount Cranborne.

In July 1995, Gillan joined the government as a Parliamentary Under-Secretary of State in the Department for Education and Employment. In this role, she expanded the specialist schools programme to include Arts and Sports colleges, something she considered to be one of her proudest achievements in politics. After the 1997 general election – with the Conservative Party now in Opposition – she became a spokesperson for Trade and Industry as well as for education in June 1997 (with there being so few Conservative frontbenchers left that several held more than one shadow post). During this time, she opposed the abolition of the Assisted Places Scheme. From June 1998, shadow minister for Foreign and Commonwealth Affairs and International Development. From September 2001 until June 2003, she served in the whip's office. In December 2003, she became a shadow minister for Home, Constitutional and Legal Affairs.

Gillan represented the British Islands and the Mediterranean on the Executive Committee of the Commonwealth Parliamentary Association (CPA) from 2000 until 2003 and was later elected treasurer of the CPA from 2003 until 2006. She was a member of the Parliamentary Association of NATO from 2003 to 2005.

She was the chair of the All-Party Parliamentary Group on Autism, and responsible for introducing the Autism Act 2009 through a Private Member's Bill.

=== Shadow Welsh Secretary (2005–2010) ===
Gillan was promoted to the Shadow Cabinet in December 2005 as Shadow Secretary of State for Wales. She was initially opposed to the creation of the National Assembly for Wales, saying that there was not a large enough majority in favour of it in the 1997 Welsh devolution referendum. However, after becoming Shadow Welsh Secretary, she declared that she supported the Welsh Assembly, and had maintained the possibility of the Conservatives supporting the devolution of additional powers. She said in 2008, however, that the Conservative Party was divided on the issue of devolution and criticised the state of devolution in Wales as being "complex and cumbersome".

=== Welsh Secretary (2010–2012) ===
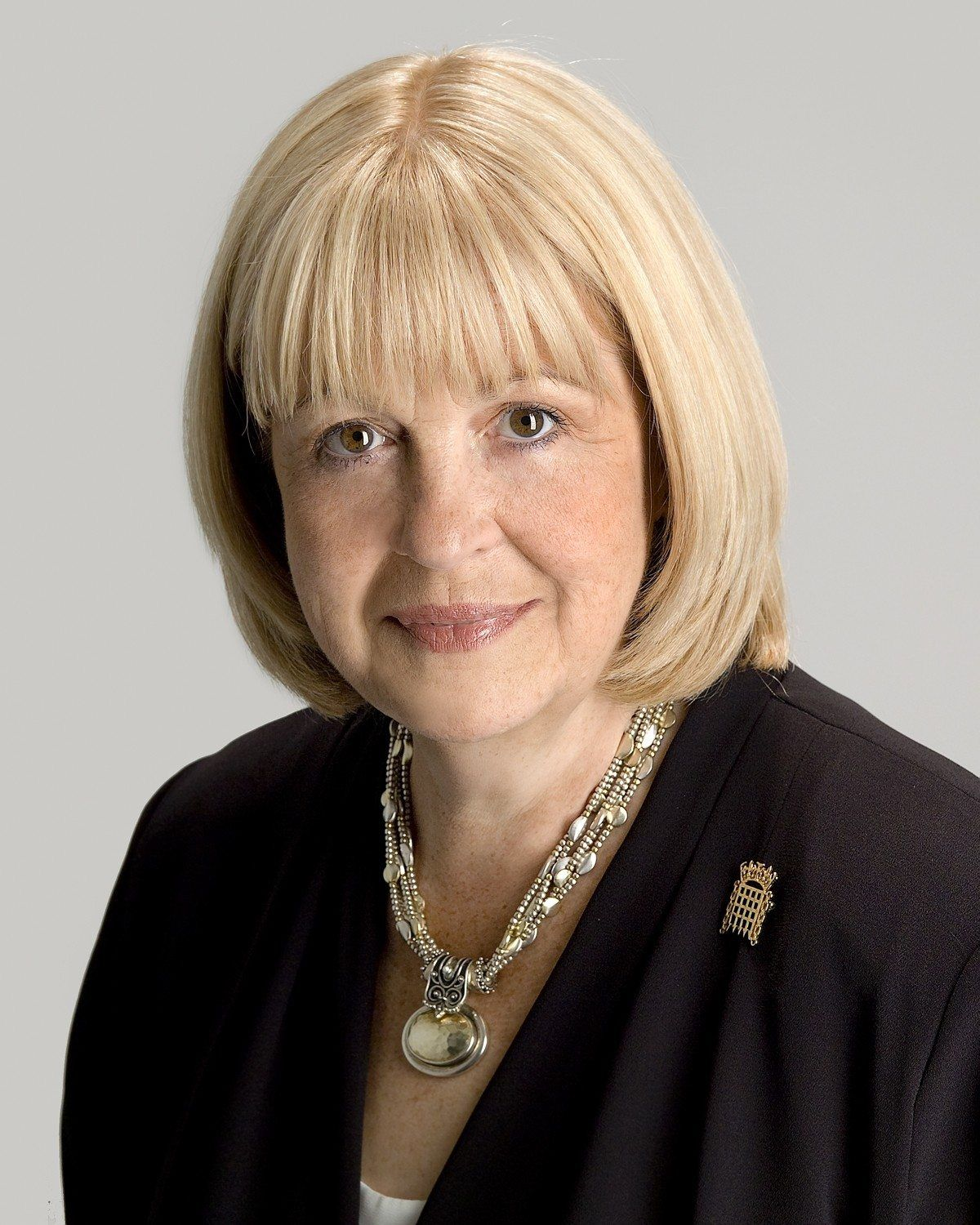
Official portrait, 2010

Gillan was appointed by David Cameron as Secretary of State for Wales in the new coalition government formed from the 2010 general election. She was appointed a Privy Councillor on 13 May 2010.

As Secretary of State for Wales, her aides included:

- Parliamentary Private Secretary: Glyn Davies MP
- Special adviser: Richard Hazlewood

Welsh-related government policy decisions taken during Gillan's term in the Wales Office included:

- the running of the 2011 Welsh devolution referendum on direct law-making powers for the Assembly;
- setting up of the Silk Commission on future Welsh devolution;
- rail electrification of the South Wales Main Line branch of the Great Western Main Line;
- reduction of S4C funding;
- cancellation of the plan to centralise military training at MOD St Athan.

In May 2012, Gillan unveiled a Wales Office green paper that proposed to cut the number of constituency Assembly members (AMs) from 40 to 30, with another 30 coming from regional lists. The Welsh Government opposed this idea, and it was reported that Conservative AMs preferred the status quo.

Gillan ceased to be Welsh Secretary following a major Cabinet reshuffle on 4 September 2012, although she wished to continue in the role. She was replaced by David Jones who had been Parliamentary Under-Secretary of State for Wales; there had been pressure from Welsh Conservative MPs, AMs and activists for her successor to be an MP from a Welsh constituency.

=== High Speed 2 ===
Gillan strongly opposed the High Speed 2 (HS2) railway project. Gillan's constituency lay on the proposed route for the rail line. In a parliamentary debate before the 2010 election, Gillan said that she agreed with neighbouring MP David Lidington who described the planned route as an "outrage". When campaigning for re-election, Gillan said that HS2 would be "a lot more than just the blight on the properties nearby... the implications for the area will be absolutely phenomenal". She also described HS2 as a project that would "threaten the quality of our lives – not just now but for generations to come" and stated that she "would defy the party whip – be very, very sure of that".

On 12 January 2012, Secretary of State for Transport Justine Greening confirmed in a House of Commons statement that HS2 would go ahead and, in responding to questions, stated that it was her understanding that "the Welsh Secretary is already on side ... I thoroughly agree with her [Gillan] that we have ended up with the right line, with the right mitigation". In an interview with the Bucks Free Press following the announcement, Gillan stated: "[W]e've already got some changes, good changes and I'm looking at what further possibilities there will be". When asked whether she would remain in the Cabinet, Gillan stated: "I am not resigning. The speculation on my resignation has always come from the press and my political opponents... I'm exceedingly loyal to my party and my Government and I will remain so".

Three days after the announcement, it was discovered that Gillan had sold her house – less than a mile from the proposed route – in November 2011 because she and her husband, John, had "mobility problems". Following the revelations, Labour called for Gillan to be investigated for a possible breach of the Ministerial Code.

=== 1922 Committee ===
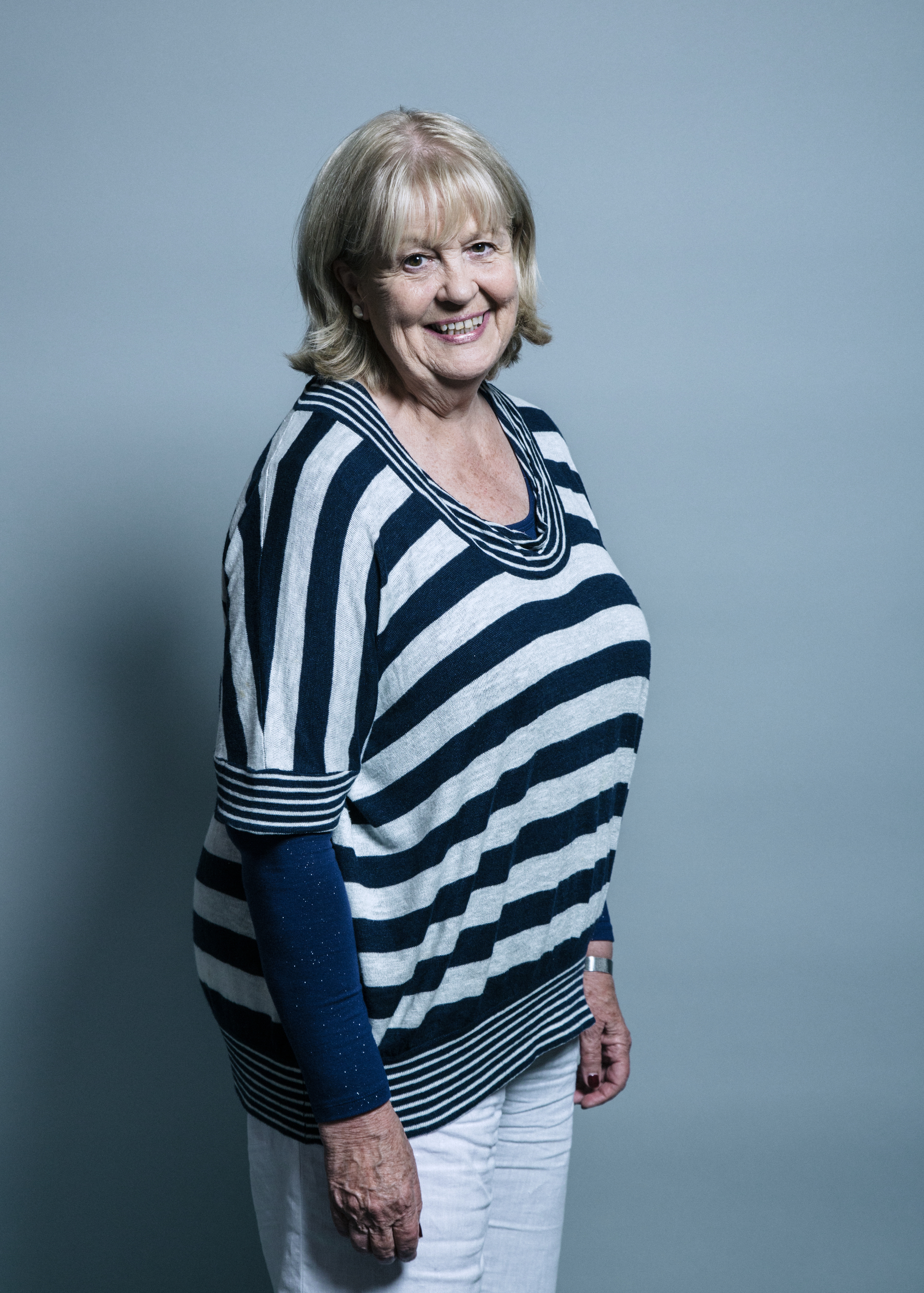
Parliamentary portrait by Chris McAndrew, 2017

In May 2019, Gillan and Charles Walker became acting chairs of the 1922 Committee after Graham Brady resigned from the role while mulling a Conservative leadership bid. They stood down when Brady returned to the position in September of that year.

== Expenses ==
In 2009, Gillan was criticised for her expenses claims. The Daily Telegraph revealed she had claimed for dog food on her second home allowance. Gillan described the claim as a "mistake" and said she would be repaying it. Gillan also claimed £305.50 to cure "noise problems" with her boiler. When questioned, Gillan said the boiler had broken down, and the claim was within the rules. It was also revealed that Gillan had attempted to claim more money for her gas bill than it was worth; the Commons Fees Office refused to pay the full amount.

Gillan was also the subject of criticism from the Bucks Free Press in 2010, which revealed Gillan had claimed £8,450 for food and £4,335 for cleaning. It was also revealed that Gillan employed her husband, then aged 82, as an "Office Manager/Researcher". Gillan wrote to the Bucks Free Press to complain that "insinuating language" had been used. Following a review of MPs expenses by Sir Thomas Legg, Gillan was also found to have claimed £1,884 more than her mortgage bill was actually worth. The mortgage was on a second home in Battersea, even though, at the time, she had a home in her constituency, which lies on the London Underground network. Gillan was ordered to repay the money. On 30 March 2010, it was announced that future MPs from Gillan's constituency would not be allowed to claim for a second home after the 2010 election.

== Personal life ==
Gillan was married to John Coates "Jack" Leeming from 1985 until his death, aged 91, on 23 March 2019. Her interests included singing (she was a member of the Parliamentary Choir), gardening, golf and keeping chickens. Before her death, Gillan lived in Epsom, Surrey. She was a member of the Royal Automobile Club.

During the COVID-19 pandemic, Gillan became one of many MPs who participated virtually and pushed for reforms to allow electronic voting for members unable to sit in the chamber, especially when she became too ill to attend due to endometrial cancer. She died in an Esher hospital on 4 April 2021, at the age of 68. Tributes were paid to her in the House of Commons on 13 April. In the subsequent by-election held on 17 June, her former seat was gained by Sarah Green of the Liberal Democrats.

Parliament of the United Kingdom
Preceded by Ian Gilmour	Member of Parliament for Chesham and Amersham; 1992–2021	Succeeded by Sarah Green
Political offices
Preceded by Bill Wiggin	Shadow Secretary of State for Wales; 2005–2010	Succeeded by Peter Hain
Preceded by Peter Hain	Secretary of State for Wales; 2010–2012	Succeeded by David Jones
