= List of MPs for constituencies in Wales (2019–2024) =

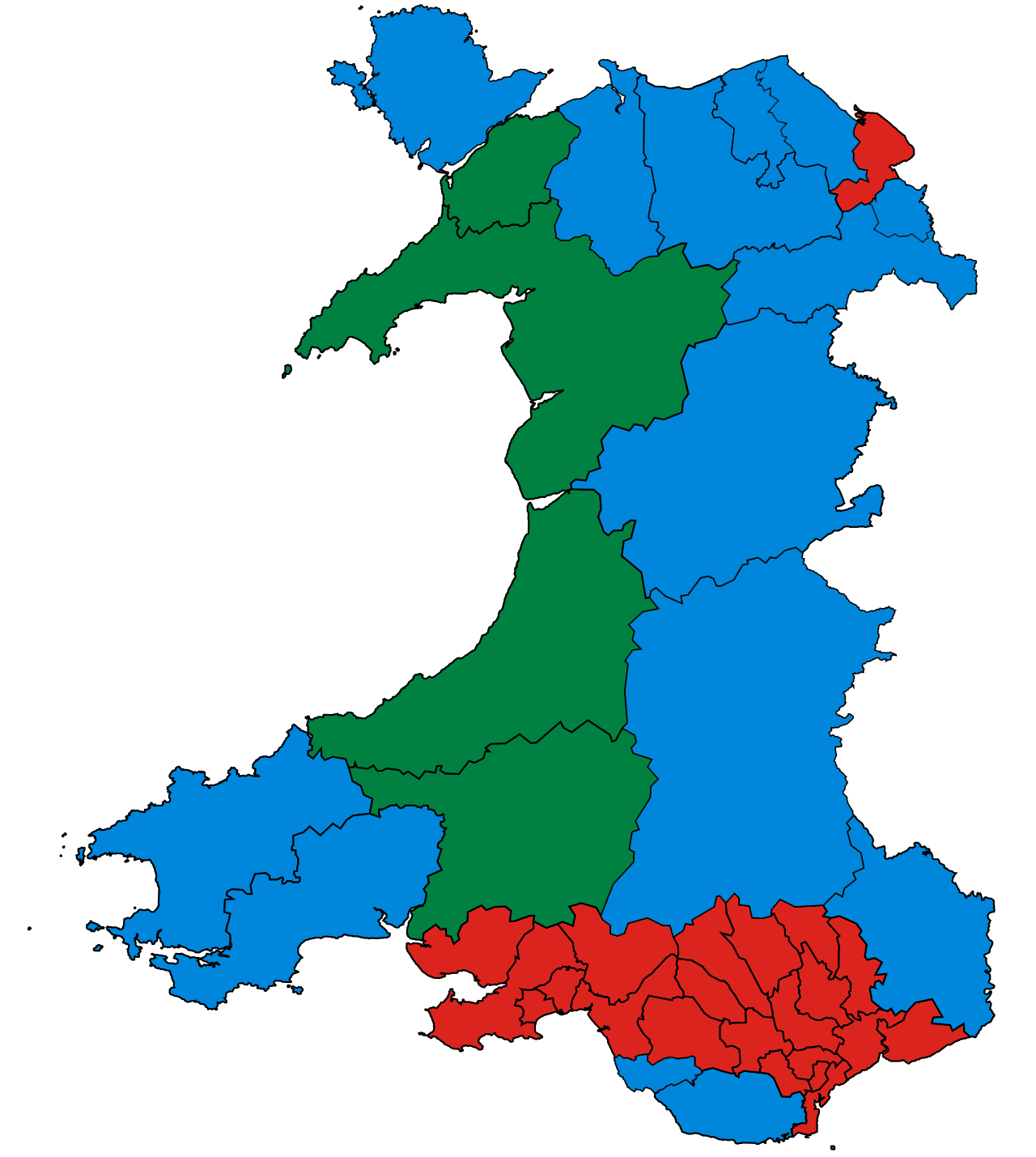
- Colours on map indicate the party allegiance of each constituency's MP on the day of the election

This is a list of members of Parliament (MPs) elected to the House of Commons of the United Kingdom by Welsh constituencies for the fifty-eighth Parliament of the United Kingdom (2019–2024).

It includes both MPs elected at the 2019 general election, held on 12 December 2019, and those subsequently elected in by-elections.

The list is sorted by the name of the MP, and MPs who did not serve throughout the Parliament are italicised. New MPs elected since the general election are noted at the bottom of the page.

== Composition ==
Affiliation	Members
Labour Party	21
Conservative Party	13
Plaid Cymru	3
Independent	3
Total	40

Number of seats by party (at election)
1. Labour (57%)
2. Conservative (35%)
3. Plaid Cymru (8%)

== MPs ==
MP	Constituency	Party	In constituency since	Majority	Majority (%)
Tonia Antoniazzi	Gower	Labour	2017	1,837	4.1
Sarah Atherton	Wrexham	Conservative	2019	2,131	6.3
Simon Baynes	Clwyd South	Conservative	2019	1,239	3.4
Kevin Brennan	Cardiff West	Labour	2001	10,986	23.8
Chris Bryant	Rhondda	Labour	2001	11,440	38.6
Alun Cairns	Vale of Glamorgan	Conservative	2010	3,562	6.5
Stephen Crabb	Preseli Pembrokeshire	Conservative	2005	5,062	11.9
Virginia Crosbie	Ynys Môn	Conservative	2019	1,968	5.4
Wayne David	Caerphilly	Labour	2001	6,833	17.0
David Davies	Monmouth	Conservative	2005	9,982	19.9
Geraint Davies	Swansea West	Independent (Note: Davies's Labour whip was suspended in June 2023 and he sat as an independent.)	2010	8,116	22.6
James Davies	Vale of Clwyd	Conservative	2019	1,827	4.9
Alex Davies-Jones	Pontypridd	Labour	2019	5,890	15.1
Stephen Doughty	Cardiff South and Penarth	Labour Co-op	2012	12,737	25.1
Jonathan Edwards	Carmarthen East and Dinefwr	Independent (Note: Edwards was suspended from Plaid Cymru in June 2020 and sat as an independent. The whip was later restored, but he did not rejoin the Plaid group at Westminster.)	2010	1,809	4.4
Chris Elmore	Ogmore	Labour Co-op	2016	7,805	22.0
Chris Evans	Islwyn	Labour Co-op	2010	5,464	15.9
Nia Griffith	Llanelli	Labour	2005	4,670	12.2
Carolyn Harris	Swansea East	Labour	2015	7,970	23.7
Simon Hart	Carmarthen West and South Pembrokeshire	Conservative	2010	6,747	18.4
David Jones	Clwyd West	Conservative	2005	6,747	16.7
Fay Jones	Brecon and Radnorshire	Conservative	2019	7,131	17.2
Gerald Jones	Merthyr Tydfil and Rhymney	Labour	2015	10,606	32.8
Ruth Jones	Newport West	Labour	2019	902	2.1
Stephen Kinnock	Aberavon	Labour	2015	10,490	33.2
Ben Lake	Ceredigion	Plaid Cymru	2017	6,329	15.8
Anna McMorrin	Cardiff North	Labour	2017	6,982	13.3
Robin Millar	Aberconwy	Conservative	2019	2,034	6.4
Jessica Morden	Newport East	Labour	2005	1,992	5.4
Christina Rees	Neath	Labour	2015	5,637	15.3
Rob Roberts	Delyn	Independent (Note: Roberts was suspended from the Conservatives in May 2021 and reinstated to the party in November but the parliamentary whip was not restored. He sat as an independent.)	2019	865	2.3
Liz Saville Roberts	Dwyfor Meirionnydd	Plaid Cymru	2015	4,740	15.9
Nick Smith	Blaenau Gwent	Labour	2010	8,647	28.6
Jo Stevens	Cardiff Central	Labour	2015	17,179	41.1
Mark Tami	Alyn and Deeside	Labour	2001	213	0.5
Nick Thomas-Symonds	Torfaen	Labour	2015	3,742	10.0
Jamie Wallis	Bridgend	Conservative	2019	1,157	2.8
Craig Williams	Montgomeryshire	Conservative	2019	12,138	35.5
Hywel Williams	Arfon	Plaid Cymru	2001	2,781	9.6
Beth Winter	Cynon Valley	Labour	2019	8,822	29.2

== See also ==
- 2019 United Kingdom general election in Wales
- List of MPs elected in the 2019 United Kingdom general election
- List of MPs for constituencies in England (2019–2024)
- List of MPs for constituencies in Northern Ireland (2019–2024)
- List of MPs for constituencies in Scotland (2019–2024)
