= 2021 Chesham and Amersham by-election =

2021 UK parliament by-election

- 17 June 2021

Chesham and Amersham constituency
- Registered: 72,828
- Turnout: 52.1% (▼24.7 pp)
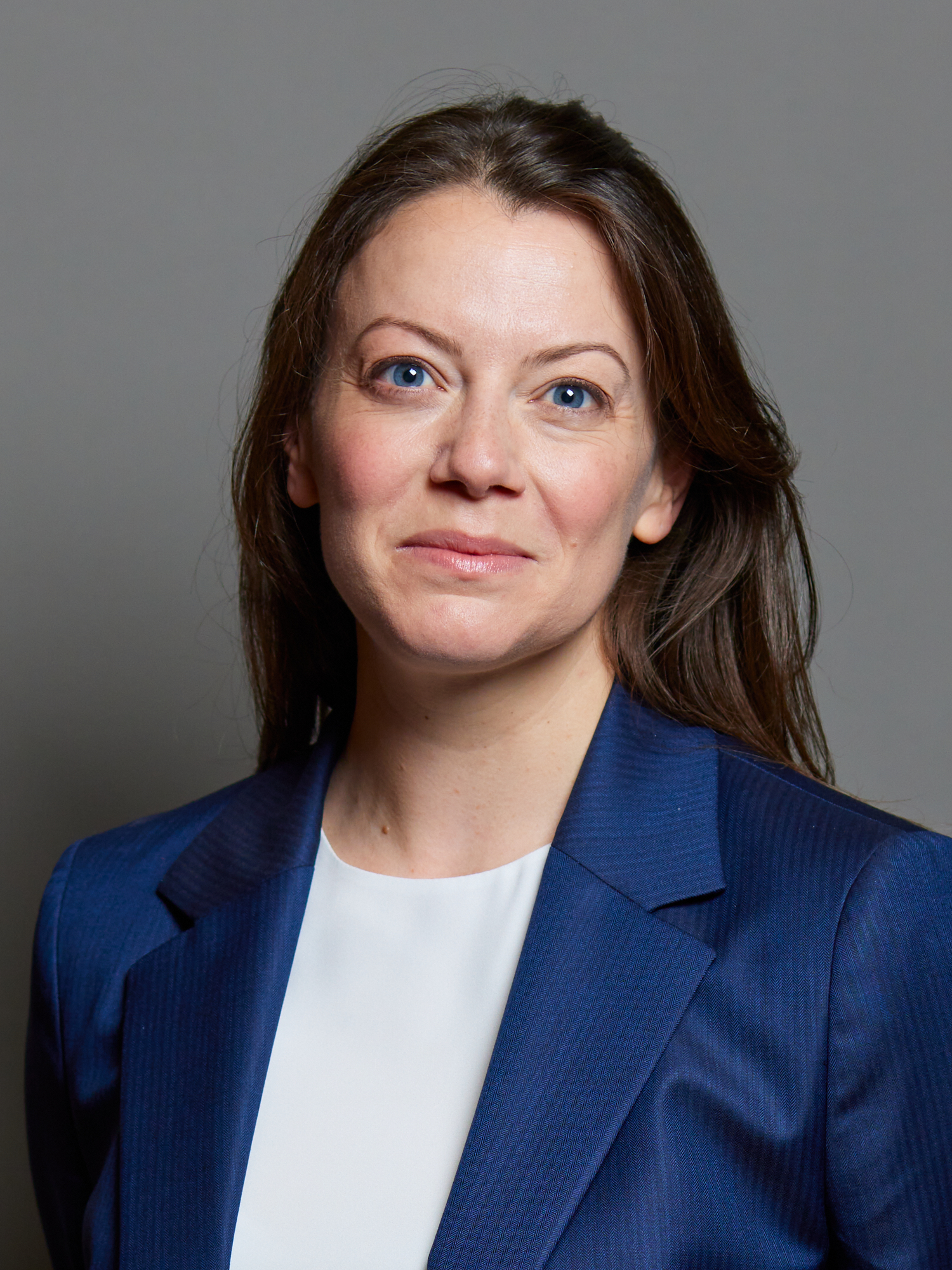
	First party	Second party
		Con
Candidate	Sarah Green	Peter Fleet
Party	Liberal Democrats	Conservative
Popular vote	21,517	13,489
Percentage	56.7%	35.5%
Swing	▲30.4 pp	▼19.9 pp
MP before election
Cheryl Gillan
Conservative
Elected MP
Sarah Green
Liberal Democrats

A by-election for the United Kingdom parliamentary constituency of Chesham and Amersham was held on 17 June 2021, following the death of incumbent Conservative Party MP Dame Cheryl Gillan. The Liberal Democrat candidate, Sarah Green, won the by-election with a swing from the Conservatives of 25.2%. This was the first time a non-Conservative candidate had won this seat since its formation in 1974.

This was the first of four by-elections the Liberal Democrats gained from the Conservatives in this parliament; they subsequently won the by-elections in North Shropshire, in December 2021, in Tiverton and Honiton, in June 2022, and in Somerton and Frome, in July 2023.

== Background ==
=== Cause ===
Dame Cheryl Gillan, the sitting Conservative Party member of Parliament (MP), died on 4 April 2021 at the age of 68. Gillan had served as MP for the constituency since 1992.

=== Constituency ===
Chesham and Amersham, named after the market towns of Chesham and Amersham in the constituency, was held by the Conservative Party since its creation at the February 1974 election until the by-election. The local authority is Buckinghamshire Council and the seat is coterminous with the abolished Chiltern District. The area is in the London commuter belt, and is home to many affluent professionals.

=== History ===
In June 2016, 55% of voters in the coterminous Chiltern District voted to remain in the European Union (EU) in the EU membership referendum. The estimated turnout of 83.6% was the highest figure for any constituency in the UK, with only Gibraltar reporting a higher percentage. At the 2019 European Parliament elections, the pro-EU Liberal Democrats were the most popular party in the Chiltern District with 31.9%, with the pro-Leave Brexit Party in second place with 30%. Despite the seat voting Remain, Gillan, a supporter of Brexit, was re-elected with over half the vote in both the general elections following the referendum. Following the 2019 election, it was the Liberal Democrats' 51st target going into the next election, requiring a swing of 14.6 to win.

== Campaign ==
=== Candidates ===
- Liberal Democrats – Sarah Green, a training and communications professional. Green was the party's candidate in Ynys Môn in the 2005 general election, coming fifth with 6.8% of the vote (while serving as Chair of MIDR Cymru (now Welsh Young Liberals)), and Arfon in North Wales in 2010, coming fourth, with 14.1% of the vote.
- Conservative Party – Peter Fleet, Chairman of the Retail Automotive Alliance and former president of Ford Asia Pacific. Fleet was the Conservative candidate for Southampton Itchen in the 1997 general election, and came second with 28.4% of the vote.
- Green Party – Carolyne Culver, Green Party group leader on West Berkshire Council.
- Breakthrough Party – Carla Gregory, a charity worker from the local area.
- Labour Party – Natasa Pantelic, elected member of Slough Borough Council, and its lead member for health and wellbeing.
- Freedom Alliance – Adrian Oliver, former member of the Green Party, elected as a councillor for the Greens in Camden in the 2006 election.
- Reform UK – Alex Wilson, who previously worked for HS2 Ltd.
- Rejoin EU – Brendan Donnelly, a former Conservative Member of European Parliament.

=== Tactical proposal ===
On 9 May, former Conservative MP Phillip Lee, who joined the Liberal Democrats before the 2019 election, urged the Labour and Green parties not to stand candidates in the by-election to avoid vote splitting. Lee argued that the Conservative Party would be more likely to lose if the anti-Conservative vote went to the Liberal Democrat candidate alone. Writing in The Guardian on 14 May, columnist Polly Toynbee also called for an electoral alliance of the Liberal Democrats, Labour and the Green Party to beat the Conservatives. However, all three parties contested the by-election.

=== Writ and polls ===
On 12 May, the writ for the by-election was moved in the House of Commons by Government Chief Whip Mark Spencer.

On 30 May, The Independent reported that internal party polling by the Liberal Democrats put the Conservatives on 45.5% and the Liberal Democrats on 35.1%, a swing of 9.35% to them. The same survey also found 60% of Labour and Green voters were willing to vote tactically. Further internal party polling by the Liberal Democrats, reported by City A.M., found a closer margin, with the Conservatives on 45% and the Liberal Democrats on 41%. Despite these figures, YouGov's director of political research said "the by-election will be tough to win for the Lib Dems" due to the party putting itself up against a "popular government", unlike when it had won by-elections in the past. Lib Dem leader Ed Davey said that he visited the constituency 16 times during the campaign.

== Result ==
Bar chart of the election result.

2021 by-election: Chesham and Amersham
Party	Candidate	Votes	%	±%
Liberal Democrats	Sarah Green	21,517	56.7	+30.4
Conservative	Peter Fleet	13,489	35.5	–19.9
Green	Carolyne Culver	1,480	3.9	–1.6
Labour	Natasa Pantelic	622	1.6	–11.2
Reform UK	Alex Wilson	414	1.1	N/A
Breakthrough Party	Carla Gregory	197	0.5	N/A
Freedom Alliance	Adrian Oliver	134	0.4	N/A
Rejoin EU	Brendan Donnelly	101	0.3	N/A
Majority		8,028	21.2	N/A
Turnout		37,954	52.1	–24.7
Registered electors		72,828		
Liberal Democrats gain from Conservative		Swing	+25.2	

=== Response ===
The results shocked the political landscape, as politicians and pundits had predicted a Conservative win in the run-up to the by-election. John Curtice, Professor of Politics at the University of Strathclyde, expressed the view that the Liberal Democrats overperformed and compared the by-election to the 1991 Ribble Valley by-election, in which the Liberal Democrats gained a Conservative seat because of local issues. He relayed some locals were "hearing the Conservatives talking endlessly, talking about 'levelling up' – wondering really, well what is, quite, in it for us?" Some commentators suggested the result may indicate wider difficulties for the Conservative Party across the south of England, drawing comparisons to the Labour Party's problems holding on to many of its older bases of support.

This was the lowest ever share of the vote in a Westminster election by a Labour Party candidate.

== Previous result ==
General election 2019: Chesham and Amersham
Party	Candidate	Votes	%	±%
Conservative	Cheryl Gillan	30,850	55.4	–5.3
Liberal Democrats	Dan Gallagher	14,627	26.3	+13.3
Labour	Matt Turmaine	7,166	12.9	–7.7
Green	Alan Booth	3,042	5.5	+2.5
Majority		16,223	29.1	–11.0
Turnout		55,978	76.8	–0.3
Conservative hold		Swing	–9.3	
