= Chesham and Amersham =

UK Parliament constituency (since 1974)

Coordinates: 51.694°N 0.6°W

- County constituency for the House of Commons
- Interactive map of boundaries from 2024
- Boundary of Chesham and Amersham in South East England
- County: Buckinghamshire
- Population: 92,635 (2011 UK Census)
- Electorate: 74,155 (2023)
- Major settlements: Chesham; Amersham; Chalfont St Peter; Gerrards Cross; Hazlemere

Current constituency
- Created: 1974
- Member of Parliament: Sarah Green (Liberal Democrats)
- Seats: One
- Created from: South Buckinghamshire and Aylesbury

Chesham and Amersham is a parliamentary constituency in Buckinghamshire, South East England, represented in the House of Commons by Sarah Green, a Liberal Democrat elected at a 2021 by-election.

== Constituency profile ==
The Chesham and Amersham constituency is located in Buckinghamshire. It lies within the Metropolitan Green Belt, the protected rural area surrounding London, and also within the Chiltern Hills, a National Landscape. It is named after the neighbouring market towns of Chesham and Amersham, and also includes the smaller town of Gerrards Cross and the villages of Hazlemere, Little Chalfont, Chalfont St Giles and Chalfont St Peter. The constituency is highly affluent and most areas within it form part of the 10% least-deprived areas in England. The average house price is more than double the national average. Chesham and Amersham are connected to London by the Metropolitan line, making them some of the most distant locations from central London served by the London Underground.

Compared to national averages, residents of the constituency are older, well-educated, considerably wealthier and much more likely to work in professional occupations. White people make up 82% of the population with Asians, mostly Indians, forming the largest ethnic minority group at 12%. At the local county council, Chesham and Amersham are represented by Liberal Democrat councillors whilst the southern parts of the constituency around Gerrards Cross elected Conservatives. Most voters in the constituency supported remaining in the European Union in the 2016 referendum; an estimated 55% voted to remain compared to 48% nationally.

== History ==
=== Creation ===
The seat was created for the general election in February 1974. It comprised the southern part of the former Rural District of Amersham, including Amersham and the Chalfonts, previously part of the abolished constituency of South Buckinghamshire; and Chesham and the northern part of the former Rural District of Amersham, transferred from Aylesbury.

=== Political history ===
Until the 2021 by-election was won by the Liberal Democrats candidate, the previous general election results in the seat since its creation had seen a Conservative winning margin of between 10,416 (Feb 1974) and 23,920 (2015) votes, in each case an absolute majority of the votes cast. In each of the general elections except two the Liberals, or subsequently Liberal Democrats, had come second, with results as high as 31.15 per cent of the votes cast. Labour came second only once, in 2017, when it achieved its best ever result of 20.6 per cent. UKIP came second in 2015, Labour in 2017 and the Liberal Democrats in 2019.

In June 2016, an estimated 55 per cent of adults voting in the EU referendum in the constituency voted to remain in the European Union, compared with 48% in the UK as a whole. The estimated turnout of 83.6 per cent was the highest in any constituency in the UK, the only higher turnout in the referendum being in Gibraltar. In the 2019 EU Parliament elections more than 50 per cent voted for parties supporting continued UK membership of the EU, although the turnout was only 42.8 per cent. The pro-EU Liberal Democrats were the most popular party with 31.9 per cent, with the pro-Leave Brexit Party in second place on 30 per cent. Despite the seat's support for remaining in the EU, its pro-Brexit MP, Dame Cheryl Gillan, was re-elected in both general elections held after the 2016 referendum (in the case of 2017 with her highest vote share since her first election in 1992), albeit with slightly reduced majorities.

Gillan died in office on 4 April 2021, and the seat was gained by the Liberal Democrats' pro-EU Sarah Green in the subsequent by-election on 17 June 2021 with a majority of 8,028 votes. The Liberal Democrat win in the 2021 Chesham and Amersham by-election was seen as an upset in a historically safe Conservative seat, and party leader Ed Davey tweeted that the result had "sent a shockwave through British politics". It was the first in a series of likewise safe Conservative seats that were lost to the Liberal Democrats through by-elections in that Parliament.

In December 2023, the Labour Party included the seat in its published list of 211 non-battleground seats, suggesting they did not see it as winnable. Sarah Green retained the seat for the Liberal Democrats at the 2024 general election with a swing of 22.4%, giving her a majority of 5,451 (10.0%).

== Boundaries ==
1974–1983: Chesham Urban District and Amersham Rural District.

1983–1997:

- The District of Chiltern wards of Amersham Common, Amersham-on-the-Hill, Amersham Town, Asheridge Vale, Ashley Green and Latimer, Austenwood, Chalfont Common, Chalfont St Giles, Chalfont St Peter Central, Chartridge, Chenies, Chesham Bois and Weedon Hill, Cholesbury and The Lee, Coleshill and Penn Street, Gold Hill, Hilltop, Holmer Green, Little Chalfont, Little Missenden, Lowndes, Newtown, Penn, Pond Park, St Mary's, Seer Green and Jordans, Townsend, and Waterside; and
- The District of Wycombe wards of Hazlemere North and Hazlemere South.

Hazlemere was transferred from Wycombe. Great Missenden was transferred to Aylesbury.

1997–2010:

- The Chiltern District except the wards of Ballinger and South Heath, Great Missenden, and Prestwood and Heath End; and
- The Wycombe District wards of Hazlemere Central, Hazlemere East and Hazlemere West.
Map of boundaries 2010–2024

2010–2024: The Chiltern District.

Great Missenden transferred back from Aylesbury and Hazlemere returned to Wycombe.

2024–present: Further to the 2023 periodic review of Westminster constituencies which became effective for the 2024 general election, the constituency is composed of the following:

- The District of Buckinghamshire wards of Amersham and Chesham Bois, Chalfont St. Giles & Little Chalfont, Chalfont St. Peter, Chesham North (part), Chesham South, Gerrards Cross & Denham (part), Hazlemere (part), Penn, Tylers Green & Loudwater (part) and The Missendens (part)

The boundaries are similar to those of 1983 to 2010, with Great Missenden and the nearby village of Chartridge now included in the new constituency of Mid Buckinghamshire, and Hazlemere returned from Wycombe. In addition, the town of Gerrards Cross was transferred in from Beaconsfield.

== Members of Parliament ==
The present Member of Parliament for Chesham and Amersham is the Liberal Democrat Sarah Green MP who was elected at the 2021 by-election. Previous MPs were the Conservative Cheryl Gillan, who held the position from 1992 until her death in 2021, and Ian Gilmour, who served from 1974 to 1992.

South Buckinghamshire and Aylesbury prior to 1974

Election	Member	Party
1974	Ian Gilmour	Conservative
1992	Dame Cheryl Gillan	Conservative
2021 by-election	Sarah Green	Liberal Democrats

== Elections ==
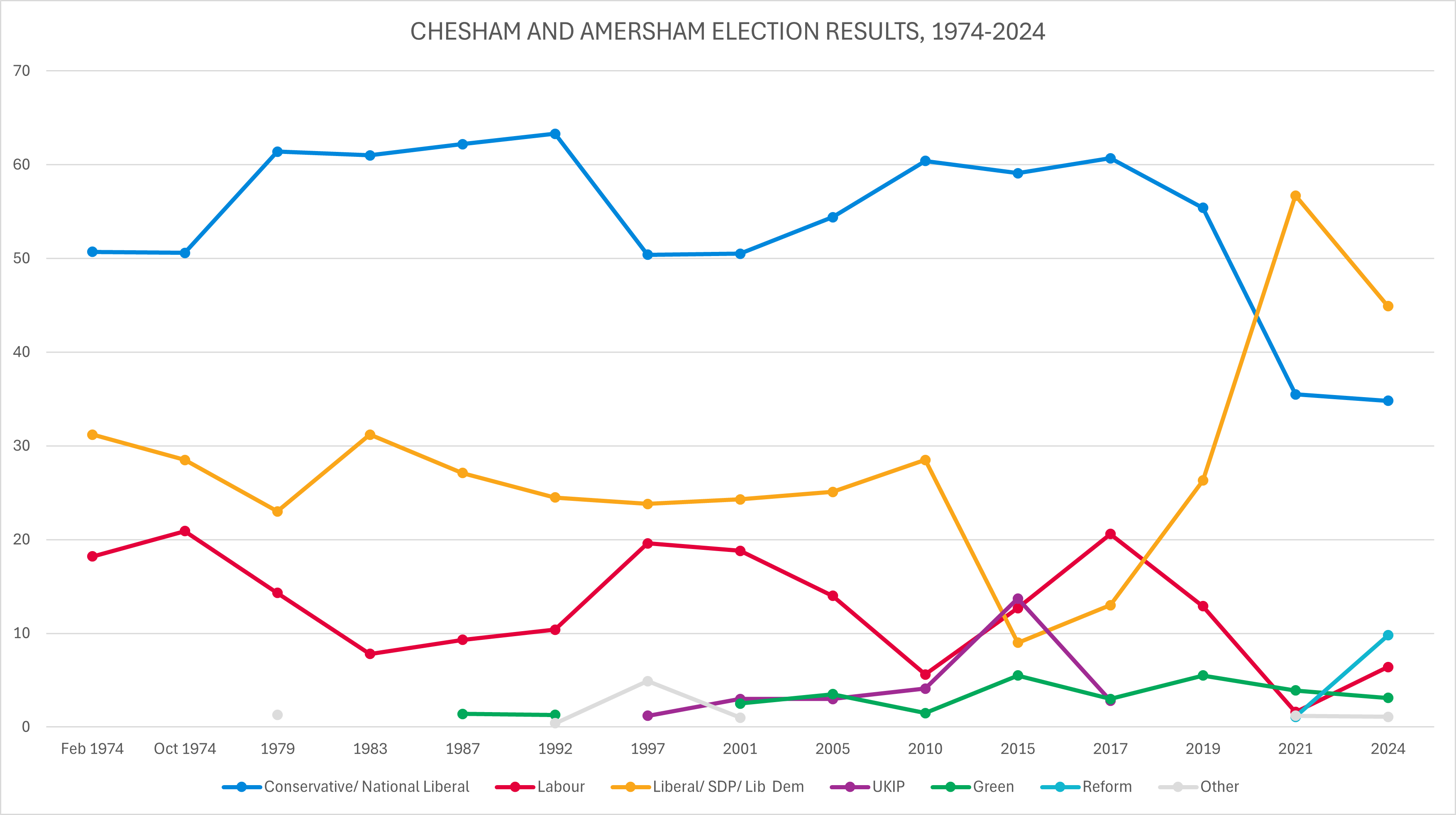
Election results 1974-2024

=== Elections in the 2020s ===
General election 2024: Chesham and Amersham
Party	Candidate	Votes	%	±%
Liberal Democrats	Sarah Green	24,422	44.9	+22.4
Conservative	Gareth Williams	18,971	34.8	−21.5
Reform	Laurence Jarvis	5,310	9.8	N/A
Labour	Chris Chilton	3,502	6.4	−7.5
Green	Justine Fulford	1,673	3.1	−1.7
Workers Party	Muhammad Pervez Khan	466	0.9	N/A
Heritage	Julian Foster	111	0.2	N/A
Majority		5,451	10.1	N/A
Turnout		54,455	72.7	+0.3
Registered electors		74,889		
Liberal Democrats gain from Conservative		Swing	+22.0	

Vote share changes for the 2024 election are compared to the notional results from the 2019 election, not the 2021 by-election.

2021 Chesham and Amersham by-election
Party	Candidate	Votes	%	±%
Liberal Democrats	Sarah Green	21,517	56.7	+30.4
Conservative	Peter Fleet	13,489	35.5	−19.9
Green	Carolyne Culver	1,480	3.9	−1.6
Labour	Natasa Pantelic	622	1.6	−11.2
Reform	Alex Wilson	414	1.1	N/A
Breakthrough Party	Carla Gregory	197	0.5	N/A
Freedom Alliance	Adrian Oliver	134	0.4	N/A
Rejoin EU	Brendan Donnelly	101	0.3	N/A
Majority		8,028	21.2	N/A
Turnout		37,954	52.1	−24.7
Registered electors		72,828		
Liberal Democrats gain from Conservative		Swing	+25.2	

Cheryl Gillan died on 4 April 2021, triggering a by-election held on 17 June 2021.

=== Elections in the 2010s ===
2019 notional result
Party	Vote	%
Conservative	30,264	56.3
Liberal Democrats	12,048	22.4
Labour	7,473	13.9
Green	2,600	4.8
Others	1,326	2.5
Turnout	53,711	72.4
Electorate	74,155	

General election 2019: Chesham and Amersham
Party	Candidate	Votes	%	±%
Conservative	Cheryl Gillan	30,850	55.4	−5.3
Liberal Democrats	Dan Gallagher	14,627	26.3	+13.3
Labour	Matt Turmaine	7,166	12.9	−7.7
Green	Alan Booth	3,042	5.5	+2.5
Majority		16,223	29.1	−11.0
Turnout		55,685	76.8	−0.3
Conservative hold		Swing	-9.3	

General election 2017: Chesham and Amersham
Party	Candidate	Votes	%	±%
Conservative	Cheryl Gillan	33,514	60.7	+1.6
Labour	Nina Dluzewska	11,374	20.6	+7.9
Liberal Democrats	Peter Jones	7,179	13.0	+4.0
Green	Alan Booth	1,660	3.0	−2.5
UKIP	David Meacock	1,525	2.8	−10.9
Majority		22,140	40.1	−5.3
Turnout		55,252	77.1	+4.4
Conservative hold		Swing		

General election 2015: Chesham and Amersham
Party	Candidate	Votes	%	±%
Conservative	Cheryl Gillan	31,138	59.1	−1.3
UKIP	Alan Stevens	7,218	13.7	+9.6
Labour	Ben Davies	6,712	12.7	+7.1
Liberal Democrats	Kirsten Johnson	4,761	9.0	−19.5
Green	Gill Walker	2,902	5.5	+4.0
Majority		23,920	45.4	+13.5
Turnout		52,731	72.7	−1.9
Conservative hold		Swing		

General election 2010: Chesham and Amersham
Party	Candidate	Votes	%	±%
Conservative	Cheryl Gillan	31,658	60.4	+6.8
Liberal Democrats	Tim Starkey	14,948	28.5	+2.3
Labour	Anthony Gajadharsingh	2,942	5.6	−8.0
UKIP	Alan Stevens	2,129	4.1	+0.9
Green	Nick Wilkins	767	1.5	−2.0
Majority		16,710	31.9	+2.6
Turnout		52,444	74.6	+6.6
Conservative hold		Swing	+2.2	

=== Elections in the 2000s ===
General election 2005: Chesham and Amersham
Party	Candidate	Votes	%	±%
Conservative	Cheryl Gillan	25,619	54.4	+3.9
Liberal Democrats	John Ford	11,821	25.1	+0.8
Labour	Rupa Huq	6,610	14.0	−4.8
Green	Nick Wilkins	1,656	3.5	+1.0
UKIP	David Samuel-Camps	1,391	3.0	0.0
Majority		13,798	29.3	+3.1
Turnout		47,097	68.0	+3.3
Conservative hold		Swing	+1.5	

General election 2001: Chesham and Amersham
Party	Candidate	Votes	%	±%
Conservative	Cheryl Gillan	22,867	50.5	+0.1
Liberal Democrats	John Ford	10,985	24.3	+0.5
Labour	Kenneth Hulme	8,497	18.8	−0.8
UKIP	Ian Harvey	1,367	3.0	+1.8
Green	Nick Wilkins	1,114	2.5	N/A
ProLife Alliance	Gillian Duval	453	1.0	N/A
Majority		11,882	26.2	−0.4
Turnout		45,283	64.7	−9.8
Conservative hold		Swing	−0.1	

=== Elections in the 1990s ===
General election 1997: Chesham and Amersham
Party	Candidate	Votes	%	±%
Conservative	Cheryl Gillan	26,298	50.4	−12.9
Liberal Democrats	Michael Brand	12,439	23.8	−0.7
Labour	Paul Farrelly	10,240	19.6	+9.2
Referendum	Paul Andrews	2,528	4.8	N/A
UKIP	C Shilson	618	1.2	N/A
Natural Law	Hugh Godfrey	74	0.1	−0.3
Majority		13,859	26.6	−12.2
Turnout		52,197	74.5	−7.4
Conservative hold		Swing	−6.1	

General election 1992: Chesham and Amersham
Party	Candidate	Votes	%	±%
Conservative	Cheryl Gillan	36,273	63.3	+1.1
Liberal Democrats	Andrew Ketteringham	14,053	24.5	−2.6
Labour	Candy Atherton	5,931	10.4	+1.1
Green	CL Strickland	753	1.3	−0.1
Natural Law	MTL Griffith-Jones	255	0.4	N/A
Majority		22,220	38.8	+3.7
Turnout		57,265	81.9	+4.5
Conservative hold		Swing	+1.9	

=== Elections in the 1980s ===
General election 1987: Chesham and Amersham
Party	Candidate	Votes	%	±%
Conservative	Ian Gilmour	34,504	62.2	+1.1
Liberal	Andrew Ketteringham	15,064	27.1	−4.0
Labour	Paul Goulding	5,170	9.3	+1.5
Green	Ann Darnbrough	760	1.4	N/A
Majority		19,440	35.1	+5.3
Turnout		55,498	77.4	+1.4
Conservative hold		Swing	+2.6	

General election 1983: Chesham and Amersham
Party	Candidate	Votes	%	±%
Conservative	Ian Gilmour	32,435	61.0	−0.4
Liberal	Robert Bradnock	16,556	31.2	+8.2
Labour	Clive Duncan	4,150	7.8	−6.5
Majority		15,879	29.8	−8.5
Turnout		53,141	75.94	−3.8
Conservative hold		Swing	−3.9	

=== Elections in the 1970s ===
General election 1979: Chesham and Amersham
Party	Candidate	Votes	%	±%
Conservative	Ian Gilmour	32,924	61.4	+9.8
Liberal	R Bradnock	12,328	23.0	−5.5
Labour	Elizabeth Barratt	7,645	14.3	−6.6
National Front	S Clinch	697	1.3	N/A
Majority		20,596	38.4	+16.3
Turnout		53,594	79.7	+1.6
Conservative hold		Swing	+7.6	

General election October 1974: Chesham and Amersham
Party	Candidate	Votes	%	±%
Conservative	Ian Gilmour	25,078	50.6	−0.1
Liberal	DA Stoddart	14,091	28.5	−2.7
Labour	JR Poston	10,325	20.9	+1.3
Majority		10,987	22.1	+2.6
Turnout		49,494	78.1	−4.9
Conservative hold		Swing	−1.3	

General election February 1974: Chesham and Amersham
Party	Candidate	Votes	%	±%
Conservative	Ian Gilmour	27,035	50.7	
Liberal	D A Stoddart	16,619	31.2	
Labour	BM Warshaw	9,700	18.2	
Majority		10,416	19.5	
Turnout		53,354	85.0	
Conservative win (new seat)				

== See also ==
- 2021 Chesham and Amersham by-election
- List of parliamentary constituencies in Buckinghamshire
- List of parliamentary constituencies in the South East England (region)
