= Sarah Green (politician) =

British politician (born 1982)

Sarah Green MP
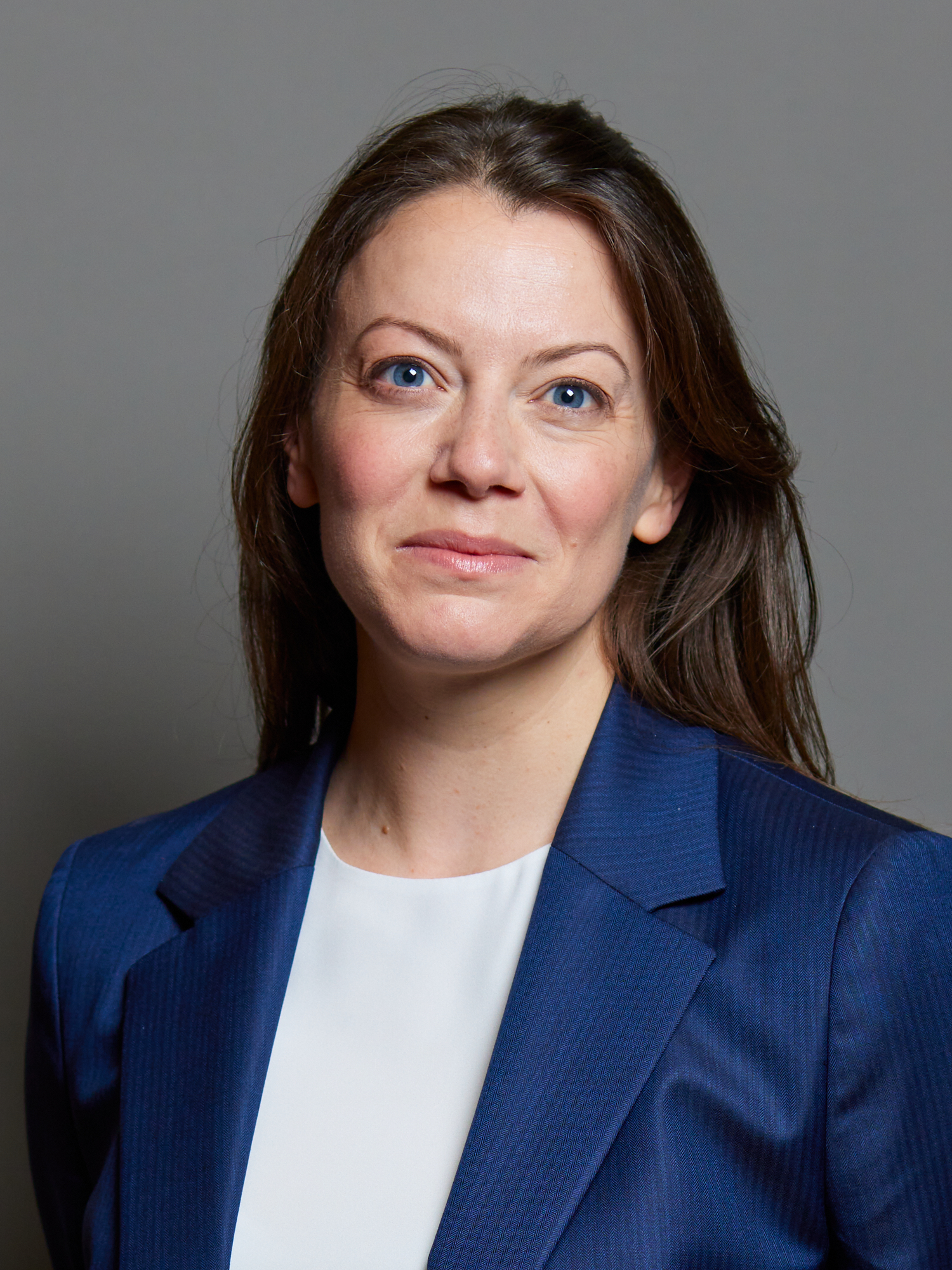
- Official portrait, 2021

Member of Parliament for Chesham and Amersham
- Incumbent
- Assumed office 17 June 2021
- Preceded by: Dame Cheryl Gillan
- Majority: 5,451 (10.1%)

Liberal Democrat portfolios
- 2022–2024: Wales
- 2022–2024: International Trade

Personal details
- Born: Sarah Louise Green; 25 April 1982 (age 44) Corwen, Denbighshire, Wales
- Party: Liberal Democrats
- Education: Aberystwyth University (BA)
- Website: www.sarahgreen.org.uk

Sarah Louise Green (born 25 April 1982) is a Welsh businesswoman and Liberal Democrat politician who has been the Member of Parliament (MP) for Chesham and Amersham since 2021.

== Early life and career ==
Sarah Green was born on 25 April 1982 in Corwen, Clwyd in North Wales, and grew up there. She studied at Aberystwyth University and Manchester Metropolitan University. She was the chair of IR Cymru (now Welsh Young Liberals) during her time at Aberystwyth. She speaks Welsh fluently.

Green founded the marketing and communications company Green and Ginger in 2014. Her previous experience included working for Euromonitor International and Kantar TNS.

In 2019, Green worked on Dominic Grieve's general election campaign.

== Parliamentary career ==
Green was selected as the Liberal Democrat candidate for the Ynys Môn constituency for the 2005 general election. She finished fifth with 6.8% of the vote behind the incumbent Labour MP Albert Owen, Plaid Cymru's Eurig Wyn, the independent candidate Peter Rogers, and the Conservative candidate.

At the 2010 general election, Green contested Arfon, where she finished fourth with 14.1% of the vote behind Plaid Cymru's Hywel Williams, Labour's Alun Pugh, and the Conservative's Robin Millar.

On 4 April 2021, Dame Cheryl Gillan died from cancer, triggering the 2021 Chesham and Amersham by-election. Green was elected as MP with 56.7% of the vote and a majority of 8,028. Green is only the third MP to represent the constituency since its creation in 1974, and taking preceding constituencies into account the first MP other than a Conservative since 1923. She is also the constituency's second consecutive Welsh-born MP.

In her victory speech, Green called on voters to "reject Conservative mismanagement" and vowed to "continue the work of holding this Government to account for letting Covid rip through the care homes. We will speak up for the three million people excluded from financial support throughout the pandemic and we will challenge Boris Johnson to be far more ambitious in tackling climate change, supporting our frontline workers and backing our small businesses." She was sworn into Parliament on 21 June 2021, and made her maiden speech on 7 September 2021.

On 11 July 2022, Green was appointed Liberal Democrat Spokesperson for International Trade and Liberal Democrat Spokesperson for Wales, roles she held until shortly after the 2024 General Election.

In April 2024, The Times reported on Green's use of an outsourcing company owned by a former Liberal Democrat official, Candy Piercy. The company, Midas Training, which has received over £120,000 via Green's parliamentary expenses, is run by Candy Piercy, the Vice Chair of Green's local party. A Lib Dem spokesperson confirmed that most MPs employ staff who are members of their political party, including councillors, activists, and party officers and that there was 'nothing unusual about this'. In this case Green was buying in staffing services, which is common, standard practice and within the rules of expenses regulator, the Independent Parliamentary Standards Authority (IPSA). She had been fully transparent and reported her staffing costs in full to the regulator 'in the normal and correct way'.

At the 2024 general election, Green was re-elected to Parliament as MP for Chesham and Amersham with a majority of 5,451 (a vote share of 44.8%), representing an increase of 22.4% from the 2019 General Election. However the constituency boundaries had changed since 2019 and the 2021 by-election so the results are not directly comparable. Modelling of the 2019 result suggest that Liberal Democrat support had been less in area represented by the new boundaries and therefore that Sarah Green's 2024 result was an even greater swing.

On 28 October 2024, Green was appointed to the Public Accounts Committee.

Green is a co-sponsor of Kim Leadbeater's Terminally Ill Adults (End of Life) Bill on assisted suicide.

== Policy positions ==
=== HS2 Railway Line ===
Green opposes the construction of the HS2 railway line that was planned to go through her constituency, since before, during and since her election in 2021. The day after the by-election, party leader Ed Davey was challenged on BBC Radio 4's Today programme on how his party's support for HS2 fitted with Green's stated opposition to the project. Davey said the party was still in favour of the project but that they would be a "thorn in the side" of the delivery company HS2 Ltd, saying that it had ignored local people's concerns over issues such as the transparency of the impact of the Chilterns tunnelling works on local water supplies.

Since first being elected in 2021, Green has consistently challenged HS2, in particular over HS2 contractors unlawfully taking water from hydrants without permission during the summer of 2022 and over sinkholes that appeared just outside Amersham in May 2023.

=== Planning laws ===
Green opposed the changes to England's planning laws that were proposed by the Conservative government in 2021 which she claimed would "see more unwanted destruction to our countryside", "allow developers to build over our greenbelt with local residents powerless to stop them", and "be a devastating blow to our area". These plans were subsequently dropped by the government later that year in response to reaction amongst Conservatives MPs across the South-East who feared for their own electoral chances following Green's election.

Parliament of the United Kingdom
Preceded by Cheryl Gillan	Member of Parliament for Chesham and Amersham; 2021–present	Incumbent
