= Sunak ministry =

Government of the United Kingdom from 2022 to 2024

- Cabinet of the United Kingdom
- 2022–2024
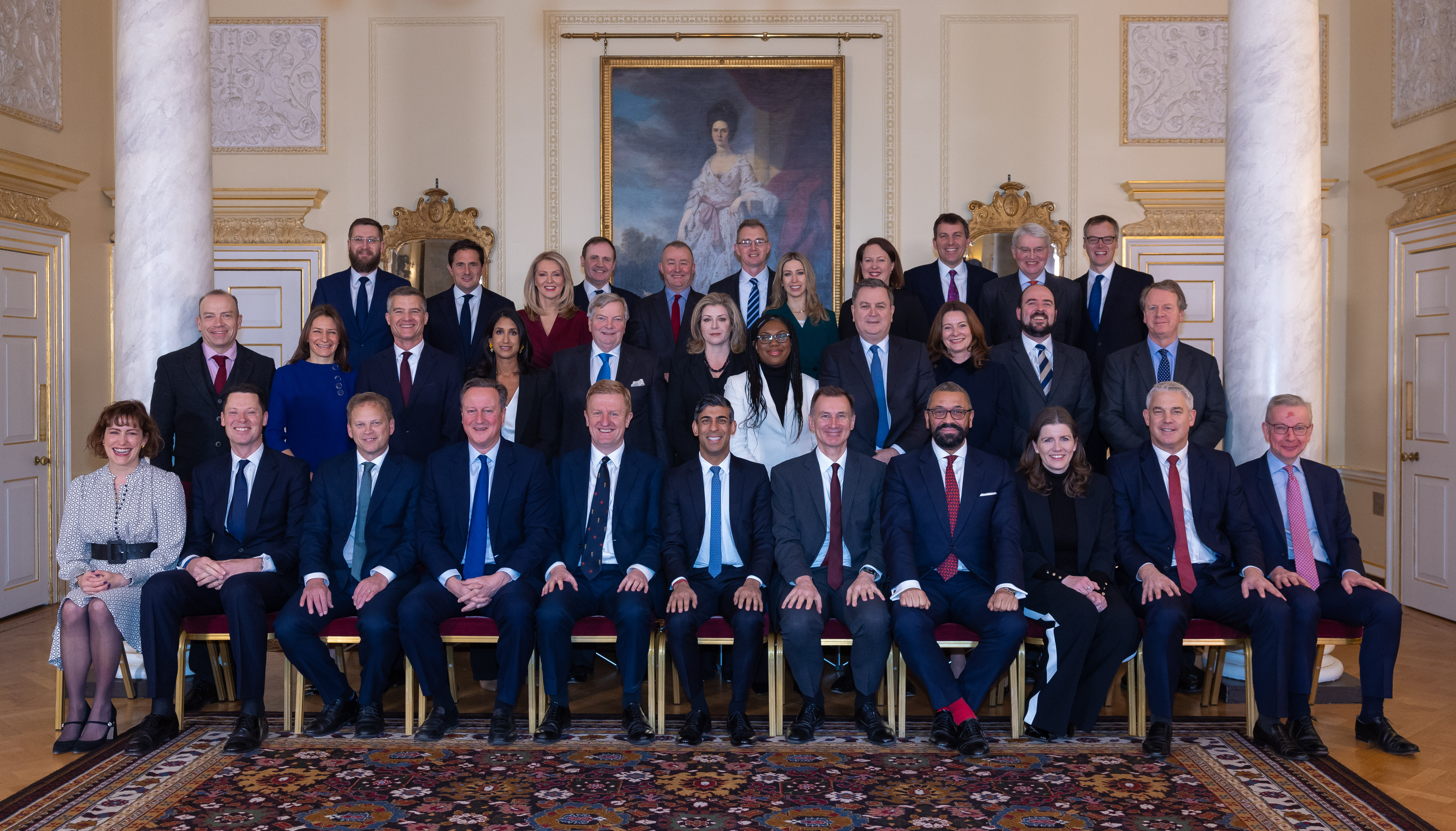
- Sunak's cabinet in January 2024
- Date formed: 25 October 2022
- Date dissolved: 5 July 2024

People and organisations
- Monarch: Charles III
- Prime Minister: Rishi Sunak
- Deputy Prime Minister: Dominic Raab (2022–2023); Oliver Dowden (2023–2024)
- Ministers removed: 11 resigned
- Member party: Conservative Party
- Status in legislature: Majority government
- Opposition cabinet: Starmer shadow cabinet
- Opposition party: Labour Party
- Opposition leader: Keir Starmer

History
- Incoming formation: October 2022 leadership election
- Outgoing election: 2024 general election
- Legislature term: 2019–2024
- Budgets: November 2022 autumn statement; 2023 budget; November 2023 autumn statement; March 2024 budget
- Predecessor: Truss ministry
- Successor: Starmer ministry

The Sunak ministry began on 25 October 2022 when Rishi Sunak was invited by King Charles III to succeed Liz Truss as Prime Minister of the United Kingdom. The previous day, Sunak had been elected unopposed as leader of the Conservative Party following Truss's resignation. The Sunak ministry was formed from the 2019 Parliament of the United Kingdom, as a Conservative majority government. Sunak reshuffled his cabinet twice, first in February 2023 and later in November 2023.

On 22 May 2024, Sunak announced a general election on 4 July, in which the Labour Party won a landslide victory, leading to the formations of the Starmer ministry and the Sunak shadow cabinet.

== Cabinets ==
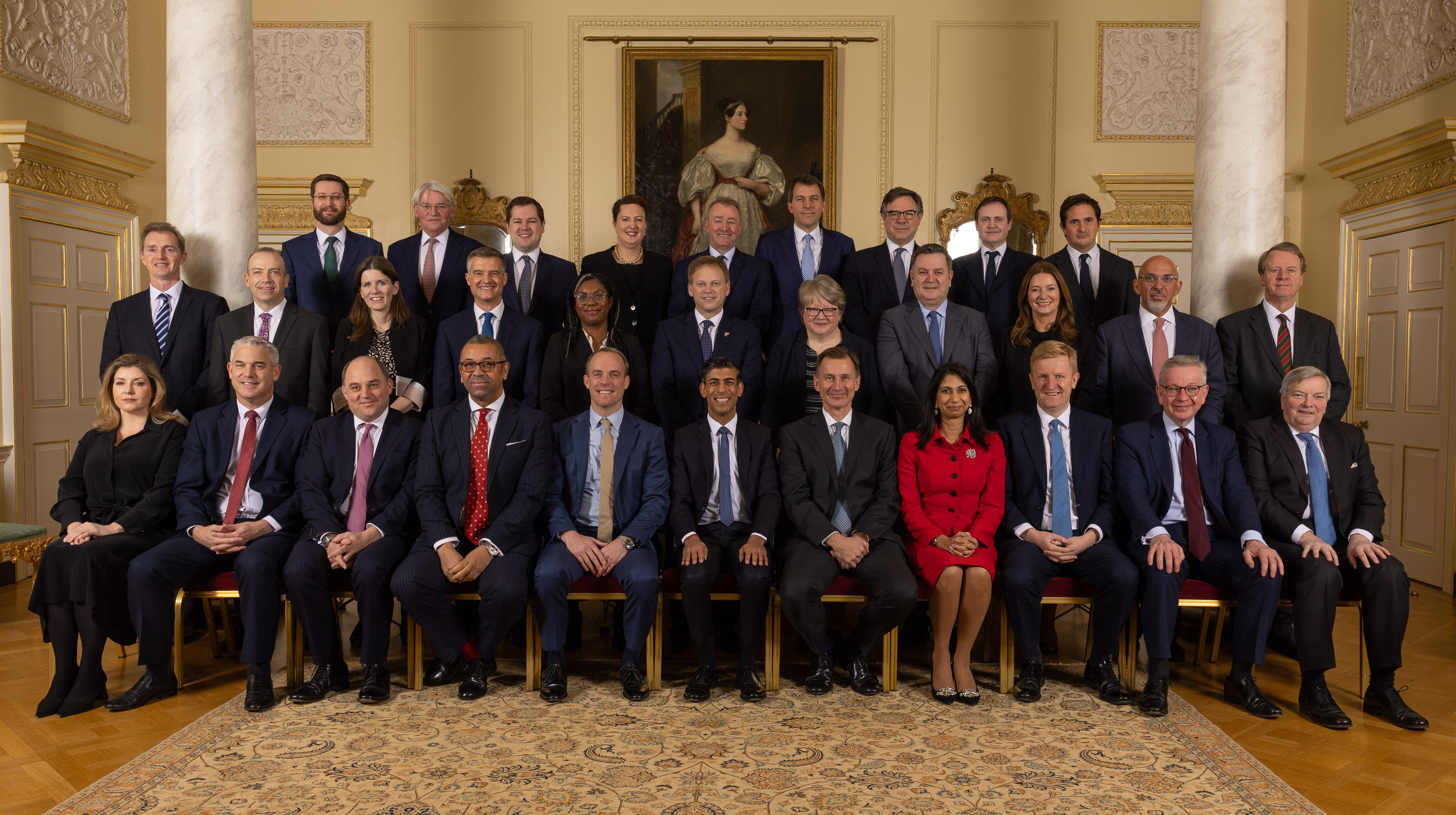
Sunak's first cabinet in December 2022

=== October 2022 – February 2023 ===
First Sunak Cabinet
Portfolio	Portrait	Minister	Term
Cabinet ministers
Prime Minister; First Lord of the Treasury; Minister for the Civil Service; Minister for the Union		Rishi Sunak	October 2022 – July 2024
Deputy Prime Minister; Secretary of State for Justice; Lord High Chancellor of Great Britain		Dominic Raab	October 2022 – April 2023
Chancellor of the Exchequer; Second Lord of the Treasury		Jeremy Hunt	October 2022 – July 2024
Secretary of State for Foreign, Commonwealth and Development Affairs		James Cleverly	September 2022 – November 2023
Secretary of State for the Home Department		Suella Braverman	October 2022 – November 2023
Secretary of State for Defence		Ben Wallace	July 2019 – August 2023
Chancellor of the Duchy of Lancaster		Oliver Dowden	October 2022 – July 2024
Secretary of State for Levelling Up, Housing and Communities; Minister for Intergovernmental Relations		Michael Gove	October 2022 – July 2024
Secretary of State for Health and Social Care		Steve Barclay	October 2022 – November 2023
Leader of the House of Commons; Lord President of the Council		Penny Mordaunt	September 2022 – July 2024
Leader of the House of Lords; Lord Keeper of the Privy Seal		Nicholas True; Baron True	September 2022 – July 2024
Secretary of State for Business, Energy and Industrial Strategy		Grant Shapps	October 2022 – February 2023
Secretary of State for Environment, Food and Rural Affairs		Thérèse Coffey	October 2022 – November 2023
Secretary of State for International Trade		Kemi Badenoch	September 2022 – February 2023
President of the Board of Trade		Kemi Badenoch	September 2022 – July 2024
Minister for Women and Equalities		Kemi Badenoch	October 2022 – July 2024
Secretary of State for Work and Pensions		Mel Stride	October 2022 – July 2024
Secretary of State for Education		Gillian Keegan	October 2022 – July 2024
Secretary of State for Transport		Mark Harper	October 2022 – July 2024
Secretary of State for Digital, Culture, Media and Sport		Michelle Donelan	September 2022 – February 2023
Minister without Portfolio; Party Chairman		Nadhim Zahawi (unpaid)	October 2022 – January 2023
Secretary of State for Northern Ireland		Chris Heaton-Harris	September 2022 – July 2024
Secretary of State for Scotland		Alister Jack	July 2019 – July 2024
Secretary of State for Wales		David TC Davies	October 2022 – July 2024
Also attending cabinet meetings
Parliamentary Secretary to the Treasury; Chief Whip of the House of Commons		Simon Hart	October 2022 – July 2024
Chief Secretary to the Treasury		John Glen (unpaid)	October 2022 – November 2023
Attorney General for England and Wales; Advocate General for Northern Ireland		Victoria Prentis	October 2022 – July 2024
Minister for the Cabinet Office; Paymaster General		Jeremy Quin	October 2022 – November 2023
Minister of State for Immigration		Robert Jenrick	October 2022 – December 2023
Minister of State for Security		Tom Tugendhat	September 2022 – July 2024
Minister of State without Portfolio		Sir; Gavin Williamson	October 2022 – November 2022
Minister of State for Veterans' Affairs		Johnny Mercer	October 2022 – July 2024
Minister of State for Development and Africa		Andrew Mitchell	October 2022 – July 2024

==== Changes ====
- Gavin Williamson resigned as Minister of State without Portfolio on 8 November 2022. This followed allegations that he used improper language to former Chief Whip Wendy Morton and had bullied several staffers during his time as a Cabinet minister under Theresa May.
- Nadhim Zahawi was dismissed as chairman of the Conservative Party after an investigation said he had committed a "serious breach of ministerial code" over his tax affairs. He was replaced by Greg Hands, who was a Trade Minister prior to this appointment.

=== February 2023 – November 2023 ===
Second Sunak Cabinet
Portfolio	Portrait	Minister	Term
Cabinet ministers
Prime Minister; First Lord of the Treasury; Minister for the Civil Service; Minister for the Union		Rishi Sunak	October 2022 – July 2024
Chancellor of the Duchy of Lancaster		Oliver Dowden	October 2022 – July 2024
Secretary of State in the Cabinet Office		Oliver Dowden	February 2023 – July 2024
Deputy Prime Minister		Oliver Dowden	April 2023 – July 2024
Deputy Prime Minister		Dominic Raab	October 2022 – April 2023
Secretary of State for Justice; Lord High Chancellor of Great Britain		Dominic Raab	October 2022 – April 2023
Secretary of State for Justice; Lord High Chancellor of Great Britain		Alex Chalk	April 2023 – July 2024
Chancellor of the Exchequer; Second Lord of the Treasury		Jeremy Hunt	October 2022 – July 2024
Secretary of State for Foreign, Commonwealth and Development Affairs		James Cleverly	September 2022 – November 2023
Secretary of State for the Home Department		Suella Braverman	October 2022 – November 2023
Secretary of State for Defence		Ben Wallace	July 2019 – August 2023
Secretary of State for Defence		Grant Shapps	August 2023 – July 2024
Secretary of State for Energy Security and Net Zero		Grant Shapps	February 2023 – August 2023
Secretary of State for Energy Security and Net Zero		Claire Coutinho	August 2023 – July 2024
Secretary of State for Science, Innovation and Technology		Michelle Donelan	February 2023 – July 2024 (Minister on Leave 28 April – 20 July 2023)
Secretary of State for Science, Innovation and Technology		Chloe Smith	April 2023 – July 2023
Secretary of State for Levelling Up, Housing and Communities; Minister for Intergovernmental Relations		Michael Gove	October 2022 – July 2024
Secretary of State for Health and Social Care		Steve Barclay	October 2022 – November 2023
Leader of the House of Commons; Lord President of the Council		Penny Mordaunt	September 2022 – July 2024
Leader of the House of Lords; Lord Keeper of the Privy Seal		Nicholas True; Baron True	September 2022 – July 2024
Secretary of State for Business and Trade		Kemi Badenoch	February 2023 – July 2024
President of the Board of Trade		Kemi Badenoch	September 2022 – July 2024
Minister for Women and Equalities		Kemi Badenoch	October 2022 – July 2024
Secretary of State for Environment, Food and Rural Affairs		Thérèse Coffey	October 2022 – November 2023
Secretary of State for Work and Pensions		Mel Stride	October 2022 – July 2024
Secretary of State for Education		Gillian Keegan	October 2022 – July 2024
Secretary of State for Transport		Mark Harper	October 2022 – July 2024
Secretary of State for Culture, Media and Sport		Lucy Frazer	February 2023 – July 2024
Minister without Portfolio; Party Chairman		Greg Hands (unpaid)	February 2023 – November 2023
Secretary of State for Northern Ireland		Chris Heaton-Harris	September 2022 – July 2024
Secretary of State for Scotland		Alister Jack	July 2019 – July 2024
Secretary of State for Wales		David TC Davies	October 2022 – July 2024
Also attending cabinet meetings
Parliamentary Secretary to the Treasury; Chief Whip of the House of Commons		Simon Hart	October 2022 – July 2024
Chief Secretary to the Treasury		John Glen (unpaid)	October 2022 – November 2023
Attorney General for England and Wales; Advocate General for Northern Ireland		Victoria Prentis	October 2022 – July 2024
Minister for the Cabinet Office; Paymaster General		Jeremy Quin	October 2022 – November 2023
Minister of State for Immigration		Robert Jenrick	October 2022 – December 2023
Minister of State for Security		Tom Tugendhat	September 2022 – July 2024
Minister of State for Development and Africa		Andrew Mitchell	October 2022 – July 2024
Minister of State for Veterans' Affairs		Johnny Mercer	October 2022 – July 2024

==== Changes ====
- Dominic Raab resigned as Deputy Prime Minister and Justice Secretary on 21 April 2023 after an inquiry into allegations of bullying. He was replaced as Deputy Prime Minister by Oliver Dowden and as Justice Secretary by Alex Chalk.
- Ben Wallace resigned as Defence Secretary on 31 August 2023. Wallace stated that he was resigning to "invest in the parts of life that I have neglected, and to explore new opportunities". He was replaced by Grant Shapps, who was Secretary of State for Energy Security and Net Zero prior to being appointed as Defence Secretary. Shapps was replaced as Energy Secretary by Claire Coutinho, who was a junior minister in the Department for Education at the time, Coutinho herself being replaced by backbencher David Johnston.
- Michelle Donelan was appointed Minister on Leave on 28 April 2023, she was temporarily replaced as Secretary of State for Science, Innovation and Technology by Chloe Smith. Donelan was reappointed Science Secretary on 20 July 2023.

=== November 2023 – July 2024 ===
Portfolio	Portrait	Minister	Term
Cabinet ministers
Prime Minister; First Lord of the Treasury; Minister for the Civil Service; Minister for the Union		Rishi Sunak	October 2022 – July 2024
Deputy Prime Minister		Oliver Dowden	April 2023 – July 2024
Secretary of State in the Cabinet Office		Oliver Dowden	February 2023 – July 2024
Chancellor of the Duchy of Lancaster		Oliver Dowden	October 2022 – July 2024
Chancellor of the Exchequer; Second Lord of the Treasury		Jeremy Hunt	October 2022 – July 2024
Secretary of State for Foreign, Commonwealth and Development Affairs		David Cameron, Baron Cameron of Chipping Norton	November 2023 – July 2024
Secretary of State for the Home Department		James Cleverly	November 2023 – July 2024
Secretary of State for Defence		Grant Shapps	August 2023 – July 2024
Secretary of State for Justice; Lord High Chancellor of Great Britain		Alex Chalk	April 2023 – July 2024
Secretary of State for Science, Innovation and Technology		Michelle Donelan	February 2023 – July 2024
Secretary of State for Levelling Up, Housing and Communities; Minister for Intergovernmental Relations		Michael Gove	October 2022 – July 2024
Secretary of State for Health and Social Care		Victoria Atkins	November 2023 – July 2024
Secretary of State for Environment, Food and Rural Affairs		Steve Barclay	November 2023 – July 2024
Leader of the House of Commons; Lord President of the Council		Penny Mordaunt	September 2022 – July 2024
Leader of the House of Lords; Lord Keeper of the Privy Seal		Nicholas True, Baron True	September 2022 – July 2024
Secretary of State for Business and Trade		Kemi Badenoch	February 2023 – July 2024
President of the Board of Trade		Kemi Badenoch	September 2022 – July 2024
Minister for Women and Equalities		Kemi Badenoch	October 2022 – July 2024
Secretary of State for Energy Security and Net Zero		Claire Coutinho	August 2023 – July 2024
Secretary of State for Work and Pensions		Mel Stride	October 2022 – July 2024
Secretary of State for Education		Gillian Keegan	October 2022 – July 2024
Secretary of State for Transport		Mark Harper	October 2022 – July 2024
Secretary of State for Culture, Media and Sport		Lucy Frazer	February 2023 – July 2024
Minister without Portfolio; Party Chairman		Richard Holden	November 2023 – July 2024
Secretary of State for Northern Ireland		Chris Heaton-Harris	September 2022 – July 2024
Secretary of State for Scotland		Alister Jack	July 2019 – July 2024
Secretary of State for Wales		David TC Davies	October 2022 – July 2024
Also attending cabinet meetings
Parliamentary Secretary to the Treasury; Chief Whip of the House of Commons		Simon Hart	October 2022 – July 2024
Chief Secretary to the Treasury		Laura Trott	November 2023 – July 2024
Attorney General for England and Wales; Advocate General for Northern Ireland		Victoria Prentis	October 2022 – July 2024
Minister for the Cabinet Office; Paymaster General		John Glen (unpaid)	November 2023 – July 2024
Minister of State without Portfolio		Esther McVey	November 2023 – July 2024
Minister of State for Immigration		Robert Jenrick	October 2022 – December 2023
Minister of State for Countering Illegal Migration		Michael Tomlinson	December 2023 – July 2024
Minister of State for Security		Tom Tugendhat	September 2022 – July 2024
Deputy Foreign Secretary		Andrew Mitchell	April 2024 – July 2024
Minister of State for Development and Africa		Andrew Mitchell	October 2022 – July 2024
Minister of State for Veterans' Affairs		Johnny Mercer	October 2022 – July 2024

==== Changes ====
- Suella Braverman was sacked as Home Secretary on 13 November 2023 and was replaced by James Cleverly and David Cameron was made Foreign Secretary.
- Robert Jenrick resigned as Minister of State for Immigration on 6 December 2023, citing the Rwanda Bill's failure to allow the government to override the international laws that have stopped the government sending asylum seekers to central Africa. He was replaced in cabinet by Michael Tomlinson, as Minister of State for Illegal Migration
- Graham Stuart resigned as Energy Minister on 12 April 2024 to spend more time focusing on local issues. He was replaced by Justin Tomlinson.
- Andrew Mitchell was made Deputy Foreign Secretary on 12 April 2024.

== List of ministers ==
Minister in the House of Commons	Minister in the House of Lords
Cabinet ministers and ministers that attend cabinet are listed **in bold**

=== Prime Minister and Cabinet Office ===
Cabinet Office
Post	Minister	Term
Prime Minister of the United Kingdom; First Lord of the Treasury; Minister for the Civil Service; Minister for the Union	**Rishi Sunak**	October 2022 – July 2024
Deputy Prime Minister	**Sir Oliver Dowden**	April 2023 – July 2024
Secretary of State in the Cabinet Office	**Sir Oliver Dowden**	February 2023 – July 2024
Chancellor of the Duchy of Lancaster	**Sir Oliver Dowden**	October 2022 – July 2024
Minister for the Cabinet Office; Paymaster General	Jeremy Quin	October 2022 – November 2023
Minister for the Cabinet Office; Paymaster General	**John Glen** (unpaid)	November 2023 – July 2024
Minister without Portfolio (unpaid; Chairman of the Conservative Party)	Nadhim Zahawi	October 2022 – February 2023
Minister without Portfolio (unpaid; Chairman of the Conservative Party)	Greg Hands	February 2023 – November 2023
Minister without Portfolio (unpaid; Chairman of the Conservative Party)	**Richard Holden**	November 2023 – July 2024
Minister of State for Veterans' Affairs	**Johnny Mercer**	October 2022 – July 2024
Minister of State without Portfolio	Sir Gavin Williamson	October 2022 – November 2022
Minister of State without Portfolio	**Esther McVey**	November 2023 – July 2024
Minister of State at the Cabinet Office	Lucy Neville-Rolfe, Baroness Neville-Rolfe (unpaid)	September 2022 – July 2024
Minister of State for the Investment Security Unit	Nus Ghani (jointly with Business and Trade)	February 2023 – March 2024
Minister of State at the Cabinet Office	Steve Baker	February 2024 – July 2024
Parliamentary Secretary	Alex Burghart	October 2022 – July 2024
Parliamentary Under-Secretary of State for the Investment Security Unit	Alan Mak (jointly with Business and Trade)	March 2024 – July 2024

=== Departments of state ===
Business, Energy and Industrial Strategy (Department dissolved February 2023)
Secretary of State for Business, Energy and Industrial Strategy	Grant Shapps	October 2022 – February 2023
Minister of State for Energy and Climate	Graham Stuart	September 2022 – February 2023
Minister of State for Industry and Investment Security	Nus Ghani	September 2022 – February 2023
Minister of State for Science, Research and Innovation	George Freeman	October 2022 – February 2023
Parliamentary Under-Secretary of State for Enterprise, Markets and Small Business	Kevin Hollinrake	October 2022 – February 2023
Parliamentary Under-Secretary of State for Business, Energy and Corporate Responsibility	Martin Callanan, Baron Callanan	February 2020 – February 2023

Business and Trade from February 2023
Secretary of State for Business and Trade; President of the Board of Trade; Minister for Women and Equalities	**Kemi Badenoch**	February 2023 – July 2024
Minister of State for Industry and Economic Security	Nus Ghani (jointly with Cabinet Office)	February 2023 – March 2024
Minister of State for International Trade	Nigel Huddleston	February 2023 – November 2023
Minister of State for Trade Policy also Minister for London	Greg Hands	November 2023 – July 2024
Minister of State for Investment	Dominic Johnson, Baron Johnson of Lainston (unpaid)	February 2023 – July 2024
Minister of State for Regulatory Reform	Timothy Elliot-Murray-Kynynmound, 7th Earl of Minto	March 2023 – November 2023
Minister of State for Regulatory Reform	Dominic Johnson, Baron Johnson of Lainston (unpaid)	November 2023 – July 2024
Minister of State for Enterprise, Markets and Small Business	Kevin Hollinrake	March 2024 – July 2024
Parliamentary Under-Secretary of State for Enterprise, Markets and Small Business	Kevin Hollinrake	February 2023 – March 2024
Parliamentary Under-Secretary of State for Exports	Malcolm Offord, Baron Offord of Garvel (unpaid)	April 2023 – July 2024
Parliamentary Under Secretary of State Minister for Industry and Economic Security	Alan Mak (jointly with Cabinet Office)	March 2024 – July 2024
Parliamentary Under Secretary of State for Equalities	Stuart Andrew	February 2023 – July 2024
Parliamentary Under Secretary of State for Women	Maria Caulfield	February 2023 – July 2024

Defence
Secretary of State for Defence	Ben Wallace	July 2019 – August 2023
Secretary of State for Defence	**Grant Shapps**	August 2023 – July 2024
Minister of State for the Armed Forces	James Heappey	February 2020 – March 2024
Minister of State for the Armed Forces	Leo Docherty	March 2024 – July 2024
Minister of State for Defence	Annabel Goldie, Baroness Goldie (unpaid)	July 2019 – November 2023
Minister of State for Defence	Timothy Elliot-Murray-Kynynmound, 7th Earl of Minto (unpaid)	November 2023 – July 2024
Minister of State for Defence Procurement	Alex Chalk	October 2022 – April 2023
Minister of State for Defence Procurement	James Cartlidge	April 2023 – July 2024
Parliamentary Under-Secretary of State for Defence People and Families	Andrew Murrison	October 2022 – July 2024

Digital, Culture, Media and Sport to February 2023 Culture, Media and Sport from February 2023
Secretary of State for Digital, Culture, Media and Sport	Michelle Donelan	September 2022 – February 2023
Secretary of State for Culture, Media and Sport	**Lucy Frazer**	February 2023 – July 2024
Minister of State for Media, Data, and Digital Infrastructure (Oct 2022 to Feb 2023); Minister of State for Media, Tourism and Creative Industries (from Feb 2023)	Julia Lopez	September 2022 – May 2023
Minister of State for Media, Data, and Digital Infrastructure (Oct 2022 to Feb 2023); Minister of State for Media, Tourism and Creative Industries (from Feb 2023)	Sir John Whittingdale (unpaid), (covering Julia Lopez's maternity leave)	May 2023 – December 2023
Minister of State for Media, Data, and Digital Infrastructure (Oct 2022 to Feb 2023); Minister of State for Media, Tourism and Creative Industries (from Feb 2023)	Julia Lopez	December 2023 – July 2024
Parliamentary Under-Secretary of State for Sport, Tourism and Civil Society, Minister for Equalities (Oct 2022 to Feb 2023); Parliamentary Under-Secretary of State for Sport, Gambling and Civil Society, Minister for Equalities (from Feb 2023)	Stuart Andrew	October 2022 – July 2024
Parliamentary Under-Secretary of State for Tech and the Digital Economy also Minister for London	Paul Scully	October 2022 – February 2023
Parliamentary Under-Secretary of State for Arts and Heritage and DCMS Lords Minister	Stephen Parkinson, Baron Parkinson of Whitley Bay	October 2022 – July 2024
Minister on leave	Julia Lopez	May 2023 – December 2023

Education
Secretary of State for Education	**Gillian Keegan**	October 2022 – July 2024
Minister of State for Skills, Apprenticeships and Higher Education	Robert Halfon	October 2022 – March 2024
Minister of State for Skills, Apprenticeships and Higher Education	Luke Hall	March 2024 – July 2024
Minister of State for Schools	Nick Gibb	October 2022 – November 2023
Minister of State for Schools	Damian Hinds	November 2023 – July 2024
Parliamentary Under-Secretary of State for Children, Families and Wellbeing	Claire Coutinho	October 2022 – August 2023
Parliamentary Under-Secretary of State for Children, Families and Wellbeing	David Johnston	August 2023 – July 2024
Parliamentary Under-Secretary of State for the School System and Student Finance	Diana Barran, Baroness Barran (unpaid)	September 2021 – July 2024

Energy Security and Net Zero
Secretary of State for Energy Security and Net Zero	Grant Shapps	February 2023 – August 2023
Secretary of State for Energy Security and Net Zero	**Claire Coutinho**	August 2023 – July 2024
Minister of State for Energy Security and Net Zero	Graham Stuart	February 2023 – April 2024
Minister of State for Energy Security and Net Zero	Justin Tomlinson	April 2024 – July 2024
Parliamentary Under-Secretary of State for Nuclear and Networks	Andrew Bowie	February 2023 – July 2024
Parliamentary Under-Secretary of State for Energy Consumers and Affordability	Amanda Solloway (unpaid, also a Whip)	February 2023 – July 2024
Parliamentary Under-Secretary of State for Energy Efficiency and Green Finance	Martin Callanan, Baron Callanan	February 2023 – July 2024

Environment, Food and Rural Affairs
Secretary of State for Environment, Food and Rural Affairs	Thérèse Coffey	October 2022 – November 2023
Secretary of State for Environment, Food and Rural Affairs	**Steve Barclay**	November 2023 – July 2024
Minister of State for Biosecurity, Marine and Rural Affairs	Richard Benyon, Baron Benyon (unpaid)	October 2022 – November 2023
Minister of State for Climate, Environment and Energy	Richard Benyon, Baron Benyon (unpaid), jointly with Foreign, Commonwealth and Development office	November 2023 – July 2024
Minister of State for Food, Farming and Fisheries	Mark Spencer	September 2022 – July 2024
Parliamentary Under Secretary of State for Natural Environment and Land Use	Trudy Harrison	September 2022 – November 2023
Parliamentary Under Secretary of State for Water and Rural Growth	Robbie Moore	November 2023 – July 2024
Parliamentary Under-Secretary of State for Environmental Quality and Resilience	Rebecca Pow	October 2022 – November 2023
Parliamentary Under-Secretary of State for Nature	Rebecca Pow	November 2023 – July 2024
Parliamentary Under-Secretary of State for Biosecurity, Animal Health and Welfare	Robbie Douglas-Miller, Baron Douglas-Miller (unpaid)	December 2023 – July 2024

Equalities Office
Minister for Women and Equalities	**Kemi Badenoch**	October 2022 – July 2024
Parliamentary Under-Secretary of State for Women	Maria Caulfield	October 2022 – July 2024
Parliamentary Under-Secretary of State for Equalities	Stuart Andrew	October 2022 – July 2024

Foreign, Commonwealth and Development Office
Secretary of State for Foreign, Commonwealth and Development Affairs	James Cleverly	September 2022 – November 2023
Secretary of State for Foreign, Commonwealth and Development Affairs	**David Cameron,** **Baron Cameron of Chipping Norton**	November 2023 – July 2024
Deputy Foreign Secretary	**Andrew Mitchell**	April 2024 – July 2024
Minister of State for Development and Africa	**Andrew Mitchell**	October 2022 – July 2024
Minister of State for the Middle East, North Africa, South Asia, (Commonwealth from November 2023) and the United Nations	Tariq Ahmad, Baron Ahmad of Wimbledon (unpaid)	June 2017 – July 2024
Minister of State for Overseas Territories, Commonwealth, Energy, Climate and Environment	Zac Goldsmith, Baron Goldsmith of Richmond Park (unpaid)	September 2022 – June 2023
Minister of State for Climate, Environment and Energy	Richard Benyon, Baron Benyon (unpaid, jointly with Environment, Food and Rural Affairs)	November 2023 – July 2024
Minister of State for Indo-Pacific	Anne-Marie Trevelyan	October 2022 – July 2024
Minister of State for Europe	Nus Ghani	March 2024 – July 2024
Parliamentary Under-Secretary of State for Americas and Caribbean	David Rutley	October 2022 – November 2023
Parliamentary Under-Secretary of State for Americas and Caribbean and Overseas Terrorities	David Rutley	November 2023 – July 2024
Parliamentary Under Secretary of State for Europe	Leo Docherty	October 2022 – March 2024

Health and Social Care
Secretary of State for Health and Social Care	Steve Barclay	October 2022 – November 2023
Secretary of State for Health and Social Care	**Victoria Atkins**	November 2023 – July 2024
Minister of State for Social Care	Helen Whately	October 2022 – July 2024
Minister of State for Health and Secondary Care	Will Quince	September 2022 – November 2023
Minister of State for Health and Secondary Care	Andrew Stephenson	November 2023 – July 2024
Parliamentary Under-Secretary of State for Primary Care and Public Health	Neil O'Brien	September 2022 – November 2023
Parliamentary Under-Secretary of State for Public Health, Start for Life and Primary Care	Andrea Leadsom	November 2023 – July 2024
Parliamentary Under Secretary of State for Health and Social Care, Minister for the Lords	Nick Markham, Baron Markham (unpaid)	September 2022 – July 2024
Parliamentary Under Secretary of State for Mental Health and Women's Health Strategy	Maria Caulfield	October 2022 – July 2024

Home Office
Secretary of State for the Home Department	Suella Braverman	October 2022 – November 2023
Secretary of State for the Home Department	**James Cleverly**	November 2023 – July 2024
Minister of State for Security	**Tom Tugendhat**	September 2022 – July 2024
Minister of State for Immigration	Robert Jenrick	October 2022 – December 2023
Minister of State for Countering Illegal Migration	**Michael Tomlinson**	December 2023 – July 2024
Minister of State for Legal Migration and the Border	Tom Pursglove	December 2023 – July 2024
Minister of State for Crime, Policing and Fire	Chris Philp	October 2022 – July 2024
Parliamentary Under Secretary of State for the Home Department	Andrew Sharpe, Baron Sharpe of Epsom	September 2022 – July 2024
Parliamentary Under Secretary of State for Safeguarding	Sarah Dines	October 2022 – November 2023
Parliamentary Under Secretary of State for Migration and Borders	Simon Murray, Baron Murray of Blidworth	October 2022 – November 2023
Parliamentary Under Secretary of State for Victims and Safeguarding	Laura Farris (jointly with Justice)	November 2023 – July 2024

International Trade (Department dissolved February 2023 to form Business and Trade)
Secretary of State for International Trade; President of the Board of Trade	**Kemi Badenoch** also Minister for Women and Equalities	September 2022 – February 2023
Minister of State for Trade Policy	Greg Hands	October 2022 – February 2023
Minister of State for Investment	Dominic Johnson, Baron Johnson of Lainston (unpaid)	November 2022 – February 2023
Parliamentary Under-Secretary of State for Exports	Andrew Bowie	October 2022 – February 2023
Parliamentary Under-Secretary of State for International Trade	Nigel Huddleston (paid as a whip)	October 2022 – February 2023
Parliamentary Under Secretary for Equalities	Stuart Andrew	October 2022 – February 2023
Parliamentary Under-Secretary of State for Women	Maria Caulfield	October 2022 – February 2023

Justice
Deputy Prime Minister	Dominic Raab	October 2022 – April 2023
Secretary of State for Justice; Lord High Chancellor of Great Britain	Dominic Raab	October 2022 – April 2023
Secretary of State for Justice; Lord High Chancellor of Great Britain	**Alex Chalk**	April 2023 – July 2024
Minister of State for Prisons, Parole and Probation	Damian Hinds	October 2022 – November 2023
Minister of State for Prisons, Parole and Probation	Edward Argar	November 2023 – July 2024
Minister of State for Victims and Sentencing	Edward Argar	October 2022 – November 2023
Parliamentary Under-Secretary of State for Justice	Christopher Bellamy, Baron Bellamy (unpaid)	June 2022 – July 2024
Parliamentary Under Secretary of State for Courts and Legal Services	Mike Freer	September 2022 – July 2024
Parliamentary Under Secretary of State for Sentencing	Gareth Bacon	November 2023 – July 2024
Parliamentary Under-Secretary of State for Victims and Safeguarding	Laura Farris (jointly with Home Office)	November 2023 – July 2024

Levelling Up, Housing and Communities
Secretary of State for Levelling Up, Housing and Communities; Minister for Intergovernmental Relations	**Michael Gove**	October 2022 – July 2024
Minister of State for Housing and Planning	Lucy Frazer	October 2022 – February 2023
Minister of State for Housing and Planning	Rachel Maclean	February 2023 – November 2023
Minister of State for Housing, Planning and Building Safety	Lee Rowley	November 2023 – July 2024
Parliamentary Under-Secretary of State for Local Government and Building Safety	Lee Rowley	September 2022 – November 2023
Parliamentary Under Secretary of State for Levelling Up	Dehenna Davison	September 2022 – September 2023
Parliamentary Under Secretary of State for Levelling Up	Jacob Young	September 2023 – July 2024
Parliamentary Under-Secretary of State for Housing and Homelessness	Felicity Buchan	October 2022 – July 2024
Parliamentary Under Secretary of State for Faith & Communities and Lords Minister	Jane Scott, Baroness Scott of Bybrook	September 2022 – November 2023
Parliamentary Under Secretary of State for Social Housing & Faith and Lords Minister	Jane Scott, Baroness Scott of Bybrook	November 2024 – July 2024
Parliamentary Under-Secretary of State for Local Government	Simon Hoare	November 2023 – July 2024
Parliamentary Under-Secretary of State for Housing and Communities	Joanna Penn, Baroness Penn	November 2023 – March 2024
Parliamentary Under-Secretary of State for Housing and Communities	Kay Swinburne, Baroness Swinburne (covering Baroness Penn's maternity leave)	March 2024 – July 2024
Minister on leave	Joanna Penn, Baroness Penn	March 2024 – present

Northern Ireland Office
Secretary of State for Northern Ireland	**Chris Heaton-Harris**	September 2022 – July 2024
Minister of State for Northern Ireland	Steve Baker	September 2022 – July 2024
Parliamentary Under-Secretary of State for Northern Ireland	Jonathan Caine, Baron Caine (unpaid, also a whip Lord in Waiting from November 2022)	November 2021 – July 2024

Science, Innovation and Technology
Secretary of State for Science, Innovation and Technology	**Michelle Donelan**	February 2023 – April 2023
Secretary of State for Science, Innovation and Technology	Chloe Smith (covering Michelle Donelan's maternity leave)	April 2023 – July 2023
Secretary of State for Science, Innovation and Technology	**Michelle Donelan**	July 2023 – July 2024
Minister of State for Science, Research and Innovation	George Freeman	February 2023 – November 2023
Minister of State for Science, Research and Innovation	Andrew Griffith (unpaid)	November 2023 – July 2024
Minister of State for Data and Digital Infrastructure	Julia Lopez	March 2023 – May 2023
Minister of State for Data and Digital Infrastructure	Sir John Whittingdale (unpaid) (covering Julia Lopez's maternity leave)	May 2023 – December 2023
Minister of State for Data and Digital Infrastructure	Julia Lopez	December 2023 – July 2024
Parliamentary Under-Secretary of State for Tech and the Digital Economy	Paul Scully also Minister for London	February 2023 – November 2023
Parliamentary Under-Secretary of State for Tech and the Digital Economy	Saqib Bhatti	November 2023 – July 2024
Parliamentary Under-Secretary of State for AI and Intellectual Property	Jonathan Berry, 5th Viscount Camrose (unpaid)	March 2023 – July 2024
Minister on Leave	Michelle Donelan	April 2023 – July 2023
Minister on Leave	Julia Lopez	May 2023 – December 2023

Scotland Office
Secretary of State for Scotland	**Sir Alister Jack**	July 2019 – July 2024
Parliamentary Under-Secretary of State for Scotland	John Lamont	October 2022 – July 2024
Parliamentary Under-Secretary of State for Scotland	Malcolm Offord, Baron Offord of Garvel (unpaid, jointly with Business and Trade from April 2023)	October 2021 – February 2024
Parliamentary Under-Secretary of State for Scotland	Donald Cameron, Baron Cameron of Lochiel	February 2024 – July 2024

Transport
Secretary of State for Transport	**Mark Harper**	October 2022 – July 2024
Minister of State for Decarbonisation and Technology	Jesse Norman	October 2022 – November 2023
Minister of State for Rail and HS2	Huw Merriman	October 2022 – July 2024
Parliamentary Under-Secretary of State for Aviation, Maritime and Security	Charlotte Vere, Baroness Vere of Norbiton	April 2019 – November 2023
Parliamentary Under Secretary of State for Roads and Local Transport	Richard Holden	October 2022 – November 2023
Parliamentary Under Secretary of State for Roads and Local Transport	Guy Opperman	November 2023 – July 2024
Parliamentary Under-Secretary of State for Decarbonisation and Technology	Anthony Browne	November 2023 – July 2024
Parliamentary Under-Secretary of State for Transport	Byron Davies Baron Davies of Gower	November 2023 – July 2024

Treasury
Chancellor of the Exchequer; Second Lord of the Treasury	**Jeremy Hunt**	October 2022 – July 2024
Chief Secretary to the Treasury	John Glen (unpaid)	October 2022 – November 2023
Chief Secretary to the Treasury	**Laura Trott**	November 2023 – July 2024
Financial Secretary to the Treasury	Victoria Atkins	October 2022 – November 2023
Financial Secretary to the Treasury	Nigel Huddleston	November 2023 – July 2024
Economic Secretary to the Treasury	Andrew Griffith	October 2022 – November 2023
Economic Secretary to the Treasury	Bim Afolami	November 2023 – July 2024
Exchequer Secretary to the Treasury	James Cartlidge	October 2022 – April 2023
Exchequer Secretary to the Treasury	Gareth Davies	April 2023 – July 2024
Parliamentary Secretary, Treasury Lords Minister	Joanna Penn, Baroness Penn	October 2022 – November 2023
Parliamentary Secretary, Treasury Lords Minister	Charlotte Vere, Baroness Vere of Norbiton	November 2023 – July 2024

Wales Office
Secretary of State for Wales	**David TC Davies**	October 2022 – July 2024
Parliamentary Under-Secretary of State	James Davies	October 2022 – November 2023
Parliamentary Under-Secretary of State	Fay Jones	November 2023 – July 2024

Work and Pensions
Secretary of State for Work and Pensions	**Mel Stride**	October 2022 – July 2024
Minister of State for Employment	Guy Opperman	October 2022 – November 2023
Minister of State for Employment	Jo Churchill	November 2023 – July 2024
Minister of State for Disabled People, Health and Work	Tom Pursglove	October 2022 – December 2023
Minister of State for Disabled People, Health and Work	Mims Davies	April 2024 – July 2024
Parliamentary Under-Secretary of State for Social Mobility, Youth and Progression	Mims Davies	October 2022 – December 2023
Parliamentary Under-Secretary of State for Disabled People, Health and Work	Mims Davies	December 2023 – April 2024
Parliamentary Under-Secretary of State for Pensions	Laura Trott	October 2022 – November 2023
Parliamentary Under-Secretary of State for Pensions	Paul Maynard	November 2023 – July 2024
Parliamentary Under Secretary of State for Work and Pensions, Minister for Lords	Deborah Stedman-Scott, Baroness Stedman-Scott	October 2022 – January 2023
Parliamentary Under Secretary of State for Work and Pensions, Minister for Lords	James Younger, 5th Viscount Younger of Leckie	January 2023 – July 2024

=== Law officers ===
Attorney General's Office
Attorney General for England and Wales	**Victoria Prentis**	October 2022 – July 2024
Solicitor General for England and Wales	Michael Tomlinson	September 2022 – December 2023
Solicitor General for England and Wales	Robert Courts	December 2023 – July 2024

Office of the Advocate General
Advocate General for Scotland	Keith Stewart, Baron Stewart of Dirleton	October 2020 – July 2024

=== Parliament ===
House Leaders
Leader of the House of Lords; Lord Keeper of the Privy Seal	**Nicholas True, Baron True**	September 2022 – July 2024
Leader of the House of Commons; Lord President of the Council	**Penny Mordaunt**	September 2022 – July 2024
Deputy Leader of the House of Lords	Frederick Curzon, 7th Earl Howe (unpaid)	May 2015 – July 2024

House of Commons Whips
Title	MP	Department	Term
Chief Whip of the House of Commons; Parliamentary Secretary to the Treasury	**Simon Hart**		October 2022 – July 2024
Deputy Chief Whip; Treasurer of HM Household	Marcus Jones		October 2022 – July 2024
Senior Whip; Comptroller of HM Household	Rebecca Harris	FCDO and AGO	July 2022 – July 2024
Senior Whip; Vice-Chamberlain of the Household	Jo Churchill	DWP	September 2022 – November 2023
Senior Whip; Vice-Chamberlain of the Household	Stuart Anderson		November 2023 – July 2024
Whips; Lords Commissioners of the Treasury	Nigel Huddleston (paid as a whip)		September 2022 – February 2023
Whips; Lords Commissioners of the Treasury	Amanda Solloway (paid as a whip, also with Energy Security and Net Zero)	DHSC	September 2022 – July 2024
Whips; Lords Commissioners of the Treasury	Andrew Stephenson	HM Treasury	October 2022 – November 2023
Whips; Lords Commissioners of the Treasury	Scott Mann	HO and MoJ	October 2022 – July 2024
Whips; Lords Commissioners of the Treasury	Steve Double	MoD	October 2022 – November 2023
Whips; Lords Commissioners of the Treasury	Ruth Edwards		February 2023
Whips; Lords Commissioners of the Treasury	Stuart Anderson		February 2023 – November 2023
Whips; Lords Commissioners of the Treasury	Dame Amanda Milling		November 2023 – July 2024
Whips; Lords Commissioners of the Treasury	Joy Morrissey		November 2023 – July 2024
Whips; Lords Commissioners of the Treasury	Mike Wood		November 2023 – July 2024
Assistant Whips	Joy Morrissey	BEIS and DfE	July 2022 – November 2023
Assistant Whips	Stuart Anderson		July 2022 – February 2023
Assistant Whips	Jacob Young	DLUHC and DfT	September 2022 – September 2023
Assistant Whips	Fay Jones	Defra	October 2022 – November 2023
Assistant Whips	Julie Marson	Cabinet Office	October 2022 – November 2023
Assistant Whips	Robert Largan		October 2022 – July 2024
Assistant Whips	Mike Wood	DIT and DCMS	October 2022 – November 2023
Assistant Whips	Ruth Edwards		February 2023 – April 2024
Assistant Whips	Gagan Mohindra		September 2023 – July 2024
Assistant Whips	Aaron Bell		November 2023 – July 2024
Assistant Whips	Mark Fletcher		November 2023 – July 2024
Assistant Whips	Mark Jenkinson		November 2023 – July 2024
Assistant Whips	Suzanne Webb		November 2023 – July 2024
Assistant Whips	Paul Holmes		April 2024 – July 2024

House of Lords Whips
Captain of the Honourable Corps of Gentlemen-at-Arms; Chief Whip of the House of Lords	Susan Williams, Baroness Williams of Trafford	September 2022 – July 2024
Captain of the Yeomen of the Guard; Deputy Chief Whip	Patrick Stopford, 9th Earl of Courtown	July 2016 – July 2024
Whips; Baronesses and Lords in waiting	Olivia Bloomfield, Baroness Bloomfield of Hinton Waldrish	July 2019 – June 2023
Whips; Baronesses and Lords in waiting	James Younger, 5th Viscount Younger of Leckie	February 2020 – January 2023
Whips; Baronesses and Lords in waiting	Byron Davies, Baron Davies of Gower	September 2022 – November 2023
Whips; Baronesses and Lords in waiting	Jasset Ormsby-Gore, 7th Baron Harlech	September 2022 – July 2024
Whips; Baronesses and Lords in waiting	Jonathan Caine, Baron Caine (unpaid, also a PUSS in the Northern Ireland Office)	November 2022 – July 2024
Whips; Baronesses and Lords in waiting	Graham Evans, Baron Evans of Rainow	January 2023 – July 2024
Whips; Baronesses and Lords in waiting	Kay Swinburne, Baroness Swinburne (unpaid)	June 2023 – March 2024
Whips; Baronesses and Lords in waiting	Darren Mott, Baron Mott	June 2023 – November 2023
Whips; Baronesses and Lords in waiting	Benjamin Gascoigne, Baron Gascoigne	November 2023 – July 2024
Whips; Baronesses and Lords in waiting	Massey Lopes, 4th Baron Roborough (unpaid)	December 2023 – July 2024

== 2023 August mini-reshuffle ==
On 31 August 2023, Sunak carried out a mini-reshuffle. Ben Wallace resigned as Secretary of State for Defence and was replaced by Secretary of State for Energy Security and Net Zero Grant Shapps. Shapps was replaced by Parliamentary Under-Secretary of State for Children, Families and Wellbeing Claire Coutinho. The new children's minister was announced as backbencher MP David Johnston.

== 2024 March mini-reshuffle ==
On 26 March 2024, Sunak carried out a mini-reshuffle. Robert Halfon resigned as Minister of State for Skills, Apprenticeships and Higher Education and was replaced by Luke Hall. James Heappey resigned as Minister of State for the Armed Forces and was replaced by Leo Docherty. Nus Ghani was appointed the new Minister of State for Europe in the Foreign, Commonwealth and Development Office. Kevin Hollinrake was promoted to minister of state in the Department for Business and Trade but kept his responsibility for the postal affairs portfolio. Alan Mak was promoted to being a parliamentary Under-Secretary of State jointly in the Department for Business and Trade and the Cabinet Office. In terms of internal appointments to the Conservative Party, backbench MPs Jonathan Gullis and Angela Richardson were made deputy party chairs.

== Departures from the Sunak ministry ==
This is a list of departures from the Sunak ministry since forming a government on 25 October 2022. This list omits ministers who were invited to leave the government during the November 2023 cabinet reshuffle.

=== Ministers ===
Minister (Cabinet members shown in bold)	Office	Date of resignation	Reason
**Sir Gavin Williamson**	Minister of State without Portfolio	8 November 2022	Resigned to avoid being a distraction for the government and to concentrate on clearing his name after allegations of bullying.
Deborah Stedman-Scott, Baroness Stedman-Scott	Parliamentary Under-Secretary of State for Work and Pensions	1 January 2023	Personal reasons.
**Nadhim Zahawi**	Chairman of the Conservative Party; Minister without Portfolio	29 January 2023	Dismissed over breaching the Ministerial Code following revelations over his tax affairs.
**Dominic Raab**	Deputy Prime Minister; Secretary of State for Justice; Lord Chancellor	21 April 2023	Resigned following bullying probe.
Olivia Bloomfield, Baroness Bloomfield of Hinton Waldrist	Baroness in Waiting	2 June 2023	Resigned for unspecified reasons.
Robin Millar	PPS to the Secretary of State for Scotland and the Secretary of State for Wales	29 June 2023	Resigned in opposition to changes to the sex education curriculum in Northern Ireland.
Zac Goldsmith, Baron Goldsmith of Richmond Park	Minister of State for Overseas Territories, Commonwealth, Energy, Climate and Environment	30 June 2023	Resigned after being accused of undermining the Privileges Committee investigation into Boris Johnson.
**Ben Wallace**	Secretary of State for Defence	31 August 2023	Resigned having announced his departure from the government prior to the next cabinet reshuffle.
Dehenna Davison	Parliamentary Under-Secretary of State for Levelling Up	18 September 2023	Health reasons; chronic migraine.
Paul Bristow	PPS at the Department for Science, Innovation and Technology	30 October 2023	Dismissed after calling for an immediate ceasefire in the Gaza war.
**Robert Jenrick**	Minister of State for Immigration	6 December 2023	Resigned over the Rwanda policy.
Jane Stevenson	PPS to the Secretary of State for Business and Trade	16 January 2024	Resigned over the Rwanda policy.
James Heappey	Minister of State for the Armed Forces	26 March 2024	Resigned
Robert Halfon	Minister of State for Skills, Apprenticeships and Higher Education	26 March 2024	Resigned
Graham Stuart	Minister of State for Energy Security and Net Zero	12 April 2024	Resigned
Ruth Edwards	Assistant Whip	25 April 2024	Leaves the Government

== Non-ministerial appointments ==
=== Parliamentary Private Secretaries ===
Office or ministerial team	Incumbent	Parliamentary Private Secretary	Tenure
Office of the Prime Minister
Parliamentary Private Secretary to the Prime Minister	Rishi Sunak	Craig Williams	October 2022 – July 2024
Parliamentary Private Secretary to the Deputy Prime Minister	Dominic Raab	Laura Farris	October 2022 – July 2024
Cabinet Office
Parliamentary Private Secretary to the Chancellor of the Duchy of Lancaster	Oliver Dowden	Peter Gibson	October 2022 – July 2024
Parliamentary Private Secretary to the Minister for the Cabinet Office and Paymaster General	Jeremy Quin	James Daly	October 2022 – July 2024
Parliamentary Private Secretary to the Minister without Portfolio and Chairman of the Conservative Party	Nadhim Zahawi	Ben Spencer	October 2022 – July 2024
Parliamentary Private Secretary to the Cabinet Office		Ruth Edwards	October 2022 – July 2024
Department for Health and Social Care
Parliamentary Private Secretary to the Secretary of State for Health and Social Care	Steve Barclay	Angela Richardson	October 2022 – July 2024
Parliamentary Private Secretary to the Department for Health and Social Care		Duncan Baker	October 2022 – July 2024
HM Treasury
Parliamentary Private Secretary to the Chancellor of the Exchequer	Jeremy Hunt	Gareth Davies	October 2022 – July 2024
Parliamentary Private Secretary to the Chief Secretary to the Treasury	John Glen	Anthony Mangnall	October 2022 – July 2024
Parliamentary Private Secretary to HM Treasury		Paul Howell	October 2022 – July 2024
Foreign, Commonwealth and Development Office
Parliamentary Private Secretary to the Secretary of State for Foreign, Commonwealth and Development Affairs	James Cleverly	Gagan Mohindra	October 2022 – July 2024
Parliamentary Private Secretary to the Foreign, Commonwealth and Development Office		Cherilyn Mackrory	October 2022 – July 2024
Home Office
Parliamentary Private Secretary to the Secretary of State for the Home Department	Suella Braverman	James Sunderland	October 2022 – July 2024
Parliamentary Private Secretary to the Home Office		Shaun Bailey	October 2022 – July 2024
Ministry of Justice
Parliamentary Private Secretary to the Lord Chancellor and Secretary of State for Justice	Dominic Raab	Gareth Bacon	October 2022 – July 2024
Parliamentary Private Secretary to the Ministry of Justice		Aaron Bell	October 2022 – July 2024
Ministry of Defence
Parliamentary Private Secretary to the Secretary of State for Defence	Ben Wallace	Ian Levy	October 2022 – July 2024
Parliamentary Private Secretary to the Ministry of Defence		Mark Eastwood	October 2022 – July 2024
Department for Levelling Up, Housing and Communities
Parliamentary Private Secretary to the Secretary of State for Levelling Up, Housing and Communities and Minister for Intergovernmental Relations	Michael Gove	David Johnston	October 2022 – July 2024
Parliamentary Private Secretary to the Department for Levelling Up, Housing and Communities		David Johnston	October 2022 – July 2024
Department for Business, Energy and Industrial Strategy
Parliamentary Private Secretary to the Secretary of State for Business, Energy and Industrial Strategy	Grant Shapps	Luke Evans	October 2022 – July 2024
Parliamentary Private Secretary to the Department for Business, Energy and Industrial Strategy		Jane Stevenson	October 2022 – January 2024
Department for International Trade
Parliamentary Private Secretary to the Secretary of State for International Trade, President of the Board of Trade and Minister for Equalities	Kemi Badenoch	Alexander Stafford	October 2022 – July 2024
Parliamentary Private Secretary to the Department for International Trade		Alexander Stafford	October 2022 – July 2024
Department for Work and Pensions
Parliamentary Private Secretary to the Secretary of State for Work and Pensions	Mel Stride	James Wild	October 2022 – July 2024
Parliamentary Private Secretary to the Department for Work and Pensions		Mark Logan	October 2022 – July 2024
Department for Education
Parliamentary Private Secretary to the Secretary of State for Education	Gillian Keegan	Suzanne Webb	October 2022 – July 2024
Parliamentary Private Secretary to the Department for Education		Robbie Moore	October 2022 – July 2024
Department for Environment, Food and Rural Affairs
Parliamentary Private Secretary to the Secretary of State for Environment, Food and Rural Affairs	Thérèse Coffey	Jerome Mayhew	October 2022 – July 2024
Parliamentary Private Secretary to the Department for Environment, Food and Rural Affairs		Jerome Mayhew	October 2022 – July 2024
Department for Transport
Parliamentary Private Secretary to the Secretary of State for Transport	Mark Harper	Simon Jupp	October 2022 – July 2024
Parliamentary Private Secretary to the Department for Transport		Kieran Mullan	October 2022 – July 2024
Northern Ireland Office
Parliamentary Private Secretary to the Secretary of State for Northern Ireland	Chris Heaton-Harris	Tom Hunt	October 2022 – July 2024
Parliamentary Private Secretary to the Northern Ireland Office			October 2022 – July 2024
Office of the Secretary of State for Scotland
Parliamentary Private Secretary to the Secretary of State for Scotland	Alister Jack	Robin Millar (shared)	October 2022 – June 2023
Office of the Secretary of State for Wales
Parliamentary Private Secretary to the Secretary of State for Wales	David TC Davies	Robin Millar (shared)	October 2022 – June 2023
Department for Digital, Culture, Media and Sport
Parliamentary Private Secretary to the Secretary of State for Digital, Culture, Media and Sport	Michelle Donelan	Paul Bristow	October 2022 – July 2024
Parliamentary Private Secretary to the Department for Digital, Culture, Media and Sport		Simon Baynes	October 2022 – July 2024
Parliamentary House Leaders
Parliamentary Private Secretary to the Leader of the House of Commons and Lord President of the Council	Penny Mordaunt	Nicola Richards	October 2022 – July 2024
Parliamentary Private Secretary to the Leader of the House of Lords and Lord Privy Seal	The Lord True	Chris Clarkson	October 2022 – July 2024
Attorney General's Office
Parliamentary Private Secretary to the Attorney General for England and Wales and Advocate General for Northern Ireland	Victoria Prentis	Anna Firth	October 2022 – July 2024

=== Prime Minister's Office ===
Prime Minister's Office
Principal Private Secretary to the Prime Minister	Elizabeth Perelman	October 2022 – July 2024
Downing Street Chief of Staff	Liam Booth-Smith	October 2022 – July 2024
Downing Street Director of Communications	Amber de Botton	October 2022 – September 2023
Downing Street Director of Communications	Nerissa Chesterfield	September 2023 – July 2024
Downing Street Press Secretary	Nerissa Chesterfield	October 2022 – September 2023
Downing Street Press Secretary	Lucy Noakes	September 2023 – July 2024
Prime Minister's Official Spokesperson	Max Blain	April 2021 – July 2024
Political Secretary to the Prime Minister	James Forsyth	December 2022 – July 2024
Director of Strategy	Jamie Njoku-Goodwin	October 2022 – July 2024
Director of the Number 10 Policy Unit	Eleanor Shawcross	October 2022 – July 2024

=== Second Church Estates Commissioner ===
Commissioner
Second Church Estates Commissioner	Andrew Selous	January 2020 – July 2024

Preceded by Truss ministry	Government of the United Kingdom; 2022–2024	Succeeded by Starmer ministry
