= Alan Mak =

Alan Mak may refer to:

- Alan Mak (director) (born 1968), Hong Kong film director
- Alan Mak (politician) (born 1983), British Member of Parliament
