= Parliamentary Under-Secretary of State for Reindustrialisation =

Ministerial position in the UK Government

United Kingdom Parliamentary Under-Secretary of State for Reindustrialisation
- Royal Arms of His Majesty's Government

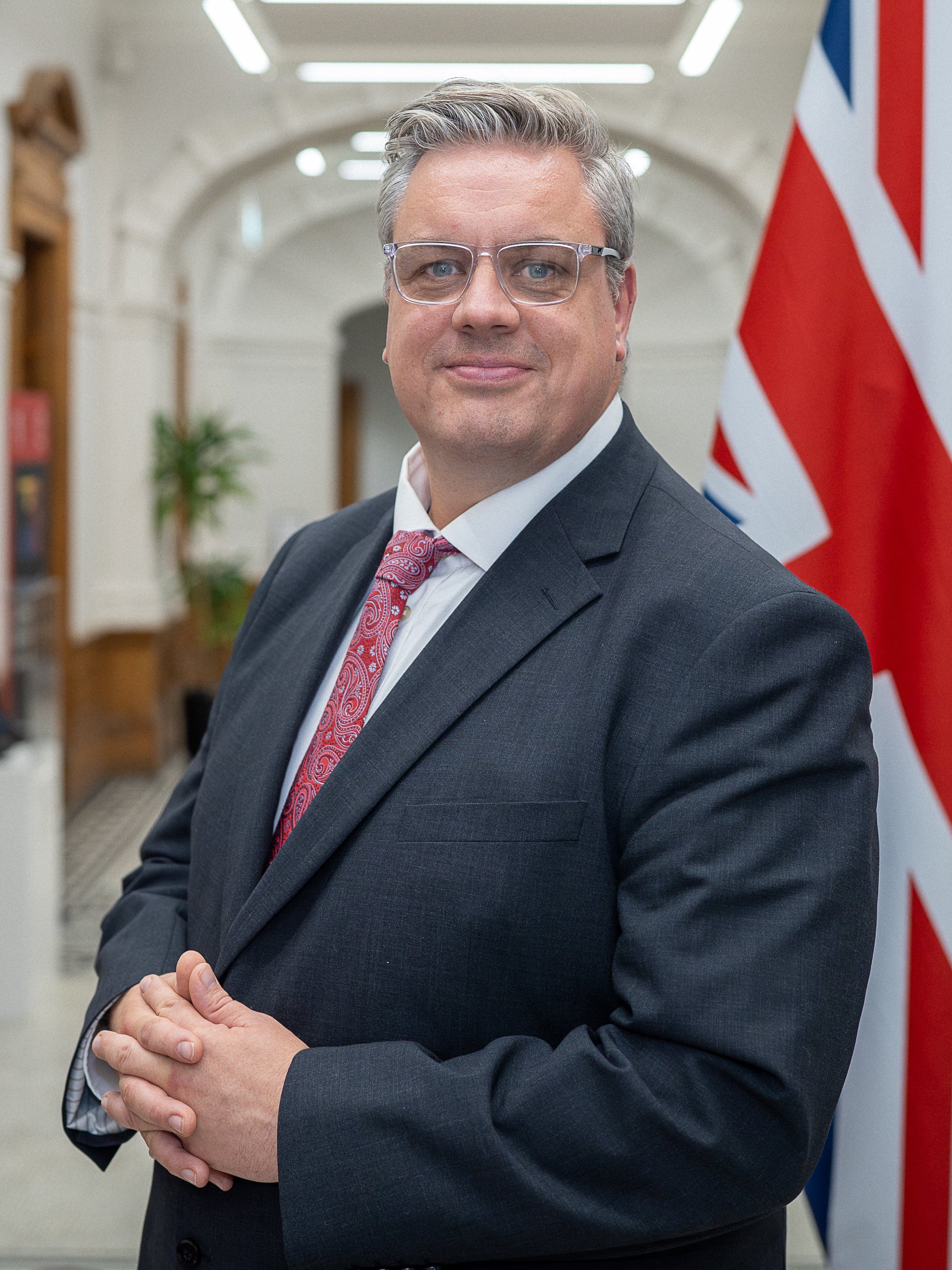
- Incumbent; Blair McDougall since 22 July 2026
- Department for Business, Innovation, Science and Trade; Department for Energy Security and Net Zero
- Style: Minister
- Type: Minister of the Crown
- Status: Minister of State
- Member of: His Majesty's Government
- Reports to: Secretary of State for Business and Trade; Secretary of State for Energy Security and Net Zero
- Seat: Westminster
- Nominator: Prime Minister
- Appointer: The Monarch; (on the advice of the Prime Minister)
- Term length: At His Majesty's pleasure
- Website: www.gov.uk/government/ministers/parliamentary-under-secretary-of-state-minister-for-reindustrialisation

The parliamentary under-secretary of state for reindustrialisation is a junior ministerial role in the Department for Business, Innovation, Science and Trade and Department for Energy Security and Net Zero of His Majesty's Government. It has been held by Blair McDougall since 22 July 2026.

Since 2024, the minister has belonged to two government departments.

== Responsibilities ==
Responsibilities of the Minister of State for Industry in DBT include:

(DBT responsibilities)

- TBD

(DESNZ responsibilities)

- Industrial energy affordability (joint with the Minister for Energy Consumers)
- Clean energy industry strategy
- Refineries
- Industrial decarbonisation and fuel switching
- Emissions trading
- Carbon leakage
- Mineworkers pensions

== List of Ministers ==
Name	Portrait	Term of office		Party	Ministry
Minister of State for Industry and Energy
Brian Wilson		11 June 2001	13 June 2003	Labour	Blair (II)
Minister of State for Industry and the Regions
Jacqui Smith		13 June 2003	6 May 2005	Labour	Blair (II)
Alun Michael		10 May 2005	5 May 2006	Labour Co-op	Blair (III)
Margaret Hodge		5 May 2006	27 June 2007	Labour	Blair (III)
Minister of State for Small Business, Industry and Enterprise
Anna Soubry		11 May 2015	15 July 2016	Conservative	Cameron (II)
Parliamentary Under-Secretary of State for Industry and Energy
Jesse Norman		18 July 2016	14 June 2017	Conservative	May (I)
Parliamentary Under-Secretary of State for Business and Industry
Richard Harrington		14 June 2017	25 March 2019	Conservative	May (II)
Andrew Stephenson		4 April 2019	25 July 2019	Conservative	May (II)
Nadhim Zahawi		25 July 2019	15 September 2021	Conservative	Johnson (I)
Nadhim Zahawi		25 July 2019	15 September 2021	Conservative	Johnson (II)
Lee Rowley		17 September 2021	6 July 2022	Conservative	Johnson (II)
Minister of State for Industry
Jackie Doyle-Price		7 September 2022	27 October 2022	Conservative	Truss
Minister of State for Industry and Investment Security
Nus Ghani		27 October 2022	7 February 2023	Conservative	Sunak
Minister of State for Industry and Economic Security Also Minister of State for the Investment Security Unit
Nus Ghani		7 February 2023	26 March 2024	Conservative	Sunak
Parliamentary Under-Secretary of State for Industry and Economic Security Also Parliamentary Under-Secretary of State for the Investment Security Unit
Alan Mak		26 March 2024	5 July 2024	Conservative	Sunak
Minister of State for Industry
Sarah Jones		8 July 2024	6 September 2025	Labour	Starmer
Parliamentary Under-Secretary of State for Industry
Chris McDonald		11 September 2025	22 July 2026	Labour	Starmer
Parliamentary Under-Secretary of State for Reindustrialisation
Blair McDougall		22 July 2026	Incumbent	Labour	Burnham

== Minister for the Investment Security Unit ==
United Kingdom Parliamentary Under-Secretary for the Investment Security Unit
- Royal Arms of His Majesty's Government
- Incumbent; Vacant since 5 July 2024
- Cabinet Office
- Style: The Right Honourable (within the UK and Commonwealth)
- Type: Minister of the Crown
- Status: Minister of State
- Member of: His Majesty's Government
- Reports to: Chancellor of the Duchy of Lancaster; Secretary of State in the Cabinet Office
- Seat: Westminster
- Nominator: Prime Minister
- Appointer: The Monarch; (on the advice of the Prime Minister)
- Term length: At His Majesty's pleasure
- Salary: £115,824 per annum (2022) (including £86,584 MP salary)

Following the reorganisation of government departments in February 2023 the minister in charge of the Investment Security Unit was moved from the Department for Business, Energy and Industrial Strategy to the Cabinet Office.

The Investment Security Unit is responsible for identifying, addressing and mitigating national security risks to the UK arising when a person gains control of a qualifying asset or qualifying entity as set out in the National Security and Investment Act.

=== Ministers ===
Name	Portrait	Term of office		Ministry
Minister of State for the Investment Security Unit
Nus Ghani		7 February 2023	26 March 2024	Sunak
Parliamentary Under-Secretary of State for the Investment Security Unit
Alan Mak		26 March 2024	5 July 2024	Sunak
