= 2019-24 government =

2019-24 government could refer to:

- Sunak ministry
- Second Johnson ministry
- Second Modi ministry
