= Sarah Jones (politician) =

British politician (born 1972)

Sarah Jones MP
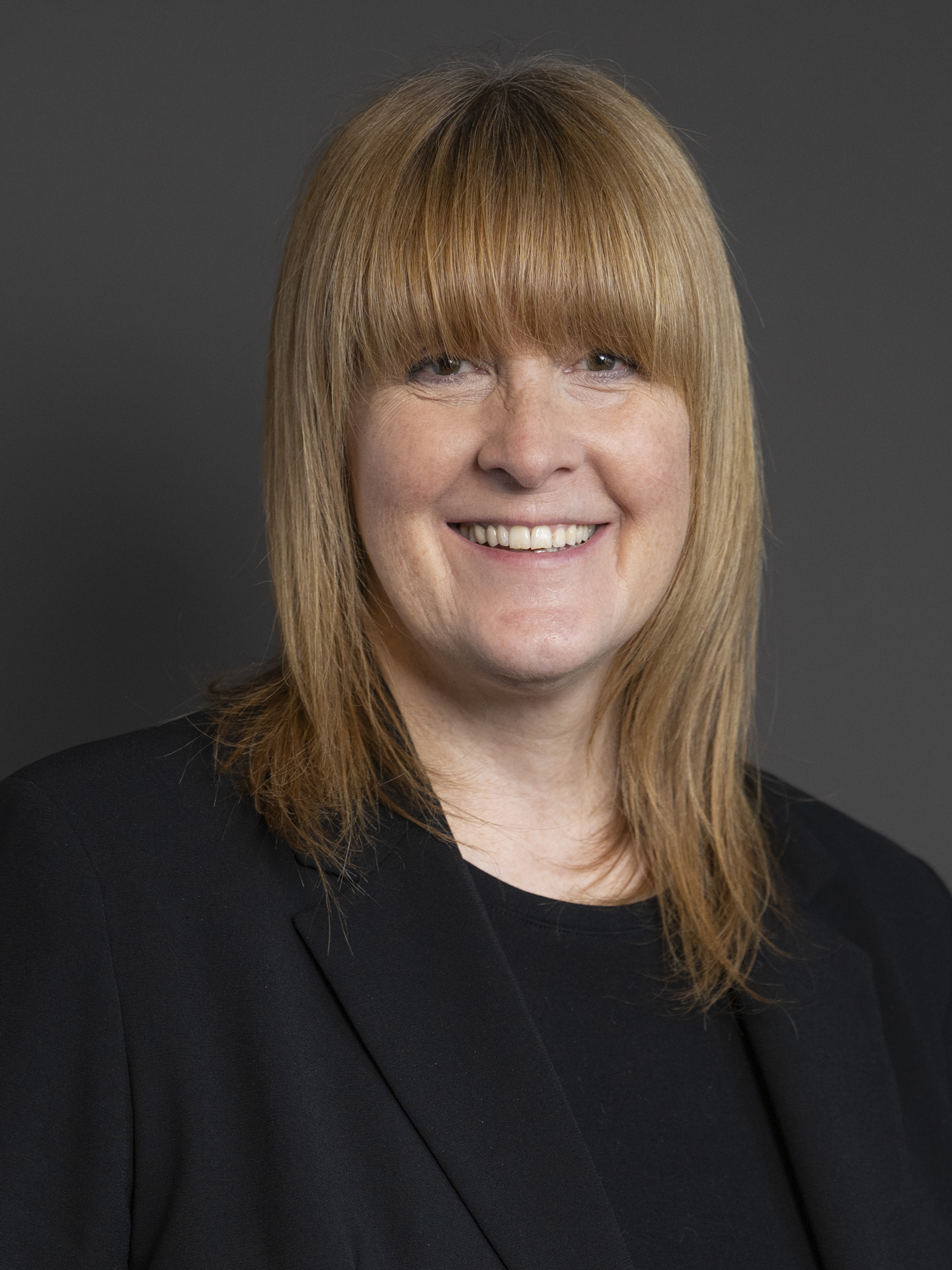
- Official portrait, 2024

Minister of State for Policing and Crime
- Incumbent
- Assumed office 6 September 2025
- Prime Minister: Keir Starmer; Andy Burnham
- Preceded by: Diana Johnson

Minister of State for Industry
- In office 8 July 2024 – 6 September 2025
- Prime Minister: Keir Starmer
- Preceded by: Alan Mak
- Succeeded by: Chris McDonald

Member of Parliament for Croydon West Croydon Central (2017–2024)
- Incumbent
- Assumed office 8 June 2017
- Preceded by: Gavin Barwell
- Majority: 14,226 (37.3%)
Shadow portfolios
2023–2024	Industry and Decarbonisation
2020–2023	Policing and the Fire Service
2018–2020	Housing

Personal details
- Born: Sarah Ann Jones; 20 December 1972 (age 53) Croydon, London, England
- Party: Labour
- Education: Durham University (BA)
- Website: sarah-jones.org

Sarah Ann Jones (born 20 December 1972) is a British Labour Party politician who has been Member of Parliament (MP) for Croydon West, formerly Croydon Central, since 2017. She has served as Minister of State for Policing and Crime since 6 September 2025.

Jones previously served as Shadow Minister for Industry and Decarbonisation and Shadow Minister for Policing and the Fire Service. She served as Minister of State for Industry from July 2024 to September 2025.

== Life and career ==
Jones was born in Croydon and is a lifelong resident. Jones' family have been in Croydon for generations. She was educated at the Old Palace School in Croydon and at Durham University, where she read history. She was a member of Trevelyan College.

Jones joined the Labour Party aged 19 in 1992 after watching Conservative Party MP Peter Lilley, then the Secretary of State at the Department of Social Security, make a speech to his party's annual conference where he attacked benefit claimants and women who allegedly become pregnant to gain council housing. Jones, who was pregnant at the time, joined the Labour Party as a direct reaction to the speech.

After leaving university Jones worked for Mo Mowlam, Labour Member of Parliament for Redcar and Secretary of State for Northern Ireland. Jones worked briefly as a Press Officer for the Labour Party during the 1997 general election. Jones later became Head of Campaigns at the housing charity Shelter. During that time Shelter won the PR award for best public affairs campaign. She was later appointed Head of Public Affairs for the NHS Confederation.

Jones served as a senior civil servant and was part of the team delivering the 2012 London Olympic and Paralympic Games. Jones worked with Tessa Jowell, who was Minister for the Olympics at the time, and continued as a senior civil servant under Jeremy Hunt, the then Secretary of State for Culture, Olympics, Media and Sport.

After leaving the Civil Service in 2012, Jones worked in a series of roles in the public and private sector, including at Gatwick Airport, where she campaigned for a second runway.

Jones remained close with Jowell, and in 2018 led a debate in the House of Commons paying tribute to Jowell's fight against brain cancer and her campaign for improved cancer treatment. Jones continued to campaign in the wake of Jowell's death, prompting the government to launch the Tessa Jowell Brain Cancer Mission (TJBCM). Upon its launch, Jones was appointed to the Joint Strategy Board of the TJBCM.

== Parliamentary career ==
Jones was selected to contest the marginal Croydon Central constituency at the 2015 general election. Despite achieving a 5.9% swing to Labour, Jones narrowly lost by 165 votes to the incumbent Conservative MP Gavin Barwell.

At the 2017 general election, she defeated Barwell with a majority of 5,652 votes. Jones's victory made further headlines due to Barwell publishing a book titled How to Win a Marginal Seat after his 2015 victory.

Jones made her maiden speech in the House of Commons during a debate on the Grenfell Tower fire. Jones criticised politicians' failure to listen to Grenfell victims before the disaster, and called on the Government to retrofit sprinklers in all council tower blocks. The speech received widespread coverage for being the first time Croydon rapper Stormzy was quoted in Parliament, with Jones warning MPs: "You're never too big for the boot."

After highlighting the rise in knife crime in Croydon during the general election campaign, Jones ran a campaign in 2017 calling for a stronger Government response to knife crime across the UK. She launched the All-Party Parliamentary Group (APPG) on Knife Crime in September 2017, being elected as the group's Chair. At its launch over 30 MPs and Peers joined the group, which is supported by charities Redthread and Barnardo's. The APPG's stated aims are to 'look in detail at the root causes of knife crime – with particular focus on prevention and early intervention'. Whilst Jones chaired the APPG on Knife Crime, she published a report on the role of youth services in tackling knife crime.

Under Jones' chairmanship, the APPG also published a report on the link between school exclusions and knife crime, which found that children who have been excluded from school may be at serious risk of involvement in knife crime and youth violence.

Jones was appointed as Parliamentary Private Secretary to John Healey, Labour's Shadow Housing Secretary in January 2018, and was subsequently promoted to Shadow Housing Minister in 2018, succeeding Tony Lloyd. From the Labour frontbench, Jones has called on the Government to implement fire safety reform and secure protections for leaseholders. Together with John Healey, she published 'Ending the Scandal: Labour's New Deal for Leaseholders' in July 2019. She was re-elected in the December 2019 election, again for Croydon.

She backed Keir Starmer in the 2020 Labour Party leadership election. In April 2020, Leader of the Opposition Sir Keir Starmer appointed Jones as Shadow Minister for Police and the Fire Service.

Jones led the Fire Safety Act 2021 through Parliament and tabled amendments to prevent fire safety remediation costs being passed on to leaseholders. The Government agreed to Jones' amendments to implement the Grenfell Inquiry Phase 1 Recommendations by October 2021.

As Labour's Shadow Minister of State for Policing and the Fire Service, Jones led Labour's response to the Police, Crime, Sentencing and Courts Bill in Parliament. Jones tabled various measures to improve the Bill, including amendments to better protect the rights of victims, prevent violence against women and girls and tackle child criminal exploitation across the county.

She led a campaign in Parliament to protect retail workers through a change in the law that would create a standalone offence and a 12-month prison sentence for abuse, threats, and violence against retail workers.

In the 2023 British shadow cabinet reshuffle, she was given the new role of Shadow Minister for Industry and Decarbonisation.

Appointed as Minister of State for Industry in July 2024, Jones worked on a deal reached by the Government to secure the future of the workforce at all four of Harland and Wolff's UK shipyards.

Jones worked on the Government's decision to end the mineworkers pension injustice. Speaking after the announcement, Jones said: ‘Miners powered our industries and our homes for decades. That's why we have to right the wrong that has denied them the decent pension they deserved. We are handing over the £1.5 billion that for years has sat in the reserve fund unused at times when people needed it most. This will end an historic injustice and will ensure members of the scheme see an average increase of £29 per week added to their pay – an increase of 32%."

Jones played a key role in the Government’s work to secure the future of British Steel, which included taking the unprecedented step to recall Parliament.Speaking in the Chamber during the debate on the Steel Industry (Special Measures) Bill, Jones said: "In the first 10 weeks after coming to power, this Government negotiated a better deal on Port Talbot and delivered a £200 million commitment to secure the future of Grangemouth. We acted last week on the zero emission vehicle mandate to secure our automotive industry. We are acting today to save the workers of Scunthorpe. The Government believe in direct action—in an active state securing the future of our industry across the UK." The Act passed by Parliament provided the Government with the power to direct British Steel to ensure continued operation of the blast furnaces in Scunthorpe and secure raw materials supply. As a result, British Steel cancelled the redundancy consultations, protecting 2,700 jobs in Scunthorpe and 37,000 jobs in the supply chain.

As Minister of State for Industry, Jones was also construction minister. She was criticised for only attending three Construction Leadership Council board meetings in almost a year despite being a co-chair of the body.

Jones was appointed Minister of State for Policing and Crime in a reshuffle on 6 September 2025.

In July 2026, she was reappointed to the new government as Minister of State at the Home Office by Andy Burnham.

== Views ==
On rising rates of knife crime, Jones said in 2018:

While parliamentary farce and stalemate continues, the reality for our country is regression. The most visceral symptom is the continuing epidemic of knife violence. Across the country children are arming themselves and dying on our streets. What bigger symbol could there be of a generation abandoned and all aspiration lost?

Jones lists Mo Mowlam as a political hero, and in March 2023 spoke at the opening of the Mo Mowlam Cinematic Arts Studio at Ulster University. In her speech, she spoke of Mowlam's resolute commitment to peace in Northern Ireland. Mowlam's starting point, according to Jones, was her 'total joy of humanity...a pragmatism to get things moving' and a commitment to working 'the common ground'.

Before her election, Jones commented on the makeup of the House of Commons. She said: "I think everybody accepts that in Parliament the imbalance is still there. There are not enough women, there are not enough BME backgrounds, there not enough people with disabilities...Parliament doesn't reflect the people that they are there to serve and I think if you have all those different perspectives in the room, you will have a better conversation and better quality results."

Jones believes in freedom of choice to have an abortion. During the passage of the Public Order Act, Jones gave vocal support from the Labour frontbench to amendments delivering so-called 'buffer zones' around abortion clinics. The amendments were later passed into law.

She is a member of the Fabian Society.

== Personal life ==
Jones is married and has four children.

Parliament of the United Kingdom
Preceded by Gavin Barwell	Member of Parliament for Croydon Central; 2017–2024	Constituency abolished
New constituency	Member of Parliament for Croydon East; 2024–present	Incumbent
