= Parliamentary Under-Secretary of State for Transport =

Junior transport minister in UK government

United Kingdom Parliamentary Under-Secretaries of State for Transport
- Royal Arms of His Majesty's Government

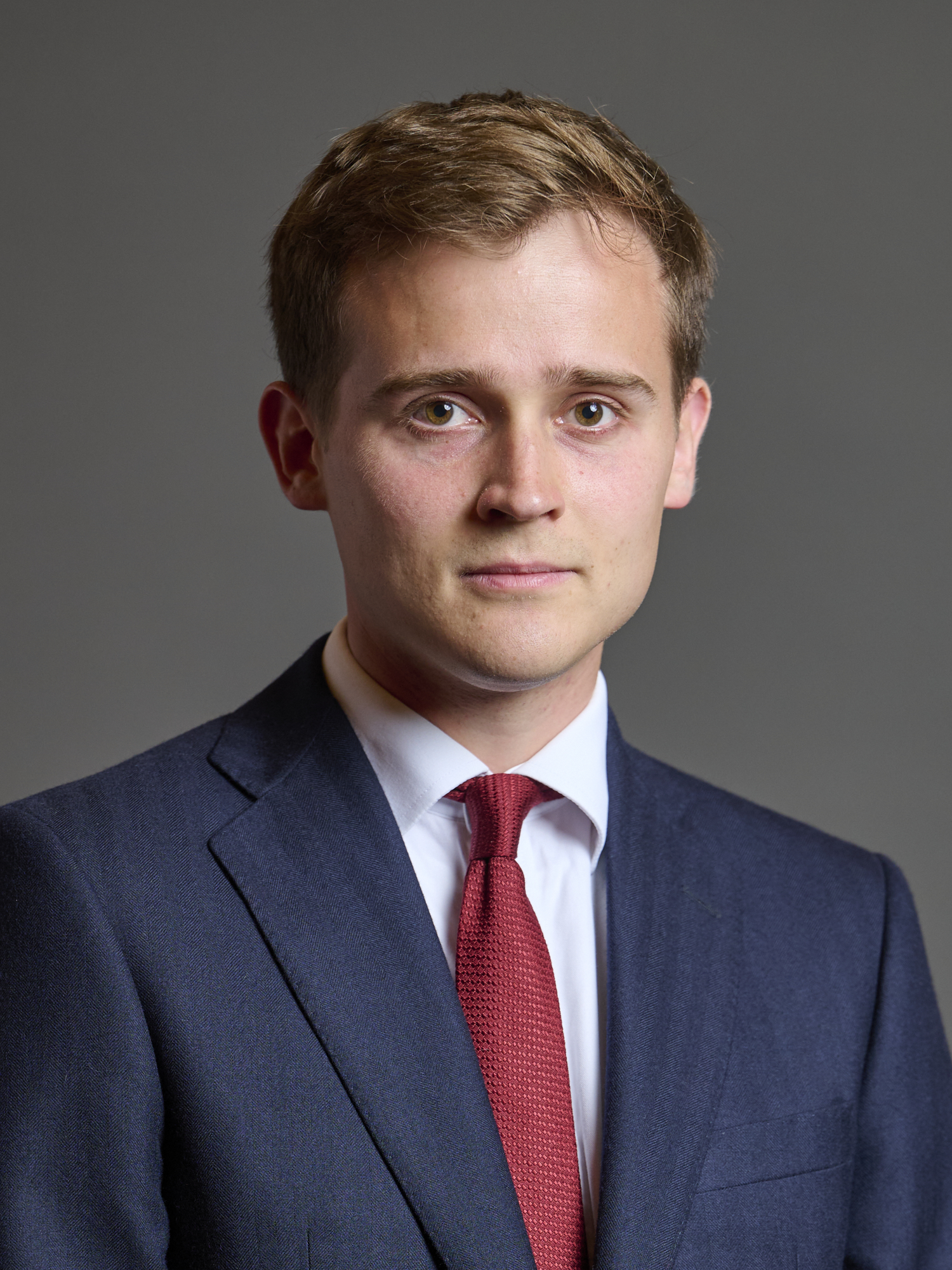
- Incumbent; Left to Right: Simon Lightwood; Keir Mather; Justin Madders; since July 2024, September 2025 and July 2026 respectively
- Department for Transport
- Style: Minister
- Reports to: Secretary of State for Transport
- Nominator: Prime Minister of the United Kingdom
- Appointer: The King; (on advice of the Prime Minister)
- Term length: At His Majesty's pleasure
- First holder: Tom Harris

Parliamentary Under-Secretaries of State for Transport are junior ministers in the Department for Transport of His Majesty's Government. They report to the Secretary of State for Transport and are responsible for various aspects of British transport policy.

== Current responsibilities ==
=== Parliamentary Under-Secretary of State (Minister for Roads) ===
Justin Madders as the Minister for Roads is responsible for:

- roads, including Road Investment Strategy (RIS)
- road safety
- automated vehicles
- micromobility
- motoring agencies
- vehicle standards
- Lower Thames Crossing
- AI and technology

=== Parliamentary Under-Secretary of State (Minister for Buses and Local Transport) ===
Simon Lightwood as the Minister for Buses and Local Transport is responsible for:

- devolution and regions
- buses and coaches
- taxis and PHVs
- local transport
- active travel
- accessibility
- VAWG
- integrated transport, ticketing and fares
- planning and housing
- electric vehicles, decarbonisation and environment

=== Parliamentary Under-Secretary of State (Minister for Aviation, Maritime and Logistics) ===
Keir Mather as the Minister for Aviation, Maritime and Logistics is responsible for:

- aviation
- Heathrow expansion
- maritime
- international
- security and resilience
- freight and borders
- sustainable aviation fuel (SAF)

== List of ministers ==
Name	Portrait	Term of office		Party	Prime Minister	Portfolio
John Horam		10 September 1976	4 May 1979	Labour	Wilson; Callaghan	
Kenneth Clarke		7 May 1979	5 March 1982	Conservative	Thatcher I	
Reginald Eyre		5 March 1982	11 June 1983	Conservative	Thatcher I	
Lynda Chalker		5 March 1982	18 October 1983	Conservative	Thatcher I	
Lynda Chalker		5 March 1982	18 October 1983	Conservative	Thatcher II	
David Mitchell		11 June 1983	23 January 1986	Conservative	Thatcher II	
Michael Spicer		11 September 1984	13 June 1987	Conservative	Thatcher II	
Malcolm Sinclair, 20th Earl of Caithness		2 September 1985	10 September 1986	Conservative	Thatcher II	
Peter Bottomley		23 January 1986	24 July 1989	Conservative	Thatcher II & III	
Ivon Moore-Brabazon		10 September 1986	23 July 1989	Conservative	Thatcher II & III	
Robert Atkins		25 July 1989	22 July 1990	Conservative	Thatcher III	
Patrick McLoughlin		25 July 1989	14 April 1992	Conservative	Thatcher III; Major I	
Christopher Chope		23 July 1990	14 April 1992	Conservative	Thatcher III; Major I	
Kenneth Carlisle		14 April 1992	27 May 1993	Conservative	Major II	
Steven Norris		14 April 1992	23 July 1996	Conservative	Major II	
Robert Key		27 May 1993	20 July 1994	Conservative	Major II	
John MacKay, Baron MacKay of Ardbrecknish		11 January 1994	20 July 1994	Conservative	Major II	
Giles Goschen		20 July 1994	2 May 1997	Conservative	Major II	
John Bowis		23 July 1994	2 May 1997	Conservative	Major II	
Helene Hayman, Baroness Hayman		6 May 1997	28 July 1998	Labour	Blair I	
Glenda Jackson		6 May 1997	29 July 1999	Labour	Blair I	
Larry Whitty, Baron Whitty		28 July 1998	11 June 2001	Labour	Blair I	
Keith Hill		29 July 1999	8 June 2001	Labour	Blair I	
Sally Keeble		7 June 2001	29 May 2002	Labour	Blair II	
David Jamieson		11 June 2001	10 May 2005	Labour	Blair II	Roads; Road Safety; Cleaner Vehicles and Fuels; Licensing, roadworthiness and insurance; Haulage, Logistics and Maritime; Highways Agency; DVO Group Agencies
Tony McNulty		29 May 2002	10 September 2004	Labour	Blair II	Aviation; London (including Tube and Crossrail); Regional and sub-regional issues (e.g. Thames Gateway, Multi Modals); Local Authority public transport; Buses and Taxis; Mobility and Inclusion issues; Corporate Issues; Green Minister; Ministerial Design Champion
Charlotte Atkins		10 September 2004	10 May 2005	Labour	Blair II	Aviation; Regional and sub-regional issues; Local authority public transport; Buses and taxis; Mobility and inclusion issues; Corporate issues; Green Minister; Pedestrian and cycling issues; Transport technology (including Transport Direct); Better regulation
Derek Twigg		5 May 2005	6 September 2006	Labour	Blair III	Rail; Crossrail Bill; Light rail; British Transport Police; Rail Passengers Committee; Walking and Cycling
Karen Buck		10 May 2005	16 March 2006	Labour	Blair III	Aviation; London; Local transport, including Local Authority roads and Local Transport Plans; Regional and sub-regional issues; Traffic Management; Buses and taxis; Mobility and inclusion; Climate Change; Corporate Issues; Green Minister
Gillian Merron		8 May 2006	27 June 2007	Labour	Blair III	Aviation; London; Mobility and inclusion; Corporate issues; Local, regional and sub-regional transport; Traffic management; Buses and taxis; Climate change and green issues
Tom Harris		7 September 2006	4 October 2008	Labour	Blair III	Rail; Crossrail Bill; Light rail; British Transport Police; Rail Passengers Committee; Walking and Cycling
Jim Fitzpatrick		28 June 2007	8 June 2009	Labour	Brown	Aviation; Environment; Shipping; Road Safety
Paul Clark		5 October 2008	11 May 2010	Labour	Brown	City and regional networks: Local Authority Transport; Buses; Cycling; Light rail; Walking; Accessibility; TWA orders
Chris Mole		5 June 2009	11 May 2010	Labour	Brown	National Networks; Corporate
Norman Baker		15 May 2010	7 October 2013	Liberal Democrats	Cameron–Clegg	Rail (including commercial, operational performance and Community Rail); Buses – including concessionary fares; Taxis; Light rail and trams; Smart ticketing (including rail fares and ticketing); Traffic management; Regional and Local transport (including local roads, maintenance, Major Projects, winter resilience); Natural environment – including biofuels; Sustainable travel – including walking and cycling; Accessibility and equalities; Alternatives to travel; SMEs and growth
Mike Penning		12 May 2010	4 September 2012	Conservative	Cameron–Clegg	Strategic roads and Highways Agency; Motoring agencies; Road Safety and Standards; Freight and Logistics - including lorry road user charging; Maritime and Dangerous Goods - including Maritime and Coastguard Agency
Stephen Hammond		4 September 2012	15 July 2014	Conservative	Cameron–Clegg	Strategic Roads and Highways Agency; Motoring Agencies; Road Safety and Standards; Freight and Logistics – including lorry road user charging; Maritime and Dangerous Goods (including Maritime and Coastguard Agency); London; Crossrail; Better regulation
Robert Goodwill		7 October 2013	9 December 2015	Conservative	Cameron–Clegg	Aviation; Strategic Roads and Highways Agency; Motoring agencies; Road Safety and Standards; Freight and Logistics – including lorry road user charging; Local Roads; Cycling; HS2 Phase One; Europe
Claire Perry		15 July 2014	14 July 2016	Conservative	Cameron II	Rail franchising; Rail commercial; Rail fares; Rail major projects (including Crossrail); Freight and Logistics; Transport agencies; Corporate and better regulation
Andrew Jones		11 May 2015	15 June 2017	Conservative	Cameron II; May I	Northern Powerhouse, including Northern and TransPennine Express franchises; Environment; Office for Low Emission Vehicles (OLEV); Connected vehicles; Technology and Innovation; Freight and Logistics; National roads and Highways England; Bus policy; Local transport, including roads, local majors, and Local Sustainable Transport Fund; City growth deals; Smart ticketing; Road safety
Tariq Ahmad, Baron Ahmad of Wimbledon		11 May 2015	11 June 2017	Conservative	Cameron II; May I	Aviation security; Transport agencies; Corporate and better regulation; Skills and supply chain; London
Paul Maynard		16 July 2016	9 January 2018	Conservative	May I & II	Rail (including housing development); Rail security; Light rail
Martin Callanan, Baron Callanan		14 June 2017	27 October 2017	Conservative	May II	Aviation; Corporate issues for the Department; International transport; Transport legislation in the Lords; Transport security
Jesse Norman		15 June 2017	12 November 2018	Conservative	May II	Buses; Cycling and Walking policy; Highways England and strategic roads; Light rail; Local roads policy and funding; Motoring agencies; Road freight; Road safety; Transport and the environment; Transport technology (including digital)
Liz Sugg, Baroness Sugg		27 October 2017	23 April 2019	Conservative	May II	Aviation; Transport security; International; EU and EU exit; Legislation in the Lords; Corporate; Civil contingencies
Andrew Jones		12 November 2018	26 July 2019	Conservative	May II	Rail; Northern Powerhouse rail; Crossrail 2; Rail industrial relations; Rail security
Nus Ghani		9 January 2018	13 February 2020	Conservative	May II; Johnson I & II	Accessibility across all transport modes; Buses and taxis; Community transport; High speed rail (HS2); Maritime; Maritime and Coastguard Agency (MCA); Maritime security; Skills and Apprenticeships; the Year of Engineering; Loneliness
Charlotte Vere, Baroness Vere of Norbiton		23 April 2019	14 November 2023	Conservative	May II; Johnson I & II; Truss; Sunak	Roads; Security; Freight (excluding Brexit and rail); Drones; Taxis and Buses; Light rail; Community transport; All Lords business (until October 2022) All Lords’ business; Aviation; Space; International; Local transport (including City Region Sustainable Transport Settlements, buses and taxis, light rail); Active travel; Corporate; SME minister; Deputy for security; Deputy for civil contingencies (from October 2022)
Paul Maynard		26 July 2019	13 February 2020	Conservative	Johnson I	Aviation (including Heathrow expansion); Northern Powerhouse Rail; HS2; TransPennine route upgrade; Crossrail; East West Rail
Kelly Tolhurst		13 February 2020	8 September 2020	Conservative	Johnson II	Aviation; Maritime; Security and civil contingencies; Commons shadow roads
Rachel Maclean		13 February 2020	16 September 2021	Conservative	Johnson II	EU transition and future relationship; Future of transport; Transport decarbonisation and Environment; Secondary legislation
Robert Courts		8 September 2020	20 September 2022	Conservative	Johnson II	Aviation; Maritime; Security and civil contingencies
Trudy Harrison		16 September 2021	7 July 2022	Conservative	Johnson II	Decarbonisation of Transport (including the Office for Zero Emission Vehicles); Environment (including the Joint Air Quality Unit); Future of Transport (including the Centre for Connected and Autonomous Vehicles); Women’s safety on the transport network; Future of freight strategy; Commercial spaceflight; EU and international transport; Transport research and science; Secondary legislation
Wendy Morton		19 December 2021	9 February 2022	Conservative	Johnson II	Rail and Accessibility
Karl McCartney		8 July 2022	8 September 2022	Conservative	Johnson II	Unknown
Katherine Fletcher		20 September 2022	27 October 2022	Conservative	Truss	Roads and motoring (including DVLA and DVSA); Smart Motorways; Regions (including London, sub-national transport bodies and TfN); Union connectivity; Project Speed; Major projects; Women’s safety; Poverty and cost of living; Levelling up
Richard Holden (Roads and Local Transport)		28 October 2022	13 November 2023	Conservative	Sunak	Roads and motoring (including DVLA, DVSA, VCA); Regions and devolution; Local transport (including buses, taxis, light rail; union connectivity; haulage); Future of Freight; London (including Crossrail, Transport for London); Accessibility (cross-cutting responsibility)
Anthony Browne (Decarbonisation and Technology)		13 November 2023	5 July 2024	Conservative	Sunak	aviation; transport decarbonisation; air quality; technology, (including autonomous vehicles, drones, e-scooters); space; skills, science and research; corporate (including public appointments); aviation accessibility
Guy Opperman (Roads and Local Transport)		13 November 2023	5 July 2024	Conservative	Sunak	Roads maintenance and infrastructure delivery (including National Highways); Road safety; Motoring agencies (DVLA, DVSA, VCA); Local transport including buses, taxis, light rail; active travel (cycling and walking); Kent including BROCK, TAP; EES and borders; Haulage; Future of Freight; Women’s safety; Accessibility (cross-cutting lead as Ministerial Disability Champion)
Byron Davies, Baron Davies of Gower (Maritime and Security)		14 November 2023	5 July 2024	Conservative	Sunak	Primary legislation in the Lords; Maritime; Security (including Ukraine); Civil contingencies; International; Union connectivity; Secondary legislation (including retained EU law); Maritime accessibility
Simon Lightwood (Local Transport until September 2025; Roads and Buses September 2025 to July 2026; Local Transport and Sustainability from July 2026)		9 July 2024	Incumbent	Labour Co-op	Starmer; Burnham	Local transport (buses, taxis, private hire vehicles, light rail); Local transport decarbonisation; Local transport accessibility, and cross-cutting transport accessibility; Tackling violence against women and girls on the transport network; Active travel; E-scooters; Modal shift; regions and devolution; The department’s relationship with London, including Transport for London; Transport connectivity across the union; Integrated transport strategy (Until September 2025) Roads; Buses; Accessibility; Automated vehicles (AVs); Motoring agencies; Micromobility (October 2025 to July 2026) Accessibility; Active travel; Buses and coaches; Devolution and regions; Electric vehicles, decarbonisation and environment; Integrated transport, Ticketing and fares; Local transport; Planning and housing; Taxis and PHVs; VAWG (from July 2026)
Lilian Greenwood (Future of Roads)		9 July 2024	7 September 2025	Labour	Starmer	Strategic roads (including: National Highways, Road Investment Strategy (RIS), Infrastructure planning and delivery); Road safety; Local roads and roads maintenance; Motoring agencies (DVLA, DVSA, VCA); Haulage and future of freight; Kent traffic; EES and borders; Road vehicle decarbonisation; Environment strategy; Automated vehicles; International vehicle standards; Traffic and technology; Roads accessibility
Mike Kane (Aviation, Maritime and Security)		9 July 2024	6 September 2025	Labour	Starmer	Aviation; Aviation decarbonisation, including Sustainable Aviation Fuel (SAF); Maritime; Maritime decarbonisation and autonomy; Maritime and aviation accessibility; the Maritime and Coastguard Agency (MCA); the Civil Aviation Authority (CAA); Security; Civil contingencies; Iinternational transport policy
Keir Mather (Aviation, Maritime and Logistics)		8 September 2025	Incumbent	Labour	Starmer; Burnham	Aviation and airport expansion; Maritime; Decarbonisation and electric vehicles (EVs); Freight and borders; Security
Lilian Greenwood (Local Transport)		16 September 2025	22 July 2026	Labour	Starmer	Local transport; Active travel; Violence against women and girls (VAWG); Taxis and private hire vehicles (PHVs); Road safety
Justin Madders (Roads)		22 July 2026	Incumbent	Labour	Burnham	Vehicle standards; Roads, including Road Investment Strategy (RIS); Road safety; Motoring agencies; Micromobility; Lower Thames Crossing; Automated vehicles; AI and technology
