= Blair McDougall =

British politician

Blair McDougall MP
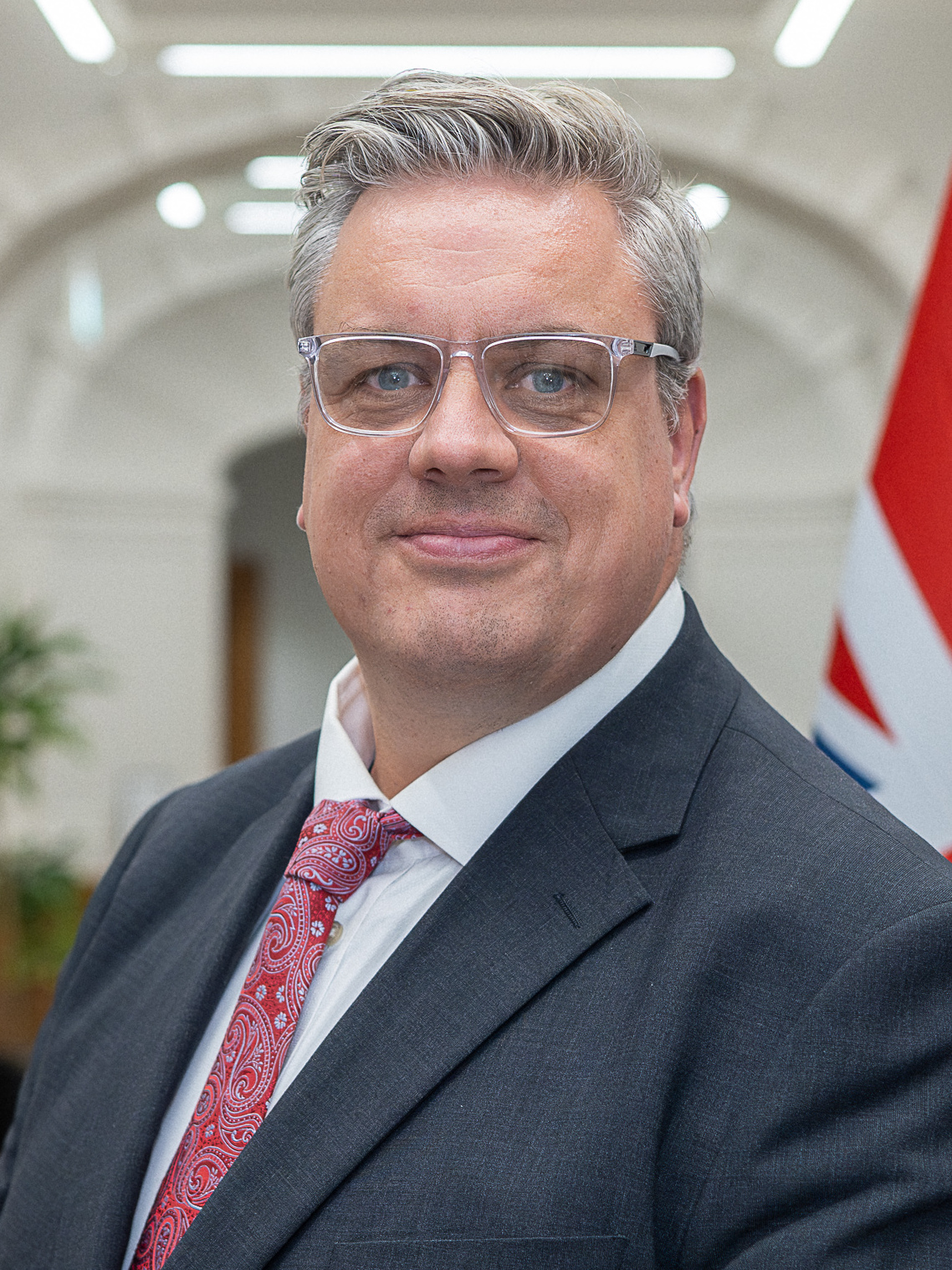
- Official portrait, 2025

Parliamentary Under-Secretary of State for Reindustrialisation
- Incumbent
- Assumed office 22 July 2026
- Prime Minister: Andy Burnham
- Preceded by: Chris McDonald

Parliamentary Under-Secretary of State for Small Business and Economic Transformation
- In office 7 September 2025 – 22 July 2026
- Prime Minister: Keir Starmer
- Preceded by: Gareth Thomas
- Succeeded by: Sonny Leong, Baron Leong

Member of Parliament for East Renfrewshire
- Incumbent
- Assumed office 4 July 2024
- Preceded by: Kirsten Oswald
- Majority: 8,421 (16.8%)

Personal details
- Born: 3 June 1978 (age 48) Scotland
- Party: Labour
- Education: University of Glasgow

Blair McDougall (born 3 June 1978) is a Scottish politician and former political adviser who has served as the Member of Parliament for East Renfrewshire since 2024. A member of the Scottish Labour Party, he has served as Parliamentary Under-Secretary of State for Reindustrialisation since July 2026 and previously served as Parliamentary Under-Secretary of State for Small Business and Economic Transformation from 2025 to 2026. He was the head strategist for the Better Together campaign during the 2014 Scottish independence referendum.

== Career ==
He was educated at the University of Glasgow, where as chair of the Labour Club he was Ross Kemp's campaign manager during the 1999 Rectorial election.

He went on to serve as chair of Scottish Labour Students from 2001 to 2003 before becoming a special adviser to Ian McCartney, Minister for Trade, Foreign and Commonwealth Office and James Purnell, Secretary of State for Culture, Media & Sport in the governments of Tony Blair and Gordon Brown.

In 2006 he took the post of Youth Representative on Labour's National Executive Committee.

Between September 2009 and July 2010, as part of an initiative led by Tony Blair, McDougall worked for Rwandan president Paul Kagame as an "adviser on governance and strategic communications".

Following Labour's defeat at the 2010 general election, McDougall coordinated parliamentary engagement for David Miliband's unsuccessful campaign for the party leadership. He became Campaign Director of Better Together in 2012. After the No vote in the referendum on 18 September 2014, McDougall explained a key element of success had been regular and rigorous voter research and message testing.

In 2014, he was appointed to an advisory role in Jim Murphy's successful campaign for the Scottish Labour leadership. Murphy subsequently lost his seat to the SNP in the 2015 general election.

In April 2017, McDougall was confirmed as the Scottish Labour candidate for Murphy's former constituency of East Renfrewshire in the 2017 general election. He came third in that election, with 26.7% of the vote, a fall in the Labour vote of over 7 points as compared with the 2015 election, in which Murphy came second with 34% of the vote.

In January 2020, Labour MP Jess Phillips hired McDougall as Scotland adviser for her unsuccessful leadership campaign.

McDougall announced in July 2023 that he was running to be the Labour candidate for East Renfrewshire at the 2024 United Kingdom general election. He was elected as MP for East Renfrewshire after beating incumbent Kirsten Oswald.

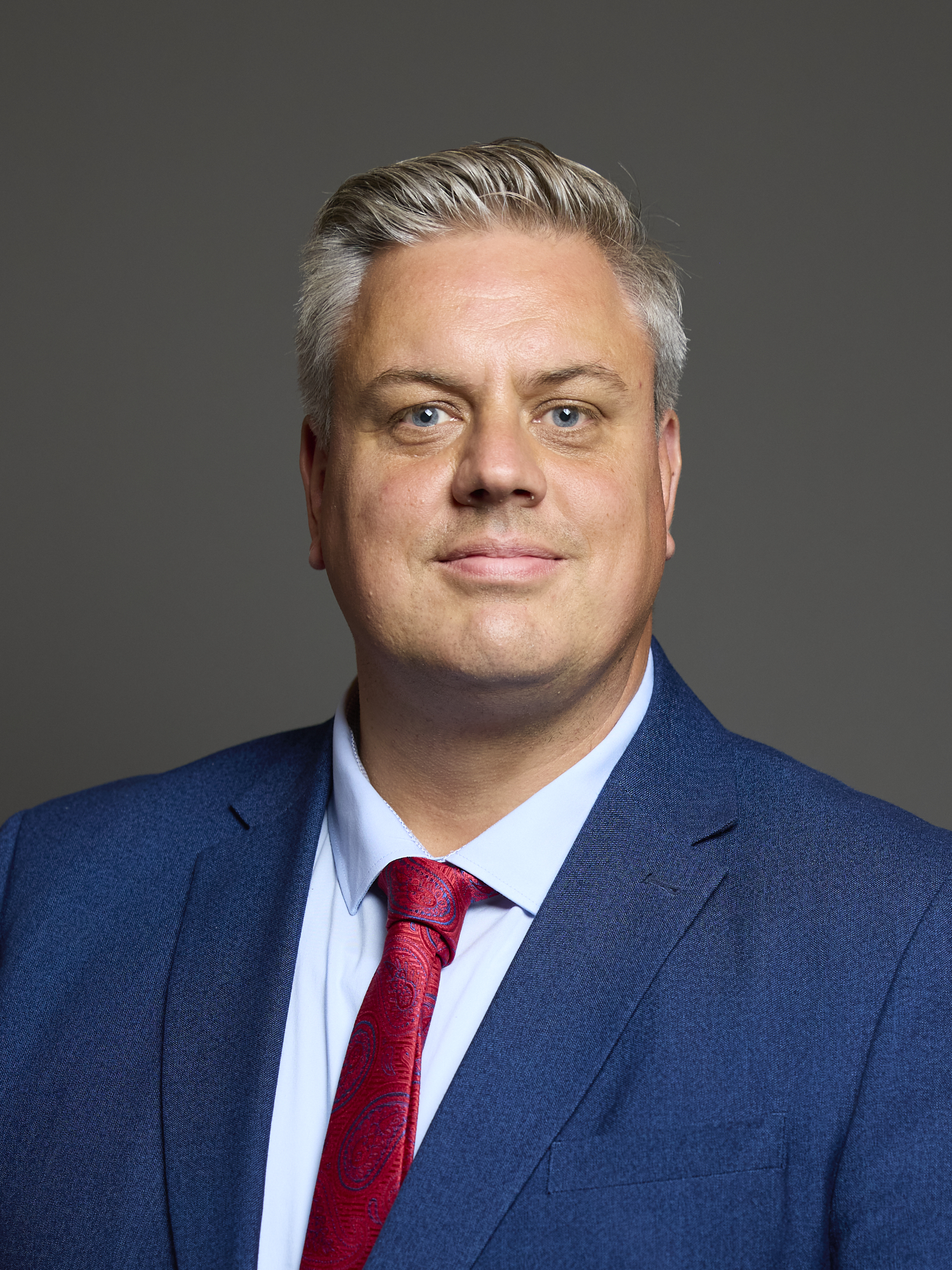
2024 MP portrait of Blair McDougall

In 2024 until he became an MP, McDougall was a senior strategist at political lobbying firm Arden Strategies. According to his register of members interests, McDougall worked "as a consultant delivering international governance aid programmes for democratic activists in Belarus, Kosovo and Serbia", on behalf of the National Democratic Institute from February to April 2024. He also worked as a consultant for the East West Management Institute, based in Georgia, USA.

McDougall is the chair of the Stop Uyghur Genocide Charity.

== Personal life ==
McDougall is married to Mary and has two children.

Party political offices
Preceded by Claire McCarthy	Young Labour representative on the National Executive Committee of the Labour Party; 2001 – 2003	Succeeded by Jonathan Reynolds
