= Sussex Weald (constituency) =

UK Parliament constituency (since 2024)

Coordinates: 50.99°N 0.24°E

- County constituency for the House of Commons
- Boundaries since 2024
- Boundary of Sussex Weald in South East England
- County: Sussex
- Electorate: 70,075 (2023)
- Major settlements: Heathfield; Crowborough; Hailsham

Current constituency
- Created: 2024
- Member of Parliament: Nusrat Ghani (Conservative)
- Seats: One
- Created from: Wealden; Bexhill and Battle

Sussex Weald (Sus-ix /ˈwiːld/) is a constituency of the House of Commons in the UK Parliament. Further to the completion of the 2023 Periodic Review of Westminster constituencies, it was first contested at the 2024 general election. It is currently represented by Nus Ghani of the Conservative Party; she was previously MP for the predecessor seat of Wealden from 2015 to 2024 and currently serves as Chairman of Ways and Means, the senior Deputy Speaker of the House of Commons.

The constituency name refers to the Weald region of Sussex.

== Constituency profile ==
High Street, Crowborough

Sussex Weald is a constituency in East Sussex in South East England, within the Wealden district. Its largest towns are Crowborough and Hailsham, which each have populations of around 23,000. Other settlements include the towns of Heathfield and Wadhurst and the villages of Hellingly and Mayfield. The constituency is named after the Weald, a geographical area of rolling hills that was traditionally forested.

This is a large, rural constituency with many small towns and villages, covering the area between Eastbourne and Royal Tunbridge Wells. Hailsham is a historic market town with a tradition of rope-making and Crowborough has had more recent growth in the late 19th century as a health resort. There is some deprivation in Hailsham whilst the rest of the constituency is mostly affluent. House prices across the constituency are generally higher than the regional and UK averages.

Sussex Weald has a large retired population and low proportions of young and middle-aged adults. Residents have high levels of income and homeownership, and the child poverty rate is low. They have average levels of education and a high proportion work in the agriculture, retail and construction sectors. The percentage of residents claiming unemployment benefits is low. White people made up 96% of the population at the 2021 census.

At the local district council, Crowborough and Hailsham are mostly represented by Liberal Democrats, Heathfield by independents and the rural villages by Conservative and Green Party councillors. At the county council, which held elections more recently (in 2026), most of the constituency elected Reform UK representatives. An estimated 54% of voters in Sussex Weald supported leaving the European Union in the 2016 referendum, marginally higher than the UK-wide figure of 52%.

== Boundaries ==
The constituency is composed of the following (as they existed on 1 December 2020):

- The District of Wealden wards of: Chiddingly, East Hoathly & Waldron; Crowborough Central; Crowborough Jarvis Brook; Crowborough North; Crowborough St. Johns; Crowborough South East; Crowborough South West; Framfield & Cross-in-Hand; Frant & Wadhurst; Hadlow Down & Rotherfield; Hailsham Central; Hailsham East; Hailsham North; Hailsham North West; Hailsham South; Hailsham West; Hartfield; Heathfield North; Heathfield South; Hellingly; Horam & Punnetts Town; Mayfield & Five Ashes; Withyham.

It comprises the following areas of East Sussex:

- Approximately 70% of the former Wealden seat, including the towns of Crowborough and Hailsham
- The town of Heathfield and surrounding villages from the Bexhill and Battle constituency

== Members of Parliament ==
Wealden prior to 2024

Election	Member	Party
2024	Nusrat Ghani	Conservative

== Elections ==
=== Elections in the 2020s ===
General election 2024: Sussex Weald
Party	Candidate	Votes	%	±%
Conservative	Nusrat Ghani	16,758	34.1	−29.6
Liberal Democrats	Danielle Newson	9,916	20.2	+3.4
Reform	David Morgan	8,920	18.1	N/A
Labour	Dipesh Patel	8,239	16.8	+1.9
Green	Austin Henderson	3,762	7.7	+3.1
Independent	Shaun Bowler	953	1.9	N/A
SDP	Stephen Gander	319	0.6	N/A
Heritage	Dominie Stemp	156	0.3	N/A
UKIP	Chris Magness	152	0.3	N/A
Majority		6,842	13.9	−33.0
Turnout		49,175	67.5	−3.0
Registered electors		72,897		
Conservative hold		Swing	−16.5	

=== Elections in the 2010s ===
2019 notional result
Party	Vote	%
Conservative	31,486	63.7
Liberal Democrats	8,322	16.8
Labour	7,349	14.9
Green	2,261	4.6
Turnout	49,418	70.5
Electorate	70,075	

== See also ==
- List of parliamentary constituencies in East Sussex
- List of parliamentary constituencies in the South East England (region)
