= Minister of State for Policing and Crime =

UK government position

United Kingdom Minister of State for Policing and Crime
- Royal Arms of His Majesty's Government

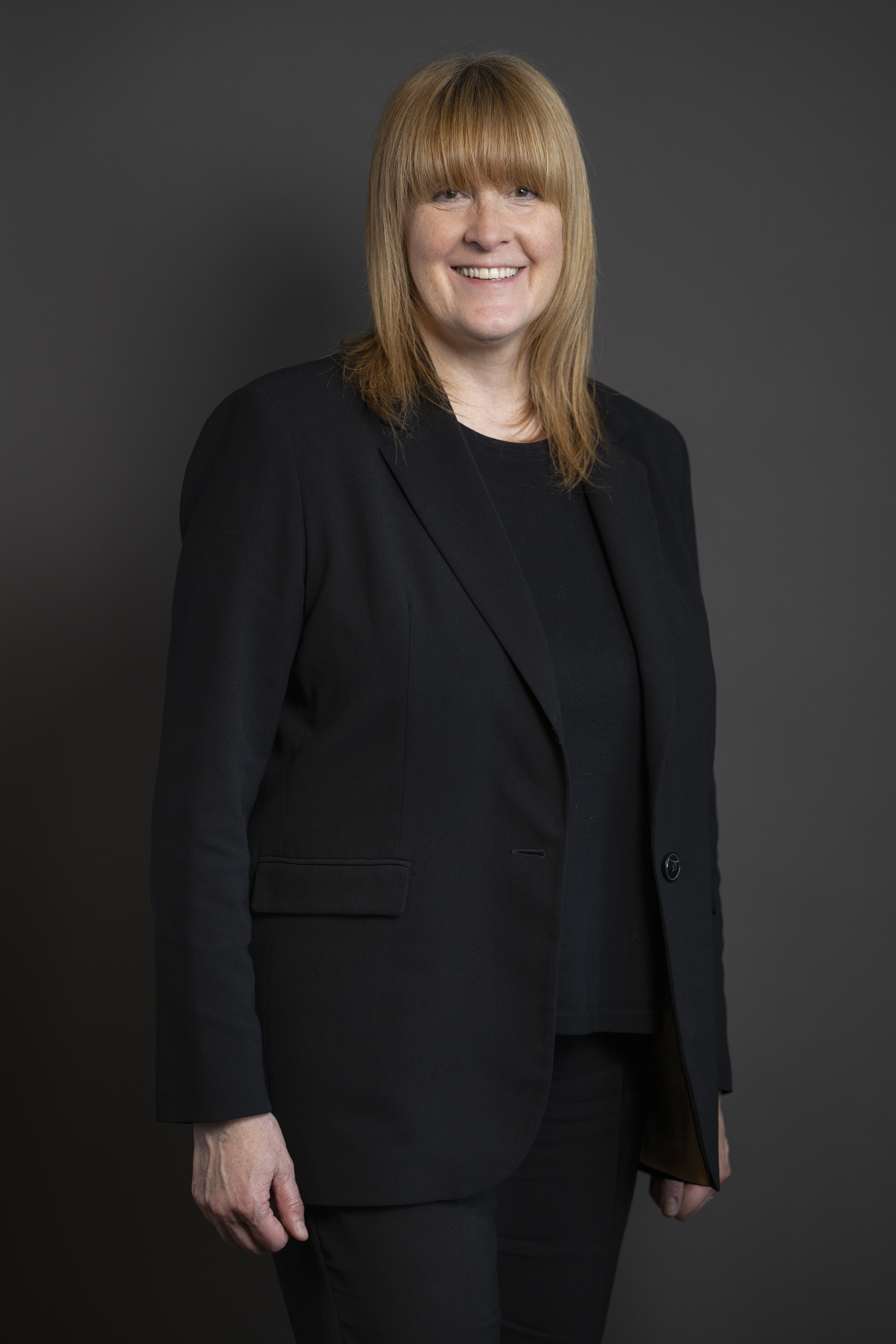
- Incumbent; Sarah Jones since 6 September 2025
- Home Office
- Appointer: The British Monarch on advice of the Prime Minister
- Website: https://www.gov.uk/government/ministers/minister-of-state--204

The Minister of State for Policing and Crime is a ministerial position held at the Home Office in the Government of the United Kingdom. Holders of this office have previously held additional responsibilities such as for security, counter-terrorism and the fire service. The post had responsibility for the fire service from January 2016 to July 2019, from August 2019 to February 2020, and from September 2022 to April 2025.

This role was created by the splitting of the now-defunct office of the Minister for Security, Counter-Terrorism, Crime and Policing into two new ministerial posts: Security & Counter-Terrorism and Crime & Policing.

The current holder, following the 2025 British cabinet reshuffle, is Sarah Jones of the Labour Party.

== Responsibilities ==
The minister’s responsibilities are:

- Policing standards and governance
- Neighbourhood policing
- Public order, major events, and civil contingencies
- Criminal justice system
- Young Futures
- Safer Streets

== Ministers ==
Name	Portrait	Term of office		Political party	P.M.	Home Sec.
Minister of State for Policing
John Denham		11 June 2001	13 June 2003	Labour	Tony Blair	David Blunkett
Minister of State for Policing, Security and Community Safety
Hazel Blears		13 June 2003	5 May 2006	Labour	Tony Blair	David Blunkett; Charles Clarke
Minister of State for Security, Counter-Terrorism, Crime and Policing
Tony McNulty		5 May 2006	3 October 2008	Labour	Tony Blair; Gordon Brown	John Reid; Jacqui Smith
Minister of State for Policing, Crime and Security
Vernon Coaker		3 October 2008	3 June 2009	Labour	Gordon Brown	Jacqui Smith
Minister of State for Security, Counter-Terrorism, Crime and Policing
David Hanson		10 June 2009	11 May 2010	Labour	Gordon Brown	Alan Johnson
Minister of State for Policing and Criminal Justice
Nick Herbert		13 May 2010	4 September 2012	Conservative	David Cameron	Theresa May
Damian Green		4 September 2012	15 July 2014	Conservative	David Cameron	Theresa May
Minister of State for Policing and Justice
Mike Penning		15 July 2014	16 July 2016	Conservative	David Cameron	Theresa May
Minister of State for Policing and the Fire Service
Brandon Lewis		16 July 2016	12 June 2017	Conservative	Theresa May	Amber Rudd
Nick Hurd		12 June 2017	25 July 2019	Conservative	Theresa May	Amber Rudd
Nick Hurd		12 June 2017	25 July 2019	Conservative	Theresa May	Sajid Javid
Minister of State for Crime, Policing and the Fire Service
Kit Malthouse		25 July 2019	13 February 2020	Conservative	Boris Johnson	Priti Patel
Minister of State for Crime and Policing
Kit Malthouse		13 February 2020	7 July 2022	Conservative	Boris Johnson	Priti Patel
Tom Pursglove		7 July 2022	7 September 2022	Conservative	Boris Johnson	Priti Patel
Minister of State for Crime, Policing and Fire
Jeremy Quin		7 September 2022	25 October 2022	Conservative	Liz Truss	Suella Braverman; Grant Shapps
Chris Philp		26 October 2022	5 July 2024	Conservative	Rishi Sunak	Suella Braverman; James Cleverly
Minister of State for Policing, Fire and Crime Prevention (until April 2025) Minister of State for Policing and Crime Prevention (from April 2025)
Diana Johnson		8 July 2024	6 September 2025	Labour	Keir Starmer	Yvette Cooper
Minister of State for Policing and Crime
Sarah Jones		6 September 2025	Incumbent	Labour	Keir Starmer; Andy Burnham	Shabana Mahmood
