= Alan Mak (politician) =

British Conservative politician

Alan Mak MP FRSA
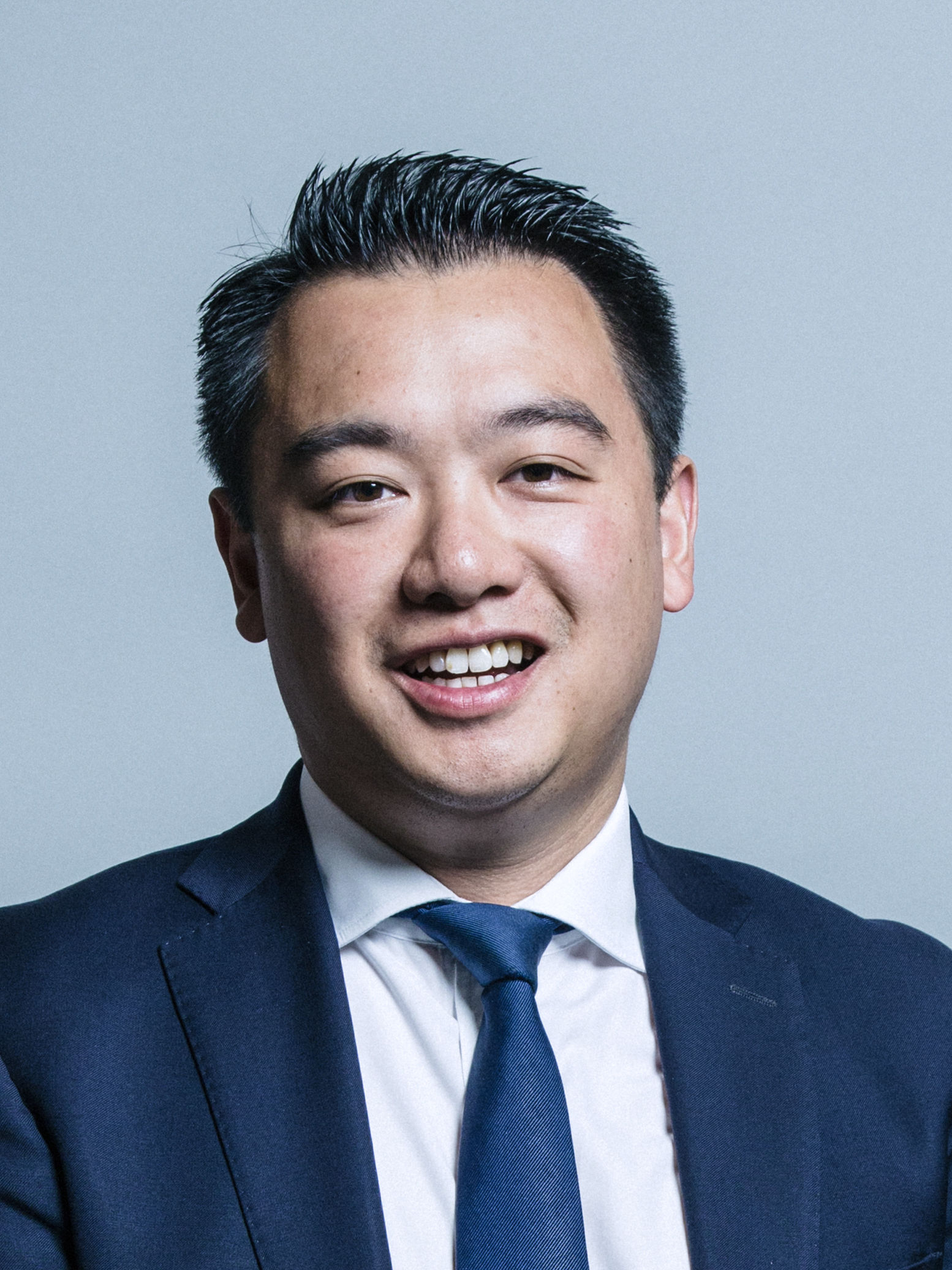
- Official portrait, 2017

Shadow Secretary of State for Science, Innovation and Technology
- In office 5 November 2024 – 22 July 2025
- Leader: Kemi Badenoch
- Preceded by: Andrew Griffith
- Succeeded by: Julia Lopez

Shadow Economic Secretary to the Treasury
- In office 19 July 2024 – 5 November 2024
- Leader: Rishi Sunak
- Preceded by: Tulip Siddiq
- Succeeded by: Mark Garnier

Parliamentary Under-Secretary of State for Industry and Economic Security
- In office 26 March 2024 – 5 July 2024
- Prime Minister: Rishi Sunak
- Preceded by: Nus Ghani
- Succeeded by: Sarah Jones (Note: As Minister of State for Industry.)

Parliamentary Under-Secretary of State for the Investment Security Unit
- In office 26 March 2024 – 5 July 2024
- Prime Minister: Rishi Sunak
- Preceded by: Nus Ghani
- Succeeded by: Office abolished

Exchequer Secretary to the Treasury
- In office 8 July 2022 – 7 September 2022
- Prime Minister: Boris Johnson
- Preceded by: Helen Whately
- Succeeded by: Felicity Buchan

Lord Commissioner of the Treasury
- In office 21 April 2021 – 8 July 2022
- Prime Minister: Boris Johnson

Member of Parliament for Havant
- Incumbent
- Assumed office 7 May 2015
- Preceded by: David Willetts
- Majority: 92 (0.2%)

Personal details
- Born: 19 November 1983 (age 42) York, North Yorkshire, England
- Party: Conservative
- Education: Peterhouse, Cambridge (BA)
- Website: Official website

Alan Mak (born 19 November 1983) is a British Conservative Party politician who has been the Member of Parliament (MP) for Havant since 2015. He recently served as the Shadow Secretary of State for Science, Innovation and Technology from November 2024 until July 2025 and as Parliamentary Under-Secretary of State for Industry and Economic Security and Parliamentary Under-Secretary of State for the Investment Security Unit from March to July 2024.

Mak was previously Exchequer Secretary to the Treasury from July to September 2022. He also served as a Lord Commissioner of the Treasury from April 2021 to July 2022.

== Early life and career ==
Alan Mak was born on 19 November 1983 in York to Chinese parents of Cantonese descent who were born in Guangdong and were settled in Hong Kong before moving to England, where they owned a Chinese food take-away. He attended Queen Anne Comprehensive School, York until the age of 13, before gaining an assisted place to attend the private St Peter's School, York. He read law at Peterhouse, Cambridge, where he won the ECS Wade Prize for Administrative Law. Mak then completed a post-graduate law and business diploma at the University of Oxford.

After graduation, Mak practised as a solicitor with Clifford Chance. He was named Graduate of the Year by Realworld in 2005. In 2010, he was recognised with the award for Young City Lawyer of the year in Square Mile magazine's 30 under 30 awards in 2010.

For over five years, Mak was trustee and later president of the child hunger and poverty charity Magic Breakfast. While he was serving as a Trustee, Magic Breakfast was awarded a Big Society Award in 2011 by Prime Minister David Cameron. In recognition of his work with the charity, he was selected to carry the Olympic Torch on 20 June 2012, in the town of Bedale as part of the 2012 Summer Olympics torch relay.

== Parliamentary career ==
=== 1st term (2015–2017) ===
Mak was elected to Parliament as MP for Havant at the 2015 general election with 51.7% of the vote and a majority of 13,920. He is the first East Asian to be elected to the House of Commons. However, he is uncomfortable with being defined solely by his ethnic identity and has dismissed the notion that his election as MP would raise the profile of British East Asians. In an interview with the South China Morning Post, he said "If the CFC and Chinese for Labour think I am going to be representing every Chinese, Thai, Vietnamese and Korean—and there are many in my constituency—they are mistaken. It's a stupid story. I am not standing for the Chinese population of Britain. I am standing for the people of Havant and my country". Following his election he expressed concern about the attention his ethnicity, and subsequent political breakthrough, was receiving from both international media and British Chinese groups.

One month after the 2015 general election, Mak was selected to participate in the Armed Forces Parliamentary Scheme in the Royal Navy.

In June 2015, Patrick Kidd wrote in The Times that Mak had gained a reputation for "self-promotion" amongst his parliamentary colleagues and "is getting up people’s noses." It was also reported in The Spectator that Mak was prevented by Conservative MPs from sitting in his "favourite spot" behind David Cameron at Prime Minister's Questions, which Mak had hoped would enable "a brief TV appearance." When Mak was appointed a government whip in 2021, Quentin Letts tweeted: "Years of assiduous loyalty are finally rewarded. A great day for greasers". Mak's loyalty was also noted by Stephen Bush, who described him as "a long-term specialist in parliamentary questions of the 'does the minister agree with me that the government is a friend to fluffy kittens and socially responsible businesses?' variety".

Mak announced in February 2016 that he would campaign to remain in the EU in the June 2016 EU membership referendum. This decision was criticised by local party members as a political "U-turn" and received speculation in The Huffington Post as being affected by "careerism".

Every year since 2016, Mak has run two annual constituency fairs, the Community Information Fair and the Jobs, Apprenticeships, and Careers Fair. The same year he also started the Small Business Awards for recognising the best local businesses in the constituency. In 2022, he began another annual constituency fair, the Community Health and Wellbeing Fair.

In 2016, Mak founded and chaired the All-party parliamentary group (APPG) on the Fourth Industrial Revolution and has worked on future technology in Parliament.

Mak won the 2017 Newcomer Conservative MP of the Year Award in the annual cross-party MP of the Year Awards, hosted by the Speaker of the House of Commons, for organising several community events. He later won the 2021 Conservative MP of the Year Award for creating the Havant Constituency COVID-19 Local Volunteer Network.

=== 2nd term (2017–2019) ===
At the snap 2017 general election, Mak was re-elected as MP for Havant with an increased vote share of 59.8% and an increased majority of 15,956.

In June 2017, Mak was mocked by BBC presenter Simon McCoy due to his repetition of soundbites defending Theresa May. McCoy asked: "Is this a speech you have all been given to read out?" in response to Mak stating: "Our job is to make sure we form a strong and stable government" and to "provide certainty". This was in contrast to popular opinion inside Westminster and among the public, that the result had caused instability within the Conservative Party and the government. McCoy responded by saying "Alan forgive me, I don’t know where you have been for the last few days".

In 2018, Mak authored with the Centre for Policy Studies a report on modernising the NHS on its 70th birthday which included a list of ten policy proposals. Mak introduced two Private Member's Bills focused on modernising the NHS. The first calling for the banning of fax machines and pagers and the second proposing the NHS Reserves System Bill, which would create a volunteer reservist system in the NHS similar to the military reserve systems. Mak was selected to represent the United Kingdom APPG on the Fourth Industrial Revolution to the 2019 Munich Young Leaders conference, part of the Munich Security Conference.

=== 3rd term (2019–2024) ===
At the 2019 general election, Mak was again re-elected with an increased vote share of 65.4% and an increased majority of 21,792.

In 2020, Mak co-founded the Blossom Awards to "celebrate the success and contribution of the British Chinese community to the national life of the United Kingdom".

Mak has served on the executive committee of the British-American Parliamentary Group and visited the United States in 2015 as part of the United States Department of State's International Visitor Leadership Program.

On 21 April 2021, Mak was appointed a Lord Commissioner of the Treasury as a government whip. He was the designated whip for the Ministry of Defence ministers. The appointment made Mak the first British government minister of ethnic Chinese origin.

On 8 July 2022, he was appointed Exchequer Secretary to the Treasury as part of outgoing Prime Minister Boris Johnson's caretaker administration. Mak left the position on 7 September 2022, when Felicity Buchan was named as his successor in the newly formed Truss ministry. Highlights of Mak's tenure as Exchequer Secretary included responding for the government in a House of Commons debate on small brewers' relief and the wider HM Treasury review of alcohol duty and taxation, as well as visiting the Treasury's Darlington Economic Campus.

On 26 March 2024, Mak returned to government as a Parliamentary under-secretary of state, based across the Department for Business and Trade and Cabinet Office, with responsibility for economic security, industry and the Investment Security Unit, succeeding Nus Ghani.

=== 4th term (2024–) ===
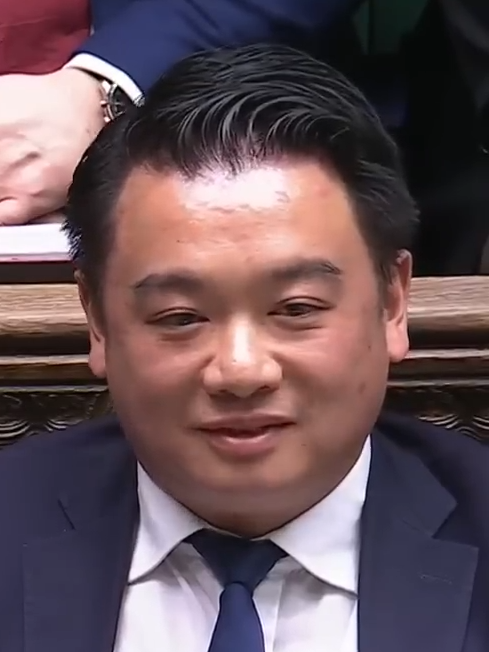
Mak on the Shadow Frontbench in 2024

At the 2024 general election, Mak was again re-elected, with a decreased vote share of 30.8% and a decreased majority of 92.

In a July 2025 reshuffle, Mak left the shadow front bench "to focus on constituency matters".

== Notes ==
Parliament of the United Kingdom
Preceded by David Willetts	Member of Parliament for Havant; 2015–present	Incumbent
