= Nus Ghani =

British politician (born 1972)

Nus Ghani MP
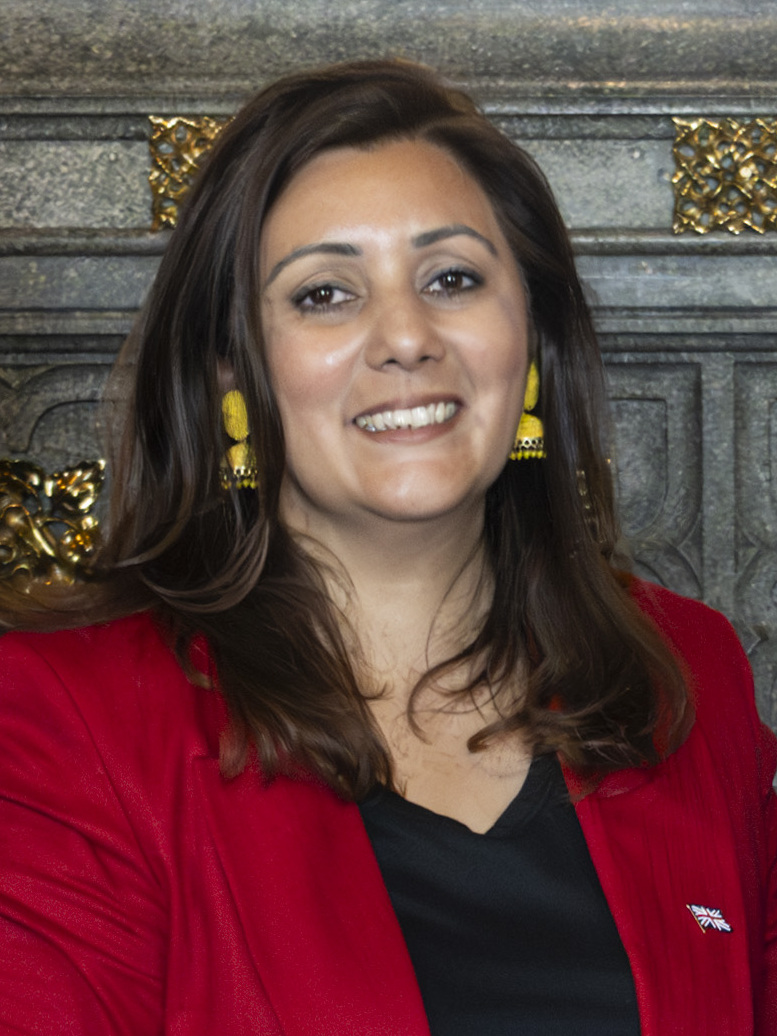
- Ghani in 2024

Deputy Speaker of the House of Commons Chairman of Ways and Means
- Incumbent
- Assumed office 23 July 2024
- Speaker: Lindsay Hoyle
- Preceded by: Eleanor Laing

Minister of State for Europe
- In office 26 March 2024 – 5 July 2024
- Prime Minister: Rishi Sunak
- Preceded by: Leo Docherty
- Succeeded by: Stephen Doughty

Minister of State for the Investment Security Unit
- In office 7 February 2023 – 26 March 2024
- Prime Minister: Rishi Sunak
- Preceded by: Office established
- Succeeded by: Alan Mak

Minister of State for Industry and Economic Security (Note: Minister of State for Industry and Investment Security from October 2022 to February 2023.)
- In office 27 October 2022 – 26 March 2024
- Prime Minister: Rishi Sunak
- Preceded by: Jackie Doyle-Price
- Succeeded by: Alan Mak

Minister of State for Science and Investment Security
- In office 7 September 2022 – 27 October 2022
- Prime Minister: Liz Truss; Rishi Sunak
- Preceded by: George Freeman
- Succeeded by: George Freeman

Lord Commissioner of the Treasury
- In office 11 July 2019 – 13 February 2020
- Prime Minister: Theresa May; Boris Johnson
- Preceded by: Paul Maynard
- Succeeded by: Iain Stewart

Parliamentary Under-Secretary of State for Aviation and Maritime
- In office 9 January 2018 – 13 February 2020
- Prime Minister: Theresa May; Boris Johnson
- Preceded by: Paul Maynard
- Succeeded by: Kelly Tolhurst

Assistant Government Whip
- In office 9 January 2018 – 11 July 2019
- Prime Minister: Theresa May

Member of Parliament for Sussex Weald Wealden (2015–2024)
- Incumbent
- Assumed office 7 May 2015
- Preceded by: Charles Hendry
- Majority: 6,842 (13.9%)

Personal details
- Born: Nusrat Munir Ul-Ghani; 1 September 1972 (age 54) Dadyal, Pakistan Administered Kashmir, Pakistan
- Party: Conservative
- Spouse: David Wheeldon (m. 2002)
- Children: 1
- Education: Birmingham City University (BA); University of Leeds (MA)
- Website: Official website

Nusrat Munir Ul-Ghani (born 1 September 1972) is a British Conservative Party politician and Member of Parliament (MP) for Sussex Weald since 2024, having represented the predecessor constituency Wealden from 2015 to 2024. She has served as Chairman of Ways and Means, the senior Deputy Speaker of the House of Commons since 2024.

Ghani served as Minister of State for Europe in 2024. She has previously served as Minister of State for Industry and Economic Security and Minister of State for the Investment Security Unit. In January 2018, she became the first female Muslim minister to speak from the House of Commons despatch box.

From 2018 to 2020, Ghani was Parliamentary Under-Secretary of State for Aviation and Maritime and a Lord Commissioner of HM Treasury under prime ministers Theresa May and Boris Johnson. After having served as vice-chair of the 1922 Committee, she was appointed Minister of State for Science and Investment Security by Liz Truss in September 2022.

== Early life and career ==
Ghani was born in Pakistan-administered Kashmir on 1 September 1972. Ghani was educated at Bordesley Green Girls' School in Birmingham. She studied at Birmingham City University, graduating with a BA in government and politics, and later gained a master's degree at Leeds University in international relations.

She was employed by the charities Age UK and Breakthrough Breast Cancer, and later by the BBC World Service.

Ghani first stood as a parliamentary candidate for Birmingham Ladywood at the 2010 general election, finishing third.

== Parliamentary career ==
Following the announcement of sitting MP Charles Hendry's retirement at the next election, Ghani was selected in December 2013 at an open primary in which anyone on the electoral register in Wealden could attend and vote. The primary attracted nearly 400 residents. In the 2015 general election Ghani became the first female MP to hold the seat, being elected with a majority of 22,967. In the 2017 general election Ghani won 61.2% of the votes, increasing her majority to 23,628.

In July 2015, she was appointed as a member of the Home Affairs Select Committee and served until 2017. In 2016, Ghani worked with Barnardo's, the UK's oldest children's charity, to undertake an independent inquiry into harmful child sexual behaviour.

In July 2017, Ghani was promoted to Parliamentary Private Secretary at the Home Office. Ghani was involved in producing reports on home affairs, security, hate crime, policing and immigration. That year, she also chaired the Government's Apprenticeship Diversity Champions Network.

As a supporter of Brexit, in December 2017 she described Sir John Sawers, the ex-MI6 chief, as providing only "gloom and doom" about Brexit.

In January 2018, Ghani was appointed an Assistant Whip and a Minister within the Department for Transport, including responsibility for shipping. Ghani was the first female Muslim minister to speak from the House of Commons despatch box. During the 2020 British cabinet reshuffle, Ghani was dismissed from government and replaced by Kelly Tolhurst in the Department for Transport. She had earlier been discussed as a contender to oversee the High Speed 2 rail line construction. While without ministerial office, the MP acted as paid independent chairperson of the supervisory board of the Belfast Maritime Consortium, founded by Artemis Technologies, which attracted some criticism.

Although she voted for the second COVID-19 lockdown in 2020, Ghani was a steering committee member of the lockdown-sceptic COVID Recovery Group, a group of Conservative MPs who opposed the UK government's December 2020 lockdown.

In September 2020, Ghani "launched an inquiry with the Business, Energy and Industrial Strategy Committee exploring how it can look at the UK Uyghur supply chain." The report outlined a series of recommendations to address the use of Uyghur forced labour in UK business supply chains. Ghani was instrumental in the cross-party campaign for the introduction of the Genocide Amendment to the Trade Bill. On 26 March 2021, as a consequence of Ghani's condemnation of the People's Republic of China's treatment of the Uyghurs, it was announced that Ghani was one of five MPs to be sanctioned by China. The sanctions were condemned by the Prime Minister and led the Foreign Secretary to summon the Chinese ambassador. On 22 April 2021, Ghani tabled a Motion before the House of Commons declaring that Parliament recognises that China is perpetrating genocide and crimes against humanity against the Uyghurs. This motion was passed unanimously. The sanctions on Ghani were lifted on 30 January 2026 during a visit by Prime Minister Keir Starmer to China.

As of January 2022, she was a vice-chair of the 1922 Committee.

In January 2022, Ghani said she was dismissed as a transport minister in 2020 because she was a Muslim. She said that a government whip had told her that, in the Downing Street meeting that decided her removal, her Muslimness was raised as an issue. The Conservative Chief Whip, Mark Spencer, came forward as the person who spoke to Ghani and said the allegations were untrue. The Justice Secretary and Deputy Prime Minister Dominic Raab said the allegations were serious and called on Ghani to make a formal complaint in order to allow an investigation to take place.

On 21 November 2022, Ghani became industry minister, the fourth holder of the post in 2022 and the ninth in four years, succeeding Jackie Doyle-Price. On 26 March 2024, Ghani replaced Leo Docherty as Minister of State for Europe, her previous role being taken by Alan Mak.

For the 2024 general election on 4 July, the Wealden seat's boundaries were redrawn as Sussex Weald, for which Ghani was elected, with a lower majority. On 23 July 2024 Ghani was elected Deputy Speaker in the House of Commons. Part of the role of Chairman of Ways and Means involves presiding over the budget speech.

== Personal life ==
Ghani married David Wheeldon in 2002 and has one child.

== Notes ==
Parliament of the United Kingdom
Preceded by Charles Hendry	Member of Parliament for Wealden; 2015–2024	Constituency abolished
New constituency	Member of Parliament for Sussex Weald; 2024–present	Incumbent
Preceded by Dame Eleanor Laing	Chair of Ways and Means; 2024–present	Incumbent
