= British-American Parliamentary Group =

All Party Parliamentary Group in the British parliament

The British-American Parliamentary Group is a group consisting of members of the Parliament of the United Kingdom. "The objects of the British-American Parliamentary Group are to promote friendly relations and mutual understanding between Members of both Houses of Parliament of the United Kingdom and Members of both Houses of Congress of the United States of America; to discuss problems common to the United Kingdom and the United States; to exchange courtesies and to provide opportunities for discussion with Senators, members of the House of Representatives, and other distinguished citizens of the United States; and to arrange for the exchange of visits and information between legislators of both countries." Its co-presidents are the Speaker of the House of Commons and the Lord Speaker, among the vice presidents are former Speakers of the House of Commons, one former prime minister, the current deputy prime minister, former leaders of the opposition, and former foreign secretaries. The chairman is the prime minister. There are currently over 600 members from both the Labour and Conservative parties.

The group is an autonomous body within parliament, therefore they appoint their own staff to carry out the group's proceedings. The British American Parliamentary Group was founded just before the start of World War II in 1937 in hopes of creating closer relations between the members of Congress and Parliament. It was initially funded by the British Government and is now being financed through a combination of a grant from the House of Commons and the members' subscriptions. In 1967 they formally adopted rules and objectives and have made a few amendments since then. There are currently 14 rules and objectives.

In 2012 the British-American Parliamentary Group celebrated their 35th anniversary of connecting British Members of Parliament with U.S. members of Congress. While the group has been around since the late 1930s, MPs did not start visiting Congress members until 1977. The exchange allows for participants to network with each other, learn about the different political processes of the two countries and discuss different policies. The MPs and Congress members were matched up at the beginning of the week, they were able to shadow the Congress members both in D.C. and in their home congressional districts.

In 2014, 4 MPs (members of parliament) spent a week in D.C. meeting with United States Congressmen, visiting the different government departments such as the Department of Defense, the White House and the Library of Congress. The purpose of the visit and the meetings that ensued were to inform the MPs of how the US political process works, policy development, and the structure of the federal government.

== See also ==
- Atlantic Council
- British-American Project
