= Secretary of State in the Cabinet Office =

Member of the Cabinet of the United Kingdom

United Kingdom Secretary of State in the Cabinet Office
- Royal Arms of His Majesty's Government
- Cabinet Office
- Style: The Right Honourable (within the UK and Commonwealth)
- Status: Secretary of state Minister of the Crown
- Member of: Cabinet; Privy Council
- Reports to: The Prime Minister
- Seat: Westminster
- Appointer: The Crown on advice of the Prime Minister
- Term length: At His Majesty's pleasure
- Formation: 9 February 2023
- First holder: Oliver Dowden
- Final holder: Oliver Dowden
- Abolished: 5 July 2024
- Salary: £159,038 per annum(2022) (including £86,584 MP salary)
- Website: www.cabinetoffice.gov.uk

The secretary of state in the Cabinet Office was a secretary of state in the government of the United Kingdom, responsible for the work of the Cabinet Office. The position was created on 9 February 2023. The position was unusually styled as secretary of state in rather than secretary of state for, the style used by other secretaries of state in the United Kingdom. The position was abolished in July 2024 when the Starmer ministry was formed immediately after the 2024 general election.

== List ==
Portrait	Name (Birth–Death)	Term of office		Roles Held	Party	Prime Minister
	Oliver Dowden; MP for Hertsmere (1978–)	9 February 2023	5 July 2024	Chancellor of the Duchy of Lancaster; Deputy Prime Minister of the United Kingdom (from 21 April 2023)	Conservative	Rishi Sunak
