= Jonathan Hill, Baron Hill of Oareford =

British Conservative politician (born 1960)

The Right Honourable The Lord Hill of Oareford CBE PC
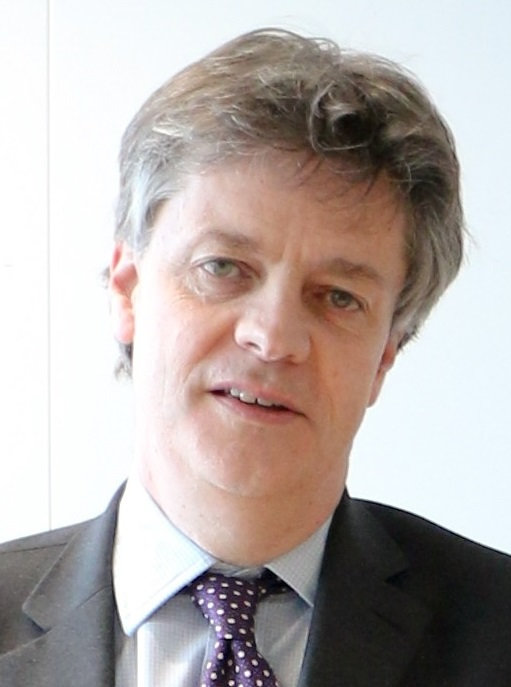
- Hill in 2015

European Commissioner for Financial Stability, Financial Services and Capital Markets Union
- In office 1 November 2014 – 15 July 2016
- Commission: Juncker
- Preceded by: Michel Barnier
- Succeeded by: Valdis Dombrovskis

Leader of the House of Lords
- In office 7 January 2013 – 15 July 2014
- Prime Minister: David Cameron
- Preceded by: The Lord Strathclyde
- Succeeded by: The Baroness Stowell of Beeston

Chancellor of the Duchy of Lancaster
- In office 7 January 2013 – 15 July 2014
- Prime Minister: David Cameron
- Preceded by: The Lord Strathclyde
- Succeeded by: Oliver Letwin

Parliamentary Under-Secretary of State for Schools
- In office 13 May 2010 – 7 January 2013
- Prime Minister: David Cameron
- Preceded by: Diana Johnson
- Succeeded by: The Lord Nash

Member of the House of Lords
- Lord Temporal
- Life peerage 27 May 2010

Political Secretary to the Prime Minister of the United Kingdom
- In office 1992–1994
- Prime Minister: John Major
- Preceded by: Judith Chaplin
- Succeeded by: Howell James

Personal details
- Born: Jonathan Hopkin Hill; 24 July 1960 (age 66) London, England
- Party: Conservative
- Spouse: Alexandra Nettelfield
- Children: 3
- Education: Trinity College, Cambridge

Jonathan Hopkin Hill, Baron Hill of Oareford (born 24 July 1960) is a British Conservative politician and former European Commissioner for Financial Stability, Financial Services and Capital Markets Union. Hill was Leader of the House of Lords and Chancellor of the Duchy of Lancaster from 2013 to 2014. Prior to that, he served as Parliamentary Under-Secretary of State for Schools from 2010 to 2013 in the Conservative-Lib Dem Government.

Hill, a former political lobbyist and PR consultant, was special adviser to Cabinet Minister Kenneth Clarke and an adviser to the Conservative Prime Minister John Major before being appointed a Government Minister in 2010. Prime Minister David Cameron put Hill's name forward, on 15 July 2014, to be the next British EU Commissioner, upon which Lord Hill resigned from the Cabinet. On 10 September 2014, President Juncker appointed Hill as the European Commissioner for Financial Stability, Financial Services and Capital Markets Union.

He took office as Britain's representative in the Juncker Commission on 1 November 2014 but announced his resignation on 25 June 2016 following the referendum in the UK to leave the EU, leaving office on 15 July.

== Early life and education ==
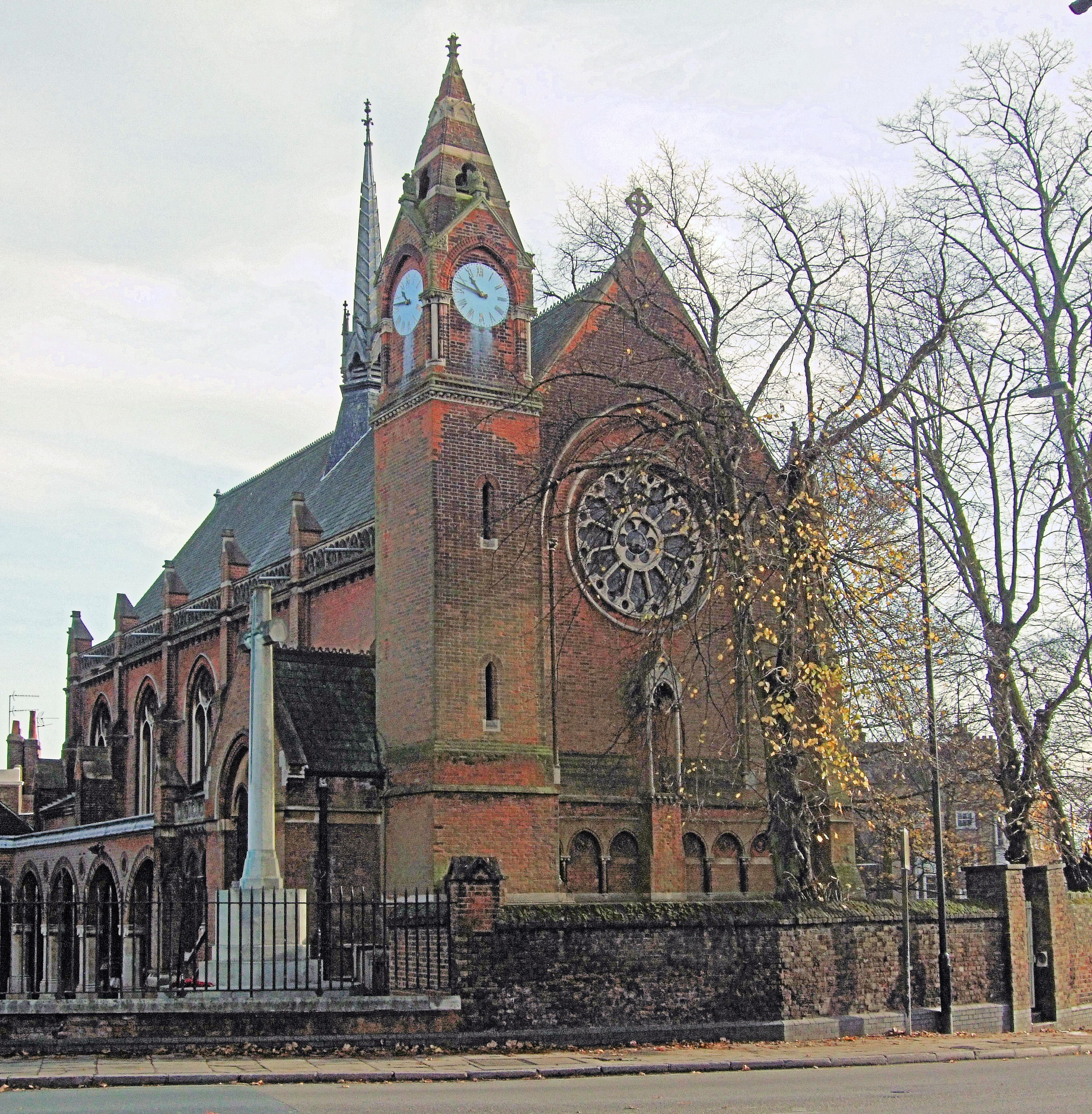
Highgate School

Jonathan Hill was born in Cockfosters, London, on 24 July 1960, the youngest child of Rowland Louis Hill and Paddy Marguerite née Henwood. He was educated at Highgate School, then an independent all-boys school in Highgate village, North London, before going to Trinity College, Cambridge, where he read History, graduating with the degree of Master of Arts (MA).

== Career ==
Hill worked in the Conservative Research Department (1985–86), before becoming a Special Adviser to Kenneth Clarke at the Department of Employment, Department of Trade and Industry and Department of Health until 1989. After working for Lowe Bell Communications (1989–91), he joined the Number 10 Policy Unit (1991–92) and served as Political Secretary to PM John Major and Head of the Prime Minister's Political Office (1992–94) during the Maastricht Treaty negotiations. He was appointed CBE in the 1995 New Year Honours List.

Subsequently, Hill worked at Bell Pottinger from 1994 until 1998 as a senior consultant, before leaving to become a founding director of Quiller Consultants.

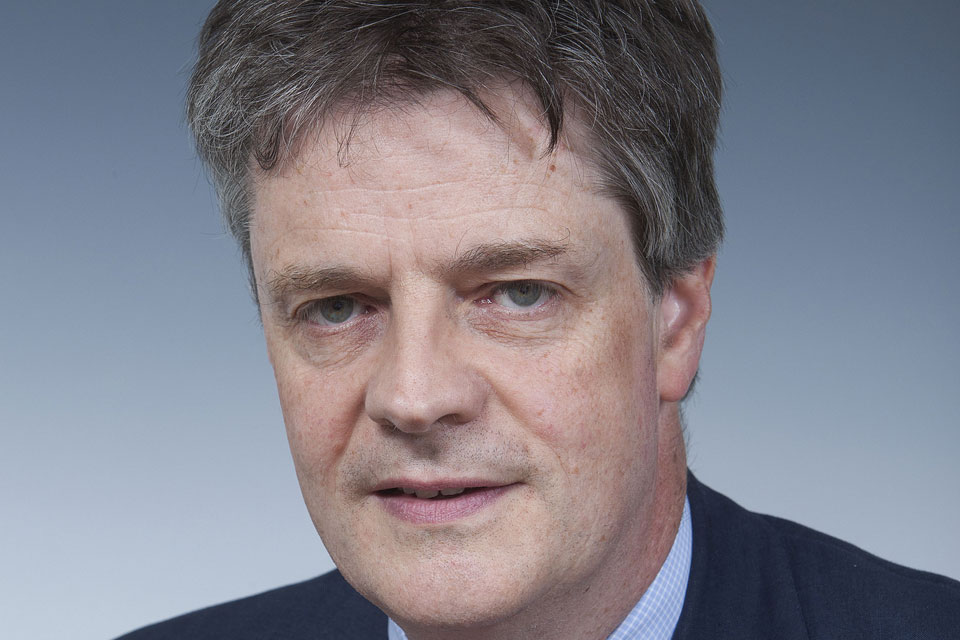
Official portrait, 2010s

On 27 May 2010, he was created a life peer as Baron Hill of Oareford, of Oareford, in the County of Somerset, and was introduced to the House of Lords on the same day, taking office as Parliamentary Under-Secretary of State for Schools in the Department for Education. There are reports (contradicted by Hill) that in July 2012, he attempted, unsuccessfully, to resign as a minister.

Lord Hill succeeded Lord Strathclyde as Leader of the House of Lords, Chancellor of the Duchy of Lancaster and Leader of the Conservative Party in the House of Lords in January 2013, and was sworn of the Privy Council.

=== EU Commissioner, October 2014 - July 2016 ===
In July 2014, Prime Minister David Cameron nominated Lord Hill to be UK European Commissioner under Jean-Claude Juncker, President-elect of the European Commission, aiming for a "top economic portfolio". Cameron's nomination, rather than that of a better-known British politician, was regarded as controversial at that time since Hill had allegedly expressed initial reluctance to serve in Brussels; two former Conservative Party leaders, Michael Howard and William Hague, had both reportedly turned down this opportunity and it appeared David Cameron was keen to avoid triggering a potentially difficult by-election by nominating any other sitting Conservative MP. Juncker stated after his election that female and high-profile candidates would be among his preferred choices, prompting speculation by some that Cameron's nomination – of a virtually unknown male in European political circles, despite his competence – to be a protest against Juncker whose election he had opposed.

On 10 September 2014 Lord Hill was announced as EU Commissioner-designate for the Financial Stability, Financial Services and Capital Markets Union portfolio in the forthcoming Juncker Commission. This newly created Directorate-General is tasked with assimilating existing EU expertise as well as responsibility for ensuring that the European Commission remains vigilant over the banking and financial sectors and remains pro-active in implementing new supervisory and regulatory rules accordingly, save overseeing pay in the financial sector where Lord Hill and Elżbieta Bieńkowska will share joint responsibility. He was one of four appointees who allegedly "struggled to impress" at their initial confirmation hearings before the European Parliament, and was required to appear for a second hearing — leading some hostile MEPs to start speculating that his appointment could be revoked in a reshuffle. With some "diplomatic smoothing of the way by Juncker", Hill it is said "managed" to give satisfactory answers as to the UK's position regarding European banking union.

Lord Hill secured the endorsement of sceptical MEPs at his second EU hearing in Brussels.

Lord Hill announced his resignation from his post of European Commissioner on 25 June 2016, to take effect on 15 July 2016, following the result of the referendum on the UK's membership of the European Union.

=== Ditchley Foundation ===
Hill is the chairperson of the Ditchley Foundation, an organisation established to promote Atlanticism in 1958.

== Personal life ==
In 1988 Hill married Alexandra Jane, daughter of Major John Nettelfield MC, a British Army officer who served with distinction in the Royal Artillery during World War II; Lord and Lady Hill have a son and two daughters.

He holds shareholdings in Huntsworth plc, an international public relations company. In January 2013, The Independent stated he reportedly held at least £50,000+ worth of shares in the company which bought Quiller in 2006 for £5.9m, headed by Conservative parliamentarian Lord Chadlington.

== Bibliography ==
- Too Close to Call: John Major, Power and Politics in No.10; by Sarah Hogg & Jonathan Hill, Little Brown (1995), ISBN 0-316-87716-6

== Honours ==
- Life Peer as Baron Hill of Oareford, of Oareford, in the County of Somerset (created 27 May 2010)
- CBE (1995)

Government offices
Preceded by Judith Chaplin	Political Secretary to the Prime Minister; 1992–1994	Succeeded by Howell James
Political offices
Preceded by The Lord Strathclyde	Leader of the House of Lords; 2013–2014	Succeeded by The Baroness Stowell of Beeston
Preceded by The Lord Strathclyde	Chancellor of the Duchy of Lancaster; 2013–2014	Succeeded by Oliver Letwin
Preceded by Catherine Ashton	British European Commissioner; 2014–2016	Succeeded by Julian King
Preceded by Michel Barnier as European Commissioner for Internal Market and Services	European Commissioner for Financial Stability, Financial Services and Capital Markets Union; 2014–2016	Succeeded by Valdis Dombrovskis
Party political offices
Preceded by The Lord Strathclyde	Leader of the Conservative Party in the House of Lords; 2013–2014	Succeeded by The Baroness Stowell of Beeston
Orders of precedence in the United Kingdom
Preceded by The Lord Bichard	Gentlemen; Baron Hill of Oareford	Followed by The Lord Wei
