= Howell James =

British communications adviser

Howell James CBE
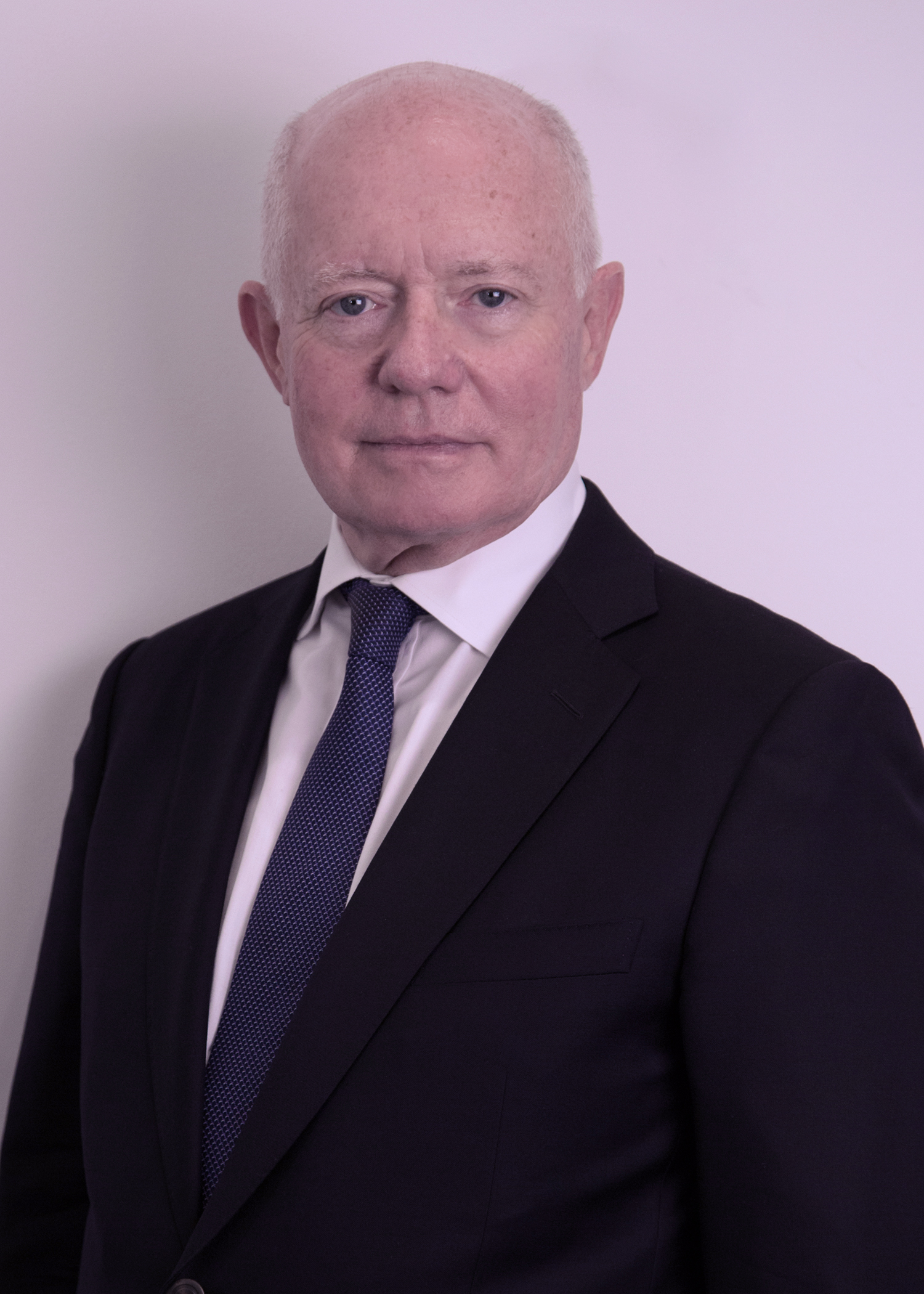
- Photo: Howell James

Political Secretary to the Prime Minister of the United Kingdom
- In office November 1994 – May 1997
- Prime Minister: John Major
- Preceded by: Jonathan Hill
- Succeeded by: Sally Morgan

Personal details
- Born: Central London
- Education: Mill Hill School
- Occupation: Communications adviser

Howell James CBE is a communications adviser and former Vice-Chairman of Corporate Affairs at Barclays. He has had a long career as a communications adviser in government, broadcasting, and multi-national business. In 2015 he was appointed the CEO of Quiller Consultants, a strategic public affairs firm based in Mayfair. He left the post in August 2017.

== Early life ==
James was born in Central London in March 1954, and lived in Bedford Square for most of his childhood. He was educated at Mill Hill School, a non-conformist Christian Foundation boarding school in North West London. Following his mother's death in 1971 and father's subsequent remarriage a year later, James left school, forgoing university. he spent three years as trainee account executive at advertising agency Masius Wynne-Williamsig before later taking up a position at Capital London.

== Broadcasting ==
Founded in 1973, Capital Radio was London's first independent station. James worked with an early team of DJs including Kenny Everett, Roger Scott, Michael Aspel and Graham Dene. In his role at the station James ran the promotional and publicity activity, including The Best Disco in Town at the Lyceum Theatre on the Strand. Later, James formed part of the management team as Head of Publicity at the launch of TVam with David Frost, Peter Jay (diplomat), Angela Rippon, Anna Ford, Robert Kee and Michael Parkinson. James described his time working for the channel as 'a great blooding'. Following the initial launch period, James went on to work with Greg Dyke and Bruce Gyngell during which time TV-am's programmes were presented by Anne Diamond and Nick Owen.

After the 1987 General Election, James left Her Majesty's Government to become Corporate Affairs Director at BBC under the stewardship of Director General Michael Checkland. At 33, James was the youngest ever director at the BBC, his role focused on justifying the benefits of the BBC to the Government and the public during the charter renewal debate. In 1991, Checkland asked James, and policy chief Patricia Hodgson, to look at the programme and channel mix. Alongside Deputy Director General John Birt, James worked on expanding the BBC's current affairs division.

== Government ==
After leaving TVam, James took up the position of Special Adviser to Lord Young at the Cabinet Office and later at the Departments of Employment and Trade and Investment. James worked with Lord Young throughout the 1987 general election campaign.

In 1992 James left the BBC to join Lord Young again, this time at Cable and Wireless before being sought out by John Major who offered James a position at No.10 in 1994. James worked with Major throughout his premiership until the 1997 general election. He stayed on working with Major in opposition until William Hague took over as party leader.

In 2004 James returned to Westminster after the Cabinet Secretary Sir Andrew Turnbull and Prime Minister Tony Blair asked him to become Permanent Secretary of Government Communications. This move followed on the back of controversy created by the government's attempts to influence reporters. A Tory admirer referred to James' appointment in the following terms: 'You could say the man who rescued TV-AM from disaster had arrived to do the same for the government.' James took over as the senior civil servant for 5000 communicators across government in 22 department and agencies and was tasked with mending relations with the media and across government following the publication of the Hutton Report. James described his time as Permanent Secretary for Government Communications as "testing" particularly when he had to manage the Government's response to the 2005 London Underground Bombings.

== Corporate communications ==
James left Westminster in 1997 to set up his own Public Relations consultancy firm, Brown Lloyd James with Sir Nicholas Lloyd, the former editor of the Daily Express, and Peter Brown (music manager). BLJ worked on a number of high-profile transatlantic clients including Sir Andrew Lloyd Webber, Michael Eisner, the Walt Disney Corporation, and Ralph Lauren.

James joined Barclays in summer of 2008 He was responsible for group's media and government relations, corporate communications and global community initiative. He worked with Barclay's chairman Marcus Agius, CEO John Varley and Investment Bank CEO Bob Diamond over the next several years of difficulties for the bank.

He departed Barclays in 2012 and took up a position at the international auction house Christie's. James was responsible for all internal and external communications activity and corporate reputation spanning Europe, US and Asia. He left Christies in 2014 to head up Quiller Consultants, a strategic communications and public affairs firm specialising in strategic communications and reputation management, it forms part of the Huntsworth Group. He was appointed CEO following the departure Sean Worth earlier that year.

== Personal life ==
James lives in Central London with his partner Dan May, a former style director at online retailer Mr Porter, and current freelance stylist and fashion editor. He has been close with Peter Mandelson and Reinaldo Avila da Silva, and had dated da Silva previously. He is the co-owner of a luxury boutique hotel in Marrakech, El Fenn, which he purchased in 2002 with entrepreneur Vanessa Branson. He sits on the board of Trustees of the British Council and was on the board during the Foreign and Commonwealth Office's Triennial Review of the organisation.

James joined the board of the Chichester Theatre Festival in 2006 and worked closely with the management team. He recently stood down after nine years on the Board. He was appointed a CBE in August 1997 for political services to the realm.

Government offices
Preceded by Pat McFadden	Political Secretary to the Prime Minister; 1994–1997	Succeeded by Joe Irvin
