= Lord Parkinson =

Lord Parkinson may refer to:

- Cecil Parkinson, Baron Parkinson (1931–2016), British accountant and cabinet minister
- Stephen Parkinson, Baron Parkinson of Whitley Bay (born 1983), British special adviser and politician
