= Gerard Russell =

Gerard Russell may refer to:

- Gerard Russell (politician) (1620–1682), English politician
- Gerard Russell (diplomat), British diplomat and author
