= Quiller Consultants =

British lobbying and public relations firm

Quiller Consultants is a British lobbying and public relations firm based in Westminster in central London that has close links to the Conservative party.

The company was formed in 1998 by John Eisenhammer, a former journalist with The Independent and Jonathan Hill, a former Whitehall mandarin. Both had previously worked at Bell Pottinger and Hill was later made a life peer by the Conservatives. In 2006, Quiller was acquired by Huntsworth, a company owned by Peter Gummer who ran the Conservative party in David Cameron's constituency.

== Employees ==
Current or former employees include:

- Gerard Russell - a former British diplomat in the Middle East who was in charge of Quilter's work on behalf of the United Arab Emirates including briefing journalists to write negative articles on Qatar.
- George Bridges - former political director for David Cameron and a Conservative life peer since 2015.
- Howell James - former adviser to John Major and the CEO of Quiller from 2014 to 2017.
- Sarah Jones - Labour MP for Croydon.
- Stephen Parkinson - previously worked for David Cameron and was later appointed as an adviser to Theresa May
- Sean Worth - former adviser to David Cameron.

== Clients ==
- A4e
- British Land
- Capita
- CDC Group
- City of London Corporation - during the Occupy London protests.
- The Co-operative Group during the scandal surrounding chairman Paul Flower's drug use.
- HSBC
- MigrationWatch UK
- PricewaterhouseCoopers
- Telefonica
- Tesco
- United Arab Emirates
