= Radio, Electrical and Television Retailers' Association =

Trade association

- Abbreviation: RETRA
- Formation: 5 June 1942
- Type: Trade association
- Legal status: Non profit company (no. 374327)
- Headquarters: RETRA House, St John's Terrace, 1 Ampthill Street, Bedford, MK42 9EY
- Region served: UK
- Members: c. 1400 audio, electrical and television retailers (c. 2,300 retail outlets)
- Chief Executive: Bryan Lovewell
- Main organ: RETRA Council (President - Steve Norman)
- Website: RETRA

The Radio, Electrical and Television Retailers' Association is the main trade association for independent electronic (including television and audio) retailers in the United Kingdom. It was formed in 1942.

== Structure ==
It is situated in the unitary authority of Bedford, off Ampthill Road (A6), near Bedford St Johns railway station. It is the UK's largest trade association for electrical and electronic retailers.

It holds an annual conference in April each year, which first began in 1961.

== Purpose ==
A register of accredited members (retailers) is available on the website. This is a resource to find nearby reputable suppliers, especially in a recent years with the digital switchover – potentially lucrative for television retailers, with much (analogue) equipment becoming obsolete.

Because most terminology regarding electrical and electronic equipment is beyond the average consumer, purchasers can be easily misled by confusing sales talk, or prefer not to ask 'dumb' questions. Retailers may take advantage of this situation, and RETRA seeks to prevent any unethical sales practices that pull the wool over consumers' eyes, by including a code of practice that retailers belonging to RETRA must follow, which seeks to protect the consumer. The Office of Fair Trading (quango) seeks to cover consumers generally, but simply does not have the time or manpower to identify problems in every avenue of retailing. RETRA provides the in-depth knowledge that the OFT could never have.

== See also ==
- Communications Select Committee
