= Lord Gummer =

Lord Gummer may refer to either of the following Conservative Party life peers:

- Peter Gummer, Baron Chadlington
- John Gummer (Baron Deben)
