= Stephen Sherbourne, Baron Sherbourne of Didsbury =

British political secretary (born 1945)

The Right Honourable The Lord Sherbourne of Didsbury CBE
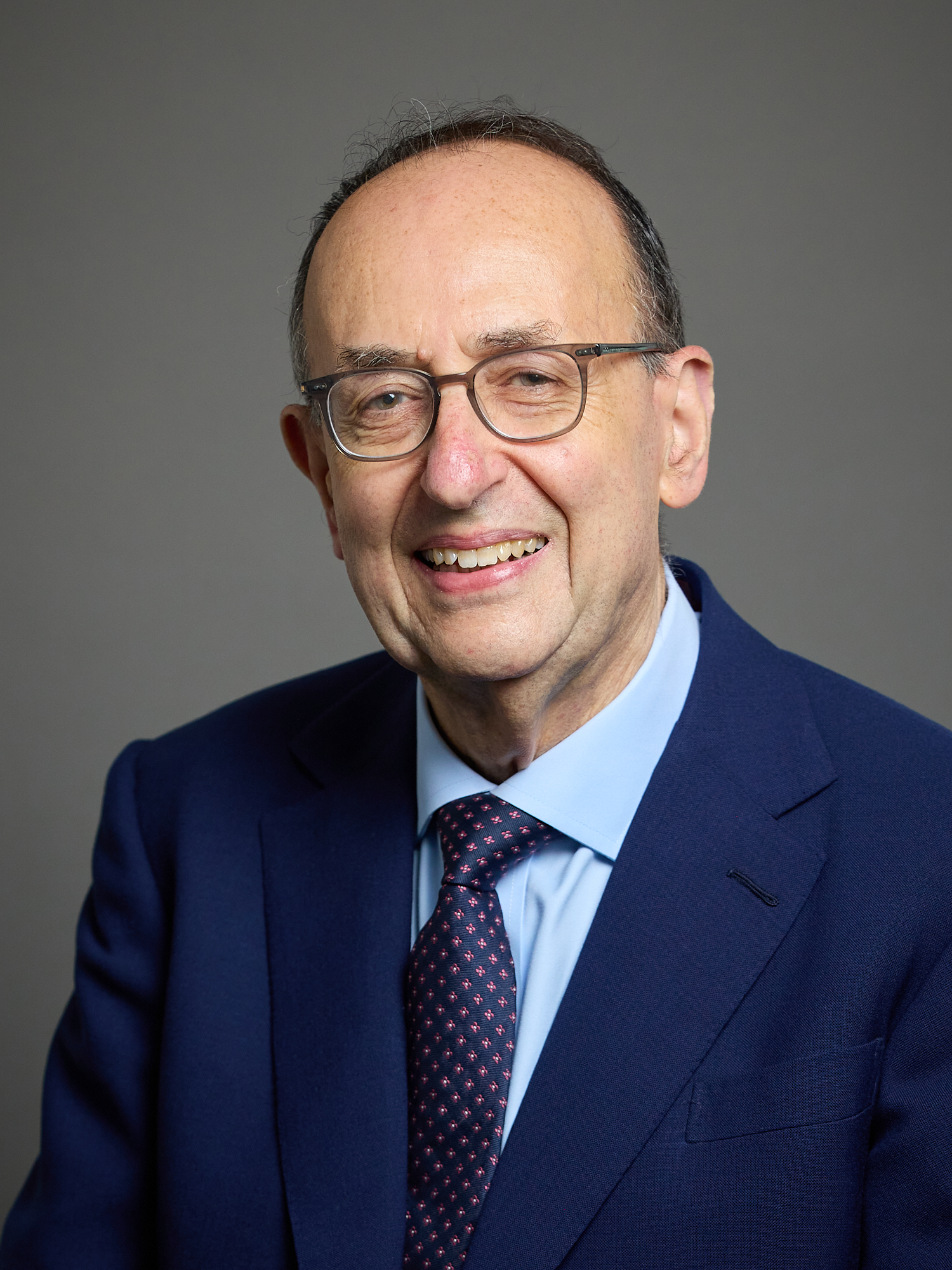
- Stephen Sherbourne in 2025

Member of the House of Lords
- Lord Temporal
- Life peerage 12 September 2013

Political Secretary to the Prime Minister of the United Kingdom
- In office 1983–1988
- Prime Minister: Margaret Thatcher
- Preceded by: Derek Howe
- Succeeded by: John Whittingdale

Personal details
- Born: 15 October 1945 (age 80) Manchester, England
- Party: Conservative
- Education: St Edmund Hall, Oxford

Stephen Ashley Sherbourne, Baron Sherbourne of Didsbury, CBE (born 15 October 1945) is a British Conservative who was Political Secretary for Prime Minister Margaret Thatcher and chief of staff to Conservative leader Michael Howard. He is currently a non-executive director of Smithfields Consultants.

He was born in Manchester, and studied Philosophy, Politics and Economics (PPE) at St Edmund Hall, Oxford. He is known for his interest for liberal democracy and the free market.

He was knighted in 2006, having previously been appointed a Commander of the Order of the British Empire (CBE) in the 1988 New Year Honours. He was created a life peer on 12 September 2013 taking the title Baron Sherbourne of Didsbury, of Didsbury in the City of Manchester.

Sherbourne is openly gay.

Orders of precedence in the United Kingdom
Preceded by The Lord Carrington of Fulham	Gentlemen; Baron Sherbourne of Didsbury	Followed by The Lord Paddick
Government offices
Preceded by Derek Howe	Political Secretary to the Prime Minister; 1983–1988	Succeeded by John Whittingdale
