= Sally Morgan, Baroness Morgan of Huyton =

British Labour Party politician (born 1959)

The Right Honourable The Baroness Morgan of Huyton
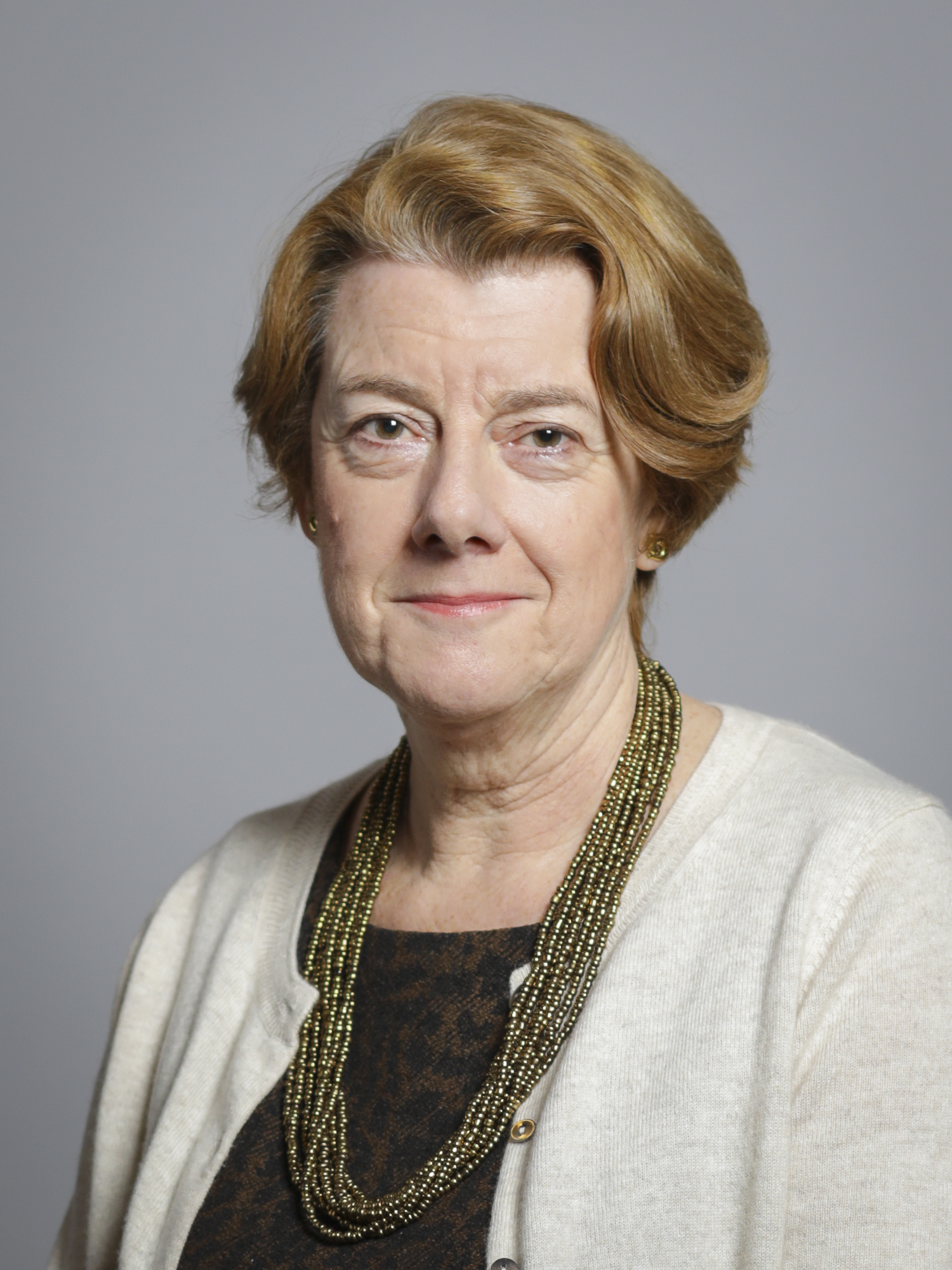
- Official portrait, 2019

Master of Fitzwilliam College, Cambridge
- Incumbent
- Assumed office 1 October 2019
- Preceded by: Nicola Padfield

Downing Street Director of Government Relations
- In office 10 November 2001 – 12 May 2005
- Prime Minister: Tony Blair
- Preceded by: Anji Hunter
- Succeeded by: Ruth Turner

Minister of State for Women
- In office 11 June 2001 – 9 November 2001 Serving with Barbara Roche
- Prime Minister: Tony Blair
- Preceded by: Tessa Jowell
- Succeeded by: Barbara Roche

Member of the House of Lords
- Lord Temporal
- Life peerage 20 June 2001

Political Secretary to the Prime Minister of the United Kingdom
- In office 1997–2001
- Prime Minister: Tony Blair
- Preceded by: Howell James
- Succeeded by: Robert Hill

Personal details
- Born: Sally Morgan; 28 June 1959 (age 67)
- Party: Labour
- Education: Durham University (BA); King's College London (PGCE); University College London (MA)

Sally Morgan, Baroness Morgan of Huyton (born 28 June 1959), is a British Labour Party politician, and Master of Fitzwilliam College, Cambridge. She is the former Chair of Ofsted.

== Early life and education ==
Morgan was educated at Belvedere School for Girls, then a direct grant grammar school in Liverpool, and at Van Mildert College of the Durham University, from where she graduated in 1980 with a Bachelor of Arts (BA) degree in geography. After taking a Postgraduate Certificate in Education (PGCE) at King's College London in 1981, she worked as a teacher at Beverley School in New Malden, Surrey from 1981 to 1985. She later received an Master of Arts (MA) in Education from the Institute of Education of the University College London. In the early 1980s, she was active in student politics. As a member of the Labour Students, she was an active member of the British Youth Council Executive Committee.

== Career ==
=== Political career ===
From 1985, she worked for the Labour Party at Walworth Road, under Neil Kinnock then later when John Smith became leader. She worked for the Party under Tony Blair before joining Blair's political office in 10 Downing Street following the 1997 general election. She was made a life peer as Baroness Morgan of Huyton, of Huyton in the County of Merseyside, on 20 June 2001.

She was Minister of State for Women in the Cabinet Office from June to November 2001 before rejoining 10 Downing Street as Director of Government Relations. Her Cabinet Office responsibilities for equal opportunities and the women's unit were transferred to Barbara Roche. She left Downing Street in 2005. She was one of the three advisors Blair was most dependent upon, along with Jonathan Powell and Alastair Campbell.

=== Business career ===
In April 2006 she was appointed a board member of the Olympic Delivery Authority. In November 2005 she was appointed as a non-executive director of The Carphone Warehouse Group plc, as well as being a non-executive director of TalkTalk from 2005 to 2010, and on the Lloyds Pharmacy health care advisory panel. She was a non-executive director of Southern Cross Healthcare from 2006 until it had severe financial problems in 2011, before the company declared insolvency the following year. She also serves as Advisor to the Board of the children's charity and Academy schools chain Absolute Return for Kids (ARK) and has been chair of the board of Trustees of The Future Leaders Trust, as well as its successor organisations, since 2006.

In July 2017 Morgan was appointed as senior non-executive director of building and support services company Carillion, serving on the audit, business integrity, nomination, remuneration and sustainability committees. The company, which had many large government contracts and 43,000 staff, went into liquidation in January 2018, with the UK Government ordering a fast-track investigation into the directors to consider possible misconduct.

=== Other work ===
In 2007 and 2008 Morgan chaired an inquiry into young adult volunteering, named The Morgan Inquiry, sponsored by the All-Party Parliamentary Scout Group and supported by The Scout Association.

She was appointed chair of Ofsted by the Conservative-led government from March 2011 and left that post in autumn 2014.

Morgan is a trustee of the Education Policy Institute, a Westminster-based research institute. She is on the board of the think tank Labour Together.

Morgan has, since February 2025, been a commentator on the Times Radio podcast How to Win An Election.

=== Academic career ===
In February 2019, it was announced that Morgan would succeed Nicola Padfield as Master of Fitzwilliam College, Cambridge in October 2019. She was officially admitted on 1 October, and is the college's 9th Master. Morgan chaired the appointment board that selected academic Jason Arday for his professorship at the University of Cambridge.

== Personal life ==
Morgan is married to barrister John Lyons, whom she met while at Durham. They have been married for 35 years and have two adult sons.

Political offices
Preceded by Tessa Jowell	Minister of State for Women; 2001	Succeeded by Barbara Roche
Government offices
Preceded by Howell James	Political Secretary to the Prime Minister; 1997–2001	Succeeded by Robert Hill
