= Syria Files =

Hacked Syrian emails released by WikiLeaks

On 5 July 2012, WikiLeaks began publishing what it called the Syria Files, a collection of more than two million emails from Syrian political figures and ministries and from companies including Finmeccanica and Brown Lloyd James dating from August 2006 to March 2012. The emails were hacked by Anonymous before being given to WikiLeaks for release.

The Syria Files mainly embarrassed the U.S. and Assad and highlighted the ties between the two, which WikiLeaks saw as proof of Western hypocrisy. WikiLeaks was criticised in 2016 for allegedly excluding an email about a money transfer to Russia.

== Release ==
The release of the files began on 5 July 2012. The database comprises 2,434,899 emails from 680 domains. At least 400,000 files are in Arabic and 68,000 files in Russian and 42,000 emails were infected with malware. According to Sarah Harrison, the goal of the release was to generate a series of in-depth stories about "the inner workings of the Syrian government and economy" and how the West and Western companies "say one thing and do another."

Media organisations working with WikiLeaks on the release include the Lebanese daily Al Akhbar, the Egyptian daily Al-Masry Al-Youm, the Italian weekly L'espresso, the German public radio and television broadcaster Norddeutscher Rundfunk (NDR) of the ARD consortium, the French information website OWNI and the Spanish website Público. The Associated Press (AP) news agency was initially announced by WikiLeaks to be helping with the release. The claim was withdrawn by WikiLeaks and an AP spokesperson stated that AP was "reviewing the emails for possible coverage [and] did not have any advance agreement on how [it] might handle the material." WikiLeaks was criticised for sharing the emails with Al Akhbar, because Al Akhbar had been accused of bias towards Syrian President Bashar al-Assad. Others said the choice would act as a balance against coverage by Western media outlets that were expected to play up Syrian crimes.

WikiLeaks released a statement saying that "In such a large collection of information, it is not possible to verify every single email at once; however, WikiLeaks and its co-publishers have done so for all initial stories to be published. We are statistically confident that the vast majority of the data are what they purport to be". Al Akhbar wrote that it was confident that "the emails are authentic, that the senders and receivers are mainly who they say they are".

WikiLeaks leader Julian Assange said that the Syria Files "helps us not merely to criticise one group or another, but to understand their interests, actions and thoughts. It is only through understanding this conflict that we can hope to resolve it." Some reporters saw the Syria Files as taking a more neutral approach, without the ideology or politics associated with previous releases, but Sarah Harrison rejected the suggestion that WikiLeaks was going "mainstream". After the first 25 emails out of an expected 2.4 million were released, Foreign Policy wrote that it believed Syrian's on the fence would be the most affected by the release, and any instances of Syrian officials opening channels with rebels could get someone killed. Foreign Policy wrote that it expected Western officials and companies to be affected by the release, but that the Syrian government was an "open book" and the emails would confirm what was already known.

== Data retrieval ==
Before the Syria Files release, in February 2012, the Haaretz published excerpts of what it said were emails hacked from Syrian servers by Anonymous. The next month, The Guardian published emails it sourced to Syrian opposition activists.

In the weeks following the Syria Files' release in July 2012, a hacktivist group of the Anonymous collective claimed credit for obtaining the emails and providing them to WikiLeaks. Anonymous stated that it had "worked day and night" in order to access computer servers in Syria and that "the data available had been so massive that downloading it had taken several weeks." Anonymous gave the data to WikiLeaks because it judged WikiLeaks to be "supremely well equipped to handle a disclosure of this magnitude". Anonymous stated that as long as Bashar al-Assad remains in power, it will continue "to assist the courageous freedom fighters and activists in Syria".

In 2016, an interview between a member of the hacktivist group RevoluSec and Al Jazeera English and 500 pages of United States sealed court records viewed by The Daily Dot gave credit to RevoluSec, whose membership overlaps with Anonymous, for the data retrieval and for its transmission to WikiLeaks. RevoluSec claimed to have had complete access to all Syrian internet routers and switches, including those of the Syrian Computer Society's SCS-Net. RevoluSec described the aims of its project as exposing censorship and human rights abuses and supporting Syrians' human rights. RevoluSec's attacks against the Syrian government lasted for about a year.

== Topics ==
The Syria Files mainly embarrassed the U.S. and Assad and highlighted the ties between the two, which WikiLeaks saw as proof of Western hypocrisy.

=== Finmeccanica ===
According to emails published by WikiLeaks on 5 July 2012, the Italian conglomerate Finmeccanica increased its sale of mobile communications equipment to Syrian authorities during 2011, delivering 500 of these to the Damascus suburb Muadamia in May 2011, after the Syrian Civil War had started, and sending engineers to Damascus in February 2012 to provide training in using the communications equipment in helicopter terminals, while the conflict continued.

=== Brown Lloyd James ===
In May 2011, the public relations firm Brown Lloyd James sent an email to Syrian authorities "on how to create the appearance it is pursuing reform while repressing the uprising", in Ynetnews' description of an email published by WikiLeaks on 6 July 2012. Brown Lloyd James recommended a public relations campaign to "create a reform 'echo-chamber' by developing media coverage outside of Syria that points to the President's difficult task of wanting reform" so that the "coverage [would] rebound into Syria". Brown Lloyd James also recommended "countering ... the daily torrent of criticism and lies" by "[a] 24-hour media monitoring and response system [that] should be in place with assets in UK and US markets; [monitoring] social media sites and [challenging and removing] false sites; and a steady, constantly updated messaging document that contains talking points geared to latest developments."

Brown Lloyd James stated that the document was not paid for, was a "'last-ditch' effort 'to encourage a peaceful outcome rather than violence', and that it was sent to Asma al-Assad, the wife of President Bashar al-Assad.

=== Bashar and Asma al-Assad ===
On 8 July 2012, Al Akhbar presented an analysis of emails by President Bashar al-Assad and his wife Asma al-Assad. Al Akhbar stated,

"Syria's first couple appear to be occupied with their representative capacities, with ample time devoted to the state of the palatial gardens, renovations, the stationary [sic] needs of low-level employees, but also issues related to bolstering the couple's image, be it via charitable efforts or through political favors.... But there is no real sense of tangible power on behalf of the First Couple present within the 'Syria Files.' What is revealed is only a façade, or perhaps fittingly, a brand calculated to cloak another system: the military-security machine, which remains as of yet tightly in control and far from prying eyes."

=== Rami Makhlouf ===
Syria Files examined by Al Akhbar show that after businessman Rami Makhlouf publicly claimed to respond to protestors' demands by "repenting" from business, selling shares and investing his money and time in charity and development projects, he continued to invest in several banks during 2011 and 2012. In late January 2012, he bought about 15 times as much shares (by value) as he sold, buying £S 127,000,000 and selling £S 8,670,000 of shares, mostly in Qatar National Bank–Syria and Syria International Islamic Bank.

== Omitted documents ==
On 9 September 2016, reporters from The Daily Dot, using information from sealed American court documents, stated that the released version of the Syria Files omitted records of a €2,000,000,000 transfer from the Central Bank of Syria to the Russian government-owned VTB Bank. The reporters were skeptical about the omission being a coincidence. Wikileaks stated that it published all of the Syria files that it had obtained and made an apparent threat against the reporters, saying that if they pursued the story, "you can be sure we will return the favor one day.".
