= Brown Lloyd James =

Public relations firm

- Industry: Public relations
- Key people: Peter Brown (music manager), Peter Brown CBE, Chairman & CEO, Howell James,
- Website: www.bljworldwide.com

Brown Lloyd James is a public relations firm with offices in New York, Washington, D.C., London, and Doha.

== Notable campaigns ==
The firm has represented a number of high-profile clients, including Al Jazeera English, the Shafallah Center for Children with Disabilities, and the Kingdom of Morocco. In 2006, the firm coordinated the launch of Al Jazeera English in the United States.

In 2011, it was criticized for working with the First Lady of Syria to organize a Vogue profile. In July 2012, Ynetnews described the firm's May 2011 email released in the Syria Files by stating that the email gave advice "on how to create the appearance it is pursuing reform while repressing the uprising". The firm responded that the document was not paid for, was a "'last-ditch' effort 'to encourage a peaceful outcome rather than violence', which the government subsequently ignored and that it was sent to Asma al-Assad, the wife of Syrian President Bashar al-Assad.

According to Foreign Agents Registration Act filings, BLJ Worldwide has run pro-Beijing propaganda campaigns on behalf of the China-United States Exchange Foundation (CUSEF), an organization with close ties to the Chinese Communist Party. In 2020 BLJ assisted Chinese diplomats in the US with writing op-eds and getting them published.

== Qatar World Cup bid ==
In 2018, The Sunday Times published claims BLJ acted for the Qatar World Cup bid. It claimed the PR firm acted to undermine rival bids from the US and Australia.
