= China-United States Exchange Foundation =

Hong Kong-based nonprofit organization

- 中美交流基金會
- Abbreviation: CUSEF
- Formation: October 2007; 19 years ago
- Founder: Tung Chee-hwa
- Founded at: Hong Kong
- Type: Nonprofit organization
- Affiliations: Chinese People's Association for Friendship with Foreign Countries
- Website: www.cusef.org.hk

The China-United States Exchange Foundation (CUSEF) is a Hong Kong-based nonprofit organization whose stated aim is to encourage dialogue and exchanges between the people of the United States and China. CUSEF was founded in 2008 by Tung Chee-hwa, a billionaire, former Chief Executive of Hong Kong, and former vice chairperson of the Chinese People's Political Consultative Conference (CPPCC), who remained the chairman emeritus of the foundation until his death in 2026. CUSEF's governing board has included members such as Ronnie Chan, Elsie Leung, and Victor Fung. Foundation donors include multiple CPPCC members.

CUSEF is supervised by the Chinese People's Association for Friendship with Foreign Countries. CUSEF donates to universities and think tanks in the U.S. while also sponsoring trips for journalists, students, and former U.S. officials and politicians to China to speak with officials. According to various journalists and academics, CUSEF is a central part of the Chinese Communist Party's united front strategy of influence in the U.S.

== History ==
According to Foreign Agents Registration Act (FARA) filings, CUSEF is classified as a "foreign principal" which has hired lobbying and public relations firms since 2009 such as Brown Lloyd James, Fontheim International, Covington & Burling, Capitol Counsel LLC, Podesta Group, and Wilson Global Communications to craft and promote pro-Beijing messages.

In 2023, CUSEF launched a campaign to lobby members of the Congressional Black Caucus.

=== Sanya Initiative ===
Since 2008, CUSEF has partnered with the China Association for International Friendly Contact and the EastWest Institute to organize forums, termed the U.S.-China Sanya Initiative, between retired People's Liberation Army (PLA) officers and retired U.S. military personnel. Past forums were reported to have attempted to influence retired U.S. military officers to lobby against U.S. arms sales to Taiwan and to delay a Pentagon report on PLA capabilities.

=== Trips for elected officials ===
In 2019, CUSEF sponsored a trip to China by a delegation of mayors from Indiana, Ohio, and South Dakota, including James Brainard and Paul TenHaken.

=== University funding and other activities ===
CUSEF has funded the Pacific Community Initiative at the Paul H. Nitze School of Advanced International Studies at Johns Hopkins University. CUSEF also provides funding to the University of Montana's Max S. Baucus Institute.

In 2018, the University of Texas at Austin refused a donation from CUSEF after a letter by Senator Ted Cruz raised concerns about the foundation's reported links to the Chinese Communist Party. In 2023, US House representatives Mike Gallagher, Ryan Zinke, and Matt Rosendale pressed the University of Montana to cut ties with CUSEF related to its funding of student trips to China. The university declined to end the program. Its president, Seth Bodnar, said the program was "in complete compliance with state and federal law" and that the university's responsibility was to "expand learning experiences for our students so that America can compete and win around the globe." A university spokesman said CUSEF was not listed on the federal Consolidated Screening List and that the university complied with a Montana law requiring disclosure of partnerships with foreign countries of concern. In January 2026, CUSEF organized a trip to China for a group of Harvard University students where they met with Lu Kang of the International Department of the Chinese Communist Party.

=== Foundation grants ===
In 2021, CUSEF gave a $5 million grant to the George H.W. Bush Foundation for U.S.-China Relations. CUSEF also provides funding to the Carter Center and has partnered with the Carnegie Endowment for International Peace, Brookings Institution, Atlantic Council, and Center for American Progress.

=== Hong Kong Forum on US-China Relations ===
CUSEF periodically holds the "Hong Kong Forum on US-China Relations" to facilitate exchanges between present and former officials, academics, and business leaders in the US, China, and other nations. In 2023, speakers attending the forum include former US ambassador to China and ex-senator Max Baucus, former US Trade Negotiator Charlene Barshefsky and President of the 70th Session of the UN General Assembly Mogens Lykketoft.

==== Hong Kong Forum 2024 ====
The forum in 2024 included speeches from Xie Feng, China's ambassador to the United States, and Nicholas Burns, the US ambassador to China delivered through video. The forum was attended by former ambassador Max Baucus, the 12th United States Trade Representative Charlene Barshefsky, representatives from families of former US president Carter, Nixon, and Bush.

John Moolenaar, chairman of the United States House Select Committee on Strategic Competition between the United States and the Chinese Communist Party, and Fox News has criticized US officials from attending the forum, stating that it would "legitimize the CCP event."
