= John McTernan =

British political adviser (born 1959)

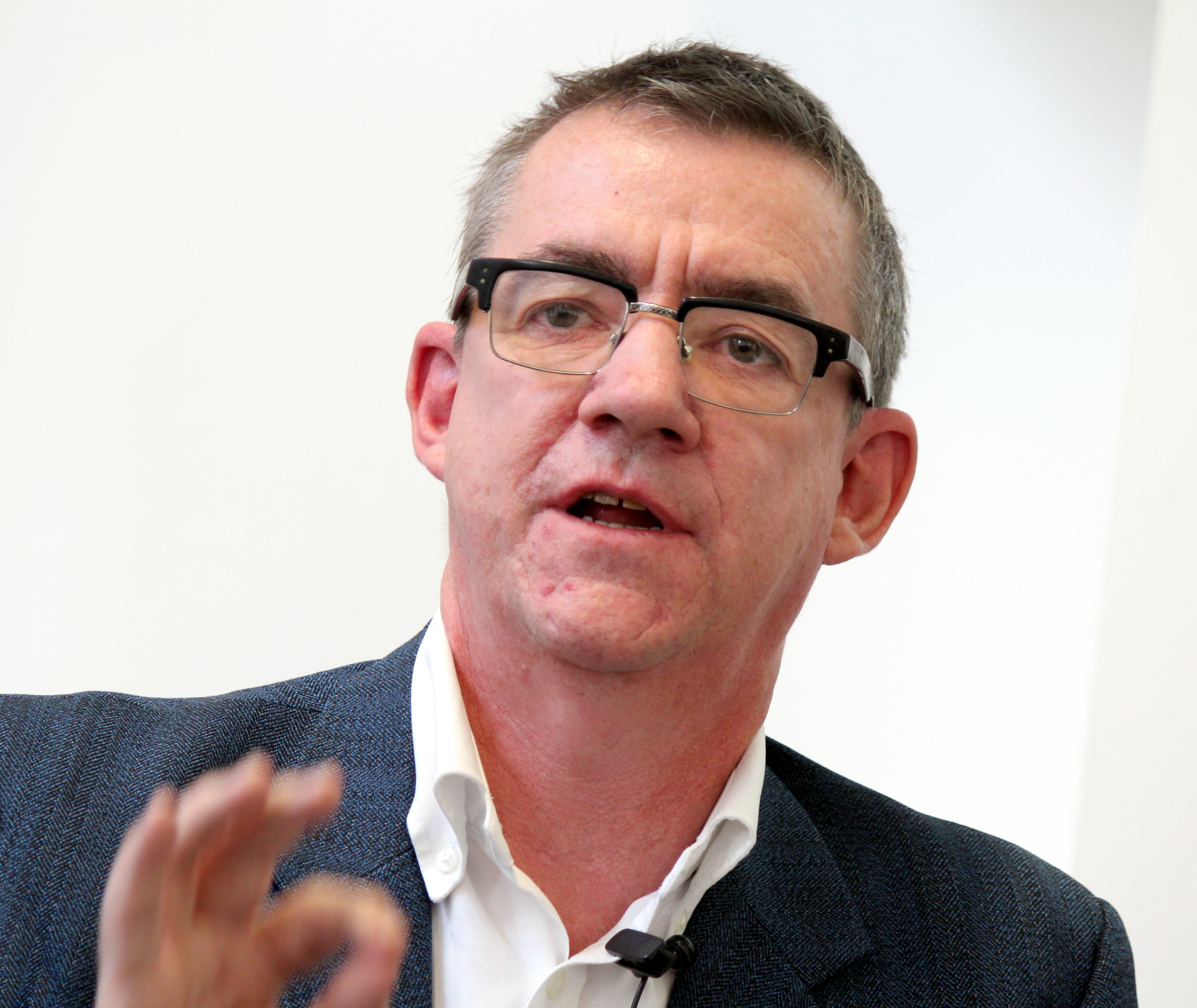
- McTernan at Policy Exchange, November 2014

Political Secretary to the Prime Minister of the United Kingdom
- In office 2005–2007
- Prime Minister: Tony Blair
- Preceded by: Pat McFadden
- Succeeded by: Joe Irvin

Personal details
- Born: John McTernan; 1959 (age 66–67) London, England
- Education: Firrhill High School
- Alma mater: University of Edinburgh

John McTernan (born 1959) is a British political strategist and commentator. He has been a political adviser to the Labour Party.

McTernan was Prime Minister Tony Blair's Director of Political Operations from 2005 to 2007. He then worked on the November 2007 Australian Labor Party federal election campaign. From 2007 to 2010 he was special adviser to two Cabinet Ministers in Gordon Brown's Labour Government: first to Des Browne, Secretary of State for Scotland and Secretary of State for Defence, and then to Jim Murphy MP, the Secretary of State for Scotland from 2008 until May 2010. From June 2010 to October 2011, he was a columnist at The Scotsman, and then director of communications for the Australian Labor prime minister, Julia Gillard, from September 2011 to June 2013. He was chief of staff to the 2014–2015 leader of the Scottish Labour Party, Jim Murphy, who resigned after the Labour Party lost all but one seat in Scotland, including Murphy's, in the 2015 general election.

== Early life ==
McTernan was born in London and grew up in Edinburgh, and attended Firrhill High School. He studied English at the University of Edinburgh.

== Political career ==
=== Blair and Scottish Labour ===
McTernan was political secretary and director of political operations at 10 Downing Street for Tony Blair from 2005 to 2007, where he provided political management and support for the development of the government's political strategy. In 2007, McTernan was seconded to the Scottish Labour Party to run its campaign for the May 2007 Scottish Parliament election.

During the 2006–07 police investigation into the Cash for Honours political scandal surrounding the Labour Party, McTernan was twice questioned, under caution, by the Metropolitan Police. No criminal charges were ever brought against McTernan or anybody else.

From 2007 to 2008 he was Special Adviser to Des Browne, Secretary of State for Scotland and Secretary of State for Defence. He was special adviser to Jim Murphy MP, the Secretary of State for Scotland from 2008 until 2010.

In January 2008, while McTernan was employed as a special adviser to the Secretary of State for Scotland, it emerged that in 2002 McTernan had branded Scotland as being "narrow" and "racist" during the period he worked for the Scottish Arts Council. In an email to the then Labour MSP Karen Gillon, who was about to make a trip to Sweden, McTernan wrote: "If you've not been to Sweden before, I think you'll really like it – it's the country Scotland would be if it wasn't narrow, Presbyterian, racist etc. etc. Social democracy in action." The email was obtained by the London Sunday Times under freedom of information legislation.

=== Work in Australia ===
In 2007 he worked on the November 2007 Australian Labor Party federal election campaign.

In September 2011, he was appointed communications director to the Australian prime minister, Julia Gillard. From February 2011 to October 2011, he was Thinker in Residence at the Government of South Australia.

During 2012–13, a political scandal erupted over his employment. Accusations were made that Gillard had not attempted to find a suitable Australian candidate for the director of communications post, but had flouted Australia's visa process to employ John McTernan, a British citizen, on a 457 visa – a foreign workers scheme which is designed for employers who cannot find local candidates to fill jobs. When a reporter from Australia's ABC News asked McTernan if he was working in Australia on a 457 visa, he replied "hardly fucking relevant".

=== Later career ===
In January 2015, McTernan was appointed chief of staff to Jim Murphy, then Scottish Labour leader, ahead of the 2015 general election, and oversaw media and policy in this role.

McTernan strongly opposed Jeremy Corbyn, the eventual winner, in the 2015 Labour leadership election, describing Corbyn's popularity as a "strange psychological emotional spasm". He said: "I can't see any case for letting him have two minutes in office, let alone two years in office because I think the damage that will be done to the Labour party in that period makes it incredibly hard to recover". The MPs who nominated Corbyn were "moronic", according to McTernan.

Following the 2016 revelations about David Cameron's earlier offshore earnings, and Corbyn's call for an investigation, McTernan argued in his Daily Telegraph column that tax avoidance is an expression of basic British freedoms.

In February 2016 McTernan joined the policy and media advice agency Westminster Policy Institute as an associate. He continued to write a regular column for The Daily Telegraph.

In November 2016, McTernan bet blogger Stuart Campbell $100 on a Clinton victory in the 2016 US presidential election, which he lost. Campbell has said that McTernan failed to honour the bet, and Campbell has taken court action against him.

In August 2017 McTernan joined the Labour Party left-wing pressure group Momentum, set up to support Jeremy Corbyn's leadership. McTernan had previously been a critic of Momentum and of Corbyn.

In October 2018, John McTernan was asked if he still defended the 2003 invasion of Iraq. He responded in the affirmative: "Any war against a fascist dictator is a good war." He went on to compare the war in Iraq to the Falklands War, the Second World War and the Spanish Civil War. "As my Kurdish friends say 'We never ask why did you invade, we ask why did you take so long?'," said McTernan. He went on to argue that Brexit was the result of a lack of a humanitarian intervention in the Syrian civil war because it would have prevented the refugee crisis.

In April 2020, McTernan wrote an article in The Critic advising Keir Starmer to purge the "Corbynistas" from the Labour party, saying that "there's no problem with a witch-hunt when there really are witches to hunt". In June 2024, however, he wrote another article, in which he said, "the Left is a vital part of our movement – our broad church", and asked rhetorically, "Where would New Labour have been without Marxism Today?"

In November 2024, Prime Minister Keir Starmer distanced himself from McTernan following comments he made on GB News while discussing inheritance tax rises in the budget which would affect farmers. He said that family farming is "an industry we can do without" and suggested that if farmers protested "we can do to them what Margaret Thatcher did to the miners".

Government offices
Preceded by Pat McFadden	Political Secretary to the Prime Minister; 2005–2007	Succeeded by Joe Irvin
