= Leader of the Conservative Party in the House of Lords =

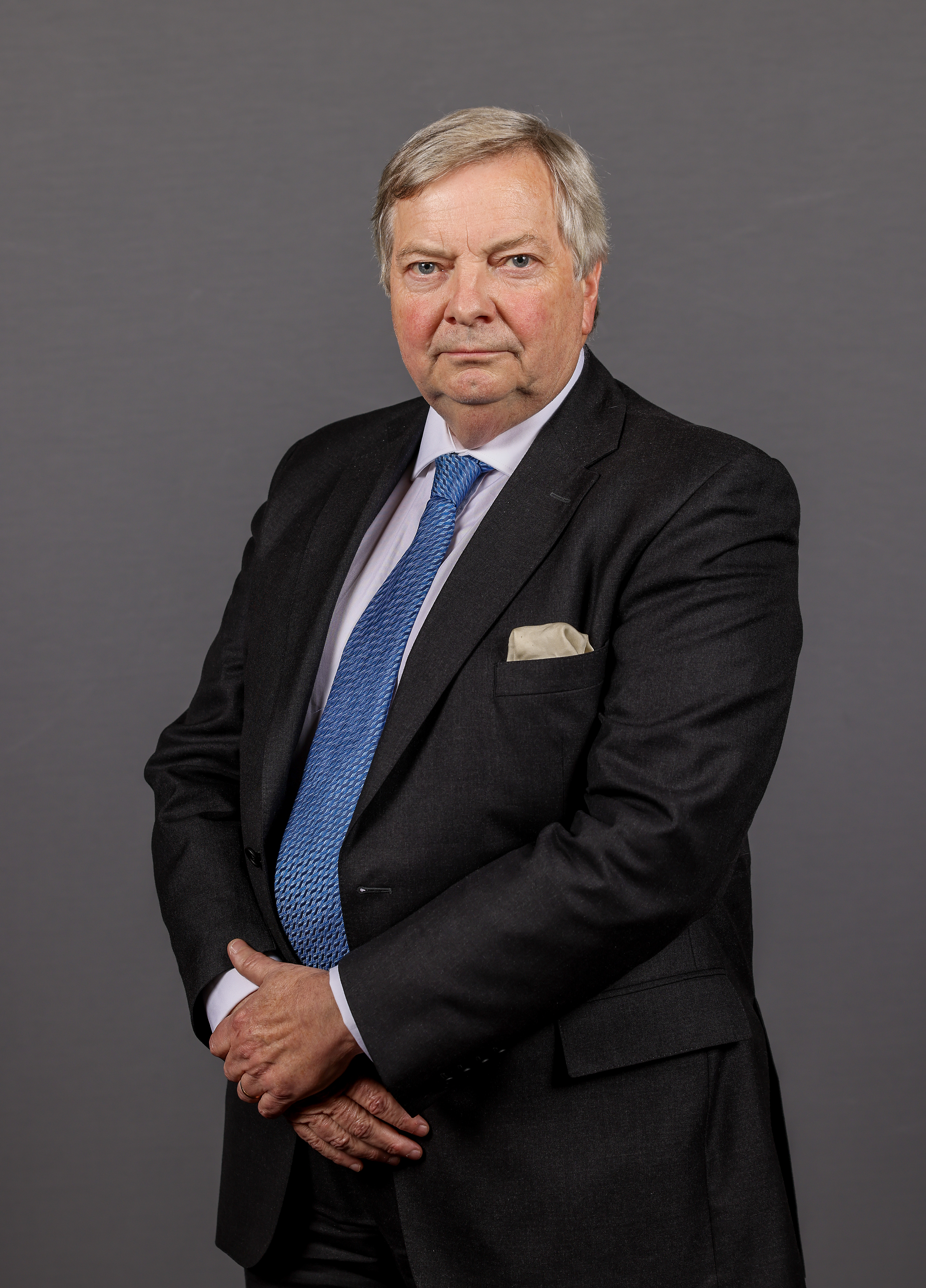
- Incumbent; The Lord True since 6 September 2022
- Inaugural holder: The Duke of Wellington
- Formation: 1834

The Leader of the Conservative Party in the House of Lords is the parliamentary chairperson of the Conservative Party of the House of Lords, the upper house of the Parliament of the United Kingdom. The Conservative Party peers elect the Leader of the Conservative Party in the House of Lords.

When the Conservative Party is the main party of opposition in the House of Commons, this post also acts as Shadow Leader of the House of Lords.

== List of Conservative Leaders in the House of Lords ==
Those asterisked were considered the overall leader of the party.

Portrait	Leader	Term of office		LOTO	Other ministerial offices held as Leader of the House of Lords
	The Duke of Wellington	18 December 1834	1846	1835–1841	– Foreign Secretary (14 November 1834 – 18 April 1835)
	The Duke of Wellington	18 December 1834	1846	1835–1841	– Minister without Portfolio (3 September 1841 – 27 June 1846)
	The Lord Stanley of Bickerstaffe* (Note: The 14th Earl of Derby from 1851.)	1846	27 February 1868	1852–1858; 1859–1866	– Prime Minister (23 February 1852 – 17 December 1852)
	The Lord Stanley of Bickerstaffe*	1846	27 February 1868	1852–1858; 1859–1866	– Prime Minister (21 February 1858 – 11 June 1859)
	The Lord Stanley of Bickerstaffe*	1846	27 February 1868	1852–1858; 1859–1866	– Prime Minister (28 June 1866 – 25 February 1868)
	The Earl of Malmesbury	27 February 1868	1869	1868–1869	– Lord Keeper of the Privy Seal (6 July 1866 – 1 December 1868)
	The Lord Cairns	1869	26 February 1870	1869–1870	–
	The Duke of Richmond	26 February 1870	21 August 1876	1870–1874	– Lord President of the Council (21 February 1874 – 28 April 1880)
	The Earl of Beaconsfield*	21 August 1876	19 April 1881	1880–1881	– Prime Minister (20 February 1874 – 21 April 1880)
	The Earl of Beaconsfield*	21 August 1876	19 April 1881	1880–1881	– Lord Keeper of the Privy Seal (12 August 1876 – 4 February 1878)
	The Marquess of Salisbury*	9 May 1881	12 July 1902	1881–1885; 1886; 1892–1895	– Prime Minister (23 June 1885 – 28 January 1886)
	The Marquess of Salisbury*	9 May 1881	12 July 1902	1881–1885; 1886; 1892–1895	– Foreign Secretary (24 June 1885 – 6 February 1886)
	The Marquess of Salisbury*	9 May 1881	12 July 1902	1881–1885; 1886; 1892–1895	– Prime Minister (25 July 1886 – 11 August 1892)
	The Marquess of Salisbury*	9 May 1881	12 July 1902	1881–1885; 1886; 1892–1895	– Foreign Secretary (14 January 1887 – 11 August 1892)
	The Marquess of Salisbury*	9 May 1881	12 July 1902	1881–1885; 1886; 1892–1895	– Prime Minister (25 June 1895 – 11 July 1902)
	The Marquess of Salisbury*	9 May 1881	12 July 1902	1881–1885; 1886; 1892–1895	– Foreign Secretary (29 June 1895 – 12 November 1900)
	The Marquess of Salisbury*	9 May 1881	12 July 1902	1881–1885; 1886; 1892–1895	– Lord Keeper of the Privy Seal (12 November 1900 – 11 July 1902)
	The Duke of Devonshire	12 July 1902	10 October 1903		– Lord President of the Council (29 June 1895 – 19 October 1903)
	The Duke of Devonshire	12 July 1902	10 October 1903		– President of the Board of Education (3 March 1900 – 8 August 1902)
	The Marquess of Lansdowne	10 October 1903	10 December 1916	1905–1915	– Foreign Secretary (12 November 1900 – 4 December 1905)
	The Marquess of Lansdowne	10 October 1903	10 December 1916	1905–1915	– Minister without Portfolio (25 May 1915 – 10 December 1916)
	The Earl Curzon of Kedleston (Note: The 1st Marquess Curzon of Kedleston from 1921.)	10 December 1916	20 March 1925	1924	– President of the Air Board (15 May 1916 – 3 January 1917)
	The Earl Curzon of Kedleston	10 December 1916	20 March 1925	1924	– Lord President of the Council (10 December 1916 – 23 October 1919)
	The Earl Curzon of Kedleston	10 December 1916	20 March 1925	1924	– Foreign Secretary (23 October 1919 – 22 January 1924)
	The Earl Curzon of Kedleston	10 December 1916	20 March 1925	1924	– Lord President of the Council (3 November 1924 – 20 March 1925)
	The Marquess of Salisbury	27 April 1925	17 June 1931	1929–1931	– Lord Keeper of the Privy Seal (6 November 1924 – 4 June 1929)
	The Viscount Hailsham	17 June 1931	7 June 1935	1931	– War Secretary (5 November 1931 – 7 June 1935)
	The Marquess of Londonderry	7 June 1935	22 November 1935		– Lord Keeper of the Privy Seal
	The Viscount Halifax	22 November 1935	21 February 1938		– Lord Keeper of the Privy Seal (22 November 1935 – 28 May 1937)
	The Viscount Halifax	22 November 1935	21 February 1938		– Lord President of the Council (28 May 1937 – 9 March 1938)
	The Earl Stanhope	21 February 1938	14 May 1940		– President of the Board of Education (28 May 1937 – 27 October 1938)
	The Earl Stanhope	21 February 1938	14 May 1940		– First Lord of the Admiralty (27 October 1938 – 3 September 1939)
	The Earl Stanhope	21 February 1938	14 May 1940		– Lord President of the Council (3 September 1939 – 10 May 1940)
	The Viscount Caldecote	14 May 1940	3 October 1940		– Dominions Secretary
	The Viscount Halifax	3 October 1940	22 December 1940		– Foreign Secretary (21 February 1938 – 22 December 1940)
	The Lord Lloyd	22 December 1940	8 February 1941		– Colonial Secretary (12 May 1940 – 4 February 1941)
	The Lord Moyne	8 February 1941	22 February 1942		– Colonial Secretary
	Viscount Cranborne (Note: The 5th Marquess of Salisbury from 1947.)	21 February 1942	29 March 1957	1945–1951	– Lord Keeper of the Privy Seal (21 February 1942 – 24 September 1943)
	Viscount Cranborne	21 February 1942	29 March 1957	1945–1951	– Colonial Secretary (21 February 1942 – 22 November 1942)
	Viscount Cranborne	21 February 1942	29 March 1957	1945–1951	– Dominions Secretary (24 September 1943 – 26 July 1945)
	Viscount Cranborne	21 February 1942	29 March 1957	1945–1951	– Lord Keeper of the Privy Seal (28 October 1951 – 7 May 1952)
	Viscount Cranborne	21 February 1942	29 March 1957	1945–1951	– Commonwealth Relations Secretary (12 March 1952 – 24 November 1952)
	Viscount Cranborne	21 February 1942	29 March 1957	1945–1951	– Lord President of the Council (25 November 1952 – 29 March 1957)
	The Earl of Home	29 March 1957	27 July 1960		– Lord President of the Council (29 March 1957 – 17 September 1957)
	The Earl of Home	29 March 1957	27 July 1960		– Commonwealth Relations Secretary (7 April 1955 – 27 July 1960)
	The Earl of Home	29 March 1957	27 July 1960		– Lord President of the Council (14 October 1959 – 27 July 1960)
	The Viscount Hailsham	27 July 1960	20 October 1963		– Lord President of the Council (27 July 1960 – 16 October 1964)
	The Viscount Hailsham	27 July 1960	20 October 1963		– Minister for Science (14 October 1959 – 31 March 1964)
	The Lord Carrington	20 October 1963	20 June 1970	1964–1970	– Minister without Portfolio (20 October 1963 – 16 October 1964)
	The Earl Jellicoe	20 June 1970	23 May 1973		– Lord Keeper of the Privy Seal
	The Lord Windlesham	23 May 1973	4 March 1974		– Lord Keeper of the Privy Seal
	The Lord Carrington	4 March 1974	4 May 1979	1974–1979	–
	The Lord Soames	5 May 1979	14 September 1981		– Lord President of the Council
	The Baroness Young	14 September 1981	11 June 1983		– Chancellor of the Duchy of Lancaster (14 September 1981 – 7 April 1982)
	The Baroness Young	14 September 1981	11 June 1983		– Lord Keeper of the Privy Seal (7 April 1982 – 11 June 1983)
	The Viscount Whitelaw	11 June 1983	10 January 1988		– Lord President of the Council
	The Lord Belstead	10 January 1988	28 November 1990		– Lord Keeper of the Privy Seal
	The Lord Waddington	28 November 1990	11 April 1992		– Lord Keeper of the Privy Seal
	The Lord Wakeham	11 April 1992	20 July 1994		– Lord Keeper of the Privy Seal
	Viscount Cranborne (Note: The 7th Marquess of Salisbury from 2003.)	20 July 1994	3 December 1998	1997–1998	– Lord Keeper of the Privy Seal (20 July 1994 – 2 May 1997)
	The Lord Strathclyde	3 December 1998	7 January 2013	1998–2010	– Chancellor of the Duchy of Lancaster (12 May 2010 – 7 January 2013)
	The Lord Hill of Oareford	7 January 2013	15 July 2014		– Chancellor of the Duchy of Lancaster
	The Baroness Stowell of Beeston	15 July 2014	14 July 2016		– Lord Keeper of the Privy Seal
	The Baroness Evans of Bowes Park	14 July 2016	6 September 2022		– Lord Keeper of the Privy Seal
	The Lord True	6 September 2022	Incumbent	2024–	– Lord Keeper of the Privy Seal (6 September 2022 – 5 July 2024)

== See also ==
- Leader of the Conservative Party (UK)
