= Stephen Gilbert, Baron Gilbert of Panteg =

British Conservative politician

The Right Honourable The Lord Gilbert of Panteg
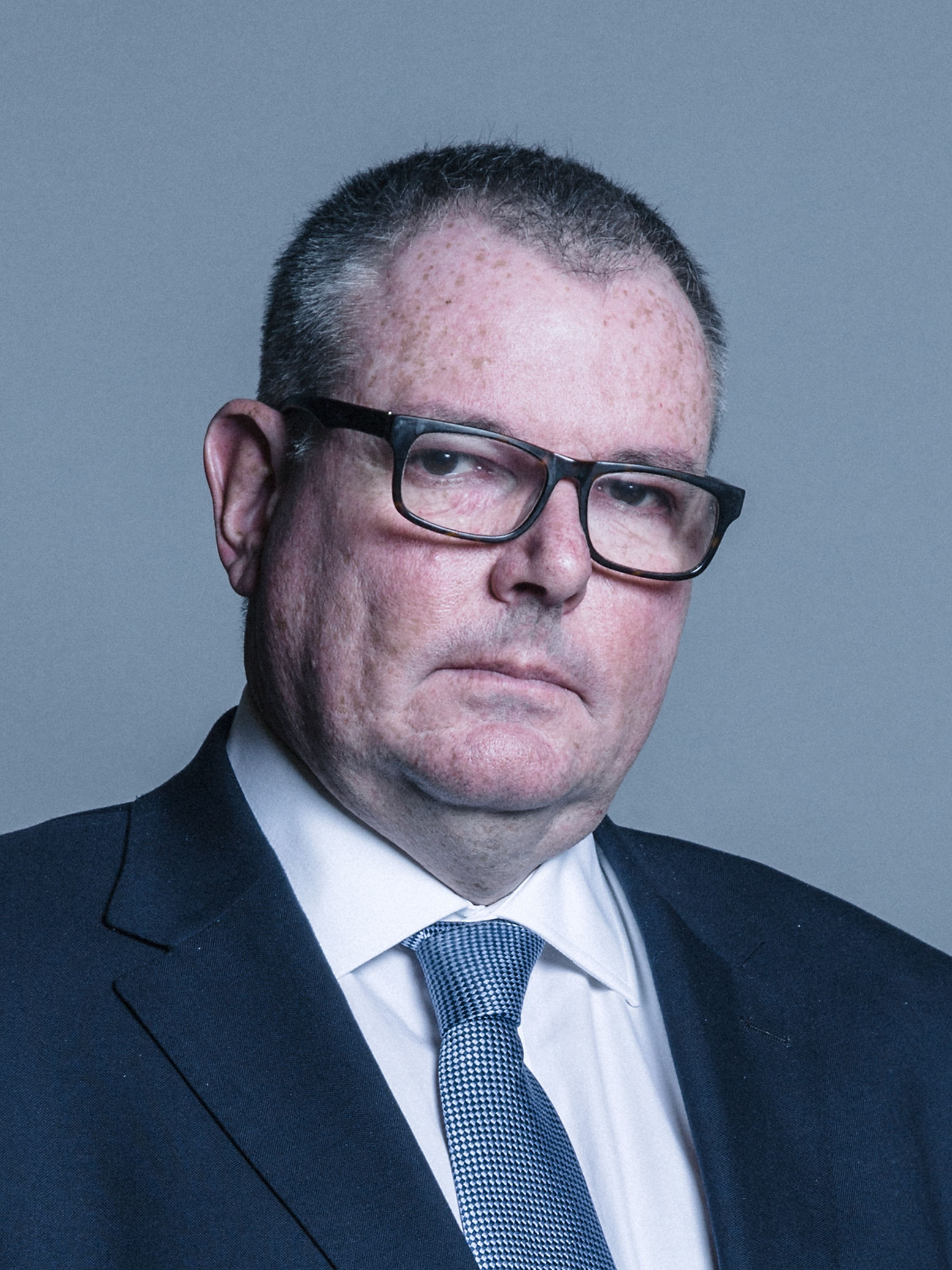
- Lord Gilbert of Panteg

Chair of the Communications and Digital Committee
- In office 6 November 2017 – 19 January 2022
- Preceded by: The Lord Henley
- Succeeded by: The Baroness Stowell of Beeston

Member of the House of Lords
- Lord Temporal
- Life peerage 30 September 2015

Political Secretary to the Prime Minister of the United Kingdom
- In office 2010–2015
- Prime Minister: David Cameron
- Preceded by: Joe Irvin
- Succeeded by: Laurence Mann

Personal details
- Born: 24 July 1963 (age 63)
- Party: Conservative

Stephen Gilbert, Baron Gilbert of Panteg (born 24 July 1963) is a British Conservative politician and member of the House of Lords.

== Early life ==
Gilbert was brought up in Pontypool and became active in politics in the town. After attending West Monmouth School he worked in Cwmbran and soon became involved in local politics.

He said in an interview: "I saw in Pontypool that politics was about public service. It was a Labour town but with an active Conservative Party and thriving community organisations.

"I saw that so often the same people who were involved in the stuffing of envelopes for political parties one day would be at the counter of the charity shop the next. I felt then, as I do now, that getting involved in and working for any political party and fighting for your beliefs is valuable, decent and honourable."

== Career ==
Gilbert first came into the Conservative Party with the old cadre of Tory officials, under the doyenne of Conservative elections Sir Tony Garrett, who headed the Conservative Party's national network of organizers on the ground in the 1990s. Jo-Anne Nadler, a Conservative Party biographer, described Gilbert as "unquestionably the most long-serving and experienced member of the in-house campaign team.".

As a young Tory official in 1997 Gilbert was reportedly one of the few people who realised the Conservative Party (UK) was going to lose by a landslide to Tony Blair – but his warnings and advice to focus on ‘safe’ Tory seats, rather than marginals, were ignored.

He served as deputy chairman of the Conservative Party until 2015. He decided to step down in November 2016, when he took up a part-time position at Populus, the official polling company for the main campaign to keep Britain in the EU, a move that is said to have infuriated Tory Eurosceptics. He resigned from his position, citing his "respect" for the party. Gilbert had also served as political secretary to David Cameron during his premiership, where he acted as the link between No. 10 and the Conservative Party.

Having played a key role in the 2015 general election, Cameron nominated him to the House of Lords, where he was created a life peer on 30 September 2015, taking the title Baron Gilbert of Panteg, of Panteg in the County of Monmouthshire.

After the Brexit referendum in 2016, he joined a lobbying firm, but was soon brought back into CCHQ by Theresa May to help during the election campaign.

== 2025 ==
The Leader of the Conservative Party, Kemi Badenoch, appointed Gilbert as a senior political adviser to her official office.

== Personal life ==
Gilbert is an honorary member of the Carlton Club. He is sole director of Stephen Gilbert Consulting.

Gilbert has never married.

Orders of precedence in the United Kingdom
Preceded by The Lord Smith of Hindhead	Gentlemen; Lord Gilbert of Panteg	Followed by The Lord Arbuthnot of Edrom
Government offices
Preceded by Joe Irvin	Political Secretary to the Prime Minister; 2010–2015	Succeeded by Laurence Mann
