= Political Secretary to the Prime Minister of the United Kingdom =

Senior official in the United Kingdom

Political Secretary to the Prime Minister
- Royal Arms as used by His Majesty's Government
- Incumbent; Hayden Munro since 20 July 2026
- Prime Minister's Office
- Appointer: Prime minister
- Formation: 1964
- First holder: Marcia Williams
- Website: 10 Downing Street

The political secretary to the prime minister of the United Kingdom is a senior official in the United Kingdom Civil Service who advises the prime minister. Established by Harold Wilson, but continued by subsequent prime ministers, the political secretary was originally not a civil servant, but was later incorporated into the Civil Service. The role was not in use between July 2024 and July 2026. In September 2025, the role of Chief Secretary to the Prime Minister was established, which partly covers this role alongside duties of the Chancellor of the Duchy of Lancaster.

== List of political secretaries to the prime minister of the United Kingdom ==
Political secretary	Years	Prime Minister
Marcia Williams	1964–1970	Harold Wilson
Douglas Hurd	1970–1974	Edward Heath
Marcia Williams	1974–1976	Harold Wilson
Tom McNally	1976–1979	James Callaghan
Richard Ryder	1979–1981	Margaret Thatcher
Derek Howe	1981–1983	Margaret Thatcher
Stephen Sherbourne	1983–1988	Margaret Thatcher
John Whittingdale	1988–1990	Margaret Thatcher
Judith Chaplin	1990–1992	John Major
Jonathan Hill	1992–1994	John Major
Howell James	1994–1997	John Major
Sally Morgan	1997–2001	Tony Blair
Robert Hill	2001–2002	Tony Blair
Pat McFadden	2002–2005	Tony Blair
John McTernan	2005–2007	Tony Blair
Joe Irvin	2007–2010	Gordon Brown
Stephen Gilbert	2010–2015	David Cameron
Laurence Mann	2015–2016	David Cameron
Stephen Parkinson	2016–2019	Theresa May
Danny Kruger	2019–2019	Boris Johnson
Benjamin Gascoigne	2019–2021	Boris Johnson
Declan Lyons	2021–2022	Boris Johnson
Sophie Jarvis	2022	Liz Truss
James Forsyth	2022–2024	Rishi Sunak
Hayden Munro	2026–present	Andy Burnham

== See also ==
- Politics of the United Kingdom
- Secretary (title)
