= Philip Smith, Baron Smith of Hindhead =

British politician

The Right Honourable The Lord Smith of Hindhead CBE
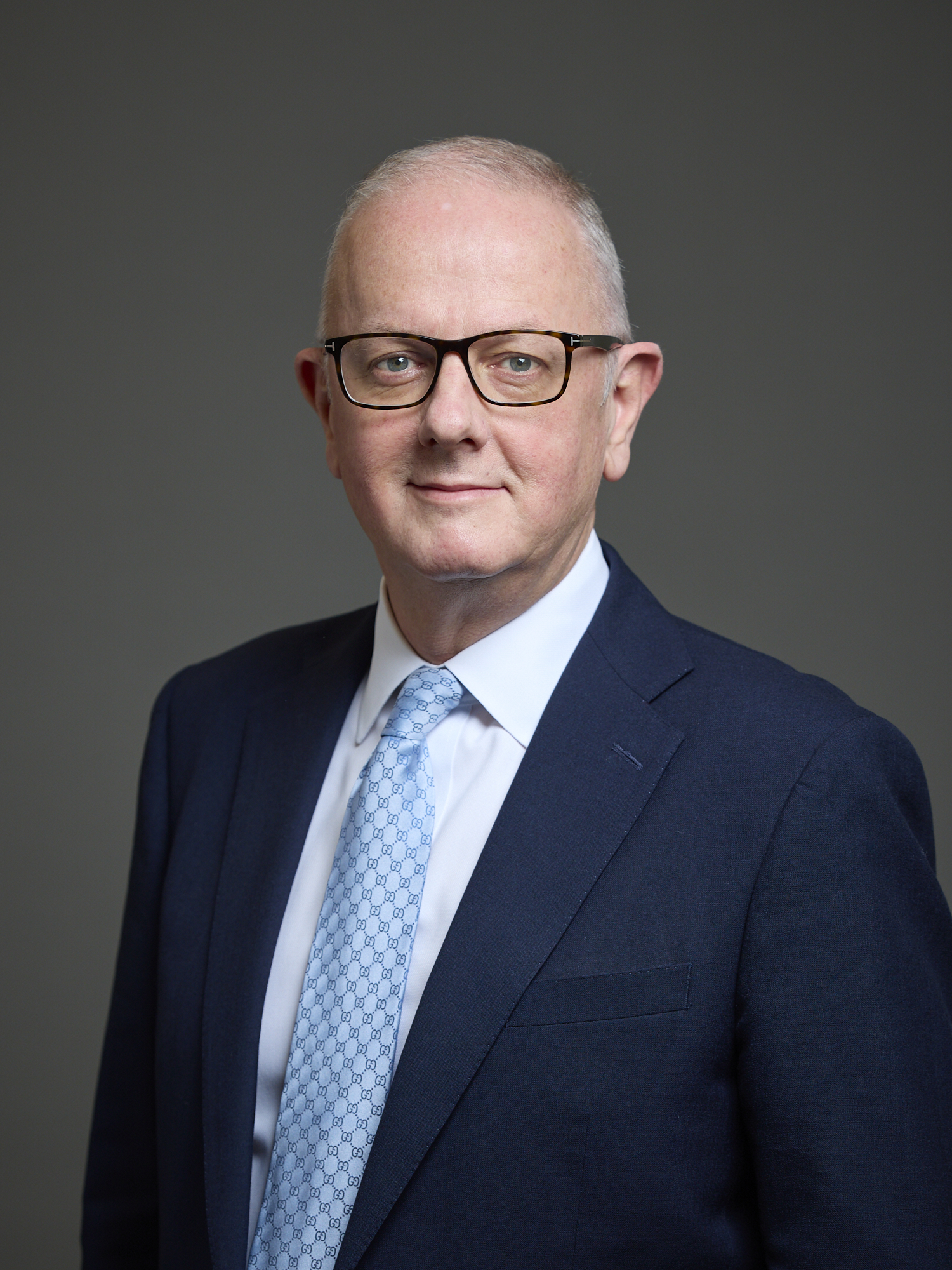
- Official portrait, 2026

Member of the House of Lords
- Lord Temporal
- Life peerage 29 September 2015

Personal details
- Born: Philip Roland Smith; 16 February 1966 (age 60)
- Party: Conservative

Philip Roland Smith, Baron Smith of Hindhead, CBE (born 16 February 1966) is a British Conservative Party politician and member of the House of Lords. He is the Chairman of the Association of Conservative Clubs.

== Honours ==
Smith was appointed a Commander of the Order of the British Empire (CBE) in the 2013 New Year Honours.

He was created a life peer on 29 September 2015, gazetted as Baron Smith of Hindhead, of Hindhead in the County of Surrey.

Orders of precedence in the United Kingdom
Preceded by The Lord Young of Cookham	Gentlemen; Baron Smith of Hindhead	Followed by The Lord Gilbert of Panteg
