= Natalie Evans, Baroness Evans of Bowes Park =

British politician (born 1975)

The Right Honourable The Baroness Evans of Bowes Park PC
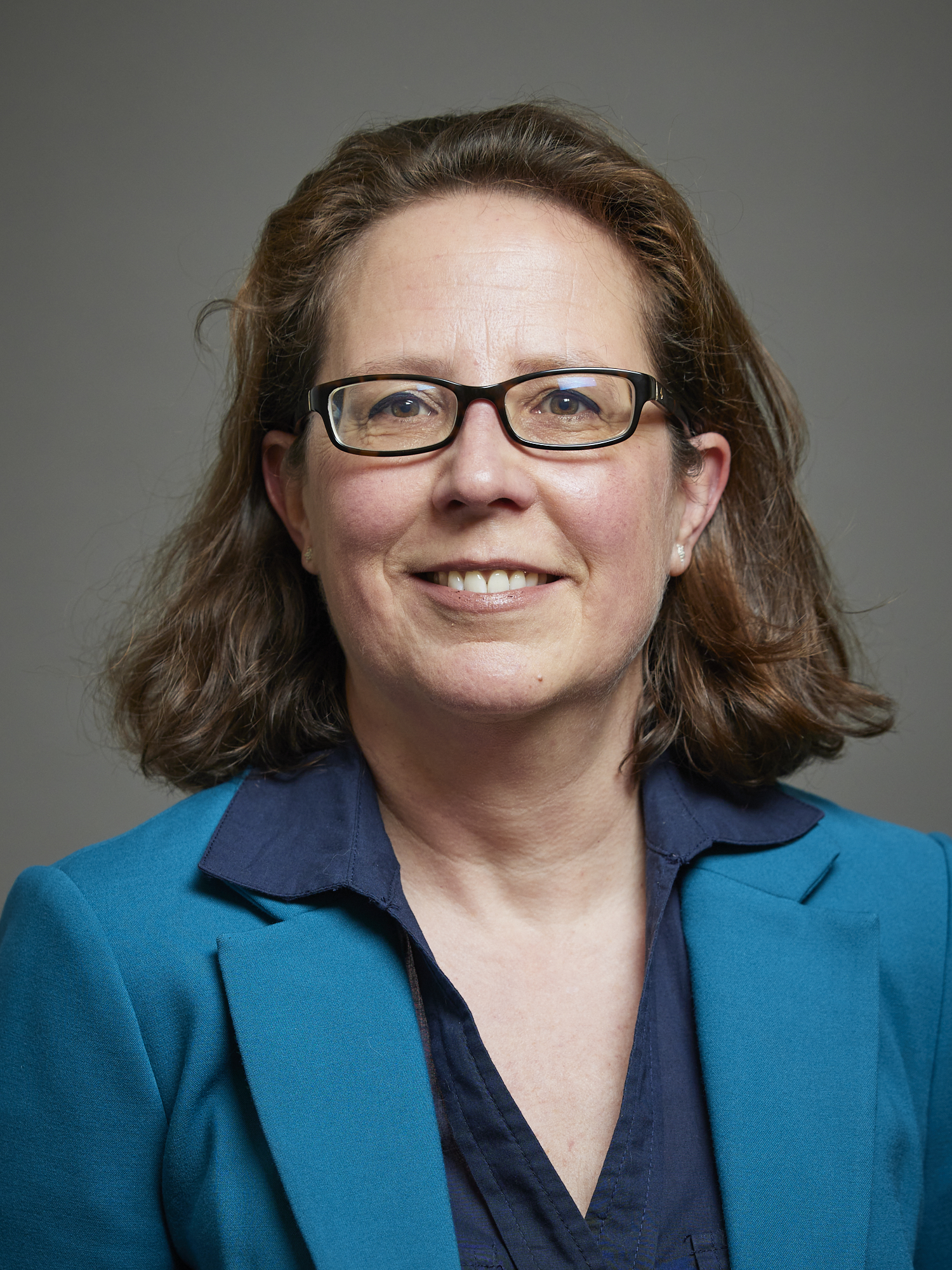
- Official portrait, 2023

Leader of the House of Lords Lord Keeper of the Privy Seal
- In office 14 July 2016 – 6 September 2022
- Prime Minister: Theresa May; Boris Johnson
- Preceded by: The Baroness Stowell of Beeston
- Succeeded by: The Lord True

Baroness-in-Waiting Government Whip
- In office 8 May 2015 – 13 July 2016
- Prime Minister: David Cameron
- Preceded by: The Baroness Jolly
- Succeeded by: The Baroness Goldie

Member of the House of Lords
- Lord Temporal
- Life peerage 12 September 2014

Personal details
- Born: Natalie Jessica Evans; 29 November 1975 (age 50)
- Party: Conservative
- Spouse: James Wild (m. 2010)
- Education: New Hall, Cambridge

Natalie Jessica Evans, Baroness Evans of Bowes Park (born 29 November 1975), is a British politician and member of the House of Lords. A member of the Conservative Party, she was made a life peer in 2014 and from 2016 to 2022 was Leader of the House of Lords. She was the first Leader of the House of Lords to serve under two different prime ministers since Lord Shepherd in 1974, and the longest serving Lords leader since 1951.

== Early life and education ==
Evans was born on 29 November 1975. She was educated at Rockport School in County Down, The Henrietta Barnett School and at New Hall, Cambridge, where she studied social and political sciences and graduated in 1998.

== Career ==
Evans worked as a researcher for the House of Commons and then for the Social Market Foundation, a public policy think tank which aims to "champion ideas that marry a pro-market orientation with concern for social justice". She moved to the Conservative Research Department in 1999, eventually becoming its deputy director. In 2002, she was appointed head of policy at the Investor Relations Society "with a remit to help the Society play a leading role in influencing UK legislation, in particular the Financial Services Authority's review of the listing rules and regulations covering analyst research." She later became its general manager. In 2004, she became head of health and protection at the Association of British Insurers (2004–2006), and then worked as head of policy at the British Chambers of Commerce (2006–2008).

In 2008, Evans became deputy director at Policy Exchange, a centre-right think tank. In May 2010, she stood for election to the London Borough of Haringey as a Conservative Party candidate to be one of three councillors in the Bounds Green ward; she achieved 647 votes and was not elected. On 5 November 2010, as deputy director at Policy Exchange, she introduced Home Secretary Theresa May at a speech about immigration hosted by the think tank.

In 2011, Evans left Policy Exchange to become chief operating officer at the New Schools Network. She was then its director from January 2013 until May 2015. The New Schools Network is a registered charity, and supports groups who wish to set up free schools.

=== House of Lords ===
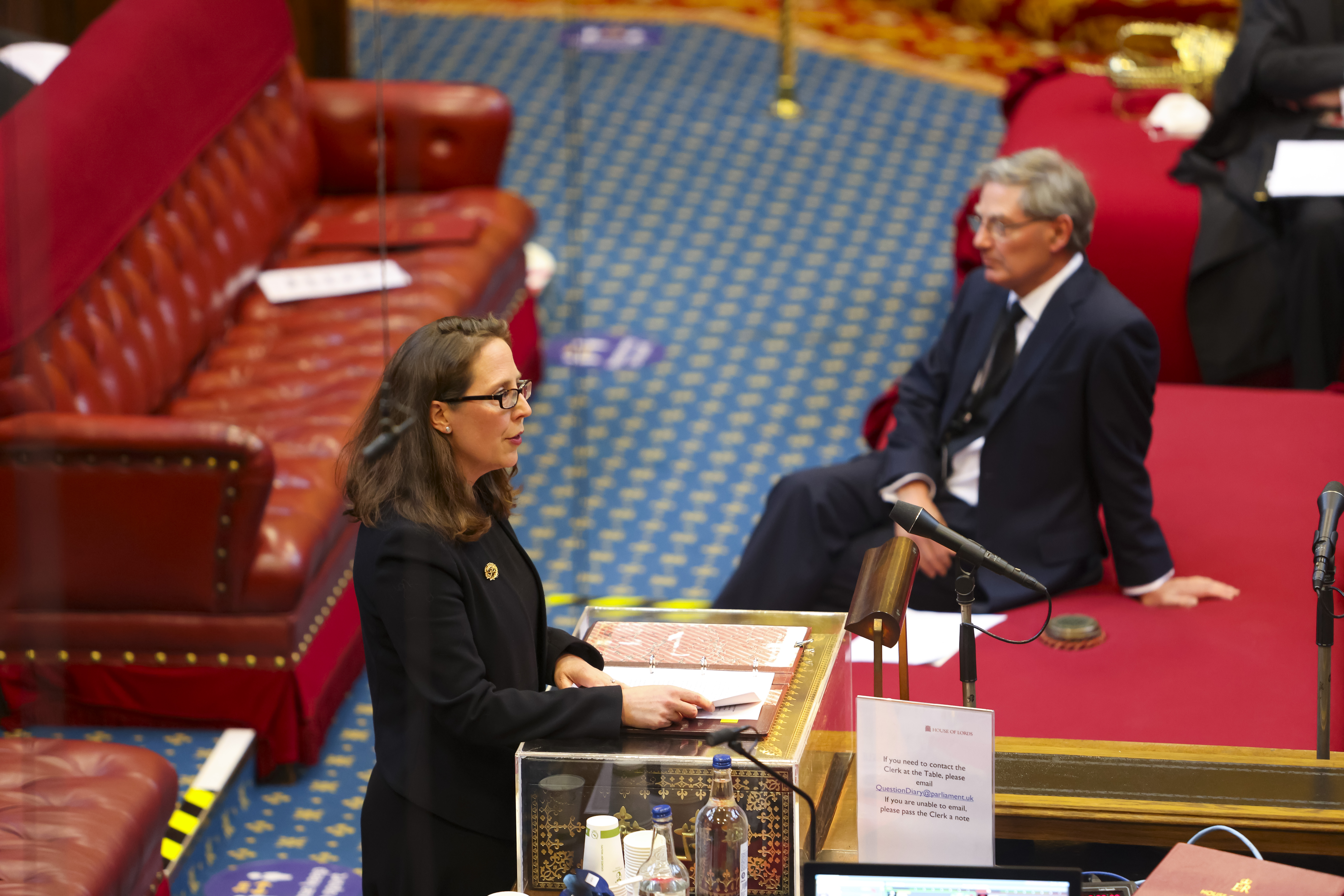
Evans at the Lords' dispatch box in 2021

She was made life peer as Baroness Evans of Bowes Park, of Bowes Park which borders the London Boroughs of Enfield and Haringey, on 12 September 2014. Baroness Evans was formally introduced to the House of Lords along with Lord Cashman on 28 October 2014. She was, at the time, the youngest female peer.

Evans served as a government whip in the House of Lords during the 2015 government, and spoke briefly in January 2016 about how "education must be at the heart of our prison system if we are to rehabilitate effectively". On 14 July 2016 Baroness Evans was appointed to the post of Leader of the House of Lords by then prime minister, Theresa May. She remained in that office when Boris Johnson became Prime Minister in July 2019.

== Personal life ==
Her husband James Wild was employed as a Special Adviser by Sir Michael Fallon MP, when he served as Secretary of State for Defence. He was elected the MP for North West Norfolk at the 2019 general election.

Political offices
Preceded by The Baroness Stowell of Beeston	Leader of the House of Lords; 2016–2022	Succeeded by The Lord True
Preceded by The Baroness Stowell of Beeston	Lord Privy Seal; 2016–2022	Succeeded by The Lord True
Party political offices
Preceded by The Baroness Stowell of Beeston	Leader of the Conservative Party in the House of Lords; 2016–2022	Succeeded by The Lord True
Order of precedence in England and Wales
Preceded by Baroness Smith of Newnham	Ladies	Succeeded by Baroness Harding of Winscombe
