= Council for Voluntary Service =

Type of charity in England

Council for Voluntary Service (CVS) is a type of organisation in England - "the place at which local voluntary and community organisations speak to each other". They offer a wide variety of services and support for other local organisations, for example training, or advice on funding.

CVSs are also involved in advocacy for the organisations they represent, and aid in communication between the local voluntary and community sector and the statutory sector. They will typically provide fora for organisations to meet, often a Community empowerment network, and will interact with, or have a seat on, the local strategic partnership. They may also advocate on behalf of the organisations they represent on a one to one basis.

A CVS may or may not incorporate the local Volunteer Centre.

CVS are bought together nationally by NAVCA, the National Association for Voluntary and Community Action

Each county in Wales has a County Voluntary Council rather than a CVS.

== See also ==
- National Council for Voluntary Organisations (England)
- Scottish Council for Voluntary Organisations (Scotland)
- Northern Ireland Council for Voluntary Action (Northern Ireland)
