= National Association for Voluntary and Community Action =

- Formation: 1991 as NACVS, renamed NAVCA in 2006
- Legal status: Charity
- Purpose: promotes the local voluntary and community sector nationally
- Location: The Circle, 33 Rockingham Lane, Sheffield, S1 4FW
- Region served: UK
- Chief Executive Officer: Maddy Desforges
- Website: www.navca.org.uk

NAVCA (the National Association for Voluntary and Community Action) is the national membership body for local support and development organisations in England. It is a registered charity (1001635), based in Sheffield, and was previously called the National Association of Councils for Voluntary Service (NACVS).

== History ==
The Councils for Voluntary Service National Association was a project of NCVO. In 1991, this project became independent and was named the National Association of Councils for Voluntary Service (NACVS). In June 2006, NACVS was renamed the National Association for Voluntary and Community Action (NAVCA). Previous chief executives have been Neil Cleeveley, Joe Irvin, Kevin Curley and Jane Ide. Its current CEO is Maddy Desforges.

== Purpose ==
NAVCA's stated purpose is to promote the local voluntary and community sector nationally. It provides members with information, advice, networking and learning opportunities, support and development services and in turn it draws on its members' experience to influence government and contribute to national policy. Local support and development organisations are often known as Voluntary Action, Community Action or Council for Voluntary Service. These organisations support local charities, voluntary organisations and community groups by providing them with support, information and funding advice.

== Campaigns ==
NAVCA advocates social value, whereby public authorities have regard to economic, social and environmental well-being when commissioning goods and services. NAVCA supported Chris White MP's private members bill that incorporated social value in legislation through the Public Services (Social Value) Act 2012.

== Membership ==
NAVCA has a membership network of nearly 200 local sector support and development organisations in England. NAVCA members work with around 165,000 local charities and voluntary organisations to provide advice, support and services.
