= Sean Worth =

British lobbyist and political adviser

Sean Worth is a former political adviser and co-founder of the public relations firm WPI Strategy. Prior to setting up WPI Strategy, Worth was a Downing Street special adviser to Prime Minister David Cameron. He left Government in 2012 to set up the Better Public Services Project at the think tank Policy Exchange. Prior to working in Government, Worth was head of the Conservative Party's Policy Unit, and worked for the party through two general elections. The Guardian newspaper reported that, when leaving Downing Street, Worth was David Cameron's "special adviser on NHS privatisation" and began working for MHP Communications in October 2012.

In October 2013 he joined the lobbying firm Quiller Consultants. He left Quiller in July 2014 to launch the Westminster Policy Institute (WPI) described by a source to PR Week as "a cross between a think-tank and a research institute".

Nick Faith quit the think tank Policy Exchange to take an equal stake in WPI with Worth.
