= Tina Stowell, Baroness Stowell of Beeston =

British Conservative politician and life peer (born 1967)

The Right Honourable The Baroness Stowell of Beeston MBE PC
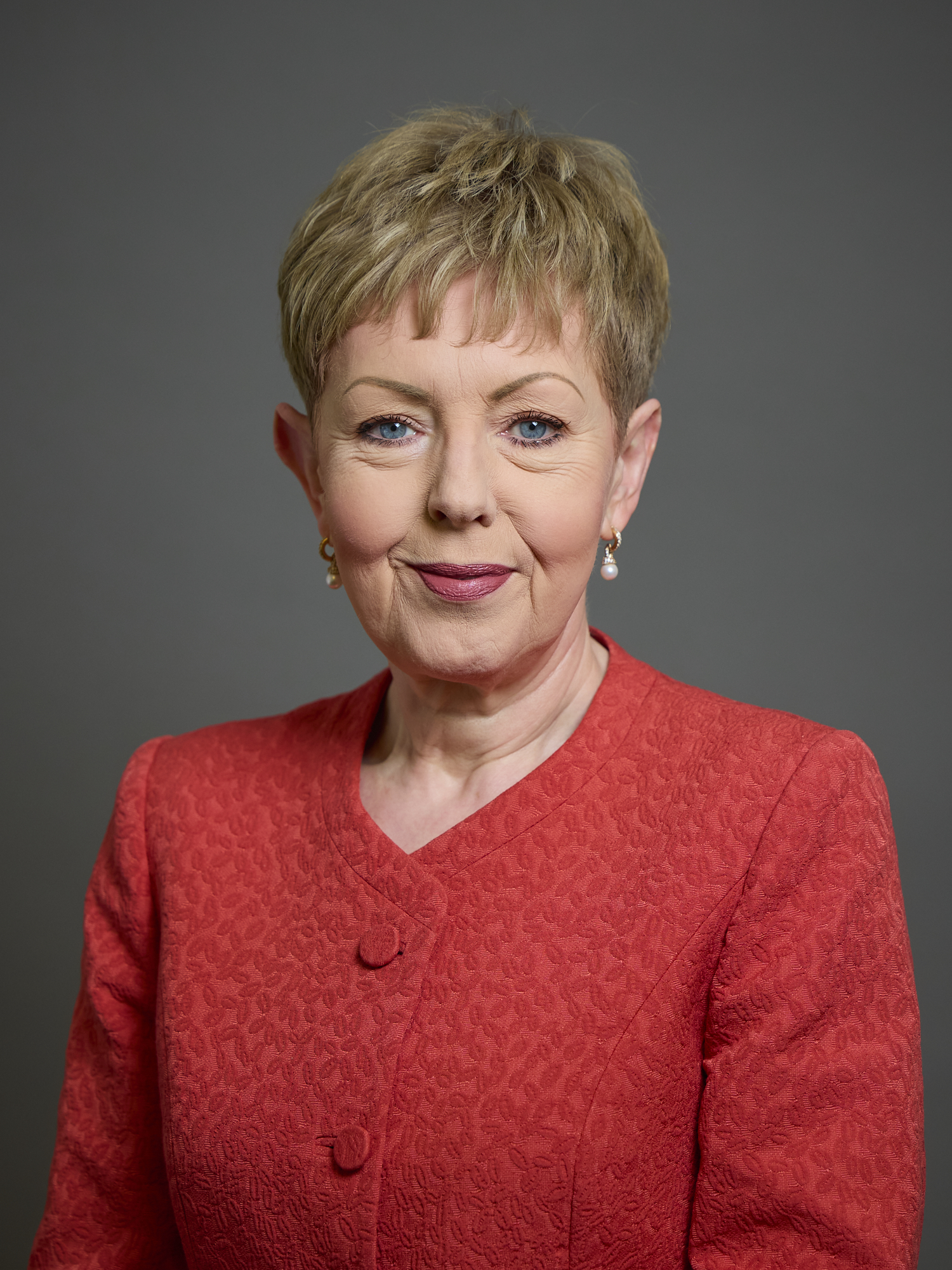
- Official portrait, 2025

Chair of the Communications and Digital Committee
- Incumbent
- Assumed office 19 January 2022
- Preceded by: The Lord Gilbert of Panteg

Chair of the Charity Commission
- In office 24 February 2018 – 23 February 2021
- Prime Minister: Theresa May; Boris Johnson
- Preceded by: William Shawcross
- Succeeded by: Ian Karet

Leader of the House of Lords Lord Keeper of the Privy Seal
- In office 15 July 2014 – 14 July 2016
- Prime Minister: David Cameron
- Preceded by: The Lord Hill of Oareford (Lords Leader); Andrew Lansley (Lord Privy Seal)
- Succeeded by: The Baroness Evans of Bowes Park

Parliamentary Under-Secretary of State for Communities and Local Government
- In office 7 October 2013 – 14 July 2014
- Prime Minister: David Cameron
- Preceded by: The Baroness Hanham
- Succeeded by: The Lord Ahmad of Wimbledon

Baroness-in-Waiting Government Whip
- In office 18 September 2011 – 7 October 2013
- Prime Minister: David Cameron
- Preceded by: The Lord Taylor of Holbeach
- Succeeded by: The Lord Bates

Member of the House of Lords
- Lord Temporal
- Life peerage 10 January 2011

Personal details
- Born: 2 July 1967 (age 59) Beeston, Nottinghamshire, England
- Party: Non-affiliated; Conservative
- Education: Broxtowe College

Tina Wendy Stowell, Baroness Stowell of Beeston, MBE PC (born 2 July 1967) is a British Conservative politician and member of the House of Lords.

Baroness Stowell served as Leader of the House of Lords and Lord Keeper of the Privy Seal under David Cameron. She was succeeded by the Baroness Evans of Bowes Park on 14 July 2016.

== Early life and education ==
Stowell grew up in Beeston, Nottinghamshire. Her father was a painter/decorator and her mother worked in a local factory. She attended Chilwell Comprehensive School, where she gained five O-levels, followed by Broxtowe College in Beeston.

== Career ==
After leaving college, Stowell worked at the Ministry of Defence between 1986 and 1988. She was then employed at the British Embassy in the United States until 1991, before transferring to the No. 10 Press Office, where she served under the then-Prime Minister John Major. In recognition of her performance in this position, she was appointed a Member of the Order of the British Empire (MBE) in the 1996 Birthday Honours.

Following the 1997 general election, Stowell worked at Conservative Party Headquarters during William Hague's tenure as party leader and was his Deputy Chief of Staff.

In November 2001, Stowell joined the BBC as deputy secretary. She became Head of Communications for the BBC Trust in 2003, in which capacity she worked for three successive chairmen (Gavyn Davies, Michael Grade, and Sir Michael Lyons). In September 2008 she became the BBC's Head of Corporate Affairs.

=== Peerage and Parliamentary career ===
In 2010, Stowell sought the Conservative nomination for the safe seat of Bromsgrove but lost to Sajid Javid. Labour MPs called for her to resign her BBC post to avoid a conflict of interest.

Stowell was created a Life Peer as Baroness Stowell of Beeston, of Beeston in the County of Nottinghamshire, on 10 January 2011. She was introduced to the House of Lords, where she sits on the Conservative benches, on 13 January 2011.

On 18 September 2011, Baroness Stowell was appointed a Baroness-in-Waiting to the Queen, following the promotion of the former Lord-in-Waiting Lord Taylor of Holbeach (who became a junior minister at the Department for Environment, Food and Rural Affairs).

In 2013, Baroness Stowell was responsible for steering the Marriage (Same Sex Couples) Bill for England and Wales through the House of Lords. She was subsequently, on 7 October 2013, promoted to the post of Parliamentary Under-Secretary at the Department for Communities and Local Government.

On 2 April 2014, she defended overseas property investors in London in a Parliamentary debate.

In a cabinet reshuffle in July 2014, Baroness Stowell was appointed Leader of the House of Lords and Lord Keeper of the Privy Seal. She also became a Privy Counsellor. In this capacity, though she was able to attend its meetings, she was not a full member of the Cabinet.

Following the 2015 general election, Baroness Stowell remained in her role and became a full member of the Cabinet. She was succeeded by the Rt. Hon. Baroness Evans of Bowes Park on 14 July 2016.

The Department for Digital, Culture, Media and Sport selected Stowell to be the new chair of the Charity Commission for England and Wales. However in 2018 the parliamentary Digital, Culture, Media and Sport Committee at their interview of Stowell unanimously refused to endorse the appointment due to "a complete lack of experience" and a lack of "any real insight, knowledge or vision".

In 2018, it was reported that the Charity Commission for England and Wales, of which Stowell is Chair, would question The Transformation Trust, a charity which Stowell was a trustee of, over staff payments.

Political offices
Preceded by The Lord Hill of Oareford	Leader of the House of Lords; 2014–2016	Succeeded by The Baroness Evans of Bowes Park
Preceded by Andrew Lansley	Lord Privy Seal; 2014–2016	Succeeded by The Baroness Evans of Bowes Park
Party political offices
Preceded by The Lord Hill of Oareford	Leader of the Conservative Party in the House of Lords; 2014–2016	Succeeded by The Baroness Evans of Bowes Park
