= Joe Irvin =

British politician

Joseph David Irvin OBE

Political Secretary to the Prime Minister of the United Kingdom
- In office 2007–2010
- Prime Minister: Gordon Brown
- Preceded by: John McTernan
- Succeeded by: Stephen Gilbert

Personal details
- Education: Birkbeck College, University of London

Joseph David Irvin OBE is an ex-charity leader who until 2020 was the chief executive of Living Streets, the UK charity that campaigns for pedestrians.

== Career ==
He started his career as policy officer for the Trades Union Congress before moving onto various roles including Director of Education and Research at the Transport and General Workers' Union. He has in the past served as Director of Parliamentary Affairs for the RSPB (Royal Society for the Protection of Birds) and Director of Public Affairs for BAA

In 1997 he moved into the political arena as special advisor to Deputy Prime Minister John Prescott and eventually went on to replace John McTernan as Political Secretary to Gordon Brown during his term as Prime Minister of the United Kingdom. After leaving politics in 2012 he became CEO of the National Association for Voluntary and Community Action.

Irvin was appointed Officer of the Order of the British Empire (OBE) in the 2020 New Year Honours for services to active travel and charities.

== Personal life ==
He is married to Diana Holland, Assistant General Secretary of Unite trade union and Treasurer of the Labour Party.

Government offices
Preceded by John McTernan	Political Secretary to the Prime Minister; 2007–2010	Succeeded by Stephen Gilbert
