= Stephen Parkinson, Baron Parkinson of Whitley Bay =

British Conservative politician and life peer (born 1983)

The Right Honourable The Lord Parkinson of Whitley Bay
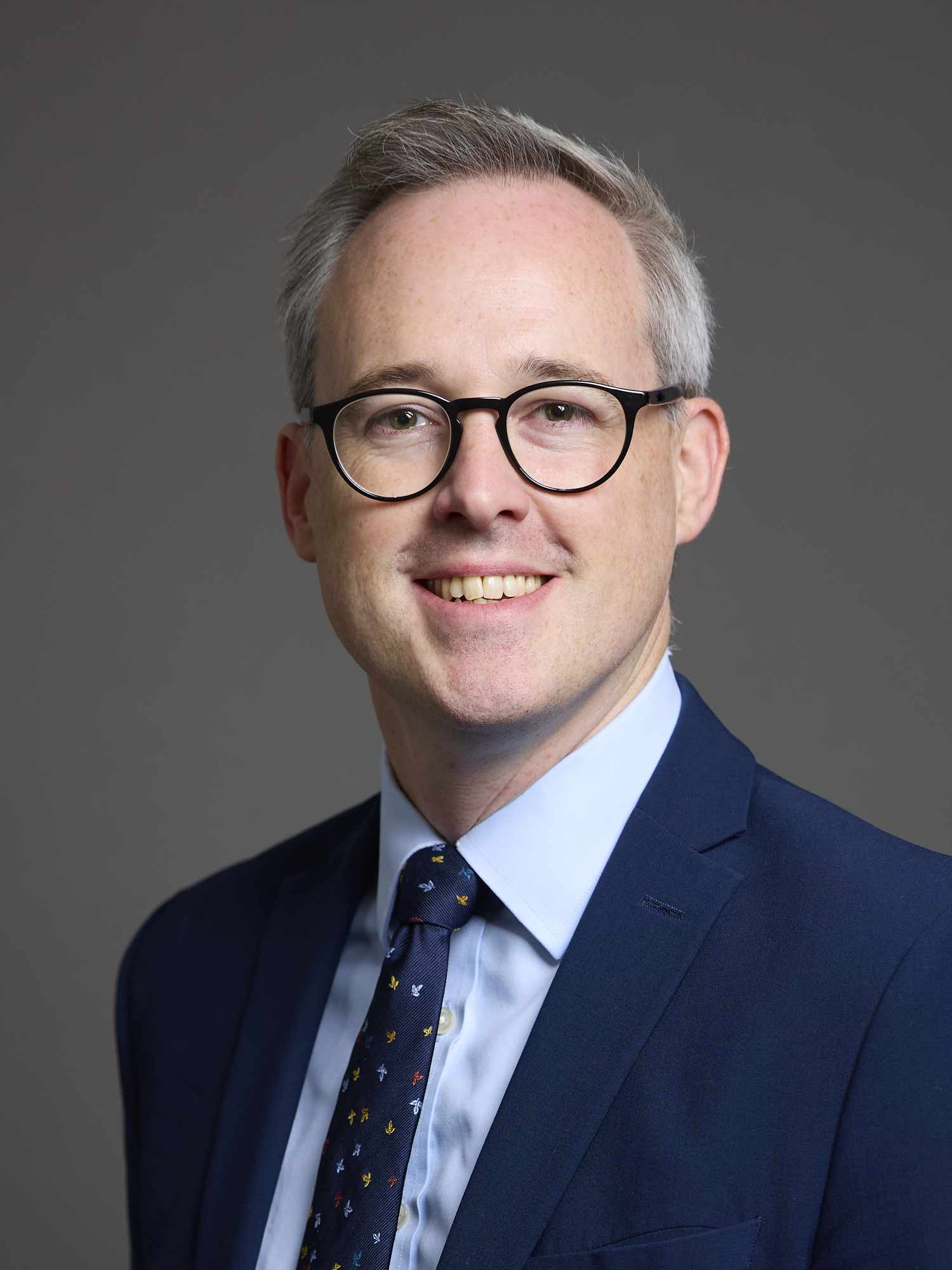
- Official portrait, 2024

Parliamentary Under-Secretary of State for Arts and Heritage
- In office 29 October 2022 – 5 July 2024
- Prime Minister: Rishi Sunak
- Preceded by: Stuart Andrew (Sport, Arts and Ceremonials); The Lord Kamall (Civil Society, Heritage, Tourism and Growth)
- Succeeded by: Chris Bryant

Parliamentary Under-Secretary of State for Arts
- In office 30 September 2021 – 20 September 2022
- Prime Minister: Boris Johnson; Liz Truss
- Preceded by: Dame Caroline Dinenage
- Succeeded by: Stuart Andrew (Sport, Arts and Ceremonials)

Lord-in-Waiting Government Whip
- In office 14 February 2020 – 20 September 2022
- Prime Minister: Boris Johnson; Liz Truss
- Preceded by: The Baroness Chisholm of Owlpen

Member of the House of Lords
- Lord Temporal
- Life peerage 8 October 2019

Political Secretary to the prime minister of the United Kingdom
- In office 13 July 2016 – 24 July 2019
- Prime Minister: Theresa May
- Preceded by: Laurence Mann
- Succeeded by: Danny Kruger

Personal details
- Born: Stephen Graeme Parkinson; 30 June 1983 (age 43) North Shields, England
- Party: Conservative
- Education: Emmanuel College, Cambridge

Stephen Parkinson, Baron Parkinson of Whitley Bay (born 30 June 1983) is a British Conservative member of the House of Lords who served as Parliamentary Under-Secretary of State for Arts, Heritage and Libraries from March 2022 to July 2024.

Lord Parkinson was previously a Special Adviser to Theresa May when she was Home Secretary and Prime Minister, and previously a think tank researcher and lobbyist.

== Education ==
Parkinson was born in North Shields, and attended Park House School in Newbury, Berkshire, before reading History at Emmanuel College, Cambridge, from 2001 to 2004, where he graduated with a BA (proceeding MA). During his time at Cambridge, Parkinson served as Chairman of the Cambridge University Conservative Association in the 2003 Lent term, and President of the Cambridge Union in Lent 2004. Parkinson subsequently wrote a history of the Cambridge Union, Arena of Ambition, published in 2009.

== Conservative politics - in opposition (2004–10) ==
After graduating from Cambridge in 2004, Parkinson went to work on the Home Affairs desk at the Conservative Research Department, including during the 2005 general election. Later that year, he transferred to the department's Political Section to engage in opposition research on other parties, briefing Shadow Ministers ahead of media appearances, and was part of David Cameron's briefing team as Leader of HM Opposition ahead of Prime Minister's Questions.

In 2006, Parkinson left the Conservative Research Department to take up a post as director of research at the Conservative think-tank, the Centre for Policy Studies. He remained there until late 2007, when he returned to Conservative Central Office, focussing on the party's target seats campaign. He continued working at Central Office until the 2010 general election.

== Lobbying career (2010-2012) ==
After the 2010 election, with the Conservative Party returned to government, Parkinson left Central Office to become a lobbyist with Quiller Consultants, remaining there for two years.

=== 2011 AV referendum campaign ===
During his time at Quiller, Parkinson also played a key role in the victorious NOtoAV campaign in the 2011 United Kingdom Alternative Vote referendum, serving as the Conservative Party's National Organiser in the cross-party campaign.

== Government roles (2012-present) ==
=== Home Office Special Adviser ===
In 2012 Parkinson was appointed a Special Adviser to Theresa May when she was Home Secretary. He continued in this role until the autumn of 2015.

=== 2016 EU Referendum campaign ===
In October 2015, Parkinson left his role as Special Adviser at the Home Office to become National Organiser of the ground operation for the successful Vote Leave campaign in the 2016 United Kingdom European Union membership referendum.

=== Downing Street Special Adviser ===
In the aftermath of the June 2016 EU Referendum campaign, Theresa May became Prime Minister the following month, whereupon Parkinson rejoined her as a Special Adviser based in Downing Street, with the job title of Political Secretary to the Prime Minister.

== Parliamentary candidacies and selections (2010-2017) ==
=== First parliamentary candidature, 2010 ===
At the 2010 general election, Parkinson stood as the Conservative candidate for Newcastle upon Tyne North, having been selected the previous year. He came third, polling 7,966 votes (18.1%), although he managed to increase the Conservative vote by a third.

=== Attempts to stand in 2015, and temporary removal from the candidates' list ===
Parkinson had declared his interest in standing for a winnable constituency at the 2015 general election, and had been tipped for the shortlist in safe seats such as Richmond, Yorkshire; but in December 2014, he and another of May's Special Advisers, Nick Timothy, became involved in a candidate selection row. Both were removed from the Conservative Party's list of approved candidates by Party Chairman Grant Shapps, reportedly on the instructions of David Cameron, because of his growing alarm at having such key allies of a leadership rival such as Theresa May in the House of Commons, and Parkinson and Timothy were given the pretext that neither had campaigned in the Rochester and Strood by-election (with such campaigning being a requirement of candidates staying on the approved list). Both Parkinson and Timothy protested that as Special Advisers, they were bound by the Civil Service Code of Conduct, which specifically forbids senior civil servants from engaging in political campaigning. The Conservative Party subsequently apologised to both Parkinson and Timothy, but by that time it was too late for either to apply for a seat.

=== Selection contest for Saffron Walden, 2017 ===
On 28 April 2017, with Prime Minister Theresa May having called a snap general election ten days earlier, it was reported that Parkinson had been shortlisted for the "safe seat" of Saffron Walden, following veteran MP Sir Alan (now Lord) Haselhurst announcing his retirement from the Commons.

Analysing the shortlist, former MP and ConservativeHome Executive Editor Paul Goodman noted that, "Nor to date have SpAds been shoehorned into constituencies against weak opposition", but that, "The case of Saffron Walden is perhaps more suggestive. Stephen Parkinson, the Prime Minister's Political Secretary and the former head of the ground campaign at Vote Leave, is up against Katherine Bennett, who hasn't fought a Parliamentary election previously, and Kemi Badenoch, a member of the London Assembly who was beaten in the first round in [the Conservative selection contest for] Hampstead and Kilburn." It was subsequently reported by the Daily Telegraph that Saffron Walden was one of four seats where Conservative activists had complained of a "selection stitch-up" over a Special Adviser being shortlisted alongside little-known rivals on the shortlist (with other instances being Alex Burghart, May's Social Justice Policy Adviser shortlisted in Brentwood and Ongar; Chris Brannigan, Director of Government Relations at No. 10 Downing Street shortlisted in Aldershot; and Neil O'Brien, May's Economy and Industrial Strategy Adviser who was reportedly putting his name forward for safe seats). The Telegraph cited these instances of how "the party's leadership has been accused of using a rule change because of the snap election to 'foist its own friends onto local parties'." Total Politics similarly asserted that "Theresa May now risks charges of election cronyism" after the shortlisting of so many Special Advisers, including Parkinson and Burghart, alongside James Wild (Special Adviser to Defence Secretary Sir Michael Fallon) selected in Norfolk North, Meg Powell-Chandler (former Special Adviser to Communities Secretary Greg Clark) selected in Birmingham Northfield, and Parkinson's university contemporary Will Gallagher (former Special Adviser to Justice Secretary Chris Grayling) selected in City of Chester.

In the event, after a last-minute change in the final line-up on the shortlist of three, with Katherine Bennett being replaced by Laura Farris, the Saffron Walden Conservative Association selected Kemi Badenoch for the seat rather than Farris or Parkinson, with Badenoch winning on the first ballot.

Parkinson could not stand for election to the House of Commons at the following general election in 2019, having been elevated to the House of Lords just prior to the Dissolution of Parliament.

== House of Lords (2019 to present) ==
He was nominated for a life peerage in Theresa May's resignation honours, being created Baron Parkinson of Whitley Bay, of Beyton in the County of Suffolk on 8 October 2019. He was introduced to the House of Lords to sit on the Conservative benches later that month. Aged 36, Lord Parkinson became the Baby of the House (the youngest peer in the House of Lords) for 24 hours until the ennoblement the following day of his fellow Special Adviser to Theresa May, Jojo Penn. Baroness Penn being two years his junior succeeded him as the "Baby of the House".

Three weeks after being ennobled, Lord Parkinson joined the Gambling Industry Committee. In his maiden speech in the Lords in January 2020, he opened by saying that he wished "to remind your Lordships of the large number of people who are concerned about the rapidly growing population and the contribution that net migration makes to that", before stressing "the sensible tradition of steering clear of contentious topics in one's maiden speech" as a caveat ahead of his then criticising the Supreme Court of the United Kingdom.

In February 2020 Parkinson joined HM Government as a Lord-in-Waiting. In September 2021 he was promoted Parliamentary Under-Secretary of State in the Department for Digital, Culture, Media and Sport (DCMS), being designated Minister for Art.

During an interview on Sky News on 31 May 2022, Lord Parkinson asserted that imperial measurements, which the government was proposing to reintroduce, are "universally understood"; and, when questioned, that there are 14 ounces in a pound (the actual number is 16) and that one pound corresponds to 250g (the actual number is 454).

As a government minister, Parkinson has promoted the Online Safety Bill.

== Controversies ==
In March 2017, Channel 4 News reported that, according to a cache of leaked documents and emails, Parkinson was one of the Conservative Party's senior campaigns figures at the heart of the party election spending investigation relating to alleged over-spending during the 2015 general election campaign.

In March 2018, Parkinson's ex-boyfriend Shahmir Sanni stated that he had directed the activities of pro-Brexit pressure group BeLeave, in breach of electoral financing laws, through him in his position as a BeLeave volunteer. In response, Parkinson issued a Downing Street press release, marked 'official', which revealed he had been in a relationship with Sanni during the referendum and arguing he had only offered 'advice and encouragement' in the context of their relationship rather than direction. Sanni said in subsequent media appearances that he had to organise security for his family who live in Pakistan because of the unlawful status of homosexuality within the country, and accused Parkinson of "outing him" against his will. Theresa May refused to remove Parkinson, stating that "My political secretary does a very good job as my political secretary" in response to a question from Dame Angela Eagle.

== See also ==
- Department for Digital, Culture, Media and Sport

== Writings ==
=== Book ===
- Arena of Ambition: A History of the Cambridge Union (Icon Books, London, 2009).

=== Articles ===
- "Ten Ways to Help NO2AV in the Next Hundred Days", ConservativeHome, 25 January 2011.
- "No Alternative: the unhappy history of the Alternative Vote", Conservative History Journal, Vol. I, Issue 10 (2011).
- "Tory Olympians: Conservative Parliamentarians and the modern Olympic Games", Conservative History Journal, Vol. II, Issue 1 (2012).
- "The St. Stephen's Club, 1870-2012", Conservative History Journal, Vol. II, Issue 1 (2012).
- "Sir Geoffrey Butler and the Tory Tradition", Conservative History Journal, Vol. II, Issue 3 (2014).
- "Mavis Tate and the Horrors of Buchenwald", Conservative History Journal, Vol. II, Issue 4 (2015).
- "A flawed first draft of history: Theresa May's former political secretary on the biography that doesn't get her right - Anthony Seldon, May at 10", The Critic, December 2019.

Orders of precedence in the United Kingdom
Preceded by The Lord Barwell	Gentlemen; Baron Parkinson of Whitley Bay	Followed by The Lord Choudrey
Government offices
Preceded by Laurence Mann	Political Secretary to the Prime Minister; 2016–2019	Succeeded by Danny Kruger
