= Communications and Digital Committee =

Select committee of the House of Lords

The Communications and Digital Committee is a select committee of the House of Lords with the broad remit to "consider the media, digital and creative industries".

== History ==
The first report of the House of Lords Communications and Digital Committee, about the BBC was issued on 25 July 2007. Previous to this, there had been ad hoc committees reporting on other topics.

== Scope and activities ==
The remit of the committee is to "consider the media, digital and creative industries".

Between 2006 and 2010, the Committee has held inquiries into the Chairmanship of the BBC, the focus and structure of Government communications with the public and the media, ownership of news media outlets, and the digital television and radio switchovers.

=== A Creative Future ===
In October–November 2022, the committee conducted an inquiry into the future of creative industries in the UK, called "A creative future", also referred to as "Creative Futures". It received many submissions, including from the Creative Industries Policy Evidence Centre, the National Foundation for Educational Research, the life-size AI robot artist Ai-Da, Equity, and The Publishers Association. Its report was published in January 2023 covering text and data mining; securing performers' rights; intellectual property and international trade; and AI and jobs.

== Chairs ==
Committee chairs include those listed below.

Name	Start	End	Party
The Earl of Onslow	22 June 2010	7 March 2011	Conservative
The Lord Inglewood	7 March 2011	14 May 2014	Conservative
The Lord Best	12 June 2014	27 April 2017	Crossbench
The Lord Henley	27 June 2017	27 October 2017	Conservative
The Lord Gilbert of Panteg	6 November 2017	19 January 2022	Conservative
The Baroness Stowell of Beeston	19 January 2022	30 January 2025	Conservative
The Baroness Keeley	30 January 2025	present	Labour

== Membership ==
As of June 2026, the membership of the committee is as follows:

Member	Party
Baroness Keeley(Chair)	Labour
Baroness Caine of Kentish Town	Labour
Viscount Colville of Culross	Crossbench
Baroness Elliott of Whitburn Bay	Labour
Baroness Fleet	Conservative
Lord Holmes of Richmond	Conservative
Lord Kirkhope of Harrogate	Conservative
Lord Knight of Weymouth	Labour
Lord McNally	Liberal Democrat
Baroness Owen of Alderley Edge	Conservative
Lord Storey	Liberal Democrat
Lord Tarassenko	Crossbench
Lord Bishop of Winchester	Bishops
