= Gerard Russell (diplomat) =

British diplomat and author

Gerard Russell is a former British diplomat in the Middle East, author and lobbyist.

Russell is a former British and United Nations diplomat, who spent 14 years representing Britain in the Middle East. Russell speaks Arabic and Dari.

In January 2010 he became a Research Fellow at the Harvard Kennedy School's Carr Center for Human Rights Policy. He later worked for the lobbyist Quiller Consultants where he led efforts funded by the United Arab Emirates, including successfully persuading journalists at the Daily Telegraph to write negative articles about Qatar's role in funding terrorism.

== Heirs to Forgotten Kingdoms ==
Russell's 2014 book, Heirs to Forgotten Kingdoms, published by Basic Books is a chronicle of the vanishing religious minorities of the Middle East, including the Yazidis, Mandaeans, Zoroastrians, Druze, Samaritans, Copts, and Kalasha.

== Website ==
His personal website can be found at https://gerardrussell.com/.
