= Peter Gummer, Baron Chadlington =

English businessman (born 1942)

The Right Honourable The Lord Chadlington FCIPR FIoD FCIM FRSA

Member of the House of Lords
- Lord Temporal
- Life peerage 16 October 1996 – 7 March 2026

Personal details
- Born: Peter Selwyn Gummer; 24 August 1942 (age 83)
- Party: Independent (since 2026)
- Other political affiliations: Conservative (until 2026)
- Relatives: John Gummer (brother); Ben Gummer (nephew)
- Occupation: Businessman, public relations executive at Huntsworth, lobbyist

Peter Selwyn Gummer, Baron Chadlington (born 24 August 1942) is an English businessman and former head of Huntsworth, one of the largest lobbying firms in the United Kingdom.

He was president of the Witney Conservative constituency association, and is a PR adviser, long-standing supporter and donor to the Conservative Party. In 2026, Gummer resigned from the House of Lords and the Conservative Party following an investigation by the Lords Commissioner for Standards into his conduct, which found that he had not acted "on his personal honour".

== Early life and education ==
Gummer was born on 24 August 1942 to Selwyn Gummer, a Church of England priest, and his wife Margaret Mason. Gummer has two brothers: John Gummer, Baron Deben, former Chairman of the Conservative Party, and Mark Selwyn Gummer. He was educated at The King's School, Rochester. He then studied Moral Science and Theology, at Selwyn College, Cambridge, with the aim of becoming a priest. Reading the works of philosophers such as Albert Camus led him to change his mind, and after gaining a Bachelor of Arts and Master of Arts he instead went into journalism.

== Career ==
Gummer's first job after university was at Portsmouth and Sunderland Newspaper, where he worked 1964-65. Later, while writing for a trade press department Gummer found that he enjoyed the business side of things far more than the journalism, and decided to go into business. After several years working for other companies he founded a public relations (PR) firm called Shandwick in 1974, serving as its chairman. Within seven years Shandwick was the largest PR company in the United Kingdom, and in 1984 it became publicly listed. In 1998 it was sold to the Interpublic Group of Companies, and is now part of Huntsworth. Initially chairman of Huntsworth, Gummer was appointed chief executive on 25 September 2005 after the resignation of Richard Nichols, the group's previous chief executive. In 2006, Huntsworth bought Quiller Consultants, a lobbying firm that represents major financial, retail and telecoms companies. Huntsworth also owns Graylings, which lobbies for some of Britains leading companies, like National Grid and BT, and has carried out PR work for Belarus. At Huntsworth, Gummer personally lobbied for several clients, including the Stock Exchange, Associated British Foods and the Carlyle Group. In 2009, The Guardian reported Lord Chadlington earned "an estimated £30,000 for advising private equity companies on issues currently being examined by the Commons Treasury Select Committee".

Following falling profits and share prices and increasing discontent from shareholders (30 percent of shareholders abstained from voting for Gummer's re-election to the board), Gummer left his position at Huntsworth in April 2015, instead becoming an executive director, and left the company the following year.

As well as his public relations work, Gummer is also a non-executive director of Britax, a former director of Halifax and a visiting fellow at the University of Gloucestershire. He has been made a fellow of the Chartered Institute of Public Relations, the Institute of Directors, The Chartered Institute of Marketing and the Royal Society of Arts.

Gummer worked for the Arts Council from 1991 to 1996 and was head of the Council's lottery panel, deciding how funds should be distributed - for example, issuing £78.5 million to the Royal Opera House and £80 million to the British film industry.

In September 1996 Gummer became chairman of the Royal Opera House. Following a report by the House of Commons Culture, Media and Sport Committee led by Gerald Kaufman, which described the management of the Royal Opera House as "abysmal" with "incompetence, disastrous financial planning and misjudgement", Gummer resigned in December 1997.

== Politics ==
Chadlington is president of the Witney Conservative constituency association, and is a PR adviser, long-standing supporter and donor to the Conservative Party. His brother, John Gummer, was a Conservative politician and cabinet minister. Chadlington was John Major's most trusted advisor during his premiership and advised him and the Foreign Office on media relations during the Gulf War. Chadlington is an adviser, donor, close friend and political ally of David Cameron, supporting him during his successful bid to become leader of the Conservative party in 2005, when Cameron was MP of Chadlinton's constituency. Chadlington was also close to Chris Patten when he was chair of the Conservative party.

Chadlington ran the United Kingdom's largest lobbying firm, Huntsworth, and, before that, Shandwick, described by The Times in 1991 and The Independent in 1997 as the world's largest public relations business. On his personal books at Huntsworth were the Stock Exchange, Associated British Foods and the Carlyle Group, among others. Chadlington and Huntsworth are major donors to the Conservative party: for instance, the peer and his company donated £77,000 to the party between 2005 and 2010.

Chadlington and his PR firms have been instrumental in devising Conservative election campaigns, including those in 1992 and 1997.

On 16 October 1996, Gummer was created a Conservative working peer, with the title of Baron Chadlington, of Dean in the County of Oxfordshire.

== Charitable work ==
From 1999 until 2007, Gummer was a Director of the original Action on Addiction in London, a charity and addiction research centre investigating drug and alcohol dependence. He also served on their board of trustees. In 2007, the original Action on Addiction (established in 1989) merged with The Chemical Dependency Centre (established in 1985) and Clouds (established in 1987). The single charity, dedicated to the research and treatment of drug and alcohol dependence, took on the name Action on Addiction. He also founded the charity Action Against Gambling Harms, and lobbied the UK government to tighten gambling laws.

== Personal life ==
He married Lucy Dudley-Hill on 23 October 1982. They met after she came to his PR firm Shandwick for a job interview, and after five days they were engaged. They have four children: Naomi, Chloe, Eleanor and James.

On 16 October 1996, Gummer was created a Conservative working peer, with the title of Baron Chadlington, of Dean in the County of Oxfordshire.

Gummer is an adviser, neighbour, and longstanding friend of politician David Cameron. While prime minister, Cameron attended the 2012 wedding of Gummer's daughter Naomi to Henry Allsop, son of Charles Allsopp, 6th Baron Hindlip. Allsop's godmother, the then Duchess of Cornwall, and Jeremy Hunt, then Culture Secretary and Naomi's former boss, also attended.

== Controversies ==
=== Mismanagement of the Royal Opera House ===
In September 1996 Gummer became chairman of the Royal Opera House (RHO). He had previously chaired the Arts Council's lottery panel, which had issued £78.5 million to the ROH. According to Dan Glaister, arts editor at The Guardian, public perception was that Chadlington had "written a cheque, walked around the table and pocketed it". Under Chadlington's leadership, there was also a turnover of senior staff, including Jeremy Isaacs being replaced as house director by Genista McIntosh, who left after four months citing ill-health, although there were rumours that she had been driven out by Chadlington and another board member, Vivien Duffield, because she wanted to lower ticket prices to attract new audiences. It later emerged that McIntosh objected to liberties members of the board were taking, using their privilege to, for instance, rearrange the casting for the ballet for the nights when they were bringing guests. Chadlington appointed his friend and former colleague at the Arts Council Mary Allen as McIntosh's replacement, but the position had not been advertised. When secretary-general of the Arts Council, Allen had authorised the award of £78 million of lottery money to the RHO. The RHO made £750,000 deficit in two months of its 1997 touring programme. A number of reports commented on outdated practices and poor management at the RHO. Chadlington didn't appoint a financial director for a year and the RHO did not keep regular accounts; the RHO was in £7 million of debt. In July 1997, the House of Commons Culture, Media and Sport Committee, led by Gerald Kaufman, opened an investigation into the management of the RHO. The committee released its report in December 1997, describing the management of the Royal Opera House as "abysmal" with "incompetence, disastrous financial planning and misjudgement". Gummer resigned that month.

=== Priming private equity leaders before parliamentary inquiry ===
In 2007, Chadlington helped senior figures from several large private equity firms prepare for an appearance before the Treasury Select Committee, which was investigating the activities of the private equity industry. The peer, a PR expert, did not lodge a contact with the House of Lords for this work for Permira, Kohlberg Kravis Roberts, 3i and the Carlyle Group, which was in breach of the Lords Code of Conduct.

=== Daughter's appointment to Whitehall ===
In 2010, then culture secretary Jeremy Hunt gave Chadlington's daughter, Naomi, a civil service post in the Department for Culture, Media and Sport (DCMS). Doing so was considered by people in Whitehall as "highly unusual" and "not normal" and Hunt was criticized for giving the role to a close business associate (between 2000 and 2004, Chadlington was director of Hotcourses, a company Hunt founded), a major donor to the Tory party (Chadlington having given more than £77,000 to the Tories between 2005 and 2010), and one of prime minister David Cameron's political allies (as president of Witney Conservative association, Cameron's constituency, Chadlington was a major supporter of Cameron's campaign to become Tory leader in 2005). The appointment came weeks after the government announced there would be a freeze on hiring in the civil service. Mark Serwotka, the leader of the PCS union, which represents civil servants, questioned whether the appointment was made because of "nepotism and privilege".

=== Sale of land to the prime minister ===
In 2011, Chadlington sold land to the then prime minister David Cameron. The previous year, Chadlington had bought a property adjoining Cameron's constituency home and the property remained empty. Initially, Chadlington offered the land to Cameron but then sold land to him for £137,000, the market rate plus extra to allow for the increase in value the land would bring to Cameron's home. The newly bought land increased the value of Cameron's property by approximately £250,000. In the opinion of Sir Alistair Graham, former chairman of the Committee of Standards in Public Life, Cameron should have declared the transaction to parliament's registry of interest as Chadlington was the head of one of the largest lobbying firms in the country. The year before the transaction, Cameron's government had pledged to crack down on lobbying, with Cameron making a speech that it was time to shine "the light of transparency onto lobbying in our country" and force "our politics to come clean about who is buying power and influence". Downing Street said there was no need for the sale to be listed in the registry of interests because there was a land registry record from the transaction that already put it into the public public domain. Chadlington said, "To avoid any perception of a conflict, we instructed an independent surveyor to value the garages and land. We did not negotiate on price – the Prime Minister paid the market rate as recommended by the surveyor."

=== UK-China investment fund ===
In 2017, David Cameron lobbied the Chinese government on behalf of Chadlington in order to establish a £500 million private investment fund. Chadlington, who initiated and was the main driver behind the fund, had been working on the fund for three years and travelled to China with Cameron, where the former prime minister met with Ma Kai, a Chinese vice-premier who headed Beijing's finance ministry, to discuss the proposal. Cameron had also lobbied the then British chancellor, Philip Hammond, about setting up the fund. Cameron's meetings with Ma and Hammond did not break any parliamentary rules and did not have to be cleared with the Advisory Committee on Business Appointments because the fund had not yet been set up. They did, however, raise questions about the robustness of parliamentary lobbying rules, which usually ban former ministers from lobbying for two years, with Peter Dowd, then shadow chief secretary to the Treasury, commenting, "it appears the former prime minister's status and personal relationships have allowed him ministerial contact without having to go through adequate motions of transparency".

=== COVID-19 PPE contact ===
In 2020, Chadlington gave SG Recruitment chief executive and owner David Sumner the email address of Lord Andrew Feldman, who was advisor to the Department of Health and Social Care (DHSC) during the early stages of the government response to the COVID-19 pandemic. Feldman referred the company, which recruited nurses for the NHS from countries overseas, to the "VIP lane" that gave priority to politically connected firms offering personal protective equipment (PPE). SG Recruitment (later renamed Sumner Group Health Limited) was awarded two government contracts, worth £50 million, to supply PPE. Chadlington, listed by the DHSC as the "source of referral" for SG Recruitment's referral to the government, was also a director and shareholder of SG Recruitment's parent company, Sumner Group Holdings, registered in Jersey. At the time of Chadlington's referral, SG Recruitment was "a small, loss-making company that supplied healthcare workers to the NHS, and appears to have had no experience providing PPE", with its parent company having faced recent financial difficulties (it liquidated in October 2022).

In January 2022, following a challenge from the Good Law Project, the "VIP lane" was ruled unlawful as it gave unequal treatment to companies by the government. In May 2022, the House of Lords Commissioners for Standards announced an investigation into Chadlington for "alleged involvement in procuring contracts for SG Recruitment UK", leading to potential breaches of two rules in peers' code of conduct: that peers must not accept or agree to accept "payment or other incentive or reward in return for providing parliamentary advice or services", and that peers "must not seek by parliamentary means to confer exclusive benefit" on a company in which they have a financial interest. In July 2022, Akbar Khan, who was then one of the Commissioners for Standards, cleared Chadlington of lobbying for the contracts on the basis that he had not directly approached the government about SG Recruitment. Following the ruling, the Labour party called for a review of the Lords watchdog's rules, Labour peer George Foulkes commenting that the ruling "indicates that the code needs revision to take account of more subtle approaches."

In July 2023, the Lords standards committee opened a second inquiry into the peer, reinvestigating potential breaches of lobbying rules, following potential discrepancies between accounts from Chadlington and from his lawyers regarding the extent of Chadlington's involvement in government procurement of PPE through SG Recruitment. Foulkes, who called for the reinvestigation, said the Commissioner for Standards should also investigate whether Chadlington had misled the watchdog. However, Chadlington was cleared again after he told the Lords Commissioner in writing in August 2023 that he did not “facilitate an introduction” of SG Recruitment’s majority owner, David Sumner, to Feldman.

By the end of 2023 Sumner Group Health, as SG Recruitment was now known, was in liquidation owing unpaid taxes. The government was in a dispute over one of the SG Recruitment contracts, a source telling The Guardian that some of the PPE had allegedly not been supplied and some was substandard. With the parent company having gone into liquidation earlier, media reports suggested that the government was unlikely to recover any money for the unusable PPE. The government was owed £24m.

In 2025 the House of Lords launched a third investigation following publication by the UK COVID-19 Inquiry of messages sent by Chadlington introducing SG Recruitment to government. The Lords Commissioner for Standards focused not only on potential rule breaches regarding lobbying and financial interest, but also on whether Chadlington upheld “personal honour” in his parliamentary activities.

In March 2026 this third investigation concluded that Chadlington’s COVID PPE deals breached standards on five occasions. Separately, it also noted his consistent failure to cooperate with previous inquiries, concluding that Chadlington thus “did not act on his personal honour”. In response, Chadlington announced his retirement from the House of Lords and resignation from the Conservative Party.

== Arms ==
Coat of arms of Peter Gummer, Baron Chadlington
Crest A cock wings elevated and addorsed Or beaked combed jelloped and legged Gules grasping in the dexter claws a lily of the valley Argent slipped and leaved Or. Escutcheon Gules a cross potent nowy quadrate Argent between four escallops fukes inwards Or. Supporters On either side a falcon reguardant Argent beaked and legged Gules belled Or and holding in the beak a rose Gules barbed seeded slipped and leaved Or. Motto Never Give Up

Orders of precedence in the United Kingdom
Preceded by The Lord Alderdice	Gentlemen; The Lord Chadlington	Followed by The Lord MacLaurin of Knebworth
