= Huntsworth =

U.K communications company

- Type: Private
- Industry: Pharmaceuticals
- Founder: Lord Chadlington
- Headquarters: London, England
- Number of locations: 50 principal offices in 28 countries
- Area served: Worldwide
- Key people: Liam FitzGerald (Chairman); Neil Jones (CEO)
- Services: Integrated healthcare communications
- Owner: Clayton, Dubilier & Rice
- Subsidiaries: Medistrava; Evoke; The Creative Engagement Group; Grayling; Citigate Dewe Rogerson; Red
- Website: www.huntsworth.com

Huntsworth Plc is an international healthcare and communications group.

The Group's principal area of focus is health, which provides marketing and medical communications services to healthcare clients, which are primarily large and mid-size pharmaceutical and biotech companies. Huntsworth is owned by private investment firm Clayton, Dubilier & Rice.

== Clients ==
Graylings has lobbied for some of Britain's leading companies, like National Grid and BT, and has carried out PR work for Belarus. When working for Huntsworth, its founder Lord Chadlington personally lobbied for several clients, including the London Stock Exchange, Associated British Foods and the Carlyle Group. Chadlington would also advise private equity companies on issues being examined by the Commons Treasury Select Committee as well as prime senior figures from private equity firms such as Permira, KKR, 3i and the Carlyle Group before they appeared before the Treasury Select Committee.

== Political connections ==
Huntsworth is a major donor to the UK Conservative Party: between them, Lord Chadlington and Huntsworth donated £77,000 to the Tories between 2005 and 2010.
