= November 2023 British cabinet reshuffle =

Second cabinet reshuffle undertaken by UK Prime Minister Rishi Sunak

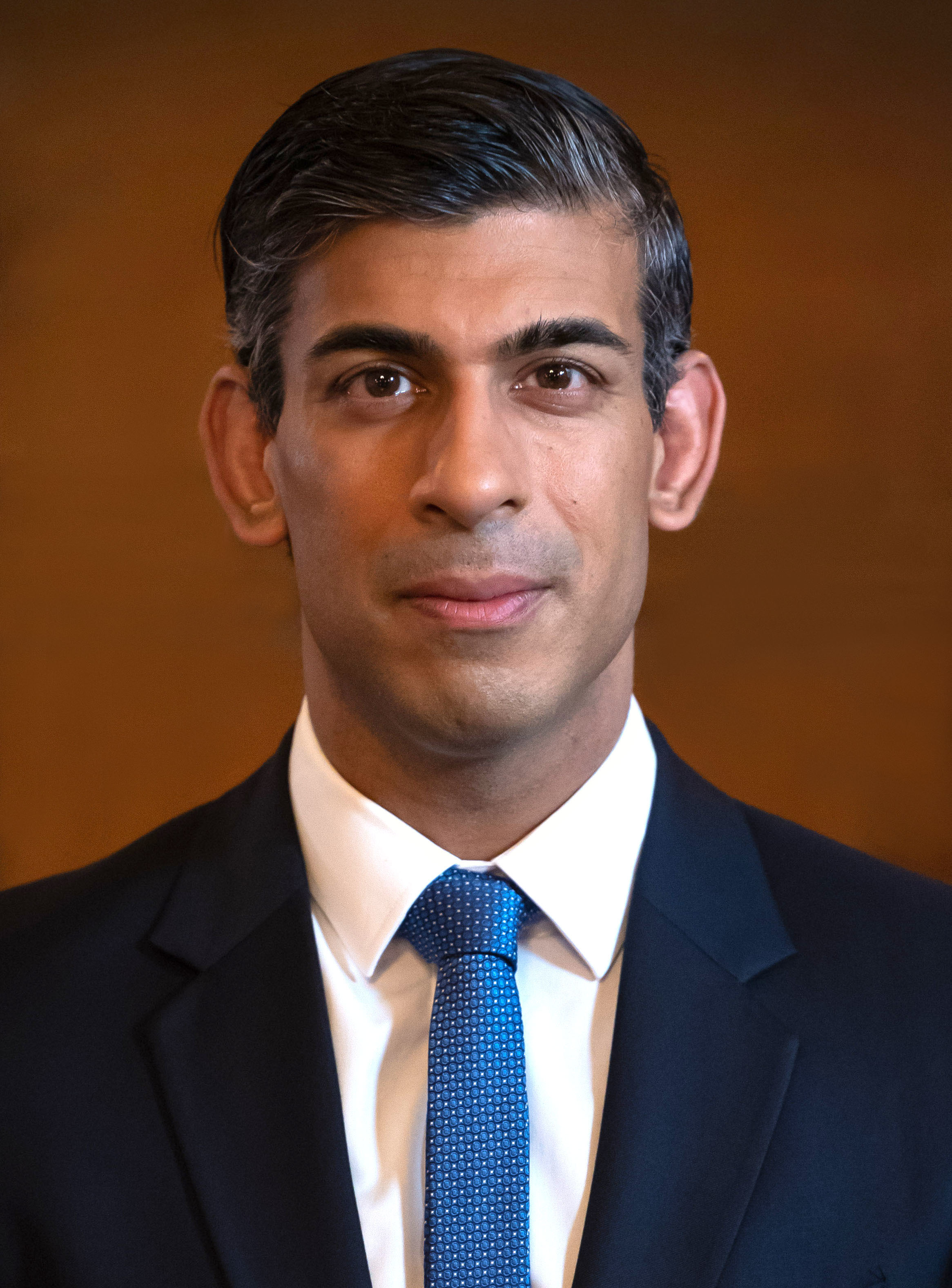
Prime Minister Rishi Sunak (Official portrait, 2022)

British prime minister Rishi Sunak carried out the second cabinet reshuffle of his premiership on 13 November 2023. Suella Braverman was replaced as Home Secretary by James Cleverly. Cleverly was replaced as Foreign Secretary by the former Prime Minister David Cameron, who was made a life peer as Baron Cameron of Chipping Norton.

== Changes ==
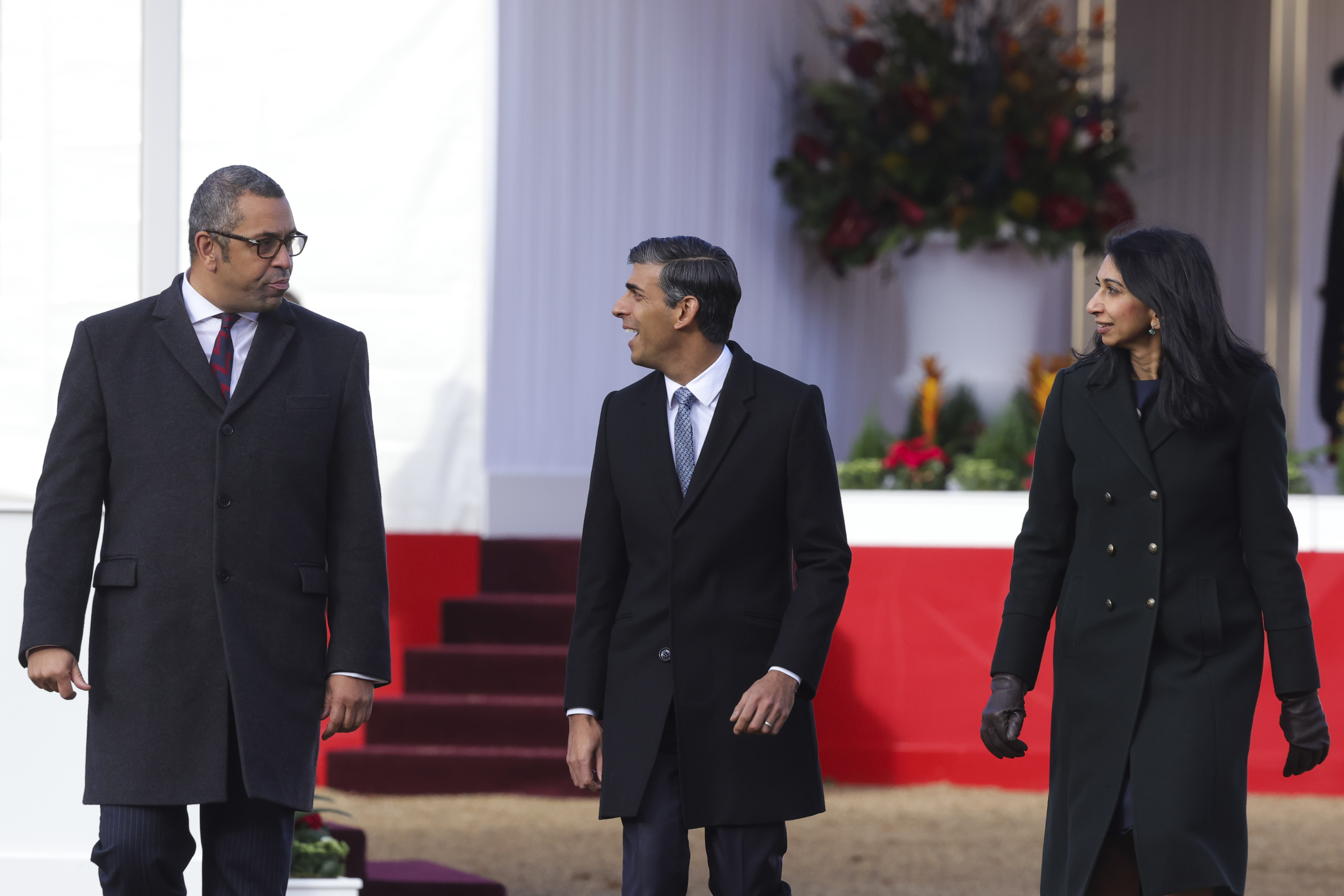
Sunak (middle) dismissed Braverman (right) as Home Secretary and replaced her with Cleverly (left). Photo taken in November 2022, a year before the reshuffle.

Amid rising tensions the previous week, Sunak sacked Suella Braverman from her position as Home Secretary on 13 November 2023. She had previously been sacked from the same position by Sunak's predecessor Liz Truss in October 2022. According to The Guardian, the trigger for her sacking was an article she wrote and published in The Times on 8 November 2023, which included a statement that there was "a perception that senior police officers play favourites when it comes to protesters" and were tougher on rightwing extremists than pro-Palestinian "mobs". The Guardian reported that the prime minister's office had asked for changes to be made to the article, but not all were implemented. She was replaced by the Foreign Secretary James Cleverly.

With the foreign secretary's office falling vacant, party grandee Lord Hague reportedly negotiated a deal between Sunak and the former prime minister David Cameron that saw Cameron appointed Foreign Secretary. Since Cameron had resigned from parliament on 12 September 2016, it was announced on the morning of the reshuffle that he would be appointed to a life peerage. He is the first foreign secretary to serve from the House of Lords since Lord Carrington (1979–1982) and the first former prime minister to return to Cabinet since Alec Douglas-Home (1970–1974). Following the appointment of Cleverly as Home Secretary and Cameron as Foreign Secretary, all four Great Offices of State were held by men for the first time since 2010.

The Environment Secretary Thérèse Coffey announced that she had resigned after serving in the government since 2014 under five prime ministers. Coffey was replaced by the Health Secretary Steve Barclay, with the Financial Secretary to the Treasury Victoria Atkins being promoted to Health Secretary.

The Minister for the Cabinet Office and Paymaster General Jeremy Quin stated that, despite being asked to continue to serve in government, he had resigned from his positions. He was replaced by John Glen, with Laura Trott being promoted to Glen's former position as Chief Secretary to the Treasury.

Richard Holden was appointed Chairman of the Conservative Party and Minister without Portfolio following Greg Hands' demotion to Minister of State at the Department for Business and Trade.

The backbencher Esther McVey was appointed Minister without Portfolio in the Cabinet Office.

== Cabinet-level changes ==
Colour key
- Joined the Cabinet
- Left the Cabinet

Minister	Position before reshuffle	Position after reshuffle
Suella Braverman	Home Secretary	Dismissed from the government
James Cleverly	Foreign Secretary	Home Secretary
David Cameron	None (Note: former Prime Minister (2010 – 2016). Appointed to the House of Lords as Lord Cameron of Chipping Norton on 17 November 2023.)	Foreign Secretary
Thérèse Coffey	Secretary of State for Environment, Food and Rural Affairs	Resigned from the government
Steve Barclay	Secretary of State for Health and Social Care	Secretary of State for Environment, Food and Rural Affairs
Victoria Atkins	Financial Secretary to the Treasury	Secretary of State for Health and Social Care
Jeremy Quin	Minister for the Cabinet Office; Paymaster General	Resigned from the government
John Glen	Chief Secretary to the Treasury	Minister for the Cabinet Office; Paymaster General
Laura Trott	Parliamentary Under-Secretary of State for Pensions	Chief Secretary to the Treasury
Greg Hands	Chairman of the Conservative Party; Minister without Portfolio	Minister of State for Trade Policy; Minister for London
Richard Holden	Parliamentary Under Secretary of State for Roads and Local Transport	Chairman of the Conservative Party; Minister without Portfolio
Esther McVey	Backbench MP	Minister without portfolio

== Junior ministerial changes ==
Colour key
- Promoted (Note: According to the ministerial pay scale: Minister of State > Parliamentary Under-Secretary of State > Parliamentary Private Secretary)
- Left the government

Minister	Position before reshuffle	Position after reshuffle
Nick Gibb	Minister of State for Schools	Resigned from the government
Damian Hinds	Minister of State for Prisons, Parole and Probation	Minister of State for Schools
Laura Farris	Backbench MP	Parliamentary Under Secretary of State for Victims and Safeguarding
Neil O'Brien	Parliamentary Under-Secretary of State for Primary Care and Public Health	Resigned from the government
Andrea Leadsom	Backbench MP	Parliamentary Under-Secretary of State for Public Health, Start for Life and Primary Care
Will Quince	Minister of State for Health and Secondary Care	Resigned from the government
Andrew Stephenson	Lord Commissioner of the Treasury	Minister of State for Health and Secondary Care
Jesse Norman	Minister of State for Transport	Resigned from the government
Rachel Maclean	Minister of State for Housing and Planning	Dismissed from the government
George Freeman	Minister of State for Science, Research and Innovation	Resigned from the government
Lee Rowley	Parliamentary Under-Secretary of State for Local Government and Building Safety	Minister of State for Housing, Planning and Building Safety
Jo Churchill	Vice-Chamberlain of the Household	Minister of State for Employment
Andrew Griffith	Economic Secretary to the Treasury	Minister of State for Science, Research and Innovation
Nigel Huddleston	Minister of State for International Trade	Financial Secretary to the Treasury
Paul Scully	Minister for London; Parliamentary Under-Secretary of State for Tech and the Digital Economy	Dismissed from the government
Bim Afolami	Backbench MP	Economic Secretary to the Treasury
Gareth Bacon	Backbench MP	Parliamentary Under Secretary of State for Sentencing
Saqib Bhatti	Backbench MP	Parliamentary Under-Secretary of State for Tech and the Digital Economy
Anthony Browne	Backbench MP	Parliamentary Under Secretary of State in the Department for Transport
Simon Hoare	Backbench MP	Parliamentary Under Secretary of State for Local Government
Fay Jones	Assistant government whip	Parliamentary Under-Secretary of State for Wales
Paul Maynard	Backbench MP	Parliamentary Under-Secretary of State for Pensions
Robbie Moore	Backbench MP	Parliamentary Under-Secretary of State for Water and Rural Growth
Guy Opperman	Minister of State for Employment	Parliamentary Under Secretary of State in the Department for Transport
Stuart Anderson	Lord Commissioner of the Treasury	Vice-Chamberlain of the Household
Amanda Milling	Backbench MP	Lord Commissioner of the Treasury
Joy Morrissey	Assistant government whip	Lord Commissioner of the Treasury
Mike Wood	Backbench MP	Lord Commissioner of the Treasury
Lord Gascoigne	Backbench Peer	Lord-in-waiting; Government Whip
Lord Mott	Lord-in-waiting; Government Whip	Left the government
Aaron Bell	Backbench MP	Assistant government whip
Mark Fletcher	Backbench MP	Assistant government whip
Mark Jenkinson	Backbench MP	Assistant government whip
Suzanne Webb	Backbench MP	Assistant government whip
Lord Benyon	Minister of State for Biosecurity, Marine and Rural Affairs	Minister of State for Climate, Environment and Energy
Earl of Minto	Minister of State for Regulatory Reform	Minister of State for Defence
Baroness Vere of Norbiton	Parliamentary Under-Secretary of State for Aviation, Maritime and Security	Parliamentary Secretary in HM Treasury
Lord Davies of Gower	Lord-in-waiting; Government Whip	Parliamentary Under Secretary of State in the Department for Transport
Baroness Penn	Parliamentary Secretary in HM Treasury	Parliamentary Under Secretary of State in the Department for Levelling Up, Housing and Communities
Baroness Goldie	Minister of State for Defence	Left the government
Trudy Harrison	Parliamentary Under-Secretary of State for Natural Environment and Land Use	Resigned from the government
Lord Murray of Blidworth	Parliamentary Under-Secretary of State for Migration and Borders	Left the government
James Davies	Parliamentary Under-Secretary of State for Wales	Left the government
Julie Marson	Assistant government whip	Resigned from the government
Steve Double	Lord Commissioner of the Treasury	Resigned from the government
Sarah Dines	Parliamentary Under-Secretary of State for Safeguarding	Dismissed from the government

== Reaction ==
Reactions to the reshuffle focused to a considerable extent on Cameron's "surprise" return to frontline politics. The Shadow Secretary of State for Work and Pensions Liz Kendall asked the Works and Pensions Secretary Mel Stride about unemployment, saying "it turns out the government can get the over 50s back to work, just only if they are former prime ministers". Addressing the House of Commons during the debate on the King's Speech, the Shadow Health Secretary Wes Streeting asked, "What kind of message does it send their constituents that their own party leader cannot find a suitable candidate for foreign secretary among the 350 Conservative MPs who sit in this House?"

On Twitter, former prime minister Theresa May congratulated Cameron on his appointment as Foreign Secretary, adding that the experience he acquired during his tenure as Prime Minister "will be invaluable at this time of great uncertainty in our world".

Following the cabinet reshuffle, Andrea Jenkyns submitted a public letter of no confidence in Rishi Sunak.
