= Colwyn =

Colwyn may refer to:

== Wales ==
- Colwyn Bay – town in north Wales
- Colwyn (district) – former district and borough in north Wales
- Old Colwyn (formerly called Colwyn) – village in north Wales
- Aberconwy and Colwyn, now Conwy County Borough – county borough in Wales
- Afon Colwyn (River Colwyn) – river in north Wales
- Rhos Bay (also known as Colwyn Bay) – Bay in north Wales
- Colwyn Castle – castle in north Wales
- Colwyn (electoral ward) – electoral district in north Wales
- Colwyn Rural District – former rural district in mid Wales

== Outside Wales ==
- Baron Colwyn – peerage title in the United Kingdom
- Colwyn committee – Northern Ireland committee
- Colwyn, Pennsylvania – borough in Pennsylvania, United States
