= Dominic Johnson, Baron Johnson of Lainston =

British financier politician and life peer (born 1974)

The Right Honourable The Lord Johnson of Lainston CBE
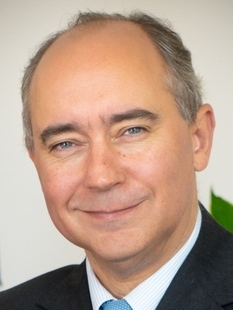

Co-chairman of the Conservative Party
- In office 4 November 2024 – 22 July 2025 Serving with Nigel Huddleston
- Leader: Kemi Badenoch
- Preceded by: Richard Fuller
- Succeeded by: Kevin Hollinrake

Minister of State for Regulatory Reform
- In office 14 November 2023 – 5 July 2024
- Prime Minister: Rishi Sunak
- Preceded by: The Earl of Minto
- Succeeded by: Justin Madders

Minister of State for Investment
- In office 24 November 2022 – 5 July 2024
- Prime Minister: Rishi Sunak
- Preceded by: Himself
- Succeeded by: The Baroness Gustafsson
- In office 2 October 2022 – 28 October 2022
- Prime Minister: Liz Truss; Rishi Sunak
- Preceded by: The Lord Grimstone of Boscobel
- Succeeded by: Himself

Deputy Chairman of the Conservative Party
- In office 17 July 2016 – 26 July 2019 Serving with Anthea McIntyre (2016), James Cleverly (2018–2019), Helen Whately (2019)
- Leader: Theresa May
- Preceded by: Robert Halfon
- Succeeded by: Paul Scully

Member of the House of Lords
- Lord Temporal
- Life peerage 19 October 2022

Personal details
- Born: Dominic Robert Andrew Johnson; 6 April 1974 (age 52) London, England
- Party: Conservative
- Spouse: Hon. Alice Rose Alethea Hamilton (m. 2006)
- Children: 1
- Relatives: Archie Hamilton, Baron Hamilton of Epsom (father-in-law)
- Education: Marlborough College
- Alma mater: Durham University (BA)

Dominic Robert Andrew Johnson, Baron Johnson of Lainston, CBE (born 6 April 1974), is a British financier, hedge fund manager and politician. He is also the co-founder and chief executive officer (CEO) of Somerset Capital Management and chairman of the House of Lords International Agreements Committee. He served as co-chairman of the Conservative Party from November 2024 until July 2025, alongside Nigel Huddleston.

Lord Johnson served under Rishi Sunak as a Minister of State in the Department for Business and Trade and in the Department for International Trade during the prime ministership of Liz Truss. Johnson has given more than £250,000 to the Conservative Party, serving as its vice-chairman from 2016 to 2019.

== Early life ==
Johnson was born in London in 1974, son of Patrick Johnson and Juliet Elizabeth, daughter of Lt Andrew John Craig-Harvey, 5th Royal Inniskilling Dragoon Guards, of Lainston House, Sparsholt, near Winchester, Hampshire, now a hotel. Juliet's mother, Mary, daughter of Royal Navy Captain Robert Bradshaw Wilmot Sitwell, CBE, was a descendant, through her mother, of the Conservative politicians Charles Cocks, 1st Baron Somers and Sir Armine Wodehouse, 5th Bart, MP. Johnson's maternal uncle, Nicholas Craig-Harvey, is married to Lady Julia, a daughter of the Conservative politician Hugh Percy, 10th Duke of Northumberland, and maternal granddaughter of Walter Montagu Douglas Scott, 8th Duke of Buccleuch, who as Earl of Dalkeith sat in the House of Commons. When Johnson was six months old, his mother fatally stabbed his father after an argument over a burnt meal; although two guests attempted to assist him, Patrick Johnson died two days later aged thirty one. Johnson's mother, aged twenty seven, was found guilty of manslaughter on grounds of diminished responsibility, and sent to Rooksdown Hospital in Hampshire; she was subsequently released and later remarried to Dr Ivan Brumpt. Johnson and his older sister were raised by their maternal grandparents.

Johnson was educated at Marlborough College before studying Politics at Collingwood College, Durham, graduating BA in 1995.

== Career ==
Johnson began his career in finance with Robert Fleming & Co. in 1995, and then with Jardine Fleming, Hong Kong, in 1998. In 2001, he went into asset management, and worked for Lloyd George Management until 2007. In 2007, he co-founded Somerset Capital Management (SCM) with Sir Jacob Rees-Mogg and Edward Robertson. All three were colleagues at Lloyd George Management in Hong Kong. Rees-Mogg was CEO of SCM until Johnson succeeded him in 2010.

In September 2022, SCM, with assets under management of about $5 billion, was up for sale, with Johnson planning to move into politics; he was succeeded by Chief Operating Officer, Robert Diggle, as CEO.

== Politics ==
From 2006 to 2010, Johnson served as a Conservative councillor for the Royal Borough of Kensington and Chelsea.

In 2016, Johnson provided accommodation to former prime minister David Cameron which Cameron declared in the MPs' Register of Interests.

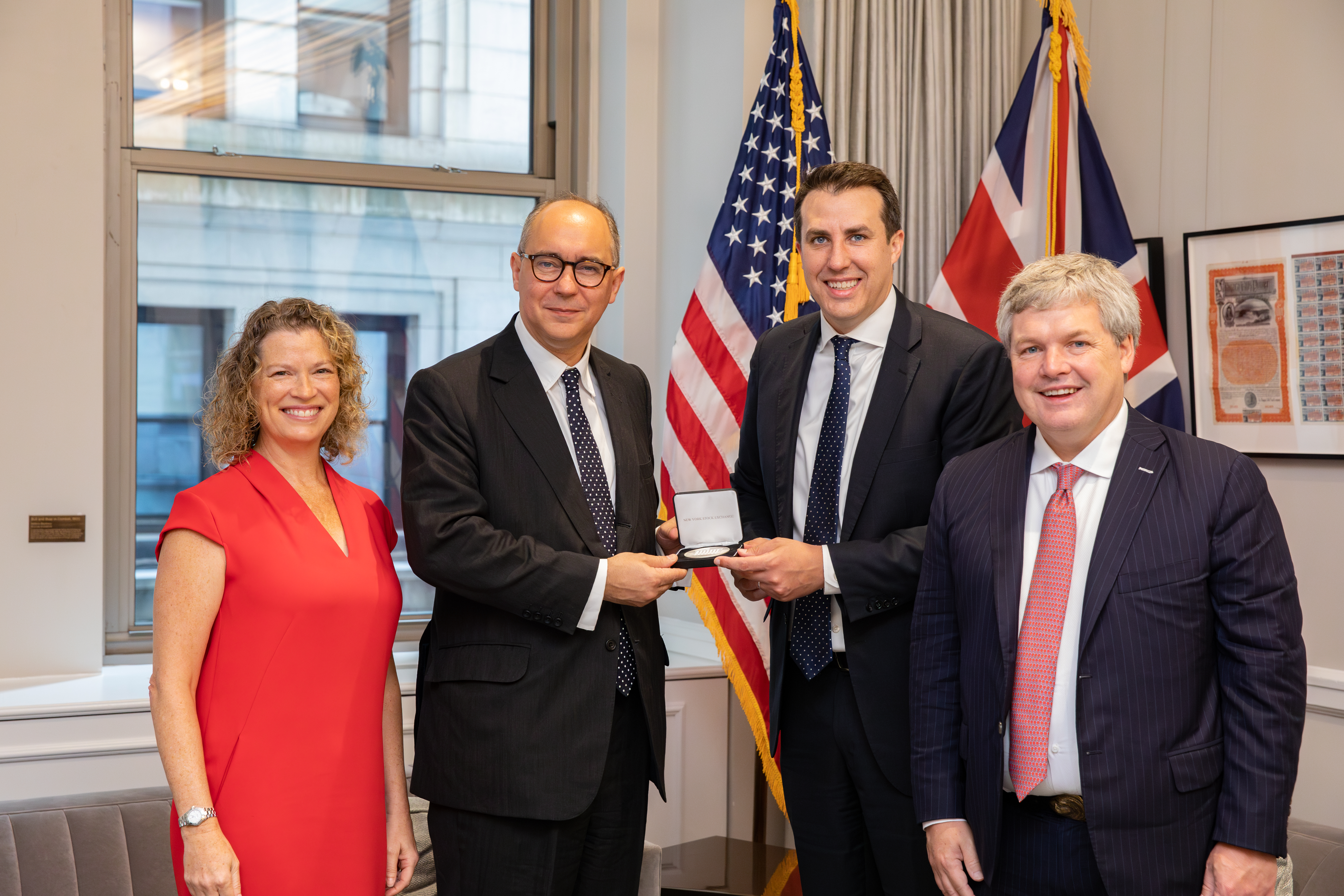
Lord Johnson visiting New York City in July 2023

Johnson has donated more than £250,000 to the Conservative Party, and was its vice-chairman from 2016 to 2019. In the 2017 New Year Honours, Johnson was appointed a Commander of the Order of the British Empire (CBE) "for political service".

On 2 October 2022, Johnson was appointed by Liz Truss as a Minister of State in the Cabinet Office and Minister of State for Investment in the Department for International Trade. Created a Life Peer to facilitate his ministerial role on 19 October 2022, he was introduced in the House of Lords as Baron Johnson of Lainston, of Lainston in the County of Hampshire. The territorial designation "Lainston" derives from his mother's family home, Lainston House, near Winchester in Hampshire, which is now a hotel. Lord Johnson was sacked by Truss's successor, Rishi Sunak, soon after becoming prime minister, then re-appointed as a minister of state for international trade on 24 November 2022.

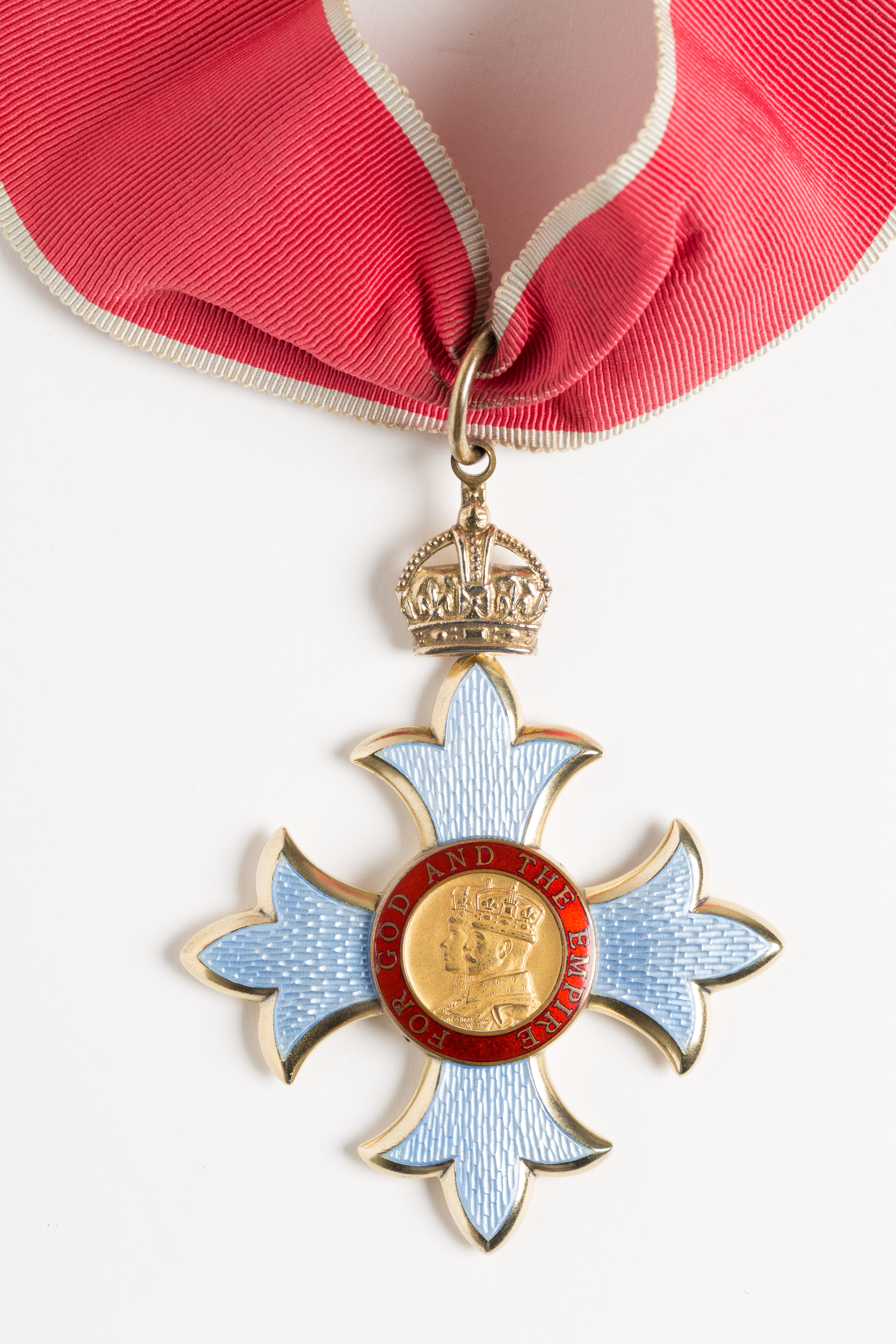
CBE neck decoration

== Personal life ==
In 2006, Johnson married Alice Rose Alethea Hamilton (born 1974), youngest daughter of Archibald Hamilton, Baron Hamilton of Epsom, formerly a Conservative government minister. Johnson also has a son called Victor who was born on 6 May 2010, celebrating a Conservative win.

Political offices
New title	Minister of State for International Trade and the Cabinet Office; 2022	Vacant
Preceded by The Lord Grimstone of Boscobel	Minister of State for Investment; 2022; 2022–2024	Vacant Title next held by Himself
Preceded by Himself	Minister of State for Investment; 2022; 2022–2024	Succeeded by The Baroness Gustafsson
Party political offices
Preceded by Robert Halfon	Deputy Chairman of the Conservative Party; 2016–2019; With: Anthea McIntyre (2016); James Cleverly (2018–2019); Helen Whately (2019)	Succeeded by Paul Scully; Helen Whately
Preceded by Richard Fuller	Chairman of the Conservative Party; 2024–2025; With: Nigel Huddleston	Succeeded by Kevin Hollinrake
Orders of precedence in the United Kingdom
Preceded by The Lord Markham	Gentlemen; Baron Johnson of Lainston	Followed by The Lord Murray of Blidworth
