= Minister of State for Investment =

Ministerial office in the United Kingdom

United Kingdom Minister of State for Investment
- Royal Arms of His Majesty's Government
- Incumbent; Vacant since 21 July 2026
- Department for Business and Trade; HM Treasury
- Style: The Right Honourable (within the UK and Commonwealth)
- Type: Minister of the Crown
- Status: Minister of State
- Member of: His Majesty's Government
- Reports to: Secretary of State for Business and Trade; Chancellor of the Exchequer
- Seat: Westminster
- Nominator: Prime Minister
- Appointer: The Monarch; (on the advice of the Prime Minister)
- Term length: At His Majesty's pleasure
- Salary: £83,048 per annum (2022) (including £86,584 MP salary)

The Minister of State for Investment was a junior ministerial position in His Majesty's Government Department, appointed jointly to the Department of Business and Trade and HM Treasury.

== Responsibilities ==
Responsibilities include:

- Office for Investment
- Investor Relations
- Investment events
- Investment delivery
- Life sciences
- GREAT Board

== Ministers of State for Investment ==
Minister of State	Entered office	Left office	Political party	Ministry
Gerry Grimstone, Baron Grimstone of Boscobel	18 March 2020	7 July 2022	Conservative	Johnson (II)
Dominic Johnson, Baron Johnson of Lainston	2 October 2022	28 October 2022	Conservative	Truss
Dominic Johnson, Baron Johnson of Lainston	24 November 2022	5 July 2024	Conservative	Sunak
Poppy Gustafsson, Baroness Gustafsson	10 October 2024	5 September 2025	Labour	Keir Starmer
Jason Stockwood, Baron Stockwood	6 September 2025	21 July 2026	Labour	Keir Starmer
Merged with Minister of State for Science, Innovation and Investment
