= Anthony Hamilton-Smith, 3rd Baron Colwyn =

British peer, dentist and politician (1942–2024)

The Right Honourable The Lord Colwyn CBE
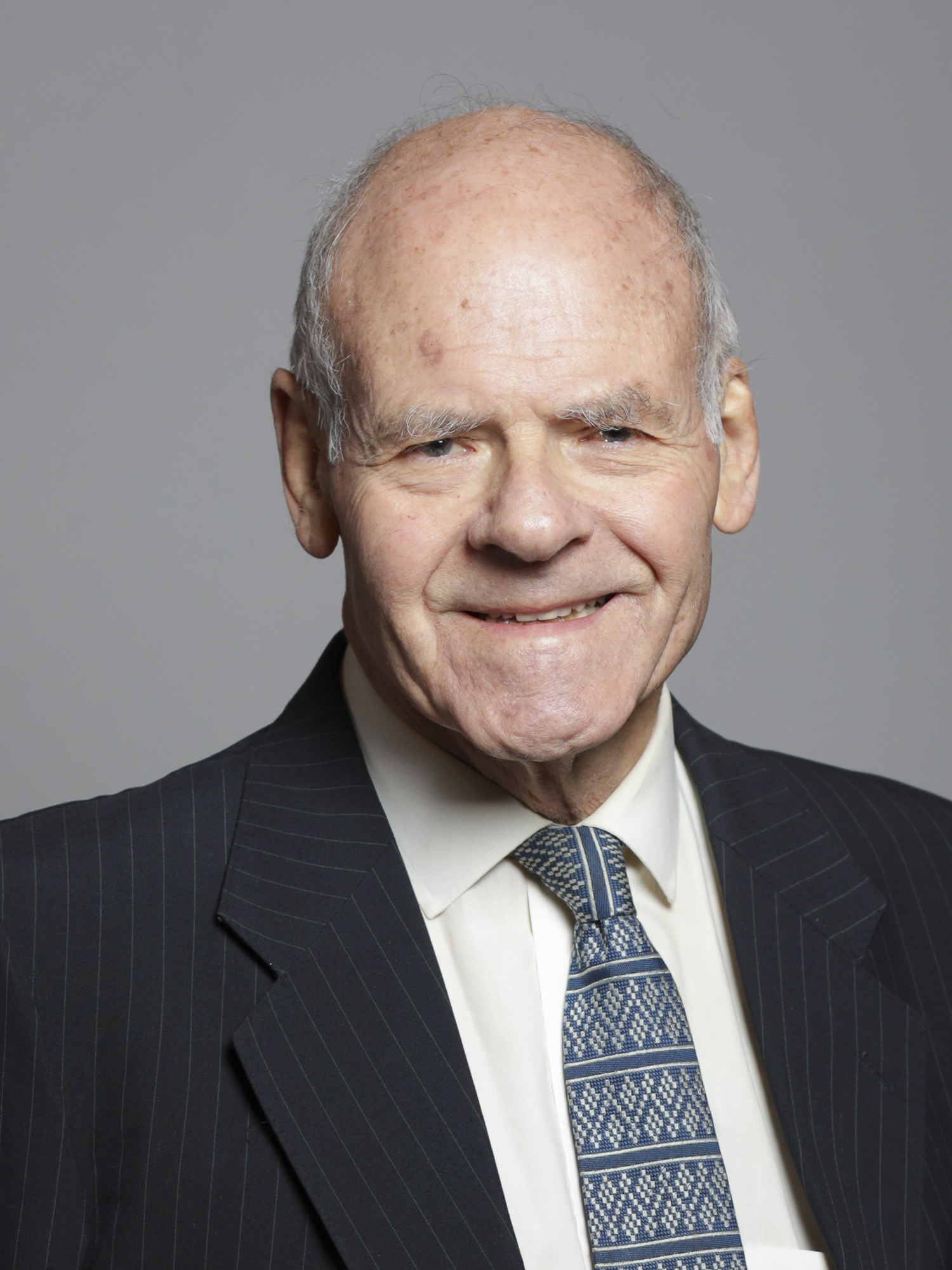
- Official portrait, 2020

Member of the House of Lords
- Lord Temporal
- Hereditary peerage 2 January 1967 – 11 November 1999
- Preceded by: The 2nd Baron Colwyn
- Succeeded by: Seat abolished
- Elected Hereditary Peer; 11 November 1999 – 21 July 2022
- Election: 1999
- Preceded by: Seat established
- Succeeded by: The 7th Earl of Minto

Personal details
- Born: Ian Anthony Hamilton-Smith; 1 January 1942
- Died: 4 August 2024 (aged 82)
- Spouse(s): Sonia Jane Morgan (1964–1976); Nicola Jeanne Tyers (1977–his death)
- Children: 4
- Parent: 2nd Baron Colwyn
- Occupation: Peer, dentist and politician

Ian Anthony Hamilton-Smith, 3rd Baron Colwyn, CBE (1 January 1942 – 4 August 2024), commonly known as Anthony Hamilton-Smith, was a British peer, politician and dentist.

He was one of 90 hereditary peers elected to remain in the House of Lords after the House of Lords Act 1999, sitting as a Conservative.

He retired from the House of Lords on 21 July 2022.

== Early life ==
Ian Anthony Hamilton-Smith was born on 1 January 1942. The son of Miriam Gwendoline Ferguson and the 2nd Baron Colwyn, he was educated at Cheltenham College, at St Bartholomew's Hospital and at the Royal Dental Hospital, graduating in 1966.

== Career ==
Hamilton-Smith graduated from the University of London with a Bachelor of Dental Surgery (BDS) and a Licentiate in Dental Surgery (LDS) in 1966, and became a member of the Royal College of Surgeons of England. In the same year, he succeeded to his father's titles.

He worked as a dentist from 1965 to 2005, and was Chair of the Dental Protection Ltd (a professional support organisation) from 1995 to 2001. He was non-executive director of the Medical Protection Society between 1989 and 2002, and of Project Hope between 1996 and 2001.

In 1998 and 1999, Lord Colwyn was chair of the radiostation Raw FM, and of Banbury Local Radio from 2003 to 2005. From 2005 to 2008 he was chair of Campbell Montague International and of Dental Sedation Practice. Due to commitments at the House of Lords, he stepped down as chairman of Campbell Montague International in 2008.

Lord Colwyn was a member of the Eastman Research Institute Trust from 1990 to 2001. Since 2004, he has been a trustee of the Portman Estate. He was also a Fellow of the Industry and Parliament Trust and a Member of the Royal Society of Medicine. Between 1999 and 2001, he was a Fellow of the Institute of Directors. He was also a vice president of the Blackie Foundation Trust.

From 1988 to 2005, Lord Colwyn was president of the Natural Medicines Society, between 1991 and 1998 of the Huntington's Disease Association and from 1993 and 1998 of the Society for Advancement of Anaesthesia in Dentistry. He was president of the Arterial Health Foundation from 1993 to 2004, of the Metropolitan Branch of the British Dental Association (BDA) in 1994 and 1995, and a council member of the Medical Protection Society from 1994 to 2001. He was invested as a Commander of the Order of the British Empire (CBE) in 1989, and became a Fellow of the British Dental Association in 2005. He was also joint chair of the All Party Parliamentary Jazz Appreciation Group.

== Personal life and death ==
Hamilton-Smith was married twice: first to Sonia Jane Morgan (who died in 2006) in 1964. The couple divorced in 1976, and he married Nicola Jeanne Tyers in 1977.

He had one son, Craig Peter Hamilton-Smith (born 13 October 1968, who succeeded to the title), and one daughter, Jacqueline Jane Hamilton-Smith (married to actor Sean Pertwee), by his first wife. He had two daughters, Kirsten Antonia Hamilton-Smith and Tanya Nicole Hamilton-Smith, by his second wife.

Hamilton-Smith died from complications of COVID-19 on 4 August 2024, at the age of 82.

== Sources ==
- "DodOnline". Archived from the original on 15 December 2006.

Peerage of the United Kingdom
Preceded by Frederick Smith	Baron Colwyn; 1966–2024; Member of the House of Lords (1967–1999)	Succeeded by Craig Peter Hamilton-Smith
Parliament of the United Kingdom
New office created by the House of Lords Act 1999	Elected hereditary peer to the House of Lords under the House of Lords Act 1999; 1999–2022	Succeeded by The Earl of Minto
