= George Taylor (botanist) =

British botanist (1904-1993)

Sir George Taylor, FRS FRSE FLS LLD (15 February 1904, in Edinburgh – 13 November 1993, in Dunbar) was a Scottish botanist.

== Life ==
He was born at 5 West Preston Street, the son of George William Taylor, a painter and decorator, and his wife, Jane Sloan. He was educated at Boroughmuir High School. By 1911, his father had gone into partnership as a tailor, with premises "Taylor and Thomson" at 39 George IV Bridge. George then began private education at George Heriot's School.

He studied Biology at Edinburgh University graduating BSc in 1926. He did field studies in Rhodesia and South Africa 1927/28 and then continued as a postgraduate gaining a DSc in 1928. Following this he immediately obtained a position as an assistant at the British Museum in London. He was co-leader of the East African British Museum Ruwenzori expedition in 1934-35. In 1938 he joined Frank Ludlow and George Sherriff in a trip to Bhutan. Staying at the British Museum for most of his working life he became Deputy Keeper of Botany in 1945 and Keeper in 1950.

In 1933 he was elected a Fellow of the Royal Society of Edinburgh. His proposers were William Wright Smith, William Edgar Evans, Malcolm Wilson and John Macqueen Cowan. He was knighted by Queen Elizabeth II in 1962 and elected a Fellow of the Royal Society of London in 1968.

He was Director of the Royal Botanic Gardens, Kew from 1956 to 1971. During this time (1965 to 1969) he was also responsible for the creation of the Queen's Garden at Kew Palace.

In 1971 he returned to Scotland as Director of the Stanley Smith Horticultural Trust based at Belhaven House near Dunbar. There he was responsible for a radical replanting of the entire garden.

He retired in 1989 and died in Dunbar on 13 November 1993.

== Family ==
He married four times: firstly in 1929 to Alice Helen Pendrich, secondly to Norah English, and thirdly Beryl Walker, Lady Colwyn, daughter of Harvey Walker and widow of Frederick Smith, 2nd Baron Colwyn. Following Lady Colwyn's death in 1967 he married for the final time, June Maitland.

He had two sons by his first marriage.

== Publications ==
- An Account of the Genus Meconopsis (1934) Asiatic Poppies
