= Danny Kruger =

British politician (born 1974)

Danny Kruger MBE MP
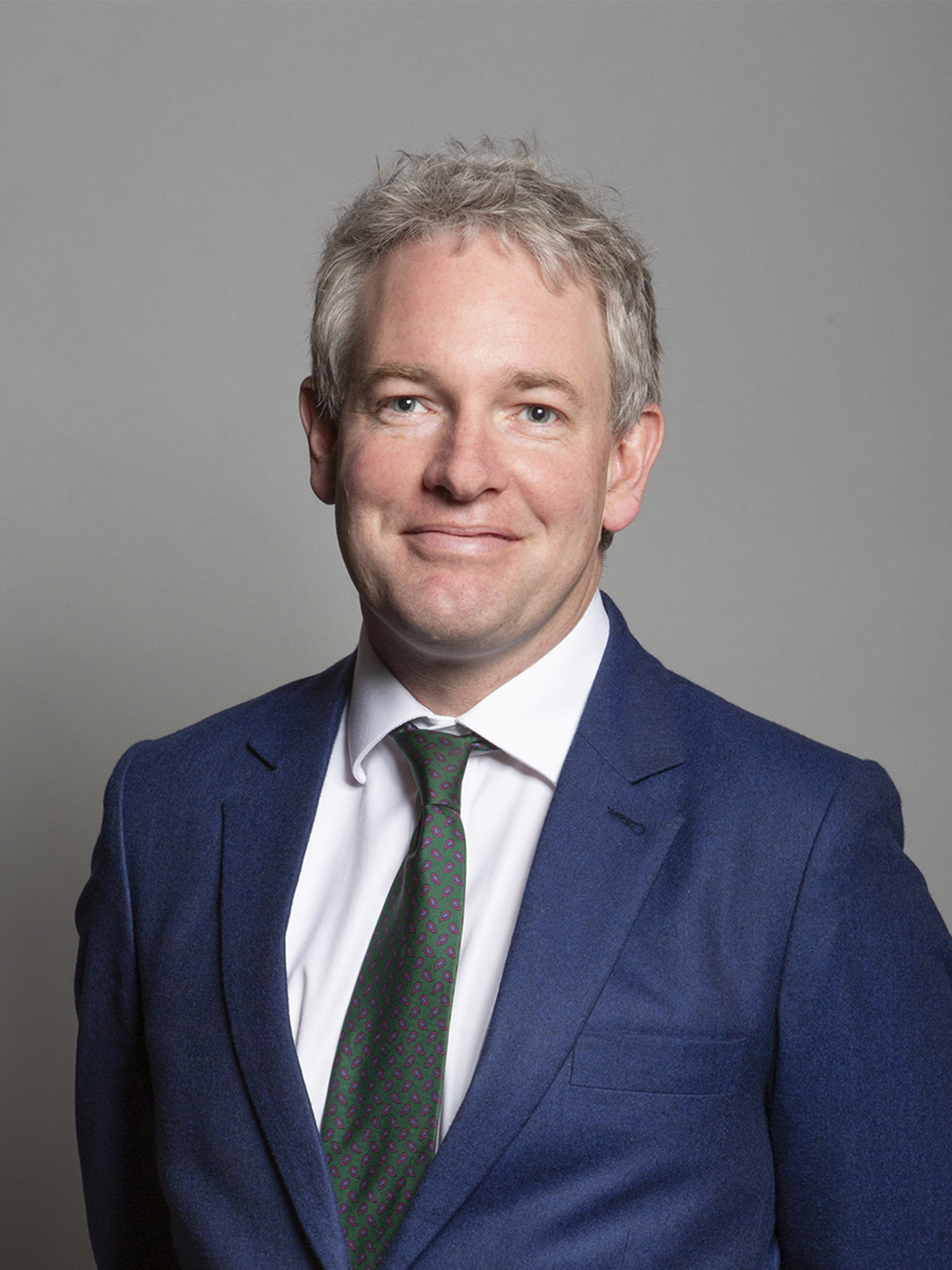
- Official portrait, 2019

Shadow Minister for Work and Pensions
- In office 5 November 2024 – 15 September 2025
- Leader: Kemi Badenoch
- Preceded by: Alison McGovern
- Succeeded by: Andrew Snowden (Note: Office vacant between 15 September 2025 and 2 September 2026)

Shadow Minister for Defence
- In office 19 July 2024 – 5 November 2024
- Leader: Rishi Sunak; Kemi Badenoch
- Preceded by: Luke Pollard
- Succeeded by: Mark Francois

Member of Parliament for East Wiltshire Devizes (2019–2024)
- Incumbent
- Assumed office 12 December 2019
- Preceded by: Claire Perry O'Neill
- Majority: 4,716 (10.0%)

Political Secretary to the Prime Minister of the United Kingdom
- In office 23 July 2019 – 12 December 2019
- Prime Minister: Boris Johnson
- Preceded by: Stephen Parkinson
- Succeeded by: Ben Gascoigne

Personal details
- Born: Daniel Rayne Kruger; 23 October 1974 (age 52) Westminster, London, England
- Party: Reform UK (since 2025)
- Other political affiliations: Conservative (until 2025)
- Children: 3
- Parents: Rayne Kruger (father); Prue Leith (mother)
- Relatives: Sam Leith (cousin)
- Education: University of Edinburgh (MA); University of Oxford (DPhil)

Daniel Rayne Kruger (born 23 October 1974) is a British politician who has been the Member of Parliament (MP) for East Wiltshire, previously Devizes, since 2019. Kruger was elected as a member of the Conservative Party, but defected to Reform UK in September 2025.

The son of writer and property developer Rayne Kruger and restaurateur and television presenter Prue Leith, Kruger was educated at Eton College, subsequently studying history at the University of Edinburgh and University of Oxford. After university, he worked at the conservative Centre for Policy Studies think tank, and then became a policy adviser for the Conservative Party.

Kruger became David Cameron's chief speechwriter in 2006, whilst Cameron was Leader of the Opposition. He left this role two years later to work full-time at a youth crime prevention charity that he had co-founded called Only Connect. For his charitable work, Kruger received an MBE in 2017. He was Prime Minister Boris Johnson's political secretary between August and December 2019. Kruger was Shadow Parliamentary Under-Secretary of State for Work and Pensions from November 2024 until he defected to Reform UK on 15 September 2025.

== Early life and career ==
Daniel Kruger was born on 23 October 1974 in Westminster to South African parents, writer and property developer Rayne Kruger, and restaurateur and television presenter Prue Leith. He was educated at Eton College. Kruger studied history at the University of Edinburgh. While at the university, he was the editor of the magazine Intercourse. He obtained a DPhil in history from the University of Oxford in 2000.

After university, he became the director of research at the centre-right think tank Centre for Policy Studies in 2001. Kruger worked as a policy adviser in the Conservative Party's Policy Unit from 2003 to 2005. During this time, he was credited with contributing to then Conservative Party leader Iain Duncan Smith's speech at the 2003 Conservative Party Conference. In 2005, Kruger became the chief leader writer of The Daily Telegraph.

Kruger was selected as the Conservative candidate for Sedgefield at the 2005 general election, challenging Labour prime minister Tony Blair. He was forced to drop out of the contest after The Guardian quoted him stating that the party had planned "to introduce a period of creative destruction in the public services". Kruger left his position at The Daily Telegraph to become the chief speechwriter to then Conservative Party leader David Cameron in 2006. He wrote Cameron's 2006 address to the think tank Centre for Social Justice, which was later dubbed the "hug-a-hoodie" speech, and was noted as a call to re-brand the party with compassionate conservatism at its core. He defended the policy in 2011 saying that this did not mean the party was "soft on crime".

Kruger co-founded the London-based youth crime prevention charity Only Connect in 2006 and in 2008 left his position as Cameron's chief speechwriter to work full-time for the charity. In 2015, the charity was acquired by Catch22 but continued to operate independently with its own brand. He also founded the charity West London Zone, which aims to provide support to at-risk youth. Kruger was appointed a Member of the Order of the British Empire (MBE) for services to charity in the 2017 Queen's Birthday Honours. In the same year, he voiced his support for the legalisation of cannabis.

Kruger supported Brexit in the 2016 UK EU membership referendum. He was a senior fellow at the pro-Brexit think-tank Legatum Institute, which he left in 2018 to become an adviser at the Department for Digital, Culture, Media and Sport. In August 2019, Kruger became the political secretary to Prime Minister Boris Johnson.

== Parliamentary career ==
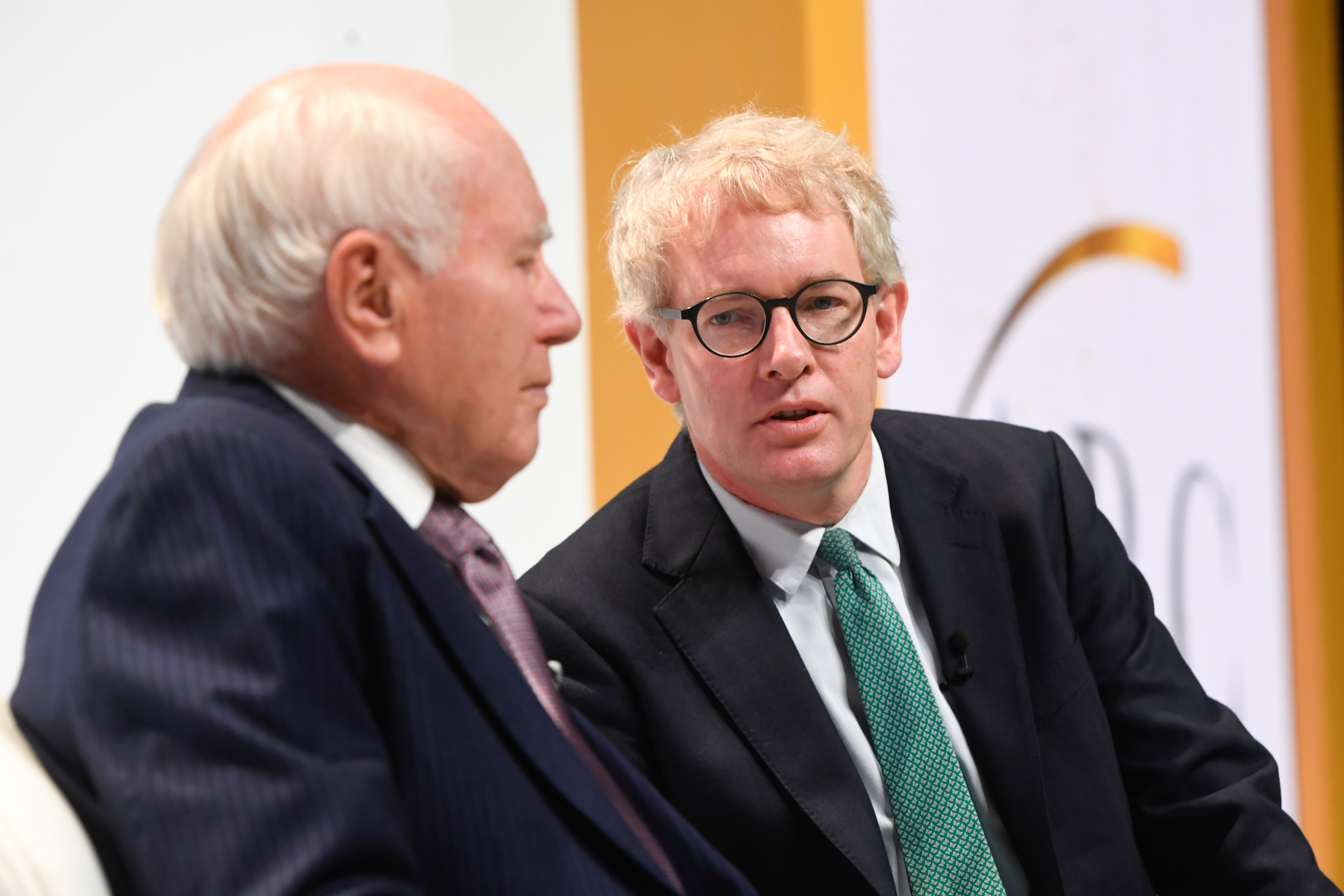
Kruger and John Howard, former Prime Minister of Australia, in 2023

Kruger was selected as a parliamentary candidate for the constituency of Devizes, a safe seat for the Conservative Party, in November 2019. The constituency's incumbent Conservative MP, Claire Perry O'Neill, had previously announced that she would be standing down at the next election to become the president of the 26th United Nations Climate Change Conference, and spend more time with her family.

=== 2019 election ===
Kruger was elected as MP for Devizes at the 2019 general election with 63.1% of the vote and a majority of 23,993 over second-place Liberal Democrat candidate Jo Waltham. After the election, he was replaced as political secretary to the PM by Benjamin Gascoigne, Baron Gascoigne. He made his maiden speech on 29 January 2020, in which he called for a return to Christian values.

During the COVID-19 pandemic, he tweeted extensively in support of the apparent breach of lockdown by Dominic Cummings and Mary Wakefield in 2020, describing them as "old friends". Kruger was photographed breaching the rules on the mandatory wearing of masks on public transport in August 2020; he apologised and stated that he "simply forgot", but also criticised the photographer for not asking him to put on a mask. He referred to his dislike for "absurd masks" in an interview with local media.

He was appointed parliamentary private secretary to the housing secretary Michael Gove in September 2021. He supported Prime Minister Boris Johnson in the 2022 Conservative Party vote of confidence in his leadership in June 2022, stating: "I don't judge people's private morals, or rather I do but I oughtn't. I judge public conduct. And on that, I think we should be forgiving about minor slips". While speaking during a Commons debate the same month on the overturning of Roe v. Wade by the Supreme Court of the United States, which ended the federal right to abortion in the first trimester, he commented that he did not agree "that women have an absolute right to bodily autonomy" in relation to abortion as "in the case of abortion that right is qualified by the fact that another body is involved". He resigned as parliamentary private secretary to the housing secretary on 6 July 2022 when Gove was fired by Johnson as part of the crisis in confidence in Johnson's leadership. He endorsed Suella Braverman during the subsequent leadership election.

At the National Conservatism Conference in May 2023, he commented in a speech that "the only basis for a safe and successful society" was marriage between men and women, that they should stick "together for the sake of the children", and that this should be recognised and rewarded. He also bemoaned what he saw as "the radicalisation of a generation. In the name of a new ideology, a new religion – a mix of Marxism and narcissism and paganism, self-worship and nature-worship all wrapped up in revolution." He defended his views on the Planet Normal podcast, arguing that "I do think that society has been built and can only really prosper if the basis of it is the principle that if you have children with somebody fit, the ideal is that you stick together with that person through the whole of your child's life.... but as I say there are many occasions where that is not possible." Prime Minister Rishi Sunak's spokesman distanced himself from Kruger's remarks on the role of marriage in society. Kruger also defended the use of the phrase "cultural Marxism" by fellow MP Miriam Cates at the same conference.

Kruger said on Sky News in October 2023 that many asylum applicants to the UK were pretending to be gay to increase their chances of remaining. He participated in the inaugural conference of the Alliance for Responsible Citizenship in November 2023. In an interview there he said: "We can tolerate eccentric ideologues. What we can't tolerate is large numbers of people who hate the country that they live in".

=== 2024 election ===
At the 2024 general election, Kruger was reelected to Parliament as MP for East Wiltshire with 35.7% of the vote and a majority of 4,716. He opposed Kim Leadbeater's bill introducing assisted dying into law and served on the committee examining the legislation. He replaced Ben Obese-Jecty on the Work and Pensions Select Committee on 17 March 2025.

=== Defection to Reform ===
On 15 September 2025, Kruger defected from the Conservatives to Reform UK. The same day, he wrote an op-ed in The Times, headlined "The Tories are done, the voters aren’t coming back".

== Political philosophy ==
Kruger has said that his politics are best described as communitarianism. He has cited Alasdair MacIntyre, John Gray, John Milbank, Phillip Blond, Maurice Glasman, Mary Harrington, Adrian Pabst, Roger Scruton, Yoram Hazony, Philip Rieff, Robert D. Putnam, Charles Murray, and Patrick J. Deneen among the influences on his political philosophy.

In his 2023 book Covenant, Kruger outlined his political philosophy in more detail. He argues that the prevailing liberal social contract model should be replaced with what he terms a “covenant” rooted in duty, virtue and mutual dependence. He contrasts two fundamental visions: The Order, which is grounded in tradition, community, hierarchy and transcendent truths, and The Idea, a modern creed of individual self-creation that he believes has weakened the bonds of society. He also critiques progressive ideology, the 20th century sexual revolution, and particularly identity politics, which he describes as a form of secular religion that elevates the self above shared responsibilities and undermines the institutions that sustain families and local communities.

Drawing on classical and Christian traditions, Kruger argues that modern liberalism, with its emphasis on individual autonomy and free-market primacy, has weakened social bonds and eroded a sense of collective responsibility. He contends that political institutions should support the family, community and national identity as the foundations of a healthy society. Kruger proposes policies aimed at strengthening these covenantal relationships, including measures to promote marriage and family life, decentralise public services and encourage local self-governance. He also advocates for an economy that recognises work as a vocation tied to place and community, supported by regional banking and apprenticeship schemes.

Kruger has expressed support for the decriminalisation of psilocybin. In The Times in September 2025, Kruger gave his reasons for leaving the Conservatives, including "I'm leaving because I think the party is over." In February 2026, Kruger stated that Britain has a "totally unregulated sexual economy", and that a Reform government would seek a "limited but important role" in "resetting" Britain's sexual behaviour and reversing the 1960s sexual revolution.

== Personal life ==
Kruger is married to Emma, a former teacher. When they met, Emma was an evangelical Christian, and Kruger later converted to her faith. They have three children. They are both co-founders of the charity Only Connect. Kruger was fined £120 after his Jack Russell Terrier puppy caused a stampede when it chased a herd of 200 deer in London's Richmond Park in March 2021. Kruger apologised and said he would be more careful in future.

== Bibliography ==
- Kruger, Danny (2007). On Fraternity. Civitas. ISBN 978-1903386576. Considers the politics of the early 21st century.
- Kruger, Danny (2023). Covenant: The New Politics of Home, Neighbourhood and Nation. Forum Press. ISBN 978-1800752115. Sets out Kruger's political thinking.

== Notes ==
Parliament of the United Kingdom
Preceded by Claire Perry O'Neill	Member of Parliament for Devizes; 2019–2024	Constituency abolished
New constituency	Member of Parliament for East Wiltshire; 2024–present	Incumbent
Government offices
Preceded by Stephen Parkinson	Political Secretary to the Prime Minister; 2019	Succeeded by Benjamin Gascoigne
