= Timothy Elliot-Murray-Kynynmound, 7th Earl of Minto =

British peer

The Right Honourable The Earl of Minto
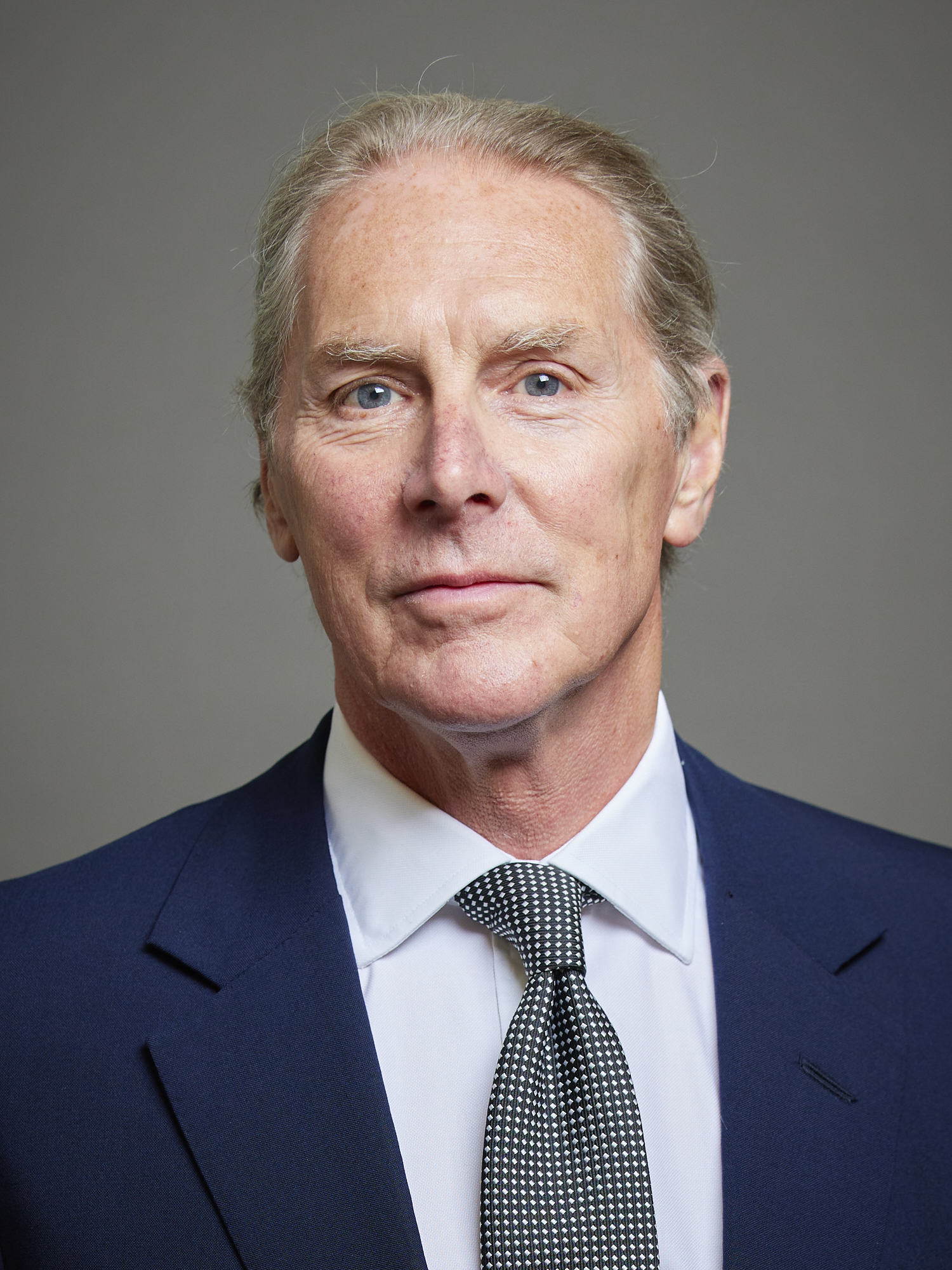
- Official portrait, 2023

Shadow Minister for Defence
- Incumbent
- Assumed office 1 September 2024
- Leader: Rishi Sunak; Kemi Badenoch
- Preceded by: The Lord Coaker

Minister of State for Defence
- In office 14 November 2023 – 5 July 2024
- Prime Minister: Rishi Sunak
- Preceded by: The Baroness Goldie
- Succeeded by: The Lord Coaker

Minister of State for Regulatory Reform
- In office 27 March 2023 – 13 November 2023
- Prime Minister: Rishi Sunak
- Preceded by: Office established
- Succeeded by: The Lord Johnson of Lainston

Member of the House of Lords Lord Temporal
- Incumbent
- Life peerage 17 June 2026
- Elected Hereditary Peer; 25 October 2022 – 29 April 2026
- By-election: 2022
- Preceded by: The 3rd Baron Colwyn
- Succeeded by: Seat abolished

Personal details
- Born: 1 December 1953 (age 72)
- Party: Conservative
- Spouse: Diana Barbara Trafford (m. 1983)
- Children: 4
- Parents: Gilbert Elliot-Murray-Kynynmound, 6th Earl of Minto; Lady Caroline Child Villiers

Gilbert Timothy George Lariston Elliot-Murray-Kynynmound, 7th Earl of Minto, Baron Minto of Burncrooks (/kɪˈnɪnmənd/; born 1 December 1953), styled Viscount Melgund between 1975 and 2005, is a British hereditary peer, businessman, and Conservative member of the House of Lords. He was previously the chief executive of British stationery company Paperchase. He is a descendant of King Henry VII of England.

== Early life and family ==
He is the son of the late Gilbert Elliot-Murray-Kynynmound, 6th Earl of Minto and his first wife, Lady Caroline Child Villiers. Lord Minto resides in Minto in Roxburghshire.

He succeeded his father in the earldom on 7 September 2005. His father's estate has been the subject of a dispute between Lord Minto and his father's third wife.

He was an officer in the Scots Guards from 1972 to 1976.

On 30 July 1983, he married Diana Barbara Trafford, daughter of Brian and Audrey (née Taylor) Trafford. They have two sons and one daughter; a second son is deceased.

== House of Lords ==
Lord Minto became a member of the House of Lords in October 2022, having finished second in a by-election to replace both the Viscount Ullswater and the Baron Colwyn.

On 27 March 2023, Lord Minto was appointed Minister of State in the Department for Business and Trade and served in that role until 14 November 2023 when he was appointed Minister of State for Defence. He was appointed Shadow Minister for Defence under Rishi Sunak, and was reappointed by Kemi Badenoch.

In May 2026, it was announced that he was to be given one of 26 new life peerages, returning him to the House of Lords after the coming into force of the House of Lords (Hereditary Peers) Act 2026.

== Arms ==
Coat of arms of Timothy Elliot-Murray-Kynynmound, 7th Earl of Minto
Crest A dexter arm embowed issuant from clouds, throwing a dart, all proper.. Escutcheon Quarterly : 1st and 4th grand quarters, quarterly; 1st and 4th, argent, a hunting-horn sable, stringed gules, in the dexter chief point a crescent of the last ; on a chief wavy azure, three mullets of the field (Murray of Melgund) ; 2nd and 3rd, azure, a chevron argent, between three fleurs-de-lis or (Kynynmound of that ilk) ; 2nd and 3rd grand quarters, gules, on a bend engrailed or, a baton azure, within a bordure vair (Elliot, of Minto) ; over all, a chief of augmentation argent, charged with a Moor's head couped in profile proper., being the arms of Corsica. Supporters Dexter, an Indian sheep, sinister, a fawn, all proper. Motto Non eget arcu (He needs not the bow); Below: Suaviter et fortiter (Mildy and firmly).

== Children ==
- Gilbert Francis Elliot-Murray-Kynynmound, Viscount Melgund (b. 1984)
- The Hon. Lorne David Elliot-Murray-Kynynmound (b. & d. 1986)
- The Hon. Michael Timothy Elliot-Murray-Kynynmound (b. 1987)
- Lady Clare Patricia Elliot-Murray-Kynynmound (b. 1991)

Political offices
New title	Minister of State for Business and Trade; 2023	Succeeded by TBC
Preceded by The Baroness Goldie	Minister of State for Defence; 2023–2024	Succeeded by The Lord Coaker
Parliament of the United Kingdom
Preceded by The Lord Colwyn	Elected hereditary peer to the House of Lords under the House of Lords Act 1999; 2022–2026	Position abolished under the House of Lords (Hereditary Peers) Act 2026
Peerage of the United Kingdom
Preceded by Gilbert Elliot-Murray-Kynynmound	Earl of Minto; 2005–present	Incumbent
