= Covenant: The New Politics of Home, Neighbourhood and Nation =

2023 book by Danny Kruger

- Author: Danny Kruger
- Language: English
- Subjects: Political philosophy; History
- Publisher: Forum Press
- Publication date: 7 September 2023
- Publication place: United Kingdom
- Media type: Print, digital, audiobook
- Pages: 192 (hardcover); 144 (ebook)
- ISBN: 978-1800752115 978-1800752115

Covenant: The New Politics of Home, Neighbourhood and Nation is a book by British politician Danny Kruger, published in 2023. The book presents Kruger's vision for a renewed social contract in the United Kingdom, emphasizing the importance of community, localism, and national identity. Drawing from his experiences as a Member of Parliament and advisor to various political figures, Kruger advocates for policies that strengthen the bonds between individuals and their communities. He critiques modern liberalism and individualism, arguing that they have eroded social cohesion and contributed to societal fragmentation.

Kruger proposes a "covenant" approach, which he defines as a commitment to mutual responsibility and shared values among citizens. This approach seeks to balance personal freedom with social duty, advocating for policies that support family life, local economies, and civic institutions. Throughout the book, Kruger discusses practical measures to foster a sense of belonging and purpose, such as reforming welfare systems, empowering local governance, and promoting national pride.

== Critical reception ==
The book received generally positive reviews from critics, with praise being directed towards the Kruger's analysis of Britain's social ills, with some criticism that the book does not adequately propose practical solutions to the problems diagnosed. The New Statesman has noted the influence of Communitarian philosopher Alasdair MacIntyre, theologian John Milbank, and conservative philosopher Roger Scruton on the book's themes and ideas.

The Sunday Times' Charlotte Ivers wrote that "Against a backdrop of boring and technocratic politics, it is uplifting to see a frontline politician setting out a vision of such scope and ideological coherence. Covenant is both persuasively argued and elegant to read, something that can’t be said for many politicians’ offerings. But could it be implemented?" The Daily Telegraph's Charles Moore praised the book as "valuable for identifying the root of so much unhappiness about Britain today. He thinks hard about what people really want. He organises his thought around the simple things for individual, family, and nation – 'somewhere to live, something to do and someone to love'." The Critic also praised the book, concluding in its review that the book is "an eloquent and learned account of why Conservatives should hope they win next time. It’s a glorious roar against the “long defeat” the complacent party is facing. Kruger demolishes the social contract for not summing up custom but instead being a mere idea. Love, life, death and sex are in this book: I’d pay actual money for it." Salma Shah, writing for PoliticsHome, was more critical, writing that "Whilst his diagnosis of the problems of the state is prescient, with criticisms of local government “cliques and cabals” unable to engage people in their local decisions, it lacks any clear pathway to rectifying them. The book is good at pointing out what is not working in the social contract but provides little on how to fix it." Premier Christianity praised the book for calling for a reintroduction of Judeo-Christian ethics into government policy.
