= Benjamin Gascoigne, Baron Gascoigne =

British political adviser (born 1983)

The Right Honourable The Lord Gascoigne
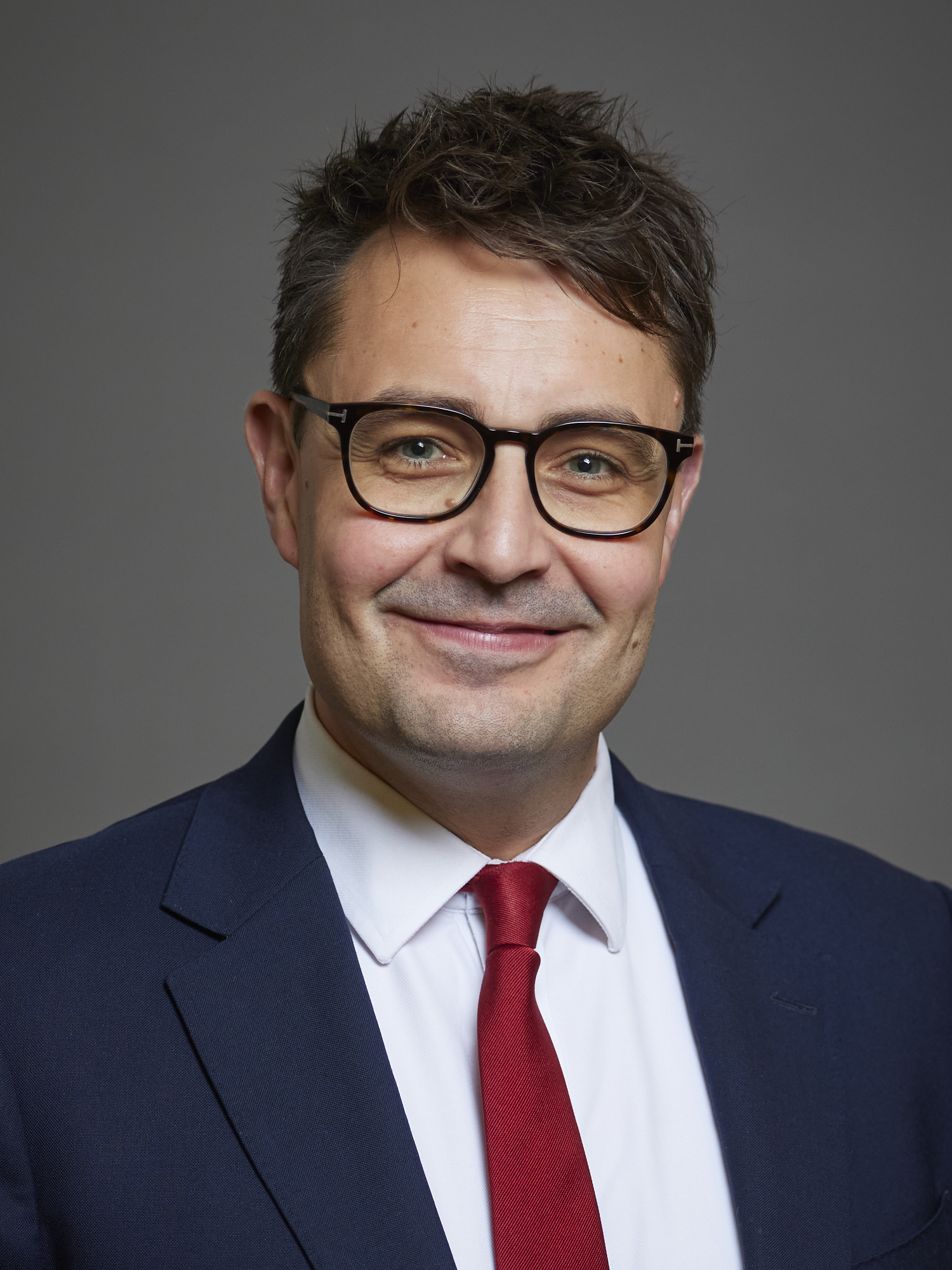
- Official portrait, 2023

Lord-in-Waiting Government Whip
- In office 14 November 2023 – 5 July 2024
- Prime Minister: Rishi Sunak

Member of the House of Lords
- Lord Temporal
- Life peerage 10 July 2023

Political Secretary to the Prime Minister of the United Kingdom
- In office 2019–2020
- Prime Minister: Boris Johnson
- Preceded by: Danny Kruger
- Succeeded by: Declan Lyons

Personal details
- Born: Benjamin Alexander Gascoigne; 5 March 1983 (age 43)
- Party: Conservative
- Education: Nelson and Colne College
- Alma mater: University of Hull
- Occupation: Special adviser

Benjamin Alexander Gascoigne, Baron Gascoigne (born 5 March 1983) is a British political adviser and life peer. He served as Political Secretary to the Prime Minister of the United Kingdom from 2019 to 2020 and the deputy chief of staff to Prime Minister Boris Johnson from 2021 to 2022. Gascoigne had also been his private secretary when Johnson was Mayor of London, and also served as an adviser when Johnson was Foreign Secretary.

He was given a life peerage in the 2022 Prime Minister's Resignation Honours.

== Biography ==
Gascoigne was educated at Nelson and Colne College, a further education college in Nelson, Lancashire, where he studied A-levels in politics, history and English language. He studied politics at the University of Hull.

Following graduation, Gascoigne worked at Pendle Community Credit Union for two years. He then took a job at Conservative Campaign Headquarters, before working on Boris Johnson's campaign to become Mayor of London in 2008.

From 2009 to 2015, Gascoigne was private secretary to Johnson when he was Mayor of London. He worked on Johnson's campaign to be elected member of parliament for Uxbridge and South Ruislip in the 2015 General Election. He was then a special adviser to Johnson when he was Foreign Secretary from 2016 to 2018. In 2019, he briefly left politics: he worked at Grayling, a PR company, as a director in its public affairs team. From December 2019 to 2021, he served as Political Secretary to the Prime Minister of the United Kingdom; to Johnson when he was Prime Minister. Then, from 2021 to 2022, he was deputy chief of staff at 10 Downing Street.

=== House of Lords ===
In 2023, Gascoigne was nominated for a life peerage by Johnson in his delayed resignation honours. He was created Baron Gascoigne, of Pendle in the County of Lancashire, on 10 July, and was introduced to the House of Lords on 18 July. He sits in the Lords for the Conservative Party. He made his maiden speech on 13 November 2023 during the debate following the 2023 King's Speech.

In Prime Minister Rishi Sunak's November 2023 cabinet reshuffle, Gascoigne was appointed a lord-in-waiting and junior government whip in the Lords.

Government offices
Preceded by Danny Kruger	Political Secretary to the Prime Minister; 2019–2020	Succeeded by Declan Lyons
Orders of precedence in the United Kingdom
Preceded by The Lord Mott	Gentlemen; Baron Gascoigne	Followed by The Lord Bailey of Paddington
