= Frederick Smith, 2nd Baron Colwyn =

British Baron

The Right Honourable The Lord Colwyn

Member of the House of Lords Lord Temporal
- In office 19 April 1955 – 29 May 1966; Hereditary Peerage
- Preceded by: The 1st Lord Colwyn
- Succeeded by: The 3rd Lord Colwyn

Personal details
- Born: 26 November 1914
- Died: 29 May 1966 (aged 51)

Frederick John Vivian "Ian" Smith, 2nd Baron Colwyn (26 November 1914 – 29 May 1966) was the son of the Honourable Frederick Henry Smith, and grandson of Frederick Smith, 1st Baron Colwyn. He was educated at Malvern College. He was a stockbroker and during World War II a lieutenant of the 2nd Battalion, Gordon Highlanders. He sustained an injury during his military service.

On 26 January 1946 he inherited the barony from his grandfather. On 4 December 1947, Lord Colwyn appeared in a military court in London and pleaded guilty to five charges of gross impropriety with Italian men at the Isle of Ischia and at Turin. He was sentenced to be cashiered and subsequently left the army on 16 December. Lord Colwyn took his seat in the House of Lords on 19 April 1955.

He married three times: firstly, in 1940, to Miriam Gwendoline Ferguson, who testified to his moral character at his court martial. They divorced in 1951. Secondly, in 1952, to Hermoine Sophia O'Bryen Hoare. They divorced in 1954. Thirdly, in 1955 to Beryl Reddington. His last wife Beryl remarried in 1969 to the botanist, George Taylor.

With his first wife he had a son Ian Anthony who succeeded to the title on the death of his father in 1966.

Peerage of the United Kingdom
Preceded by Frederick Henry Smith	Baron Colwyn; 1914–1966	Succeeded by Anthony Hamilton-Smith
