= Nelson and Colne College =

College in Lancashire, UK

NCC
- Established: 1972
- Administrative staff: 30
- Students: 1,650
- Location: Colne and Nelson, Lancashire, England, UK
- Website: www.nelson.ac.uk

Nelson & Colne College is a further education college in the town of Nelson, Lancashire, North West of England, providing further education to Pendle and the surrounding districts. It is a tertiary college, offering courses to post-16 students, adult learners and those in employment looking to gain new or additional qualifications.

== History ==
Founded during the reorganisation of education in Pendle in the early 1970s, Nelson & Colne College was created by a merger of a number of local sixth forms. Since then the college has grown in size, currently serving the educational needs of around 2,400 full-time students and 10-15,000 part-time students, depending on the time of year.

The college merged with Accrington & Rossendale College on 30 November 2018.

== Courses ==
The college offers courses including GCSEs and A Levels, in addition to vocational accreditations such as NVQs and National Diplomas. The college also works with local companies to provide training for apprenticeships and trainees, using funding including the government's Train to Gain initiative.

The college offers both day and evening classes. In addition to traditional academic subjects such as English, Maths, Sociology, Psychology, Languages, History and Science, there are courses in Beauty Therapy, Hairdressing, Engineering, IT, Drama, Media and Music Technology.

Professional qualifications such as Teaching Assistant and AAT Qualifications (Association of Accounting Technicians) can be obtained at the college and more unusual courses such as Horticulture, Urdu, Pottery and Website Design are offered.

== Facilities ==
In addition to the Learning Resource Centre, there is an internet café, a common room, a fitness centre and a dining hall.

== New Build ==
In order to amalgamate the college onto one campus, Nelson & Colne College gained funding of over £20 million, which allowed for the provision of new buildings and refurbishment of some existing facilities.

Facilities include a sports hall large enough to accommodate six tennis courts and a fitness centre. There are also hairdressing and beauty therapy salons with modern resources allowing students to offer commercial treatments.

In addition to these new buildings, the remainder of the college has also undergone a transformation, with new dining and social areas including a cybercafé, specialist facilities for students requiring additional support, refurbished science laboratories. The engineering workshops have also been refitted. The central concourse between the main building and the Pendle and Deerstone buildings is currently in the process of renovation, expanding the library and its computer facilities whilst providing more seating for students on a lunch time (the new build will mostly be glass). The grounds to the rear of the college are also being renovated with the addition of a large AstroTurf pitch to further improve sporting facilities, the car park will also be extended.

== Alumni ==
- Rachel Brown - International footballer
- Steven Burke - Olympic cyclist for Great Britain
- Jessica Forrest - Actress (who played Leanne Holiday in Hollyoaks)
- Benjamin Gascoigne – political advisor and Conservative life peer
- Julia Haworth - Actress (who played Claire Peacock in ITV's Coronation Street)
- Thomas Morrison - Actor (who played the role of Hooper in the recent adaptation of Brideshead Revisited)
- Andrew Scarborough - actor who starred as Tim Drewe in Downton Abbey.
- Phil Woolas - M.P.
