= Poppy Gustafsson, Baroness Gustafsson =

British businesswoman (born 1982)

The Right Honourable The Baroness Gustafsson CBE
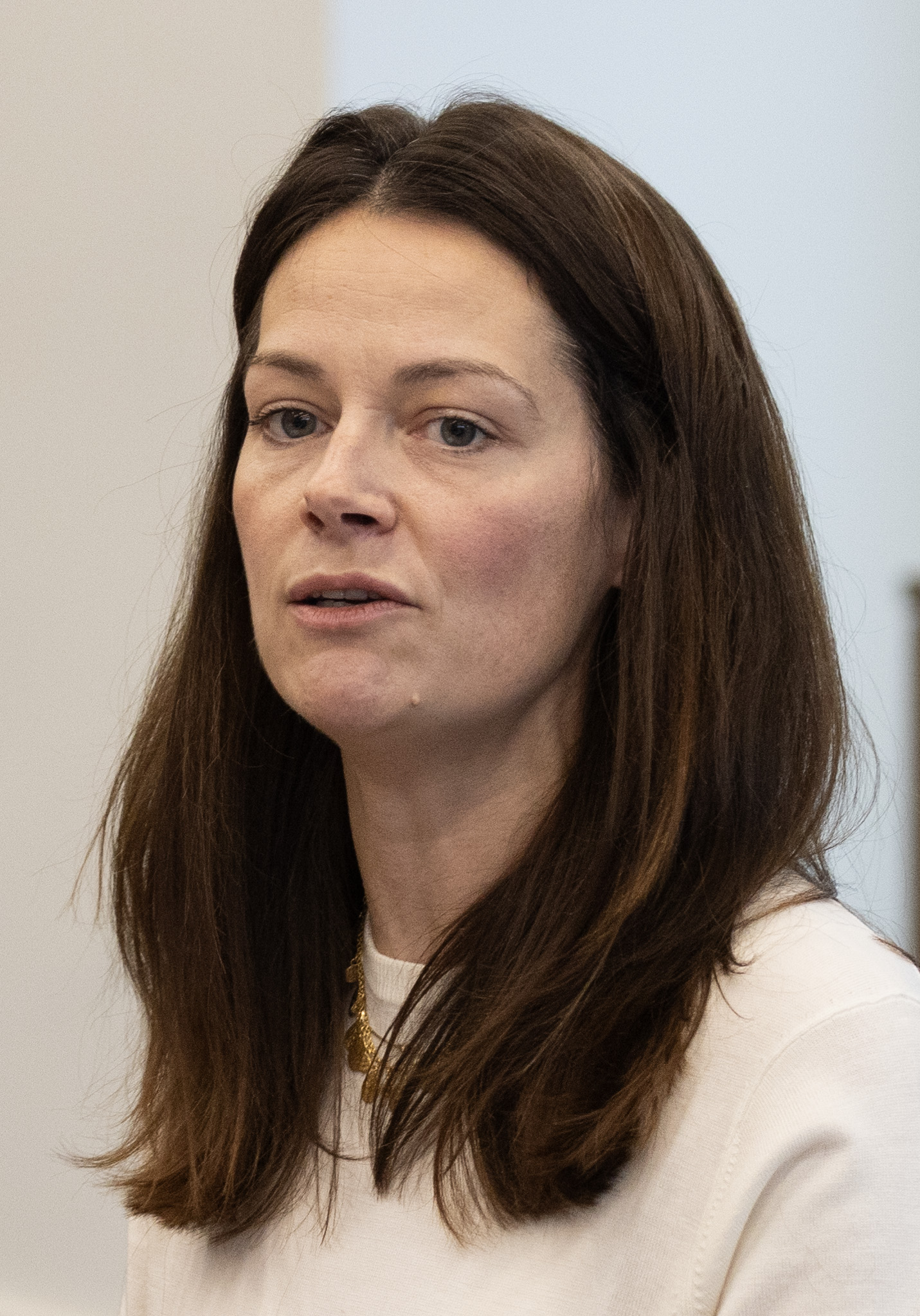
- Gustafsson in 2024

Minister of State for Investment
- In office 10 October 2024 – 5 September 2025
- Prime Minister: Keir Starmer
- Preceded by: The Lord Johnson of Lainston
- Succeeded by: The Lord Stockwood

Member of the House of Lords
- Lord Temporal
- Life peerage 15 November 2024

Personal details
- Born: Poppy Clare Veronica Prentis; 24 August 1982 (age 44) Huntingdon, Cambridgeshire, England
- Party: Labour
- Spouse: Joel Gustafsson (m. 2008)
- Children: 2
- Education: Hinchingbrooke School
- Alma mater: University of Sheffield (BSc)

Poppy Clare Veronica Gustafsson, Baroness Gustafsson, CBE (née Prentis; born 24 August 1982), is a British businesswoman and Labour Party life peer who served as Minister of State for Investment from 2024 to 2025.

== Early life and education ==
Gustafsson was born Poppy Clare Veronica Prentis on 24 August 1982 in Huntingdon, to John and Gilly Prentis. Her father ran an agricultural-sales business, and her mother was a journalist for Farmers Weekly. Growing up in Huntingdon, Cambridgeshire, she attended Hinchingbrooke School. She gained a Bachelor of Science (BSc) degree in mathematics from the University of Sheffield in 2003 before studying for an accountancy qualification at Deloitte, qualifying as a chartered accountant in 2006.

== Career ==
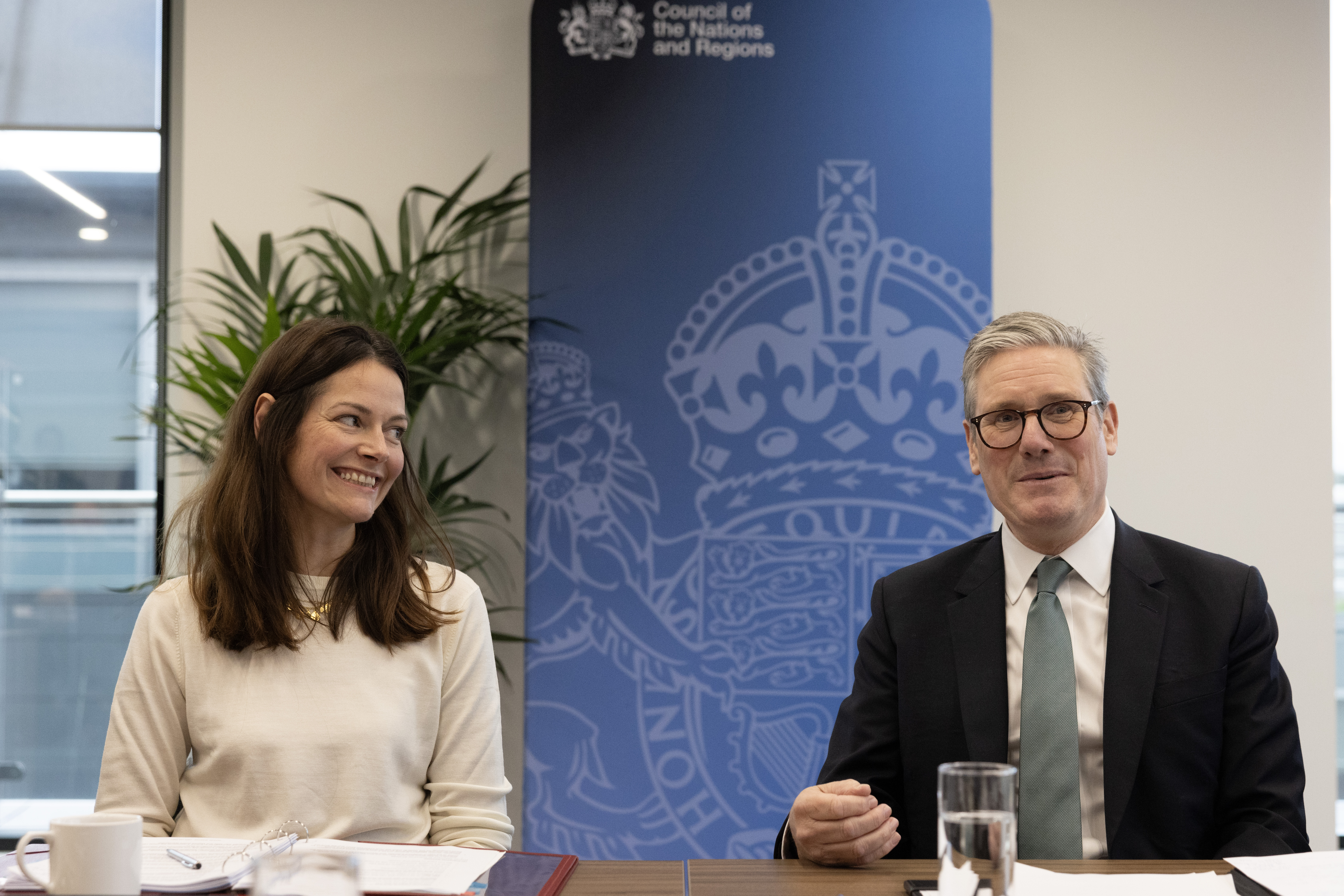
Gustafsson with Prime Minister Keir Starmer at the Council of the Nations and Regions in 2024

In her early career, Gustafsson worked for the venture capital firm Amadeus Capital Partners. In 2009, she moved to Autonomy, working as a corporate controller until the company's acquisition by HP.

Gustafsson co-founded Darktrace in 2013 and initially held the position of chief financial officer. She subsequently took on the role of co-chief executive in 2016 and became the sole CEO in 2020. She led Darktrace's initial public offering in 2021, and left the company in 2024 prior to the completion of its sale to the private equity firm Thoma Bravo.

On 10 October 2024, Gustafsson was appointed to the government as Minister of State for Investment by Prime Minister Sir Keir Starmer. She was created a life peer as Baroness Gustafsson, of Chesterton in the City of Cambridge, on 15 November to allow her to sit in the House of Lords.

On 5 September 2025, Gustafsson resigned as Minister, on the same day as Angela Rayner. Her position was reassigned in the 2025 British cabinet reshuffle.

== Personal life ==
In 2008, Gustafsson married Roland Joel Gustafsson, a Swedish engineer; they have two daughters. She took her husband's surname after the birth of her eldest daughter. She lives in Cambridge as of 2020.

== Honours and awards ==
Gustafsson was appointed Officer of the Order of the British Empire (OBE) in the 2019 Birthday Honours for services to the cyber security industry, She was promoted to Commander of the Order of the British Empire (CBE) in the 2025 New Year Honours.

At the 2019 UK Tech Awards, Gustafsson was named Tech Businesswoman of the Year. In 2022, she was awarded an honorary Doctor of Science (Hon DSc) degree by the University of Sheffield, her alma mater.
