= Minister of State for Regulatory Reform =

United Kingdom Minister of State for Regulatory Reform
- Royal Arms of His Majesty's Government
- Incumbent; Vacant since 5 July 2024
- Department for Business and Trade
- Style: The Right Honourable (within the UK and Commonwealth)
- Type: Minister of the Crown
- Status: Minister of State
- Member of: His Majesty's Government
- Reports to: Secretary of State for Business and Trade
- Seat: Westminster
- Nominator: Prime Minister
- Appointer: The Monarch (on the advice of the Prime Minister)
- Term length: At His Majesty's pleasure
- Salary: £83,048 per annum (2022)

The Minister of State for Regulatory Reform is a role in the Department for Business and Trade of His Majesty's Government. It has been held by The Lord Johnson of Lainston since November 2023.

== Responsibilities ==
Responsibilities include:

- cross-government regulatory reform
- better regulation
- Lords business legislation
- all Private Members Bills
- corporate issues
- Regulatory Policy Committee

== Ministers of State for Regulatory Reform ==
Minister of State	Entered office	Left office	Political party	Ministry
The Earl of Minto	27 March 2023	14 November 2023	Conservative	Sunak
The Lord Johnson of Lainston	14 November 2023	5 July 2024	Conservative	Sunak
