= Frederick Smith, 1st Baron Colwyn =

British baron

The Right Honourable The Lord Colwyn PC DL JP
- Lord Colwyn in 1930

Member of the House of Lords Lord Temporal
- In office 4 June 1917 – 26 January 1946; Hereditary Peerage
- Preceded by: Peerage created
- Succeeded by: The 2nd Lord Colwyn

Personal details
- Born: 24 January 1859
- Died: 26 January 1946 (aged 87)
- Political party: Liberal

Frederick Henry Smith, 1st Baron Colwyn PC DL JP (24 January 1859 – 26 January 1946), known as Sir Frederick Smith, 1st Baronet, from 1912 to 1917, was a British manufacturer, investor and banking executive. He was an influential Liberal figure in Manchester politics for many years.

Smith was a rubber and cotton factory owner, deputy chairman of Martins Bank (which 23 years after his death with 700 branches was acquired by Barclays Bank) and a director of several railway companies. In 1917 he served as Sheriff of Caernarvonshire. He was created a Baronet, of Colwyn Bay in the County of Denbigh, in 1912. In the 1917 Birthday Honours he was raised to the peerage as Baron Colwyn, of Colwyn Bay in the County of Denbigh. In 1924, he was admitted to the Privy Council. He was also a president of Colwyn Bay Football Club.

Lord Colwyn married Elizabeth Anne, daughter of Hamilton Savage, in 1882. They had two sons and five daughters. She died in 1945. Colwyn died in January 1946, aged 87. His eldest son predeceased him, and the barony was inherited by Lord Colwyn's grandson Frederick.

He set up a committee on National Debt and Taxation in Great Britain, as well as a committee on Northern Ireland finances.

== See also ==
- Colwyn committee

Peerage of the United Kingdom
New creation	Baron Colwyn; 1917–1946	Succeeded by Frederick John Vivian Smith
Baronetage of the United Kingdom
New creation	Baronet (of Colwyn Bay); 1912–1946	Succeeded by Frederick John Vivian Smith
