= Gerry Grimstone, Baron Grimstone of Boscobel =

British businessman (born 1949)

The Right Honourable The Lord Grimstone of Boscobel
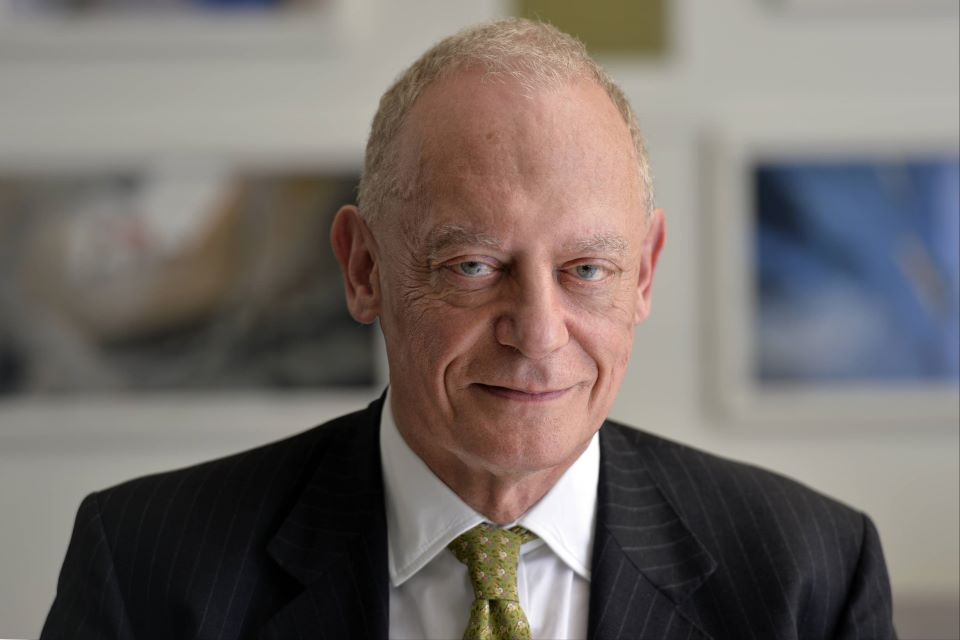

Minister of State for Investment
- In office 18 March 2020 – 7 July 2022
- Prime Minister: Boris Johnson
- Preceded by: The Baroness Fairhead
- Succeeded by: The Lord Johnson of Lainston

Member of the House of Lords
- Lord Temporal
- Life peerage 8 April 2020

Personal details
- Born: Gerald Edgar Grimstone; 27 August 1949 (age 77) Streatham, London, England
- Children: 3
- Education: Whitgift School
- Alma mater: Merton College, Oxford
- Occupation: Chairman, Standard Life; Chairman, Barclays Bank plc

Gerald Edgar Grimstone, Baron Grimstone of Boscobel (born 27 August 1949) is a British businessman. He was previously chairman of Barclays Bank plc and of Standard Life and group deputy chairman of Barclays plc, the holding company for the Barclays Group.

On 18 March 2020, he became an unpaid minister at the Department for International Trade and the Department for Business, Energy and Industrial Strategy, and it was announced he would become a life peer.

== Early life ==
Gerald Edgar Grimstone was born in August 1949, in Streatham, London, the son of Edgar Wilfred Grimstone (died 1986), of Croydon, and Dorothy Yvonne, née Martin. Edgar Grimstone was a publisher, having previously been director of the family carpet-fitting and flooring contracting business, D. Y. Grimstone Ltd. Grimstone has described his father as a "working class intellectual" and a senior member of the UK Communist Party.

He was educated at the independent Whitgift School, Croydon, and Merton College, Oxford, where he received a degree in chemistry.

== Career ==
Grimstone worked as a civil servant from 1972 to 1986, and then as a director of Schroders from 1986 to 1999.

Grimstone was chairman of Standard Life (now Standard Life Aberdeen) from 2007 till 2019, deputy chairman of Barclays since January 2016, a non-executive director of Deloitte and the lead non-executive director at the Ministry of Defence.

== Honours ==
Grimstone was knighted in the 2014 Birthday Honours, and received that accolade from the Prince of Wales on 6 February 2015. On 8 April 2020 he was created Baron Grimstone of Boscobel, of Belgravia in the City of Westminster.

== Personal life ==
In 1973, Grimstone married Hon. Janet Elizabeth Gudrun Suenson-Taylor, daughter of the 2nd Baron Grantchester; they had a son and two daughters before divorcing in 1995.

Political offices
Preceded by The Baroness Fairhead	Minister of State for Investment; 2020–2022	Succeeded by The Lord Johnson of Lainston
Orders of precedence in the United Kingdom
Preceded by The Lord Goldsmith of Richmond Park	Gentlemen; The Lord Grimstone of Boscobel	Followed by The Lord Greenhalgh
