= Annabel Goldie =

Scottish politician (born 1950)

The Right Honourable The Baroness Goldie DL
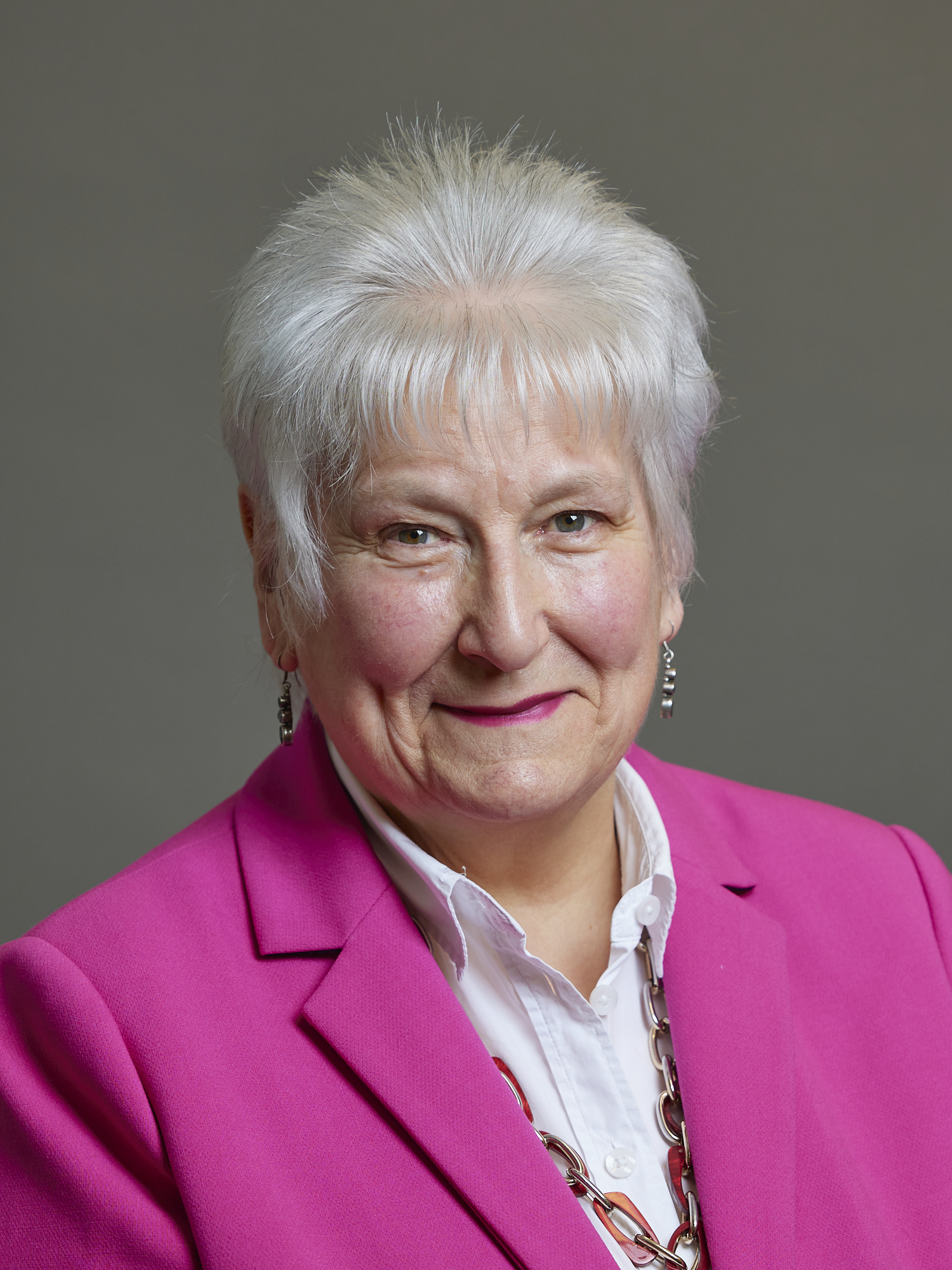
- Official portrait, 2024

Shadow Minister for Defence
- Incumbent
- Assumed office 1 September 2024
- Leader: Rishi Sunak; Kemi Badenoch
- Preceded by: The Lord Coaker

Minister of State for Defence
- In office 26 July 2019 – 13 November 2023
- Prime Minister: Boris Johnson; Liz Truss; Rishi Sunak
- Preceded by: The Earl Howe
- Succeeded by: The Earl of Minto

Baroness-in-Waiting Government Whip
- In office 17 July 2016 – 25 July 2019
- Prime Minister: Theresa May
- Preceded by: The Baroness Evans of Bowes Park
- Succeeded by: The Baroness Chisholm of Owlpen

Leader of the Scottish Conservative Party in the Scottish Parliament
- In office 8 November 2005 – 4 November 2011 (Note: Acting: 31 October 2005 – 8 November 2005)
- Deputy: Murdo Fraser
- UK party leader: Michael Howard (acting); David Cameron
- Preceded by: David McLetchie
- Succeeded by: Ruth Davidson (Note: As Leader of the Scottish Conservative Party.)
Parliamentary offices
Member of the House of Lords
Lord Temporal
Life peerage
3 October 2013
Member of the Scottish Parliament
for West Scotland (Note: West of Scotland from 1999-2011)
(1 of 7 Regional MSPs)
In office
6 May 1999 – 24 March 2016

Personal details
- Born: Annabel MacNicoll Goldie; 27 February 1950 (age 76) Glasgow, Scotland
- Citizenship: British
- Party: Conservative
- Education: University of Strathclyde
- Profession: Solicitor
- Website: Blog; Profile: scottishconservatives.com

Annabel MacNicoll Goldie, Baroness Goldie (born 27 February 1950) is a Scottish politician and life peer who served as Leader of the Scottish Conservative Party from 2005 to 2011 and Minister of State for Defence from 2019 to 2023. She was a Member of the Scottish Parliament (MSP), as one of the additional members for the West Scotland region, from 1999 to 2016, and has been Shadow Minister for Defence since 2024.

== Early life and career ==
Annabel MacNicoll Goldie was born in Glasgow, Scotland and raised in Kilmacolm and Lochwinnoch in Renfrewshire. She attended Kilmacolm Primary School and Greenock Academy; she was head girl at Greenock. She went on to study at the University of Strathclyde in Glasgow, graduating with an LL.B in 1971. Prior to entering politics, she was a solicitor and partner with Glasgow law firm Donaldson, Alexander, Russell & Haddow from 1978 to 2006.

== Political career ==
Goldie first stood for election to the House of Commons at the 1992 general election for the Renfrew West and Inverclyde constituency, coming second with 32.9% of the vote.

Goldie was elected to the Scottish Parliament in the 1999 election as a regional member for the West of Scotland electoral region. She retained this seat in the 2003, 2007 and 2011 elections. She became leader of the Scottish Conservatives in 2005 until standing down in 2011.

In addition to her appearance on the regional list ballots, she also stood as a candidate in the West Renfrewshire constituency for the Scottish Parliament in 1999, 2003 and 2007. While increasing the Conservative share of the vote each time, she was not elected although she raised her position from third to second place in 2007 with a reduced Labour majority. West Renfrewshire was abolished at the 2011 election, with Goldie unsuccessfully contending the new Renfrewshire North and West constituency.

On 31 October 2005, Goldie became acting leader after David McLetchie resigned as leader of the Scottish Conservatives following adverse publicity created by the publishing of details of expenses he claimed for taxi journeys.

Goldie put herself forward as a leadership candidate on 2 November 2005—a joint nomination with Murdo Fraser as her proposed deputy. Their nomination was unopposed and Goldie was appointed leader on 8 November 2005, the first woman to lead the Scottish Conservative Party. In her maiden speech as leader, she promised to act against "disloyalty and disobedience" in the party and in a reference to Margaret Thatcher she said, "I think you may take it matron's handbag will be in hyper-action. There could be worse precedents to follow".

At her first party conference in March 2006, Goldie set out her plans to make the Scottish Conservatives the "principal party of opposition in Scotland". However, her second conference as party leader was overshadowed by a leaked memo by David Mundell, the only Scottish Conservative MP in the House of Commons, and Shadow Secretary of State for Scotland, in which he criticised Goldie's leadership.

Goldie won praise for her leadership of the party into the 2007 Scottish Parliament election and personally as a skilled debater, and was labelled a "much-liked public figure". From February 2009 onwards, she was given monthly attendance rights to participate in the Official Opposition Shadow Cabinet in Westminster.

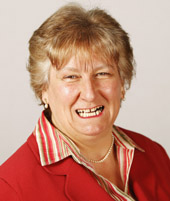
Annabel Goldie's official parliamentary portrait in 2011

On 9 May 2011, Goldie stated her intention to resign as leader of the Scottish Conservatives, citing her party's disappointing election result; she stood down on 4 November following the election of Ruth Davidson as her successor. Goldie later served as the party's culture and communities spokesperson and during the 2014 Scottish referendum served as the party's constitutional spokesperson. She stood down from the Parliament at the 2016 election.

Goldie was put on the 2013 list as a Conservative working peer in the House of Lords and was created a life peer on 3 October 2013, taking the title Baroness Goldie, of Bishopton in the County of Renfrewshire. In June 2016, she was appointed a Baroness-in-Waiting in the Royal Household, acting as a whip in the UK Government. She was promoted in July 2019 to Minister of State for Defence. She was later reappointed by Liz Truss and Rishi Sunak respectively. She was appointed Shadow Minister for Defence in September 2024 under Sunak, and reappointed by Kemi Badenoch.

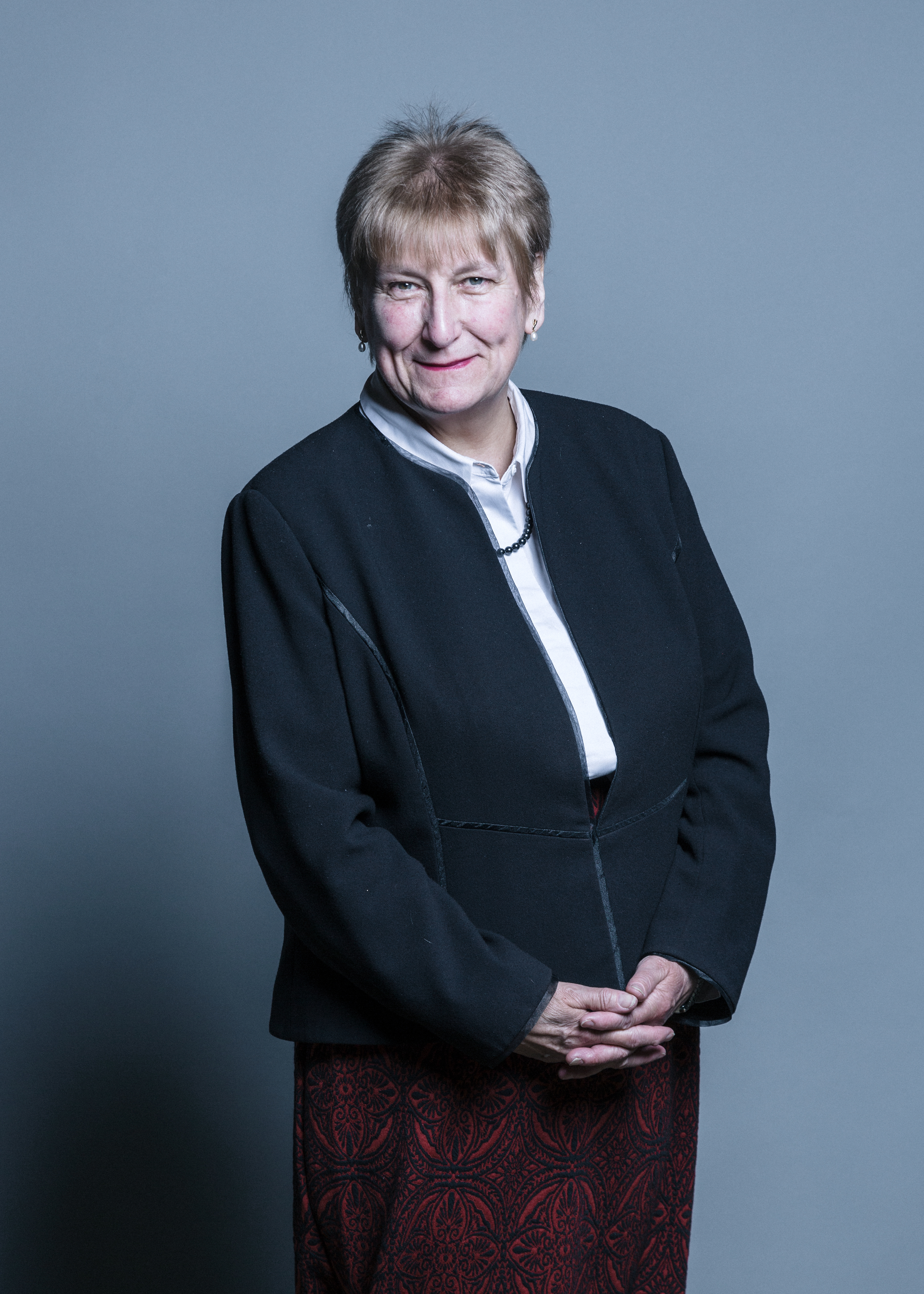
Official House of Lords portrait, 2018

She has identified the need for the armed forces to address climate change, and to improve the experience of women in the forces, as among her priorities.

== Personal life ==
Goldie lives in Bishopton, Renfrewshire. She is also an Elder in the Church of Scotland, and sits on the West of Scotland Advisory Board of the Salvation Army. She is a Deputy Lieutenant of the County of Renfrewshire.

== Notes ==
Scottish Parliament
Constituency established	Member of the Scottish Parliament for West Scotland; 1999–2016	Succeeded by Maurice Golden
Party political offices
Preceded by David McLetchie	Leader of the Scottish Conservative Party; 2005–2011	Succeeded by Ruth Davidson
Preceded by Jackson Carlaw	Deputy Leader of the Scottish Conservative Party; 1998–2005	Succeeded by Murdo Fraser
Political offices
Preceded by The Earl Howe	Minister of State for Defence; 2019–2023	Succeeded by The Earl of Minto
