= Darren Mott, Baron Mott =

British politician (born 1973)

The Right Honourable The Lord Mott OBE
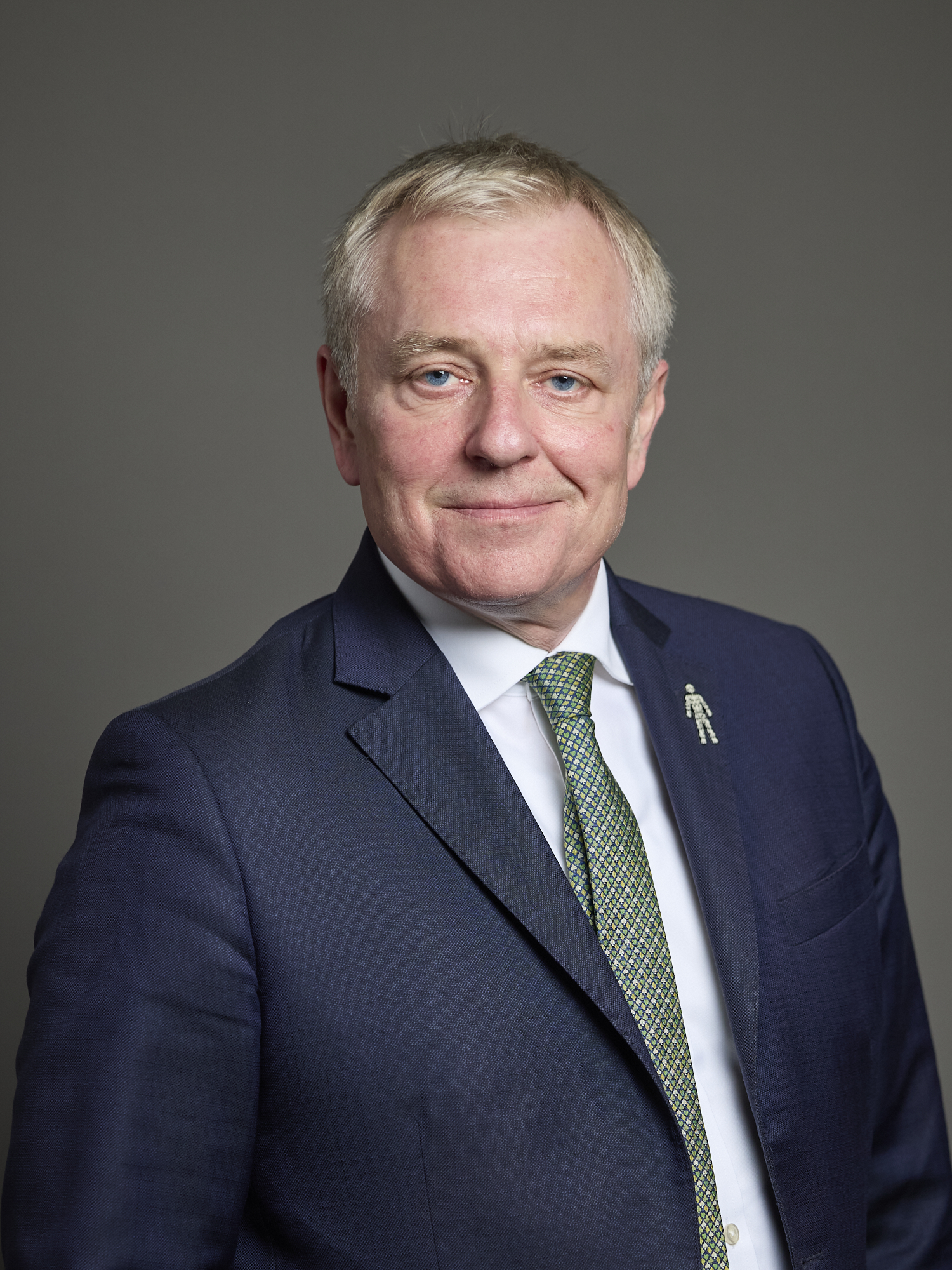
- Official portrait, 2025

Lord-in-Waiting Government Whip
- In office 2 June 2023 – 14 November 2023
- Prime Minister: Rishi Sunak
- Preceded by: The Baroness Bloomfield of Hinton Waldrist

Member of the House of Lords
- Lord Temporal
- Life peerage 19 June 2023

Personal details
- Born: Darren James Mott; 15 January 1973 (age 53)
- Party: Conservative
- Spouse: Olivia Leechman (m. 2024)

Darren James Mott, Baron Mott, OBE (born 15 January 1973) is a British Conservative politician and member of the House of Lords. In November 2022, he stood down as chief executive of the Conservative Party, after having worked for the party for more than 30 years.

Mott was appointed Officer of the Order of the British Empire (OBE) in the 2017 New Year Honours for political service.

In the 2023 Special Honours, Mott was made a life peer and appointed as a lord-in-waiting and whip for the Sunak ministry in the House of Lords, alongside former MEP Kay Swinburne, on 2 June. He was created Baron Mott, of Chatteris in the County of Cambridgeshire, on 19 June 2023, and was introduced to the House of Lords on 22 June.

In October 2024, Mott was given a paid trip to Azerbaijan by an Azerbaijani group with connections to the authoritarian regime in the country. Mott was pictured laying a wreath at the grave of Azerbaijan's dictator Heydar Aliyev.

Orders of precedence in the United Kingdom
Preceded by The Lord Young of Old Windsor	Gentlemen; Baron Mott	Followed by The Lord Gascoigne
