= Colwyn committee =

Colwyn Committee was set up under Lord Colwyn in 1923 to examine the question of Northern Ireland finances and contributions to be made to the Imperial Fund. The Committee suggested that the contribution to be made by Northern Ireland should be the residue after domestic expenditure had been met.
