= Minister of State for Defence =

British government minister

United Kingdom Minister of State for Defence
- Royal Arms of His Majesty's Government

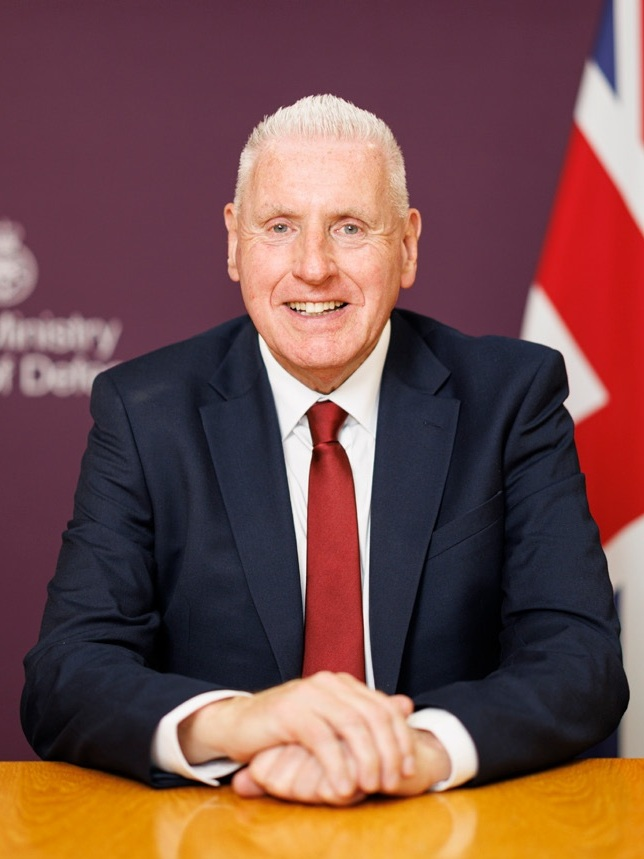
- Incumbent; Vernon Coaker, Lord Coaker since 8 July 2024
- Ministry of Defence
- Style: Minister
- Nominator: Prime Minister of the United Kingdom
- Appointer: The Monarch; on advice of the Prime Minister
- Term length: At His Majesty's pleasure
- First holder: Paul Drayson, Baron Drayson
- Website: Official website

The Minister of State for Defence is a mid-level position in the Ministry of Defence in the British government. It is currently held by Lord Coaker, who took the office on 8 July 2024.

== Responsibilities ==
The minister has the following ministerial responsibilities:

- Implementation of relevant SDR Vision and Recommendations
- International relations and defence diplomacy
- Professional military education
- Security and resilience
- Arms control and counter-proliferation
- Honours, awards and medicallic recognition
- Heritage and ceremonial
- Royal Hospital Chelsea
- UK Hydrographic Office
- Health and Safety
- Ministry of Defence Police
- Defence Fire and Rescue Service
- export licensing and controls
- Defence Medical Services

The holder also serves as the representative of the Ministry of Justice in the House of Lords

== List ==
Name	Portrait	Entered office	Left office	Length of term	Political party	Ministry
Minister of State for Strategic Defence Acquisition Reform
Paul Drayson; Baron Drayson		9 June 2009	6 May 2010	10 months and 27 days	Labour	Brown
Parliamentary Under-Secretary of State for Defence
John Astor; 3rd Baron Astor of Hever		28 May 2010	7 May 2015	4 years, 11 months and 9 days	Conservative	Cameron–Clegg (Con.–L.D.)
Minister of State for Defence
Frederick Curzon; 7th Earl Howe		11 May 2015	26 July 2019	4 years, 2 months and 15 days	Conservative	Cameron II
Frederick Curzon; 7th Earl Howe		11 May 2015	26 July 2019	4 years, 2 months and 15 days	Conservative	May I
Frederick Curzon; 7th Earl Howe		11 May 2015	26 July 2019	4 years, 2 months and 15 days	Conservative	May II
Annabel Goldie; Baroness Goldie		26 July 2019	13 November 2023	4 years, 3 months and 18 days	Conservative	Johnson I
Annabel Goldie; Baroness Goldie		26 July 2019	13 November 2023	4 years, 3 months and 18 days	Conservative	Johnson II
Annabel Goldie; Baroness Goldie		26 July 2019	13 November 2023	4 years, 3 months and 18 days	Conservative	Truss
Annabel Goldie; Baroness Goldie		26 July 2019	13 November 2023	4 years, 3 months and 18 days	Conservative	Sunak
Timothy Elliot-Murray-Kynynmound; 7th Earl of Minto		14 November 2023	5 July 2024	7 months and 21 days	Conservative	Sunak
Vernon Coaker; Baron Coaker		8 July 2024	Incumbent	2 years, 4 months and 4 days	Labour	Starmer
Vernon Coaker; Baron Coaker		8 July 2024	Incumbent	2 years, 4 months and 4 days	Labour	Burnham
