= Baron Colwyn =

Barony in the Peerage of the United Kingdom

Baron Colwyn, of Colwyn Bay in the County of Conwy, is a title in the Peerage of the United Kingdom. It was created in 1917 for the businessman Sir Frederick Smith, 1st Baronet. He had already been created a Baronet on 9 July 1912. As of 2024 the titles are held by his great-great-grandson, the fourth Baron, who succeeded his father in that year.

The third Lord Colwyn remained in the House of Lords until his retirement in 2022 as one of ninety elected hereditary peers after the passing of the House of Lords Act 1999 and sat on the Conservative benches.

== Barons Colwyn (1917) ==
Coat of arms of the baron

- Frederick Henry Smith, 1st Baron Colwyn (1859–1946)
- Frederick John Vivian Smith, 2nd Baron Colwyn (1914–1966)
- Ian Anthony Hamilton-Smith, 3rd Baron Colwyn (1942–2024)
- Craig Peter Hamilton-Smith, 4th Baron Colwyn (born 1968)

The heir apparent is the present holder's son, the Hon. Joshua Dougal Callum Hamilton-Smith (born 2006).

Baronetage of the United Kingdom
Preceded by Samuel baronets	Smith baronets of Colwyn Bay; 9 July 1912	Succeeded by Tangye baronets
