= Minister of state (United Kingdom) =

Member of the British government

A minister of state is a mid-tier minister of the Crown in the UK government.

== Hierarchy ==
Ministers of State are junior to the Prime Minister and Secretaries of State, but senior to Parliamentary Under-Secretaries of State and Parliamentary Private Secretaries. The office is defined in the House of Commons Disqualification Act 1975 as "...a member of Her Majesty’s Government in the United Kingdom who neither has charge of any public department nor holds any other of the offices specified in Schedule 2 to this Act or any office in respect of which a salary is payable out of money provided by Parliament under section 3(1)(b) of the Ministerial and other Salaries Act 1975".

== History ==
The designation was first made in 1941 for Lord Beaverbrook, who was a member of the War Cabinet and was tasked with creating the Ministry of Production. His successors were effectively Ministers without Portfolio, but this changed in 1950 when the first junior minister was appointed to that designation, in the Foreign Office, to release some burden from the then-Foreign Secretary.

== Duties ==
Ministers of State take charge of a particular part of their department and undertake specific delegated duties. To help to identify these duties, since the 1970s Ministers of State have often been granted a courtesy title which includes the word "for" (rather than "of").

== Current Ministers of State ==
The current Ministers of State are:

- HM Treasury
  - Minister of State for Efficiency and Transformation (joint with Cabinet Office)
- Foreign, Commonwealth and Development Office
  - Minister of State for Foreign Affairs
  - Minister of State for Middle East and North Africa
  - Minister of State for Pacific and the Environment (joint with Department for Environment, Food and Rural Affairs)
  - Minister of State for Asia
  - Minister of State for South Asia and the Commonwealth
- Home Office
  - Minister of State for Security
  - Minister of State for Crime and Policing (joint with Ministry of Justice)
  - Minister of State for Home Affairs (United Kingdom)
  - Minister of State for Building Safety and Communities
- Cabinet Office
  - Minister for the Constitution and European Union Relations
  - Minister of State for Efficiency and Transformation (joint with HM Treasury)
- Ministry of Justice
  - Minister of State for Prisons
  - Minister of State for Crime and Policing (joint with Home Office)
- Ministry of Defence
  - Minister of State for Defence Procurement
  - Minister of State for Defence
- Department of Health and Social Care
  - Minister of State for Health
  - Minister of State for Social Care
  - Minister of State for Patient Safety, Suicide Prevention and Mental Health
- Department for Energy Security and Net Zero
  - Minister of State for Energy Security and Net Zero
- Department for Business and Trade
  - Minister of State for Trade Policy
- Department for Work and Pensions
  - Minister of State for Disabled People, Health and Work
- Department for Education
  - Minister of State for Universities
  - Minister of State for School Standards
- Department for Environment, Food and Rural Affairs
  - Minister of State for Pacific and the Environment (joint with Foreign, Commonwealth and Development Office)
- Ministry of Housing, Communities and Local Government
  - Minister of State for Regional Growth and Local Government
  - Minister of State for Housing
  - Minister of State for Building Safety and Communities
- Department for Transport
  - Minister of State for Transport
- Northern Ireland Office
  - Minister of State for Northern Ireland
- Department for Culture, Media and Sport
  - Minister of State for Culture, Communications and Creative Industries
  - Minister of State for Digital and Culture
- Department for Science, Innovation and Technology
  - Minister of State for Media and Data

== Historic Ministers of State ==
- Department of Energy and Climate Change
  - Minister of State at the Department of Energy and Climate Change
- Department for Exiting the European Union
  - Minister of State for Exiting the European Union
- Department for International Development
  - Minister of State for International Development
- Privy Council Office
  - Minister of State for the Privy Council Office
- Ministry of Technology
  - Minister of State for Technology
- Scotland Office
  - Minister of State for Scotland
