= List of 2006 British incumbents =

This is a list of 2006 British incumbents.

== Government ==
- Monarch
  - Head of State – Her Majesty Elizabeth II, Queen of the United Kingdom (1952–2022)

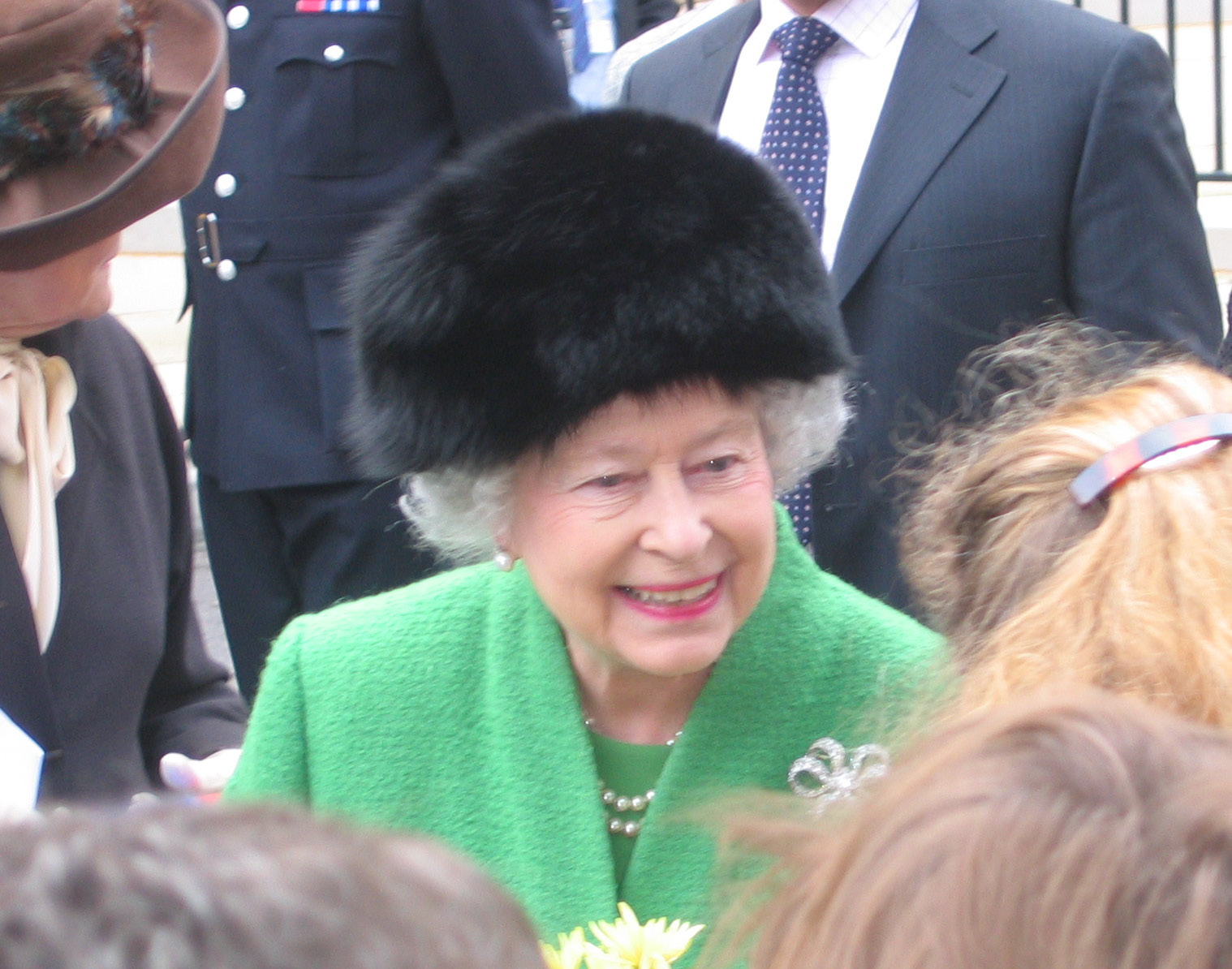
Elizabeth II

- Prime Minister
  - Head of Government – Tony Blair, Prime Minister of the United Kingdom, First Lord of the Treasury and Minister for the Civil Service (1997–2007)
- Deputy Prime Minister
  - Deputy Head of Government – John Prescott, Deputy Prime Minister of the United Kingdom and First Secretary of State (1997–2007)
- Chancellor of the Exchequer
  - Head of the Treasury – Gordon Brown, Chancellor of the Exchequer and Second Lord of the Treasury (1997–2007)
- Foreign Secretary
  1. Jack Straw, Secretary of State for Foreign and Commonwealth Affairs (2001–2006)
  2. Margaret Beckett, Secretary of State for Foreign and Commonwealth Affairs (2006–2007)
- Secretary of State for the Home Department
  1. Charles Clarke, Secretary of State for the Home Department (2004–2006)
  2. John Reid, Secretary of State for the Home Department (2006–2007)
- Secretary of State for Environment, Food and Rural Affairs
  1. Margaret Beckett, Secretary of State for Environment, Food and Rural Affairs (2001–2006)
  2. David Miliband, Secretary of State for Environment, Food and Rural Affairs (2006–2007)
- Secretary of State for Transport
  1. Alistair Darling, Secretary of State for Transport (2002–2006)
  2. Douglas Alexander, Secretary of State for Transport (2006–2007)
- Secretary of State for Scotland
  1. Alistair Darling, Secretary of State for Transport (2003–2006)
  2. Douglas Alexander, Secretary of State for Transport (2006–2007)
- Secretary of State for Health
  - Patricia Hewitt, Secretary of State for Health (2005–2007)
- Secretary of State for Northern Ireland
  - Peter Hain, Secretary of State for Northern Ireland (2002–2007)
- Secretary of State for Defence
  1. John Reid, Secretary of State for Defence (1999–2006)
  2. Des Browne, Secretary of State for Defence (2006–2007)

== Religion ==
- Archbishop of Canterbury
  - Rowan Williams, Archbishop of Canterbury (2003–2012)
- Archbishop of York
  - John Sentamu, Archbishop of York (2005–present)

== Royalty ==
- Prince consort
  - The Duke of Edinburgh (m. 1947)
- Heir apparent
  - The Prince of Wales (since 1958)
