= Office of the Leader =

Office of the Leader may refer to:

- Office of the Leader of the House of Lords, Office of the leader of House of Lords
- Leader of the House of Commons, Office of the leader of House of Commons
- Office of the Supreme Leader of Iran, official residence and office of the Supreme Leader of Iran
