= 2014 British cabinet reshuffle =

UK cabinet reshuffle undertaken by David Cameron

David Cameron

British prime minister David Cameron reshuffled the Conservative members of his coalition government on 15 July 2014. The reshuffle, intended to strengthen his party's position in advance of the 2015 general election, had been long anticipated, as Cameron had maintained an unusually high level of stability amongst the senior ranks of his government, with only one prior reshuffle of significance, and many ministers having remained in place since their election in 2010. The reshuffle also featured the appointment of a new European Commissioner representing the United Kingdom, as the term of Lady Ashton was set to expire later in 2014.

Liberal Democrat ministers, led by the Deputy Prime Minister, Nick Clegg, were unaffected by the reshuffle.

== Changes in the ministry ==
Colour key
- Joined the Cabinet
- Left the Cabinet

Minister	Position before reshuffle	Position after reshuffle
Philip Hammond	Secretary of State for Defence	Secretary of State for Foreign and Commonwealth Affairs
Sajid Javid	Secretary of State for Culture, Media & Sport; Minister for Equalities	Remained Culture Secretary, with the Equalities brief given to Nicky Morgan
Michael Gove	Secretary of State for Education	Parliamentary Secretary to the Treasury (Chief Whip)
William Hague	First Secretary of State; Secretary of State for Foreign & Commonwealth Affairs	Leader of the House of Commons, but remains First Secretary of State
Nicky Morgan	Financial Secretary to the Treasury; Minister for Women	Secretary of State for Education, Equalities brief added to role as Women's Minister.
Lord Hill of Oareford	Leader of the House of Lords; Chancellor of the Duchy of Lancaster	Left the government, appointed the United Kingdom's European Commissioner
Michael Fallon	Minister of State for Business, Enterprise, and Energy	Secretary of State for Defence
Stephen Crabb	Parliamentary Under-Secretary of State for Wales	Secretary of State for Wales
Dominic Grieve	Attorney General for England and Wales	Left the government
Oliver Letwin	Minister of State for Government Policy	Given additional role as Chancellor of the Duchy of Lancaster
Kenneth Clarke	Minister without portfolio	Left the government
Baroness Stowell of Beeston	Parliamentary Under-Secretary of State for Communities and Local Government	Leader of the House of Lords, but without full membership in the cabinet
Liz Truss	Parliamentary Under-Secretary of State for Education and Childcare	Secretary of State for Environment, Food and Rural Affairs
Jeremy Wright	Parliamentary Under-Secretary of State for Justice	Attorney General for England and Wales
Esther McVey	Minister of State for Employment	Attending Cabinet
David Jones	Secretary of State for Wales	Left the government
Andrew Lansley	Leader of the House of Commons; Lord Privy Seal	Left the government
Owen Paterson	Secretary of State for Environment, Food and Rural Affairs	Left the government
Sir George Young	Parliamentary Secretary to the Treasury (Chief Whip)	Left the government

== Reaction ==
=== Promotion of women ===
The Daily Mail's infamous "Downing Street Catwalk" feature

Downing Street had long briefed that the promotion of "as many as ten" women, both into the lower ranks of government and the cabinet, would be pursued aggressively in the reshuffle. This led to much media speculation over the future of male ministers, and lowered the expectations of male backbenchers, with one reported to have said "If you're white and male, you've got no chance of promotion". This attracted attacks on Cameron from both the right and left before the reshuffle even began, with Tory peer Michael Ashcroft saying that the "impending ministerial reshuffle will be determined by optics rather than ability", and Labour's Shadow Home Secretary, Yvette Cooper, decrying the appointments as a "last-minute worry" about the female vote in the next spring's election.

Despite the pre-emptive criticism, Cameron promoted many of the women who had been subject to speculation prior to the reshuffle, including Liz Truss, who replaced Owen Paterson as Environment Secretary and became the youngest female cabinet minister in history. Cameron also promoted Nicky Morgan to the full cabinet as Education Secretary, while granting the incumbent employment minister Esther McVey and new Leader of the House of Lords, Baroness Stowell of Beeston the right to attend cabinet meetings. The reshuffle ultimately resulted in five of 17 Conservative full cabinet members being women, and a quarter of the total Conservative ministerial team.

Further controversy arose the day after the reshuffle, when the Daily Mail ran the front-page headline "Thigh-flashing Esther and the battle of the Downing St catwalk", with an accompanying graphic on pages 4 and 5 titled "Esther: Queen of the Downing Street Catwalk", which prominently featured images of McVey, Truss, Morgan and Stowell, as well as newly minted junior ministers Penny Mordaunt, Amber Rudd, Priti Patel, Anna Soubry, and Claire Perry walking up Downing Street to receive their commissions from Cameron. The headline and graphic were criticised by female politicians from all parties, with former Tory Welsh Secretary Cheryl Gillan saying she was "appalled", Liberal Democrat whip Jenny Willott describing the coverage as "outrageous", and Labour MP Anne McGuire declaring that it "made Blair's Babes look positively PC". Despite widespread condemnation of the piece, McVey, the primary focus of it, refused to be drawn into the issue, merely saying that she was "delighted to be in what must be one of the most important jobs".

=== Controversy over the Leadership of the House of Lords ===
Controversy erupted on multiple fronts over Baroness Stowell of Beeston becoming the first Leader of the House of Lords in memory to not be a full member of the cabinet. This was ostensibly to save a seat for William Hague, the Leader of the House of Commons which is not a role which usually comes with a place in the cabinet. Labour peers attacked Cameron over the decision, and even figures on the right, such as Lord Forsyth declared it "vital" that the leader of the Lords carry the authority of a cabinet minister. On 22 July, Cameron expressed his regret over the situation in a letter to Lord MacGregor of Pulham Market, the Chairman of the Association of Conservative Peers, saying that the Leader of the Lords "should, as a general rule, always be a full member of the Cabinet" but that "unfortunately it was not possible on this occasion". A later report by the House of Lords Constitution Committee found that "core part of our constitution that ministers are drawn from the legislature and that the legislature is bicameral. It sits very uneasily with those principles for one House of Parliament to be unrepresented in the full Cabinet".

Labour MPs also attacked the decrease in salary which accompanied the loss of full cabinet status, pointing out that Stowell would be earning £22,000 less per annum than her male predecessor. In response, it was announced that Stowell's pay would be topped up by the Conservative Party. This in itself stirred controversy, as many believed that receiving payment from the Conservative Party would constitute a conflict of interest in the performance of her duties as Leader of the Lords; Stowell ultimately declined the party's offer to top up her salary.

=== Sacking of Owen Paterson ===
The removal of Owen Paterson as Environment Secretary after his response to summer flooding and call for a cull of badgers were criticised was poorly received by many on the right. Christopher Booker called his removal an "insult to the countryside", and one of Cameron's worst mistakes as leader. Paterson reportedly told Cameron that his sacking was a "big mistake" and would be taken as a "kick in the teeth" by rural Conservative voters likely to defect to the UK Independence Party, and alleged that he was removed due to pressure from a consortium environmental groups, renewable energy companies, and environmentalist public officials which he described as "the green blob".

In the days after his sacking, Paterson was often seen with Liam Fox, the former Defence Secretary tipped in the media for a return to the cabinet, who was said to have felt "humiliated" by Cameron's offer of a junior position at the Foreign Office during the reshuffle, prompting fears amongst Cameron's advisers that Paterson and Fox would come to lead opposition to Cameron within the party.

=== Moving of Michael Gove ===
Michael Gove's move from Education Secretary to Chief Whip, widely perceived as a demotion, came after Conservative campaign chief strategist Lynton Crosby warned Cameron that Gove's brand was "toxic" in polling. The move was criticised by many on the right, including Gove's wife, Sarah Vine, and his special adviser, Dominic Cummings, who said the move constituted Cameron's "surrender" to education pressure groups. Despite the downwards perception of the move, both Gove and Cameron downplayed that it was a demotion, with Cameron saying that the "chief whip is one of the most important jobs in government" and he wanted one of his "big hitters" who had done "extraordinary things for the country" to fill the role. Cameron also pointed to the fact that Gove's brief as Chief Whip would be more expansive than was tradition, with Gove playing a major role in both the government's communications strategy and the Conservative Party's general election planning. Gove himself declined to call the move a demotion, saying that while it was a "wrench" to leave as Education Secretary, it was "exciting to be given a role at the heart of government".

=== Appointment of Lord Hill as European Commissioner ===
The selection of the little known Jonathan Hill to serve as the United Kingdom's European Commissioner was criticised both domestically and on the continent. The position, which fell to Hill as a self described "reluctant conscript", had widely been expected to go to the former Health Secretary, Andrew Lansley, former chief whip Andrew Mitchell, retiring universities minister David Willetts, or the former Conservative leader Michael Howard. Hill, who had responded "non, non, non" when asked if he was interested in the job just a month before the reshuffle, did not fit incoming Commission President Jean-Claude Juncker's preference for high-profile or female commissioners, leading to fears that the United Kingdom would receive an insignificant portfolio in retaliation.

Nigel Farage, the leader of the UK Independence Party attacked Hill, asking "who are you?" and saying that there "is nothing in Mr Hill's career path to suggest that he is the one to renegotiate radical reform". Mats Persson, then the director of Open Europe, also attacked the appointment, saying that the fear of a by-election was allowed to "trump sending the highest profile candidate to Brussels", and that as a result the "chances of the UK securing one of the key portfolios in the next European Commission – internal market, competition or trade – have worsened".

Hill's confirmation hearings before the European Parliament did not pass without incident. Hill, who was viewed by left-wing MEPs as too close to the City of London for the financial portfolio he had been allocated, was forced to appear before a second confirmation hearing, at which he was called "charming but empty". Hill was ultimately confirmed, and served until his resignation after the 2016 United Kingdom European Union membership referendum.

=== Knighthoods for sacked ministers ===
Cameron was also attacked by some on the left for awarding knighthoods to three sacked ministers, Alan Duncan of the Department for International Development, Hugh Robertson of the Foreign Office, and Solicitor General Oliver Heald. Duncan and Robertson were both made Knights Commander of the Order of St Michael and St George, while Heald was made a Knight Bachelor. Labour MP Sarah Champion took particular issue with the fact that Cameron had appointed more men knights than he had women to the full cabinet, saying that the "patronage for the old boys' club shows just how out of touch" Cameron had become. Cameron's appointment of Kenneth Clarke, one of the longest serving cabinet members in modern history, to become a Companion of Honour was not met with criticism, however, and was generally praised, with Labour MP Stephen Pound drawing a distinction by saying that he had "nothing against long-service medals but using honours to sweeten the pill of dismissal is an abuse". Cameron responded the criticism by saying that he found it "interesting to take a lecture from a party that gave a knighthood to Fred Goodwin", referring to the disgraced Royal Bank of Scotland executive, knighted under Tony Blair in 2004, who had recently been stripped of the honour.

== See also ==
- 2012 British cabinet reshuffle
- Premiership of David Cameron
