= Minister without portfolio (United Kingdom) =

Cabinet position in the United Kingdom

United Kingdom Minister without Portfolio
- Royal arms as used by His Majesty's Government

- Flag of the United Kingdom
- Incumbent; Vacant since 21 July 2026
- Cabinet Office
- Style: The Right Honourable
- Reports to: The Prime Minister
- Nominator: The Prime Minister
- Appointer: The British Monarch on the advice of the Prime Minister
- Term length: No fixed term
- Salary: £159,038 per annum (2022) (including £86,584 MP salary)
- Website: GOV.UK

In the United Kingdom, a minister without portfolio is often a cabinet position, or often attends cabinet. The role is sometimes used to enable the chairman of the governing party, contemporarily either the chairman of the Conservative Party or the chair of the Labour Party, to attend cabinet meetings. (If so, they hold the title of "Party chairman".) The sinecure positions of Lord Privy Seal, Paymaster General, and Chancellor of the Duchy of Lancaster which have few responsibilities and have a higher rank in the order of precedence than minister without portfolio can also be used to similar effect. The corresponding shadow minister is the Shadow Minister without Portfolio.

== List of office holders ==
- The Lord Somers, as part of the Townshend ministry
- Henry Seymour Conway, as part of the Chatham ministry and Grafton ministry

Minister	Concurrent office(s)	Tenure	Political party	Prime Minister
William Cavendish-Bentinck, 3rd Duke of Portland		January 1805 – February 1806	Whig	William Pitt the Younger
William Fitzwilliam, 4th Earl Fitzwilliam		October 1806 – March 1807	Whig	William Grenville (Ministry of All the Talents)
William Cavendish-Bentinck, 3rd Duke of Portland		4 October 1809 – 30 October 1809	Tory	Spencer Perceval
Dudley Ryder, 1st Earl of Harrowby		November 1809 – June 1812	Tory (Pittite)	Spencer Perceval
John Pratt, 2nd Earl Camden (created 1st Marquess Camden, August 1812)		8 April 1812 – December 1812	Tory	Spencer Perceval
John Pratt, 2nd Earl Camden (created 1st Marquess Camden, August 1812)		8 April 1812 – December 1812	Tory	Robert Jenkinson, 2nd Earl of Liverpool
Henry Phipps, 1st Earl of Mulgrave		January 1819 – May 1820	Tory	Robert Jenkinson, 2nd Earl of Liverpool
Henry Petty-Fitzmaurice, 3rd Marquess of Lansdowne		April 1827 – July 1827	Whig	George Canning
William Bentinck, 4th Duke of Portland		July 1827 – September 1827	Tory (Canningite)	George Canning
George Howard, 6th Earl of Carlisle		22 November 1830 – 5 June 1834	Whig	Charles Grey, 2nd Earl Grey
Arthur Wellesley, 1st Duke of Wellington		3 September 1841 – July 1846	Conservative	Robert Peel
Henry Petty-Fitzmaurice, 3rd Marquess of Lansdowne		28 December 1852 – 21 February 1858	Whig	George Hamilton-Gordon, 4th Earl of Aberdeen (until February 1855)
Henry Petty-Fitzmaurice, 3rd Marquess of Lansdowne		28 December 1852 – 21 February 1858	Whig	Henry John Temple, 3rd Viscount Palmerston
Lord John Russell		February 1853 – June 1854	Whig	George Hamilton-Gordon, 4th Earl of Aberdeen
Spencer Horatio Walpole		May 1867 – February 1868	Conservative	Edward Smith-Stanley, 14th Earl of Derby
Michael Hicks Beach		7 March 1887 – 20 February 1888	Conservative	Robert Gascoyne-Cecil, 3rd Marquess of Salisbury
Henry Petty-Fitzmaurice, 5th Marquess of Lansdowne		25 May 1915 – December 1916	Liberal Unionist	H. H. Asquith (Coalition)
Arthur Henderson	Member of the War Cabinet	10 December 1916 – 12 August 1917	Labour	David Lloyd George (Coalition)
Alfred Milner, 1st Viscount Milner	Member of the War Cabinet	10 December 1916 – 18 April 1918	Conservative	David Lloyd George (Coalition)
Jan Smuts	Member of the War Cabinet	22 June 1917 – 10 January 1919	South African Party	David Lloyd George (Coalition)
Edward Carson	Member of the War Cabinet	17 July 1917 – 21 January 1918	Ulster Unionist Party (Irish Unionist)	David Lloyd George (Coalition)
George Barnes	Member of the War Cabinet (until October 1919)	13 August 1917 – 27 January 1920	Labour	David Lloyd George (Coalition)
Austen Chamberlain	Member of the War Cabinet	18 April 1918 – 10 January 1919	Conservative	David Lloyd George (Coalition)
Eric Campbell Geddes	Member of the War Cabinet	10 January 1919 – 31 October 1919	Conservative	David Lloyd George (Coalition)
Laming Worthington-Evans	Member of the War Cabinet (until October 1919)	10 January 1919 – 13 February 1921	Conservative	David Lloyd George (Coalition)
Christopher Addison		1 April 1921 – 14 July 1921	Liberal	David Lloyd George (Coalition)
Anthony Eden	Minister for League of Nations affairs	7 June 1935 – 22 December 1935	Conservative	Stanley Baldwin (Coalition)
Eustace Percy		7 June 1935 – 31 March 1936	Conservative	Stanley Baldwin (Coalition)
Leslie Burgin	Minister of Supply-designate	21 April 1939 – 14 July 1939	National Liberal Party	Neville Chamberlain (Coalition)
Maurice Hankey	Member of the War Cabinet	September 1939 – 10 May 1940	no party	Neville Chamberlain (Coalition)
Arthur Greenwood	Member of the War Cabinet	11 May 1940 – 22 February 1942	Labour	Winston Churchill (Coalition)
William Jowitt		30 December 1942 – 8 October 1944	Labour	Winston Churchill (Coalition)
A. V. Alexander		4 October 1946 – 20 December 1946	Labour Co-operative	Clement Attlee
Arthur Greenwood		17 April 1947 – 29 September 1947	Labour	Clement Attlee
Geoffrey FitzClarence, 5th Earl of Munster		18 October 1954 – 1957	Conservative	Winston Churchill
Geoffrey FitzClarence, 5th Earl of Munster		18 October 1954 – 1957	Conservative	Anthony Eden
Stormont Mancroft, 2nd Baron Mancroft		11 June 1957 – 1958	Conservative	Harold Macmillan
Henry Scrymgeour-Wedderburn, 11th Earl of Dundee		23 October 1958 – 1961	Unionist	Harold Macmillan
Percy Mills, 1st Baron Mills	Deputy Leader of the House of Lords	9 October 1961 – 13 July 1962	Conservative	Harold Macmillan
Bill Deedes		13 July 1962 – 16 October 1964	Conservative	Harold Macmillan
Bill Deedes		13 July 1962 – 16 October 1964	Conservative	Alec Douglas-Home
Peter Carington, 6th Baron Carrington	Leader of the House of Lords	20 October 1963 – 16 October 1964	Conservative	Alec Douglas-Home
Eric Fletcher		19 October 1964 – 6 April 1966	Labour	Harold Wilson
Arthur Champion, Baron Champion	Deputy Leader of the House of Lords	21 October 1964 – 7 January 1967	Labour	Harold Wilson
Douglas Houghton		6 April 1966 – 7 January 1967	Labour	Harold Wilson
Edward Shackleton, Baron Shackleton	Deputy Leader of the House of Lords	7 January 1967 – 16 January 1968	Labour	Harold Wilson
Patrick Gordon Walker		7 January 1967– 21 August 1967	Labour	Harold Wilson
George Thomson		17 October 1968 – 6 October 1969	Labour	Harold Wilson
Peter Shore		6 October 1969 – 19 June 1970	Labour	Harold Wilson
Niall Macpherson, 1st Baron Drumalbyn		15 October 1970 – 1974	Unionist	Edward Heath
Morys Bruce, 4th Baron Aberdare		8 January – March 1974	Conservative	Edward Heath
David Young, Baron Young of Graffham	advising on unemployment	11 September 1984 – 3 September 1985	Conservative	Margaret Thatcher
Jeremy Hanley	Chairman of the Conservative Party	20 July 1994 – 5 July 1995	Conservative	John Major
Brian Mawhinney	Chairman of the Conservative Party	5 July 1995 – 2 May 1997	Conservative	John Major
Peter Mandelson	called the "Dome Secretary"	5 May 1997 – 26 July 1998	Labour	Tony Blair
Charles Clarke	Labour Party Chair	8 June 2001 – 24 October 2002	Labour	Tony Blair
John Reid	Labour Party Chair	24 October 2002 – 4 April 2003	Labour	Tony Blair
Ian McCartney	Labour Party Chair	4 April 2003 – 5 May 2006	Labour	Tony Blair
Hazel Blears	Labour Party Chair	5 May 2006 – 28 June 2007	Labour	Tony Blair
no appointment		28 June 2007 – 12 May 2010	Labour	Gordon Brown
Sayeeda Warsi, Baroness Warsi	Co-Chairman of the Conservative Party	12 May 2010 – 6 September 2012	Conservative	David Cameron (Coalition)
Grant Shapps	Co-Chairman of the Conservative Party	6 September 2012 – 8 May 2015	Conservative	David Cameron (Coalition)
Kenneth Clarke	Trade envoy	6 September 2012 – 14 July 2014	Conservative	David Cameron (Coalition)
John Hayes	Senior Parliamentary Adviser to the Prime Minister (Cabinet Office)	28 March 2013 – 15 July 2014	Conservative	David Cameron (Coalition)
Robert Halfon	Deputy Chairman of the Conservative Party	8 May 2015 – 17 July 2016	Conservative	David Cameron
no appointment		17 July 2016 – 8 January 2018	Conservative	Theresa May
Brandon Lewis	Chairman of the Conservative Party	8 January 2018 – 24 July 2019	Conservative	Theresa May
James Cleverly	Chairman of the Conservative Party	24 July 2019 – 13 February 2020	Conservative	Boris Johnson
Amanda Milling	Chairman of the Conservative Party	13 February 2020 – 15 September 2021	Conservative	Boris Johnson
Oliver Dowden	Chairman of the Conservative Party	15 September 2021 – 24 June 2022	Conservative	Boris Johnson
no appointment		24 June 2022 – 7 July 2022	Conservative	Boris Johnson
Andrew Stephenson	Chairman of the Conservative Party	7 July 2022 – 6 September 2022	Conservative	Boris Johnson
Sir Jake Berry	Chairman of the Conservative Party	6 September 2022 – 25 October 2022	Conservative	Liz Truss
Nadhim Zahawi	Chairman of the Conservative Party	25 October 2022 – 29 January 2023	Conservative	Rishi Sunak
Greg Hands	Chairman of the Conservative Party	7 February 2023 – 13 November 2023	Conservative	Rishi Sunak
Richard Holden	Chairman of the Conservative Party	13 November 2023 – 5 July 2024	Conservative	Rishi Sunak
Ellie Reeves	Chair of the Labour Party	6 July 2024 – 6 September 2025	Labour	Keir Starmer
Anna Turley	Chair of the Labour Party	6 September 2025 – 21 July 2026	Labour	Keir Starmer
no appointment		21 July 2026 – Present	Labour	Andy Burnham

== See also ==
- Minister without portfolio
