= Leader of the House of Lords =

Member of the Cabinet of the United Kingdom

United Kingdom Leader of the House of Lords

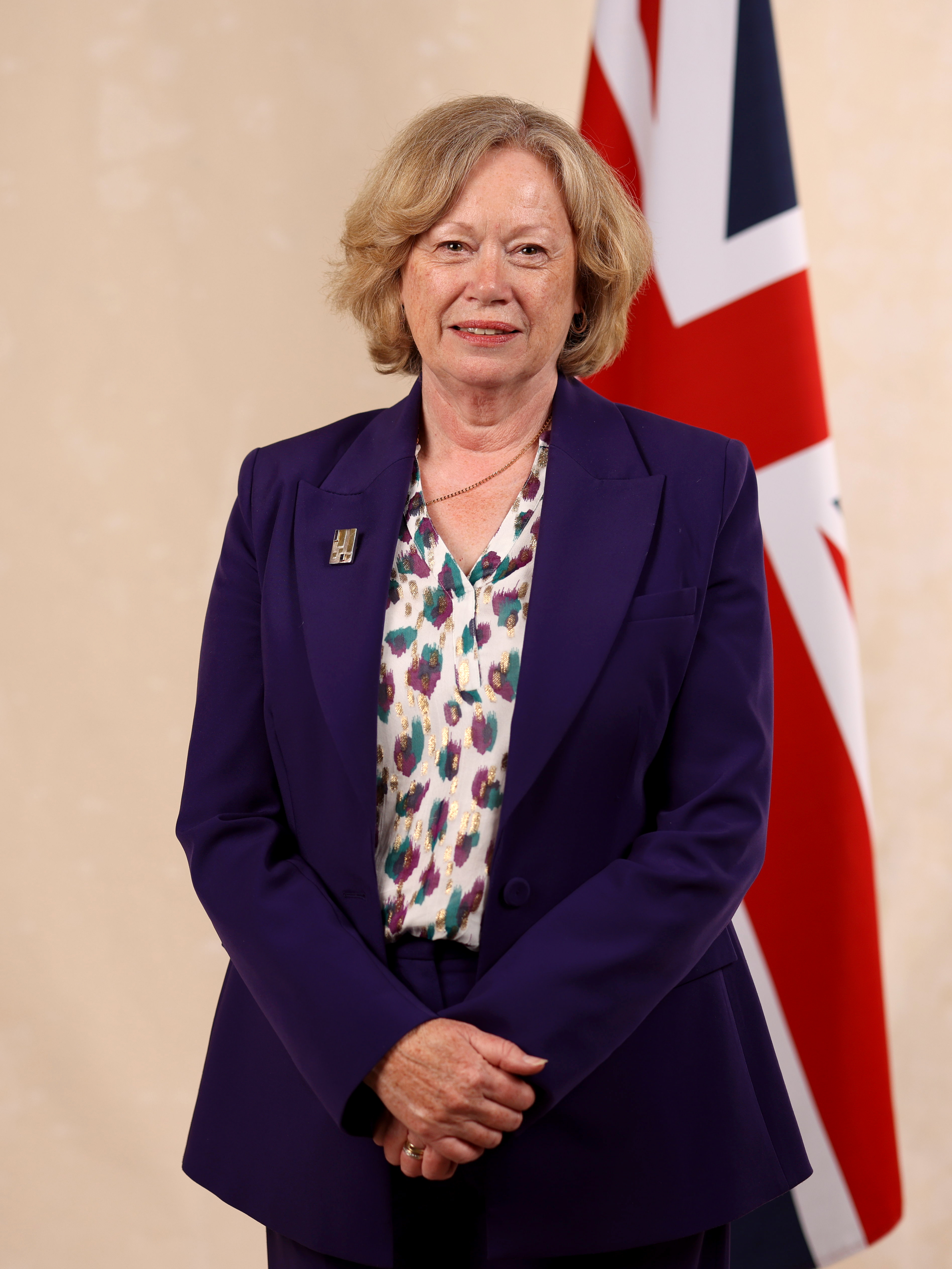
- Incumbent; Angela Smith, Baroness Smith of Basildon since 5 July 2024
- Office of the Leader of the House
- Type: House Leader
- Nominator: Prime Minister
- Appointer: Prime Minister

The leader of the House of Lords is a member of the Cabinet of the United Kingdom who is responsible for arranging government business in the House of Lords. ("Government" here means the controlling faction of the parliament, headed by the Prime Minister.) The post is also the leader of the governing party in the House of Lords who acts as the government party chairperson in the house. The role is always held in combination with a formal Cabinet position, usually one of the sinecure offices of Lord President of the Council, Lord Keeper of the Privy Seal or Chancellor of the Duchy of Lancaster. Unless the Leader is also a departmental minister, being Leader constitutes the bulk of their government responsibilities, but it has never been an independent salaried office. The Office of the Leader of the House of Lords is a ministerial department.

Though the leader of the House is a member of the cabinet and remains a partisan figure, the leader also has responsibilities to the House as a whole. In contrast to the House of Commons, where proceedings are controlled by the speaker, proceedings in the Lords are controlled by peers themselves, under the rules set out in the Standing Orders. The leader of the House has the responsibility of reminding the House of these rules and facilitating the Lords' self-regulation, though any member may draw attention to breaches of order or failure to observe customs. The Leader is often called upon to advise on procedures and points of order and is required to determine the order of speakers on Supplementary Questions, subject to the wishes of the House. However, like the Lord Speaker, the Leader of the House has no power to rule on points of order or to intervene during an inappropriate speech.

Until the election of the first Lord Speaker on 4 July 2006, the Leader of the House had responsibility for making preliminary decisions on requests for Private Notice Questions and for waiving the sub judice rule in certain cases. Those functions were transferred to the Lord Speaker.

== History ==
The title seems to have come into use some time after 1800, as a formal way of referring to the peer who managed government business in the upper House, irrespective of which salaried position they held in the cabinet. However, it may have been used as early as 1689, applied to George Savile, 1st Marquess of Halifax, when he was Speaker of the House of Lords during the Convention Parliament of that year.

The role developed during the first quarter of the eighteenth century, at the same time as the role of Prime Minister and the system of Cabinet government. In the wake of the English Civil War, the Glorious Revolution and the succession of the Hanoverians to the throne, Britain evolved a system of government where ministers were sustained in office by their ability to carry legislation through Parliament. It was therefore necessary for a member of the government to take responsibility for steering government legislation through each House.

The Earl of Sunderland initiated aspects of the role during the Whig Junto under Queen Anne. Sunderland and the other Whigs were dismissed from office in reaction to their co-ordination of government matters, which was taken as a threat to the power of the monarch. Sunderland returned to power under George I, as Lord Privy Seal. The first documentary evidence of the existence of the role comes from 1717, when Sunderland became Secretary of State for the Northern Department: in the form of lists of peers invited to the office of the Northern Secretary immediately before sessions of Parliament.

When the Prime Minister sat in the House of Lords, which was common until the beginning of the twentieth century, he usually held the position of Leader of the House of Lords. When the Prime Minister sat in the Commons, the position of Leader of the Lords was often held by the Foreign Secretary or Colonial Secretary. In some coalition governments, it was held by the party leader who was not Prime Minister.

Since the end of the Marquess of Salisbury's last government, in 1902, the position clearly exists in its own right as a member of the cabinet. Since 1966 it has only been combined with sinecure positions and the holder has not been a departmental minister though some have held additional responsibilities such as Quintin Hogg, 2nd Viscount Hailsham also being designated "Minister for Science" or Margaret Baroness Jay also being "Minister for Women". The first female Leader of the Lords was Janet Young, Baroness Young in 1981–1983. Lord Peart, The Viscount Whitelaw and Lord Wakeham served as Leader of the Lords having previously been Leader of the House of Commons.

=== Families ===
- Robert Gascoyne-Cecil, 3rd Marquess of Salisbury served as Leader of the House of Lords from 1885 to 1886, from 1886 to 1892 and from 1895 to 1902. His son James Gascoyne-Cecil, 4th Marquess of Salisbury served as Leader from 1925 to 1929. His son in turn, Robert Gascoyne-Cecil, 5th Marquess of Salisbury served as Leader first from 1942 to 1945 as Viscount Cranborne by means of a writ of acceleration, and as the Marquess of Salisbury from 1951 to 1957. His grandson, Robert Gascoyne-Cecil, 7th Marquess of Salisbury, served as Leader from 1994 to 1997, as Viscount Cranborne, again by means of a writ of acceleration.
- Douglas Hogg, 1st Viscount Hailsham served as Leader of the House of Lords from 1931 to 1935. His son Quintin Hogg, 2nd Viscount Hailsham served as Leader from 1960 to 1963.

== Responsibilities ==
- The organisation of government business in the House.
- Management and delivery of the Government's legislative programme (through the House of Lords) and facilitating the passage of individual bills.
- Leading the House (in the Chamber and as a key member of domestic committees to do with procedure, conduct, and the internal governance of the House).
- Issues connected to the House of Lords and its governance.
- Speaking for the Government in the Chamber on a range of issues, including repeating in the House of Lords statements made to the Commons by the Prime Minister.
- Ceremonial and other duties as the Lord Keeper of the Privy Seal.
- Providing assistance to all Lords and offering advice on procedure.
- Expressing the collective feelings of the House on formal occasions, such as motions of thanks or congratulations.

== List ==
Because the post is a parliamentary one and not a ministerial office in its own right, it is not always included in official lists of government offices, especially for earlier periods. This can make it difficult to determine who the Leader of the House of Lords was in a particular ministry.

Leader	Term of office		Other ministerial offices held as Leader of the House of Lords	Political party	Prime Minister
Charles Spencer; 3rd Earl of Sunderland	April; 1717	March; 1718	– Secretary of State for the Northern Department		No such office
James Stanhope; 1st Earl Stanhope; Viscount Stanhope until April 1718	March; 1718	5 February 1721	– Secretary of State for the Northern Department		No such office
Charles Townshend; 2nd Viscount Townshend	February; 1721	May; 1730	– Secretary of State for the Northern Department	Whig	Robert Walpole
William Stanhope; 1st Earl of Harrington; Lord Harrington until 1742	May; 1730	February; 1742	– Secretary of State for the Northern Department		Robert Walpole
John Carteret; 2nd Earl Granville; Baron Carteret until 1744	12 February 1742	24 November 1744	– Secretary of State for the Northern Department	Whig	Spencer Compton, 1st Earl of Wilmington (until July 1743)
John Carteret; 2nd Earl Granville; Baron Carteret until 1744	12 February 1742	24 November 1744	– Secretary of State for the Northern Department	Whig	Henry Pelham (from 27 August 1743)
William Stanhope; 1st Earl of Harrington	November; 1744	October; 1746	– Secretary of State for the Northern Department		Henry Pelham (from 27 August 1743)
Philip Dormer Stanhope; 4th Earl of Chesterfield	October; 1746	February; 1748	– Secretary of State for the Northern Department	Whig	Henry Pelham (from 27 August 1743)
Thomas Pelham-Holles; 1st Duke of Newcastle	February; 1748	16 November 1756	– Secretary of State for the Northern Department until March 1754– Prime Minister from March 1754	Whig	Henry Pelham (from 27 August 1743)
Thomas Pelham-Holles; 1st Duke of Newcastle	February; 1748	16 November 1756	– Secretary of State for the Northern Department until March 1754– Prime Minister from March 1754	Whig	Himself
William Cavendish; 4th Duke of Devonshire	16 November 1756	25 June 1757	– Prime Minister	Whig	Himself
Thomas Pelham-Holles; 1st Duke of Newcastle	2 July 1757	26 May 1762	– Prime Minister	Whig	Himself
Charles Wyndham; 2nd Earl of Egremont	May; 1762	21 August 1763	– Secretary of State for the Southern Department		John Stuart, 3rd Earl of Bute (until April 1763)
Charles Wyndham; 2nd Earl of Egremont	May; 1762	21 August 1763	– Secretary of State for the Southern Department		George Grenville (from 16 April 1763)
George Montagu Dunk; 2nd Earl of Halifax	August; 1763	July; 1765	– Secretary of State for the Southern Department		George Grenville (from 16 April 1763)
Charles Watson-Wentworth; 2nd Marquess of Rockingham	13 July 1765	30 July 1766	– Prime Minister	Whig (Rockingham)	Himself
Augustus FitzRoy; 3rd Duke of Grafton	1766	28 January 1770	– First Lord of the Treasury – Prime Minister from October 1768	Whig (Chathamite)	William Pitt, 1st Earl of Chatham (William Pitt the Elder) (until October 1768)
Augustus FitzRoy; 3rd Duke of Grafton	1766	28 January 1770	– First Lord of the Treasury – Prime Minister from October 1768	Whig (Chathamite)	Himself (from 14 October 1768)
Thomas Thynne; 3rd Viscount Weymouth	January; 1770	December; 1770	– Secretary of State for the Southern Department		Lord North
William Nassau de Zuylestein; 4th Earl of Rochford	December; 1770	November; 1775	– Secretary of State for the Southern Department		Lord North
Henry Howard; 12th Earl of Suffolk	November; 1775	6 March 1779	– Secretary of State for the Northern Department		Lord North
Thomas Thynne; 3rd Viscount Weymouth	March; 1779	November; 1779	– Secretary of State until October 1779: Secretary of State for the Southern Department from October 1779		Lord North
David Murray; 7th Viscount Stormont	November; 1779	March; 1782	– Secretary of State for the Northern Department		Lord North
William Petty; 2nd Earl of Shelburne	March; 1782	April; 1783	– Secretary of State for the Home Department until July 1782 – Prime Minister from July 1782	Whig (Rockingham)	Charles Watson-Wentworth, 2nd Marquess of Rockingham (until 1 July 1782)
William Petty; 2nd Earl of Shelburne	March; 1782	April; 1783	– Secretary of State for the Home Department until July 1782 – Prime Minister from July 1782	Whig (Rockingham)	Himself (from 4 July 1782)
William Cavendish-Bentinck; 3rd Duke of Portland	2 April 1783	December; 1783	– Prime Minister	Whig (Foxite)	Himself (figurehead)
George Nugent-Temple-Grenville; 3rd Earl Temple	December; 1783	December; 1783	– Home Secretary – Foreign Secretary	–	William Pitt the Younger
Thomas Townshend; 1st Baron Sydney	December; 1783	June; 1789	– Home Secretary	Whig	William Pitt the Younger
Francis Osborne; 5th Duke of Leeds	1789	1790	– Secretary of State for Foreign Affairs	Tory	William Pitt the Younger
William Grenville; 1st Baron Grenville	November; 1790	February; 1801	– Secretary of State for the Home Department until June 1791 – Secretary of State for Foreign Affairs from June 1791	Tory	William Pitt the Younger
Robert Hobart; Baron Hobart	March; 1801	October; 1801	– Secretary of State for War and the Colonies	Tory	Henry Addington
Thomas Pelham; Baron Pelham	October; 1801	August; 1803	– Secretary of State for the Home Department	Tory	Henry Addington
Robert Jenkinson; Baron Hawkesbury	November; 1803	February; 1806	– Secretary of State for Foreign Affairs until May 1804 – Secretary of State for the Home Department from May 1804	Tory	Henry Addington
Robert Jenkinson; Baron Hawkesbury	November; 1803	February; 1806	– Secretary of State for Foreign Affairs until May 1804 – Secretary of State for the Home Department from May 1804	Tory	William Pitt the Younger
William Grenville; 1st Baron Grenville	11 February 1806	March; 1807	– Prime Minister	Whig	Himself (Ministry of All the Talents)
Robert Jenkinson; 2nd Earl of Liverpool; Baron Hawkesbury until 1808; Earl of Liverpool from 1808	25 March 1807	April; 1827	– Secretary of State for the Home Department until November 1809 – Secretary of State for War and the Colonies November 1809 – June 1812 – Prime Minister from June 1812	Tory	3rd Duke of Portland
Robert Jenkinson; 2nd Earl of Liverpool; Baron Hawkesbury until 1808; Earl of Liverpool from 1808	25 March 1807	April; 1827	– Secretary of State for the Home Department until November 1809 – Secretary of State for War and the Colonies November 1809 – June 1812 – Prime Minister from June 1812	Tory	Spencer Perceval
Robert Jenkinson; 2nd Earl of Liverpool; Baron Hawkesbury until 1808; Earl of Liverpool from 1808	25 March 1807	April; 1827	– Secretary of State for the Home Department until November 1809 – Secretary of State for War and the Colonies November 1809 – June 1812 – Prime Minister from June 1812	Tory	Himself
F. J. Robinson; 1st Viscount Goderich	30 April 1827	January; 1828	Secretary of State for War and the Colonies until September 1827 – Prime Minister from August 1827	Tory	George Canning
F. J. Robinson; 1st Viscount Goderich	30 April 1827	January; 1828	Secretary of State for War and the Colonies until September 1827 – Prime Minister from August 1827	Tory	Himself
Arthur Wellesley; 1st Duke of Wellington	January; 1828	November; 1830	– Prime Minister	Tory	Himself
Charles Grey; 2nd Earl Grey	22 November 1830	9 July 1834	– Prime Minister	Whig	Himself
William Lamb; 2nd Viscount Melbourne	16 July 1834	14 November 1834	– Prime Minister	Whig	Himself
Arthur Wellesley; 1st Duke of Wellington	17 November 1834	8 April 1835	– Prime Minister until December 1834 – Secretary of State for the Home Department until December 1834 – Secretary of State for War and the Colonies until December 1834 – Secretary of State for Foreign Affairs	Tory	Himself (Caretaker)
Arthur Wellesley; 1st Duke of Wellington	17 November 1834	8 April 1835	– Prime Minister until December 1834 – Secretary of State for the Home Department until December 1834 – Secretary of State for War and the Colonies until December 1834 – Secretary of State for Foreign Affairs	Tory	Robert Peel
William Lamb; 2nd Viscount Melbourne	18 April 1835	30 August 1841	– Prime Minister	Whig	Himself
Arthur Wellesley; 1st Duke of Wellington	3 September 1841	27 June 1846	– Minister without portfolio	Conservative	Robert Peel
Henry Petty-Fitzmaurice; 3rd Marquess of Lansdowne	6 July 1846	21 February 1852	– Lord President of the Council	Whig	Lord John Russell
Edward Smith-Stanley; 14th Earl of Derby	23 February 1852	17 December 1852	– Prime Minister	Conservative	Himself
George Hamilton-Gordon; 4th Earl of Aberdeen	19 December 1852	30 January 1855	– Prime Minister	Peelite	Himself (Coalition)
Granville Leveson-Gower; 2nd Earl Granville	8 February 1855	21 February 1858	– Lord President of the Council	Whig	Henry John Temple, 3rd Viscount Palmerston
Edward Smith-Stanley; 14th Earl of Derby	21 February 1858	11 June 1859	– Prime Minister	Conservative	Himself
Granville Leveson-Gower; 2nd Earl Granville	18 June 1859	29 October 1865	– Lord President of the Council	Liberal	Viscount Palmerston
John Russell; 1st Earl Russell	29 October 1865	26 June 1866	– Prime Minister	Liberal	Himself
Edward Smith-Stanley; 14th Earl of Derby	28 June 1866	25 February 1868	– Prime Minister	Conservative	Himself
James Harris; 3rd Earl of Malmesbury	27 February 1868	1 December 1868	– Lord Keeper of the Privy Seal	Conservative	Benjamin Disraeli
Granville Leveson-Gower; 2nd Earl Granville	9 December 1868	17 February 1874	– Secretary of State for the Colonies until July 1870 – Secretary of State for Foreign Affairs from July 1870	Liberal	William Ewart Gladstone
Charles Gordon-Lennox; 6th Duke of Richmond	21 February 1874	21 August 1876	– Lord President of the Council	Conservative	Benjamin Disraeli
Benjamin Disraeli; 1st Earl of Beaconsfield	21 August 1876	21 April 1880	– Prime Minister – Lord Keeper of the Privy Seal from August 1876 until February 1878	Conservative	Benjamin Disraeli
Granville Leveson-Gower; 2nd Earl Granville	28 April 1880	9 June 1885	– Secretary of State for Foreign Affairs	Liberal	William Ewart Gladstone
Robert Gascoyne-Cecil; 3rd Marquess of Salisbury	23 June 1885	28 January 1886	– Prime Minister – Secretary of State for Foreign Affairs	Conservative	Himself
Granville Leveson-Gower; 2nd Earl Granville	6 February 1886	20 July 1886	– Secretary of State for the Colonies	Liberal	William Ewart Gladstone
Robert Gascoyne-Cecil; 2nd Marquess of Salisbury	25 July 1886	11 August 1892	– Prime Minister – Secretary of State for Foreign Affairs from January 1887	Conservative	Himself
John Wodehouse; 1st Earl of Kimberley	18 August 1892	5 March 1894	– Lord President of the Council	Liberal	William Ewart Gladstone
Archibald Primrose; 5th Earl of Rosebery	5 March 1894	21 June 1895	– Prime Minister	Liberal	Himself
Robert Gascoyne-Cecil; 3rd Marquess of Salisbury	25 June 1895	11 July 1902	– Prime Minister – Secretary of State for Foreign Affairs until November 1900 – Lord Keeper of the Privy Seal from 12 November 1900	Conservative	Himself
Spencer Cavendish; 8th Duke of Devonshire	12 July 1902	13 October 1903	– Lord President of the Council	Liberal Unionist	Arthur Balfour (Conservative)
Henry Petty-Fitzmaurice; 5th Marquess of Lansdowne	13 October 1903	4 December 1905	– Secretary of State for Foreign Affairs	Liberal Unionist	Arthur Balfour (Conservative)
George Robinson; 1st Marquess of Ripon	10 December 1905	14 April 1908	– Lord Keeper of the Privy Seal	Liberal	Henry Campbell-Bannerman
Robert Crewe-Milnes; 1st Marquess of Crewe; Earl of Crewe until 1911; Marquess of Crewe from 1911	14 April 1908	10 December 1916	– Secretary of State for the Colonies May 1908– November 1910 – Lord Keeper of the Privy SealOctober 1908 – October 1911; February 1912 – May 1915 – Secretary of State for India November 1910 – March 1911; May 1911 – May 1915 – Lord President of the Council from May 1915 – President of the Board of Education from August 1916	Liberal	H. H. Asquith
George Curzon; 1st Marquess Curzon of Kedleston; Earl Curzon of Kedleston until 1921; Marquess Curzon of Kedleston from 1921	10 December 1916	22 January 1924	– Lord President of the Council until October 1919 – Secretary of State for Foreign Affairs from October 1919	Conservative	David Lloyd George (Liberal)
George Curzon; 1st Marquess Curzon of Kedleston; Earl Curzon of Kedleston until 1921; Marquess Curzon of Kedleston from 1921	10 December 1916	22 January 1924	– Lord President of the Council until October 1919 – Secretary of State for Foreign Affairs from October 1919	Conservative	Bonar Law
George Curzon; 1st Marquess Curzon of Kedleston; Earl Curzon of Kedleston until 1921; Marquess Curzon of Kedleston from 1921	10 December 1916	22 January 1924	– Lord President of the Council until October 1919 – Secretary of State for Foreign Affairs from October 1919	Conservative	Stanley Baldwin
Richard Haldane; 1st Viscount Haldane	22 January 1924	3 November 1924	– Lord High Chancellor of Great Britain	Labour	Ramsay MacDonald
George Curzon; 1st Marquess Curzon of Kedleston	3 November 1924	20 March 1925	– Lord President of the Council	Conservative	Stanley Baldwin
James Gascoyne-Cecil; 4th Marquess of Salisbury	27 April 1925	4 June 1929	– Lord Keeper of the Privy Seal	Conservative	Stanley Baldwin
Charles Cripps; 1st Baron Parmoor	7 June 1929	24 August 1931	– Lord President of the Council	Labour	Ramsay MacDonald
Rufus Isaacs; 1st Marquess of Reading	24 August 1931	5 November 1931	– Secretary of State for Foreign Affairs	Liberal	Ramsay MacDonald
Douglas Hogg; 1st Viscount Hailsham	5 November 1931	7 June 1935	– Secretary of State for War	Conservative	Ramsay MacDonald
Charles Vane-Tempest-Stewart; 7th Marquess of Londonderry	7 June 1935	22 November 1935	– Lord Keeper of the Privy Seal	Conservative	Stanley Baldwin
Edward Wood; 3rd Viscount Halifax	22 November 1935	21 February 1938	– Lord Keeper of the Privy Seal until May 1937 – Lord President of the Council from 28 May 1937	Conservative	Stanley Baldwin
Edward Wood; 3rd Viscount Halifax	22 November 1935	21 February 1938	– Lord Keeper of the Privy Seal until May 1937 – Lord President of the Council from 28 May 1937	Conservative	Neville Chamberlain
James Stanhope; 7th Earl Stanhope	21 February 1938	14 May 1940	– President of the Board of Education until October 1938 – First Lord of the Admiralty October 1938 to September 1939 – Lord President of the Council September 1939 to May 1940	Conservative	Neville Chamberlain
Thomas Inskip; 1st Viscount Caldecote	14 May 1940	3 October 1940	– Secretary of State for Dominion Affairs	Conservative	Winston Churchill
Edward Wood; 1st Viscount Halifax	3 October 1940	22 December 1940	– Secretary of State for Foreign Affairs	Conservative	Winston Churchill
George Lloyd; 1st Baron Lloyd	22 December 1940	4 February 1941	– Secretary of State for the Colonies	Conservative	Winston Churchill
Walter Guinness; 1st Baron Moyne	8 February 1941	21 February 1942	– Secretary of State for the Colonies	Conservative	Winston Churchill
Robert Gascoyne-Cecil; Viscount Cranborne	21 February 1942	26 July 1945	– Secretary of State for the Colonies to November 1942 – Lord Keeper of the Privy Seal November 1942 to September 1943 – Secretary of State for Dominion Affairs September 1943 to 1945	Conservative	Winston Churchill
Christopher Addison; 1st Viscount Addison	3 August 1945	26 October 1951	– Secretary of State for Dominion Affairs until July 1947 – Secretary of State for Commonwealth Relations July 1947 – October 1947 – Lord Keeper of the Privy Seal October 1947 – March 1951 – Paymaster General July 1948– April 1949 – Lord President of the Council from March 1951	Labour	Clement Attlee
Robert Gascoyne-Cecil; 5th Marquess of Salisbury	28 October 1951	29 March 1957	– Lord Keeper of the Privy Seal until May 1952 – Secretary of State for Commonwealth Relations March 1952– November 1952 – Lord President of the Council from November 1952	Conservative	Winston Churchill
Robert Gascoyne-Cecil; 5th Marquess of Salisbury	28 October 1951	29 March 1957	– Lord Keeper of the Privy Seal until May 1952 – Secretary of State for Commonwealth Relations March 1952– November 1952 – Lord President of the Council from November 1952	Conservative	Anthony Eden
Alec Douglas-Home; 14th Earl of Home	29 March 1957	27 July 1960	– Secretary of State for Commonwealth Relations – Lord President of the Council until September 1957; from October 1959	Conservative	Harold Macmillan
Quintin Hogg; 2nd Viscount Hailsham	27 July 1960	20 October 1963	– Lord President of the Council – Minister for Science	Conservative	Harold Macmillan
Peter Carington; 6th Baron Carrington	20 October 1963	16 October 1964	– Minister without portfolio	Conservative	Alec Douglas-Home
Frank Pakenham; 7th Earl of Longford	18 October 1964	16 January 1968	– Lord Keeper of the Privy Sealuntil December 1965; from April 1966 – Secretary of State for the Colonies December 1965 – April 1966	Labour	Harold Wilson
Edward Shackleton; Baron Shackleton	16 January 1968	19 June 1970	– Lord Keeper of the Privy Seal until April 1968; from October 1968 – Paymaster General April 1968 – November 1968	Labour	Harold Wilson
George Jellicoe; 2nd Earl Jellicoe	20 June 1970	23 May 1973	– Lord Keeper of the Privy Seal	Conservative	Edward Heath
David Hennessy; 3rd Baron Windlesham	5 June 1973	4 March 1974	– Lord Keeper of the Privy Seal	Conservative	Edward Heath
Malcolm Shepherd; 2nd Baron Shepherd	7 March 1974	10 September 1976	– Lord Keeper of the Privy Seal	Labour	Harold Wilson
Malcolm Shepherd; 2nd Baron Shepherd	7 March 1974	10 September 1976	– Lord Keeper of the Privy Seal	Labour	James Callaghan
Fred Peart; Baron Peart	10 September 1976	4 May 1979	– Lord Keeper of the Privy Seal	Labour	James Callaghan
Christopher Soames; Baron Soames	5 May 1979	14 September 1981	– Lord President of the Council	Conservative	Margaret Thatcher
Janet Young; Baroness Young	14 September 1981	11 June 1983	– Chancellor of the Duchy of Lancaster until April 1982 – Lord Keeper of the Privy Seal from April 1982	Conservative	Margaret Thatcher
William Whitelaw; 1st Viscount Whitelaw	11 June 1983	10 January 1988	– Lord President of the Council	Conservative	Margaret Thatcher
John Ganzoni; 2nd Baron Belstead	10 January 1988	28 November 1990	– Lord Keeper of the Privy Seal	Conservative	Margaret Thatcher
David Waddington; Baron Waddington	28 November 1990	11 April 1992	– Lord Keeper of the Privy Seal	Conservative	John Major
John Wakeham; Baron Wakeham	11 April 1992	20 July 1994	– Lord Keeper of the Privy Seal	Conservative	John Major
Robert Gascoyne-Cecil; Viscount Cranborne	20 July 1994	2 May 1997	– Lord Keeper of the Privy Seal	Conservative	John Major
Ivor Richard; Baron Richard	2 May 1997	27 July 1998	– Lord Keeper of the Privy Seal	Labour	Tony Blair
Margaret Jay; Baroness Jay of Paddington	27 July 1998	8 June 2001	– Lord Keeper of the Privy Seal – Minister for Women	Labour	Tony Blair
Gareth Williams; Baron Williams of Mostyn	8 June 2001	20 September 2003	– Lord Keeper of the Privy Seal until June 2003 – Lord President of the Council from June 2003	Labour	Tony Blair
Valerie Amos; Baroness Amos	6 October 2003	28 June 2007	– Lord President of the Council	Labour	Tony Blair
Catherine Ashton; Baroness Ashton of Upholland	28 June 2007	2 October 2008	– Lord President of the Council	Labour	Gordon Brown
Janet Royall; Baroness Royall of Blaisdon	2 October 2008	11 May 2010	– Lord President of the Council until June 2009 – Chancellor of the Duchy of Lancaster from June 2009	Labour	Gordon Brown
Thomas Galbraith; 2nd Baron Strathclyde	12 May 2010	7 January 2013	– Chancellor of the Duchy of Lancaster	Conservative	David Cameron
Jonathan Hill; Baron Hill of Oareford	7 January 2013	15 July 2014	– Chancellor of the Duchy of Lancaster	Conservative	David Cameron
Tina Stowell; Baroness Stowell of Beeston	15 July 2014	14 July 2016	– Lord Keeper of the Privy Seal	Conservative	David Cameron
Natalie Evans; Baroness Evans of Bowes Park	14 July 2016	6 September 2022	– Lord Keeper of the Privy Seal	Conservative	Theresa May
Natalie Evans; Baroness Evans of Bowes Park	14 July 2016	6 September 2022	– Lord Keeper of the Privy Seal	Conservative	Boris Johnson
Nicholas True; Baron True	6 September 2022	5 July 2024	– Lord Keeper of the Privy Seal	Conservative	Liz Truss
Nicholas True; Baron True	6 September 2022	5 July 2024	– Lord Keeper of the Privy Seal	Conservative	Rishi Sunak
Angela Smith; Baroness Smith of Basildon	5 July 2024	Incumbent	– Lord Keeper of the Privy Seal	Labour	Keir Starmer
Angela Smith; Baroness Smith of Basildon	5 July 2024	Incumbent	– Lord Keeper of the Privy Seal	Labour	Andy Burnham

== Deputy Leaders ==
The following peers have served as Deputy Leaders of the House of Lords since 1963:

Leader	Term start	Term end	Other ministerial offices held as Deputy Leader of the House of Lords	Political party	Prime Minister
John Hare, 1st Viscount Blakenham	October 1963	October 1964	– Chancellor of the Duchy of Lancaster	Conservative	Alec Douglas-Home
Arthur Champion, Baron Champion	21 October 1964	7 January 1967	– Minister without portfolio	Labour	Harold Wilson
Edward Shackleton, Baron Shackleton	7 January 1967	16 January 1968	– Minister without portfolio	Labour	Harold Wilson
Malcolm Shepherd, 2nd Baron Shepherd	February 1968	June 1970	– Minister of State for Commonwealth Affairs (1968) – Minister of State for Foreign and Commonwealth Affairs (1968–70)	Labour	Harold Wilson
Morys Bruce, 4th Baron Aberdare	1970	1974	– Minister of State for Health and Social Security	Conservative	Edward Heath
Frank Beswick, Baron Beswick	February 1974	December 1975	– Minister of State for Industry	Labour	Harold Wilson
Goronwy Roberts, Baron Goronwy-Roberts	December 1975	May 1979	– Minister of State for Foreign and Commonwealth Affairs	Labour	Harold Wilson
Goronwy Roberts, Baron Goronwy-Roberts	December 1975	May 1979	– Minister of State for Foreign and Commonwealth Affairs	Labour	James Callaghan
Robert Shirley, 13th Earl Ferrers	November 1979	May 1983	– Minister of State for Agriculture, Fisheries and Food	Conservative	Margaret Thatcher
John Ganzoni, 2nd Baron Belstead	June 1983	January 1988	– Minister of State for Agriculture, Fisheries and Food (1983–87) – Minister of State for Environment (1987–88)	Conservative	Margaret Thatcher
Robert Shirley, 13th Earl Ferrers	January 1988	May 1997	– Minister of State for Home Affairs (1988–94) – Minister of State for Consumer Affairs (1994–95) – Minister of State for Environment and Countryside (1995–97)	Conservative	Margaret Thatcher
Robert Shirley, 13th Earl Ferrers	January 1988	May 1997	– Minister of State for Home Affairs (1988–94) – Minister of State for Consumer Affairs (1994–95) – Minister of State for Environment and Countryside (1995–97)	Conservative	John Major
Margaret Jay, Baroness Jay of Paddington	2 May 1997	27 July 1998	– Minister of State for Health	Labour	Tony Blair
Gareth Williams, Baron Williams of Mostyn	October 1998	June 2001	– Parliamentary Under-Secretary of State for Home Affairs (1997–98) – Minister of State for Prisons (1998–99) – Attorney General for England and Wales (1999–2001) – Attorney General for Northern Ireland (1999–2001)	Labour	Tony Blair
Elizabeth Symons, Baroness Symons of Vernham Dean	8 June 2001	6 June 2005	– Minister of State for Trade and Investment (2001–03) – Minister of State for the Middle East (2001–05)	Labour	Tony Blair
Jeff Rooker, Baron Rooker	6 June 2005	5 October 2008	– Minister of State for Children in Northern Ireland (2005–06) – Minister of State for Sustainable Food, Farming and Animal Health (2006–08)	Labour	Tony Blair
Jeff Rooker, Baron Rooker	6 June 2005	5 October 2008	– Minister of State for Children in Northern Ireland (2005–06) – Minister of State for Sustainable Food, Farming and Animal Health (2006–08)	Labour	Gordon Brown
Philip Hunt, Baron Hunt of Kings Heath	5 October 2008	11 May 2010	– Minister of State for Sustainable Development, Climate Change Adaptation and Air Quality	Labour	Gordon Brown
Tom McNally, Baron McNally	13 May 2010	15 October 2013	– Minister of State for Justice	Liberal Democrat	David Cameron
Jim Wallace, Baron Wallace of Tankerness	15 October 2013	8 May 2015	– Advocate General for Scotland	Liberal Democrat	David Cameron
Frederick Curzon, 7th Earl Howe	12 May 2015	5 July 2024	– Minister of State for Defence (2015–19)	Conservative	David Cameron
Frederick Curzon, 7th Earl Howe	12 May 2015	5 July 2024	– Minister of State for Defence (2015–19)	Conservative	Theresa May
Frederick Curzon, 7th Earl Howe	12 May 2015	5 July 2024	– Minister of State for Defence (2015–19)	Conservative	Boris Johnson
Frederick Curzon, 7th Earl Howe	12 May 2015	5 July 2024	– Minister of State for Defence (2015–19)	Conservative	Liz Truss
Frederick Curzon, 7th Earl Howe	12 May 2015	5 July 2024	– Minister of State for Defence (2015–19)	Conservative	Rishi Sunak
Ray Collins, Baron Collins of Highbury	9 July 2024	Incumbent	– Lord-in-waiting – Parliamentary Under-Secretary of State for Africa – Parliamentary Under-Secretary of State for the Home Department – Parliamentary Under-Secretary of State for Equalities	Labour	Keir Starmer
Ray Collins, Baron Collins of Highbury	9 July 2024	Incumbent	– Lord-in-waiting – Parliamentary Under-Secretary of State for Africa – Parliamentary Under-Secretary of State for the Home Department – Parliamentary Under-Secretary of State for Equalities	Labour	Andy Burnham

== See also ==
- House of Lords
- Leader of the House of Commons
