= 2012 British cabinet reshuffle =

UK cabinet reshuffle undertaken by David Cameron

David Cameron

British prime minister David Cameron conducted the first major reshuffle of his coalition government on 4 September 2012. The reshuffle, nearly two and a half years after the government was sworn in, was highly anticipated, and eschewed the trend of annual reshuffles which had become common under the governments of the 1990s and 2000s. As a result, many ministers had been in place not just since the government was elected in 2010, but had covered the portfolio in Cameron's shadow cabinet or even earlier; Andrew Lansley had covered the health brief since 2004, when Michael Howard led the Conservatives in opposition.

Despite this, Cameron's room to manoeuvre was limited by his coalition agreement with Deputy Prime Minister Nick Clegg's Liberal Democrats, which guaranteed the minority party seats in government, and Clegg the right to select his ministers. Further, Cameron's personal aversion to reshuffles and belief that ministers were most effective when given time at a department led to him viewing many cabinet members, including the holders of the Great Offices of State, as immovable.

The reshuffle, which was criticised by the opposition for resulting in a cabinet with only four female members out of twenty-two, ultimately shifted Cameron's government significantly to the right on business, justice, and the environment, and rid the government of perceived weaknesses, while maintaining stability at the top. In an official statement, Number 10 stated that the impetus for the reshuffle was that after more than two years, the government was "at the delivery phase" and that ministers had "been appointed with that in mind".

== Changes in the ministry ==
Individual	Party	Position before reshuffle	Result of Reshuffle
Rt Hon Kenneth Clarke QC MP	Conservative	Lord Chancellor; Secretary of State for Justice	Made Minister without portfolio.
Rt Hon Chris Grayling MP	Conservative	Minister of State for Employment	Promoted to Lord Chancellor and Secretary of State for Justice
Rt Hon Cheryl Gillan MP	Conservative	Secretary of State for Wales	Sacked, returned to backbenches.
Rt Hon Justine Greening MP	Conservative	Secretary of State for Transport	Moved to Secretary of State for International Development
Rt Hon Jeremy Hunt MP	Conservative	Secretary of State for Culture, Media and Sport	Promoted to Secretary of State for Health
David Jones MP	Conservative	Parliamentary Under-Secretary of State for Wales	Promoted to Secretary of State for Wales and appointed to the Privy Council
Rt Hon Andrew Lansley MP	Conservative	Secretary of State for Health	Became Leader of the House of Commons and Lord Privy Seal
Rt Hon David Laws MP	Liberal Democrat	Backbencher	Promoted to Minister of State for Education and the Cabinet Office, with right to attend cabinet
Rt Hon Patrick McLoughlin MP	Conservative	Chief Whip	Promoted to Secretary of State for Transport
Maria Miller MP	Conservative	Parliamentary Under-Secretary of State for Disabled People	Promoted to Secretary of State for Culture, Media and Sport and appointed to the Privy Council
Rt Hon Andrew Mitchell MP	Conservative	Secretary of State for International Development	Became Chief Whip
Rt Hon Owen Paterson MP	Conservative	Secretary of State for Northern Ireland	Promoted to Secretary of State for Environment, Food and Rural Affairs
Rt Hon Grant Shapps MP	Conservative	Minister of State for Housing and Planning	Promoted to Chairman of the Conservative Party and Minister without portfolio
Rt Hon Caroline Spelman MP	Conservative	Secretary of State for Environment, Food and Rural Affairs	Sacked, returned to backbenches.
Rt Hon Theresa Villiers MP	Conservative	Minister of State for Transport	Promoted to Secretary of State for Northern Ireland
Rt Hon Baroness Warsi PC	Conservative	Chairman of the Conservative Party; Minister without portfolio	Demoted to Senior Minister of State for Foreign and Commonwealth Affairs
Rt Hon Sir George Young Bt MP	Conservative	Leader of the House of Commons and Lord Privy Seal	Retired to backbenches and made a Companion of Honour.

== Significant events ==
=== Grayling replaces Clarke as Lord Chancellor ===
Kenneth Clarke, who had served in every Conservative government since Edward Heath made him an Assistant Whip in 1972, retired as Lord Chancellor at the age of 72 after two years, becoming an advisory Minister without portfolio with the right to attend cabinet, the National Security Council, and the important cabinet economic sub-committee. Clarke, who declined Cameron's offer of the Leadership of the House of Commons, explained that when Cameron asked him to become Shadow Business Secretary in 2009, the men agreed that he would serve in the cabinet for two years, and that "At my age, it is time for me to step back from the slog of running a large department, but I am delighted to have been given a more advisory political role". Despite no longer being Lord Chancellor, Clarke maintained responsibility for passage of the Justice and Security Act as Minister without portfolio.

Clarke's retirement from departmental office was viewed as a positive for both right-wingers and Eurosceptics in the Conservative Party, as Clarke was viewed as the Tories' most outspoken Europhile, and had been known as a liberal wet for decades. Clarke was replaced as Lord Chancellor by Chris Grayling, a Eurosceptic who was also considered far less friendly to both the Human Rights Act and European Convention on Human Rights, both constant sources of scorn amongst grassroots Tories. It was also believed that the move would be advantageous to Home Secretary Theresa May, who had sparred with Clarke over the Human Rights Act during "catgate" during the previous October's Conservative Party Conference, and believed to be much closer in ideology to Grayling.

Grayling was initially intended to replace Iain Duncan Smith, his immediate superior as Employment Minister, as Work and Pensions Secretary after Duncan Smith was moved to Lord Chancellor. When Duncan Smith resisted this, insisting that he be allowed to remain due to a fear that his Universal Credit scheme would be watered down by George Osborne's Treasury in his absence, Cameron decided instead to promote Grayling and leave Duncan Smith in place, leading to accusations of weakness from Labour's Shadow Cabinet Office Minister, Michael Dugher.

Grayling's appointment proved immediately controversial due to the fact that he was the first non-lawyer to become Lord Chancellor in centuries. This led to questioning of his ability to adequately perform his functions, such as building relationships with members of the judiciary, and of further politicisation of the judiciary, with Joshua Rozenberg, a popular legal commentator and Queen's Counsel, writing in the Guardian that his "main qualifications are that he is perceived to be right-wing and once shadowed prisons".

Clarke's departmental retirement was met with sadness from many justice related pressure groups, including the Howard League for Penal Reform, which called him a "breath of fresh air", and even from the former Labour First Minister of Scotland, Jack McConnell, who said that he would have merged the Scotland, Wales and Northern Ireland Offices and made Clarke "Secretary of State for Nations" if he were Prime Minister.

=== McLoughlin replaces Greening at transport ===
Justine Greening's lateral move from Transport Secretary to International Development was predicted by many, and sparked a late August "Battle for Justine" campaign amongst West London residents, who saw her removal as a shift in government policy in favour of a third runway at Heathrow Airport. Greening, who represents a London constituency, was reported to have responded furiously to the demotion, having "shouted" at Cameron. Greening was replaced by Patrick McLoughlin, the Chief Whip, who represented a constituency in Derbyshire and was "open" to Heathrow development.

Boris Johnson, the Tory Mayor of London and perceived challenger to Cameron, attacked the move, calling Greening a "first rate Transportation Secretary" and saying that the "only reason" for it would be to clear a hurdle to building a third runway. Zac Goldsmith, a backbench London Conservative MP, went even further in attacking Cameron for the apparent U-turn, saying that "real leadership requires clarity" and that the move reflected "panic, not principle".

== See also ==
- 2014 British cabinet reshuffle
- Premiership of David Cameron
