= 1973 Ceredigion District Council election =

1973 Welsh local election

The first election to Ceredigion District Council was held in April 1973. It was followed by the 1976 election. On the same day there were elections to the other District local authorities and community councils in Wales.

== Results ==
=== Aberaeron (one seat) ===
Aberaeron 1973
Party	Candidate	Votes	%	±%
Independent	Thomas Glyn Griffiths Herbert	590	75.7	
Independent	A. Thomas	189	24.3	
Majority			51.4	
Turnout				
Independent win (new seat)				

=== Aberbanc (one seat) ===
Aberbanc 1973
Party	Candidate	Votes	%	±%
Independent	R. Davies	403	41.5	
Independent	E. Davies	298	30.7	
Independent	B. Llewellyn	269	27.7	
Majority			10.8	
Turnout			75.7	
Independent win (new seat)				

=== Aberporth (one seat) ===
Aberporth 1973
Party	Candidate	Votes	%	±%
Independent	J.L. Davies	498	44.0	
Independent	H. Spurrell	344	30.4	
Independent	T. Lewis	291	25.7	
Majority			13.6	
Turnout			63.5	
Independent win (new seat)				

=== Aberystwyth Ward One (four seats) ===
Aberystwyth Ward One 1973
Party	Candidate	Votes	%	±%
Independent	R. Davies	1,371	44.0	
Independent Labour	Gareth Ellis	1,143		
Labour	J. Edwards	829		
Labour	Owen Henry Jones	583		
Plaid Cymru	R. Roberts	568		
Labour	K. Burgess	514		
Labour	G. Parry	441		
Turnout				
Independent win (new seat)				
Independent Labour win (new seat)				
Labour win (new seat)				
Labour win (new seat)				

=== Aberystwyth Ward Two (two seats) ===
Aberystwyth Ward Two 1973
Party	Candidate	Votes	%	±%
Independent	J. Edwards	502		
Liberal	Miss K.A. Jones	487		
Labour	T. Jones	402		
Liberal	D. Davies	304		
Labour	C. Edwards	293		
Turnout			60.6	
Independent win (new seat)				
Liberal win (new seat)				

=== Aberystwyth Ward Three (two seats) ===
Aberystwyth Ward Three 1973
Party	Candidate	Votes	%	±%
Liberal	M. Jones	1,178		
Liberal	H. Williams	684		
Independent	Hywel Griffiths Evans	464		
Turnout			56.5	
Liberal win (new seat)				
Liberal win (new seat)				

=== Aeron (one seat) ===
Aeron 1973
Party	Candidate	Votes	%	±%
Independent	T. Jones	229	37.1	
Independent	T. Jones	225	37.1	
Independent	J. Richards	164	26.5	
Majority		4	0.0	
Turnout			68.7	
Independent win (new seat)				

=== Borth (one seat) ===
Borth 1973
Party	Candidate	Votes	%	±%
Independent	William Thomas Kinsey Raw-Rees	574	68.1	
Independent	J. Jeremy	269	31.9	
Majority			36.2	
Turnout			63.3	
Independent win (new seat)				

=== Bow Street (one seat) ===
This ward was also known as Llangorwen.

Bow Street 1973
Party	Candidate	Votes	%	±%
Independent	J. Rees	344	60.4	
Liberal	A. Jones	226	39.6	
Majority			20.7	
Turnout			58.5	
Independent win (new seat)				

=== Cardigan (three seats) ===
Cardigan 1973
Party	Candidate	Votes	%	±%
Independent	O.M. Owen	983		
Liberal	W. Jenkins	950		
Independent	F. Aspinall	704		
Labour	T. Phillips	689		
Plaid Cymru	D. Williams	644		
Labour	T. Lloyd	580		
Majority				
Turnout				
Independent win (new seat)				
Liberal win (new seat)				
Independent win (new seat)				

=== Cwmrheidol and Devils' Bridge (one seat) ===
Cwmrheidol and Devils' Bridge 1973
Party	Candidate	Votes	%	±%
Independent	G. Lewis	211		
Independent	E. Evans	168		
Independent	W. Morgan	55		
Labour	E. Daniel	42		
Majority				
Turnout				
Independent win (new seat)				

=== Faenor Upper (one seat) ===
Faenor Upper 1973
Party	Candidate	Votes	%	±%
Independent	M.B. Roberts	unopposed		
Majority				
Turnout				
Independent win (new seat)				

=== Felinfach (one seat) ===
Felinfach 1973
Party	Candidate	Votes	%	±%
Independent	William Ainsleigh Jones	453	51.9	
Independent	J. Davies	240	27.5	
Plaid Cymru	S. Morgan	179	20.5	
Majority			24.4	
Turnout				
Independent win (new seat)				

=== Lampeter (two seats) ===
Lampeter 1973
Party	Candidate	Votes	%	±%
Liberal	Mrs C.P. Barton	379		
Liberal	R. Hughes	348		
Independent	F. Roberts	345		
Independent	D. Jenkins	332		
Independent	F. Samuel	263		
Labour	D. Owen	246		
Independent	D. Davies	192		
Independent	L. Paskins	102		
Turnout			59.5	
Liberal win (new seat)				
Liberal win (new seat)				

=== Llanarth (one seat) ===
Llanarth 1973
Party	Candidate	Votes	%	±%
Independent	B. Jenkins	444	62.0	
Independent	D. Jenkins	272	38.0	
Majority				
Turnout				
Independent win (new seat)				

=== Llanbadarn Fawr (one seat) ===
Llanbadarn Fawr 1973
Party	Candidate	Votes	%	±%
Independent	J.E. Raw-Rees	304		
Labour	J. Jones	228		
Majority				
Turnout				
Independent win (new seat)				

=== Llandygwydd (one seat) ===
Llandygwydd 1973
Party	Candidate	Votes	%	±%
Independent	D. Beynon	196		
Independent	I. James	130		
Independent	C. Richards	105		
Majority				
Turnout				
Independent win (new seat)				

=== Llandysul North (one seat) ===
Llandysul North 1973
Party	Candidate	Votes	%	±%
Independent	Thomas John Jones	409		
Plaid Cymru	Cynog Glyndwr Davies	132		
Majority				
Turnout				
Independent win (new seat)				

=== Llandysul South (one seat) ===
Llandysul South 1973
Party	Candidate	Votes	%	±%
Independent	J. Evans	468		
Independent	D. Evans	453		
Majority		15		
Turnout				
Independent win (new seat)				

=== Llanfair and Llanwnen (one seat) ===
Llanfair and Llanwnen 1973
Party	Candidate	Votes	%	±%
Independent	Johnny Williams	498		
Plaid Cymru	W. Lewis	367		
Majority		131		
Turnout				
Independent win (new seat)				

=== Llanfarian (one seat) ===
This ward was also known as Llanychaiarn.

Llanfarian 1973
Party	Candidate	Votes	%	±%
Labour	Arthur Morgan	235	45.7	
Independent	J. Thomas	144	28.0	
Liberal	D. Vaughan	135	26.3	
Majority			17.7	
Turnout			56.3	
Labour win (new seat)				

=== Llanfihangel and Llanilar (one seat) ===
Llanfihangel and Llanilar 1973
Party	Candidate	Votes	%	±%
Independent	D. Morgan	466	56.6	
Liberal	Ll.D. Jones	358	43.4	
Majority			13.1	
Turnout				
Independent win (new seat)				

=== Llangeitho and Caron Isclawdd (one seat) ===
This ward was also known as Llanbadarn Odwyn.

Llangeitho and Caron Isclawdd 1973
Party	Candidate	Votes	%	±%
Liberal	W.G. Bennett	507	57.9	
Independent	J. Davies	369	42.1	
Majority			15.8	
Turnout				
Independent win (new seat)				

=== Llangoedmor (one seat) ===
Llangoedmor 1973
Party	Candidate	Votes	%	±%
Independent	I.J. Griffiths	338		
Plaid Cymru	P. Hazzelby	257		
Majority				
Turnout				
Independent win (new seat)				

=== Llangrannog and Penbryn (one seat) ===
Llangrannog and Penbryn 1973
Party	Candidate	Votes	%	±%
Independent	M. Jenkins	445		
Independent	Y. Brown	395		
Majority				
Turnout				
Independent win (new seat)				

=== Llanilar and Llanrhystud (one seat) ===
Llanilar and Llanrhystud 1973
Party	Candidate	Votes	%	±%
Liberal	E. Jones	unopposed		
Liberal win (new seat)				

=== Llanllwchaiarn and Llandysiliogogo (one seat) ===
Llanllwchaiarn and Llandysiliogogo 1973
Party	Candidate	Votes	%	±%
Independent	T. Jones	266		
Independent	J.E. Evans	216		
Independent	G. Jones	195		
Independent	H. Jones	103		
Majority				
Turnout				
Independent win (new seat)				

=== Llansantffraid and Cilcennin (one seat) ===
Llansantffraid and Cilcennin 1973
Party	Candidate	Votes	%	±%
Independent	L. Lloyd	657		
Independent	E. Jones	261		
Independent	M. Jarman	121		
Majority				
Turnout				
Independent win (new seat)				

=== Llanwenog (one seat) ===
Llanwenog 1973
Party	Candidate	Votes	%	±%
Independent	David Alun James	394	55.2	
Independent	R. Davies	320	44.8	
Majority			10.4	
Turnout				
Independent win (new seat)				

=== Lledrod, Strata Florida and Ysbyty Ystwyth (one seat) ===
This ward was also known as Ystwyth.

Lledrod, Strata Florida and Ysbyty Ystwyth 1973
Party	Candidate	Votes	%	±%
Independent	David Lloyd Evans	383	36.9	
Labour	J. Hedger	296	28.5	
Independent	E. James	265	25.5	
Independent	D. Owen	94	9.1	
Majority			8.4	
Turnout				
Independent win (new seat)				

=== Nantcwnlle, Llanddewi Brefi and Llangeitho (one seat) ===
This ward was also known as Gartheli.

Nantcwnlle, Llanddewi Brefi and Llangeitho 1973
Party	Candidate	Votes	%	±%
Liberal	E. Williams	520	58.9	
Independent	C. Jones	363	41.1	
Majority			17.8	
Turnout				
Liberal win (new seat)				

=== New Quay (one seat) ===
New Quay 1973
Party	Candidate	Votes	%	±%
Independent	I.C. Pursey	191	34.0	
Independent	T. Edwards	170	30.2	
Independent	J. Davies	108	19.2	
Independent	W. Thomas	93	16.5	
Majority		21	3.7	
Turnout			90.4	
Independent win (new seat)				

=== Taliesin and Talybont (one seat) ===
This ward was also known as Llancynfelyn

Taliesin and Talybont 1973
Party	Candidate	Votes	%	±%
Independent	John Rowland Davies	564	61.8	
Labour	J. Hirst	227	24.9	
Plaid Cymru	M. Evans	121	13.3	
Majority				
Turnout				
Independent win (new seat)				

=== Trefeurig and Goginan (one seat) ===
This ward was also known as Melindwr.

Trefeurig and Goginan 1973
Party	Candidate	Votes	%	±%
Independent	J. Jones	259	36.7	
Labour	G. Potter	176	25.0	
Plaid Cymru	A. Griffiths	152	21.6	
Liberal	J. Thomas	118	16.7	
Majority			11.8	
Turnout			69.4	
Independent win (new seat)				

=== Troedyraur (one seat) ===
Troedyraur 1973
Party	Candidate	Votes	%	±%
Independent	H. Jones	unopposed		
Independent win (new seat)				
