= 1976 Ceredigion District Council election =

1976 Welsh local election

The second election to Ceredigion District Council was held in May 1976. It was preceded by the 1973 election and followed by the 1979 election. On the same day there were elections to the other district and community councils in Wales.

== Results ==
=== Aberaeron (one seat) ===
Aberaeron 1976
Party	Candidate	Votes	%	±%
Independent	Thomas Glyn Griffiths Herbert*	Unopposed		
Independent hold		Swing		

=== Aberbanc (one seat) ===
Aberbanc 1976
Party	Candidate	Votes	%	±%
Independent	B. Davies	522	57.0	
Plaid Cymru	J. Davies	393	43.0	
Majority			14.0	
Turnout			71.3	
Independent hold		Swing		

=== Aberporth (one seat) ===
Aberporth 1976
Party	Candidate	Votes	%	±%
Independent	J.L. Davies*	928	77.5	
Plaid Cymru	T.M. George	269	22.5	
Majority			55.1	
Turnout			67.0	
Independent hold		Swing		

=== Aberystwyth Ward One (four seats) ===
Aberystwyth Ward One 1976
Party	Candidate	Votes	%	±%
Labour	Griffith Eric Hughes	1,354		
Independent	B. Davies*	1,280		
Independent Labour	Gareth Ellis*	1,280		
Labour	G. Edwards*	1,061		
Plaid Cymru	T. Edwards	652		
Labour	W.J. Eden	541		
Labour	Owen Henry Jones*	401		
Turnout				
Labour hold		Swing		
Independent hold		Swing		
Independent Labour hold		Swing		
Labour hold		Swing		

=== Aberystwyth Ward Two (two seats) ===
Aberystwyth Ward Two 1976
Party	Candidate	Votes	%	±%
Liberal	Miss K.A. Jones*	626		
Plaid Cymru	Robert Davies	315		
Labour	Peter James Goodman	304		
Plaid Cymru	Norman Fitter	296		
Labour	S. Blowers	234		
Turnout			54.1	
Liberal hold		Swing		
Plaid Cymru gain from Independent		Swing		

=== Aberystwyth Ward Three (two seats) ===
Aberystwyth Ward Three 1976
Party	Candidate	Votes	%	±%
Liberal	M. Jones*	1,074		
Plaid Cymru	Hywel Griffiths Evans	895		
Liberal	D. Davies	654		
Turnout			67.6	
Liberal hold		Swing		
Plaid Cymru gain from Liberal		Swing		

=== Aeron (one seat) ===
Aeron 1976
Party	Candidate	Votes	%	±%
Independent	D. Jones	498	72.8	
Independent	T. Jones	186	27.2	
Majority			45.6	
Turnout			75.8	
Independent hold		Swing		

=== Borth (one seat) ===
Borth 1976
Party	Candidate	Votes	%	±%
Independent	William Thomas Kinsey Raw-Rees*	723	87.7	
Labour	J. Vincent	101	12.3	
Majority			75.5	
Turnout			61.8	
Independent hold		Swing		

=== Bow Street (one seat) ===
Bow Street 1976
Party	Candidate	Votes	%	±%
Independent	J. Rees*	462	69.1	
Plaid Cymru	A. Jones	207	30.9	
Majority			38.1	
Turnout			68.5	
Independent hold		Swing		

=== Cardigan (three seats) ===
Cardigan 1976
Party	Candidate	Votes	%	±%
Liberal	W. Jenkins*	unopposed		
Independent	O.M. Owen*	unopposed		
Independent	I.J.C. Radley	unopposed		
Liberal hold		Swing		
Independent hold		Swing		
Independent hold		Swing		

=== Cwmrheidol and Devils' Bridge (one seat) ===
Cwmrheidol and Devils' Bridge 1976
Party	Candidate	Votes	%	±%
Independent	G. Lewis*	301	66.3	
Liberal	E. Griffiths	153	33.7	
Majority			32.6	
Turnout			76.4	
Liberal hold		Swing		

=== Faenor Upper (one seat) ===
Faenor Upper 1976
Party	Candidate	Votes	%	±%
Independent	M.B. Roberts*	371	57.3	
Plaid Cymru	Millicent Gregory	139	21.5	
Independent	C. Morgan	137	21.2	
Majority			35.9	
Turnout			73.5	
Independent hold		Swing		

=== Felinfach (one seat) ===
Felinfach 1976
Party	Candidate	Votes	%	±%
Independent	W.A. Jones*	Unopposed		
Independent hold		Swing		

=== Lampeter (two seats) ===
Lampeter 1976
Party	Candidate	Votes	%	±%
Independent	J.R. Evans	705		
Independent	J. Roberts	506		
Liberal	Mrs C.P. Barton*	453		
Plaid Cymru	B. Parry	377		
Turnout			93.9	
Independent gain from Liberal		Swing		
Independent gain from Liberal		Swing		

=== Llanarth (one seat) ===
Llanarth 1976
Party	Candidate	Votes	%	±%
Independent	S. Thomas	542	61.3	
Independent	B. Jenkins*	342	38.7	
Majority			22.6	
Turnout			84.8	
Independent hold		Swing		

=== Llanbadarn Fawr (one seat) ===
Llanbadarn Fawr 1976
Party	Candidate	Votes	%	±%
Independent	J.E. Raw-Rees			
Independent	G. Aaron			
Majority				
Turnout				
Independent hold		Swing		

=== Llandygwydd (one seat) ===
Llandygwydd 1973
Party	Candidate	Votes	%	±%
Independent	D. Beynon	196		
Independent	I. James	130		
Independent	C. Richards	105		
Majority				
Turnout				
Independent hold		Swing		

=== Llandysul North (one seat) ===
Llandysul North 1976
Party	Candidate	Votes	%	±%
Independent	Thomas John Jones*	unopposed		
Independent hold		Swing		

=== Llandysul South (one seat) ===
Llandysul South 1976
Party	Candidate	Votes	%	±%
Independent	J. Evans*	unopposed		
Independent hold		Swing		

=== Llanfair and Llanwnen (one seat) ===
Llanfair and Llanwnen 1976
Party	Candidate	Votes	%	±%
Independent	Johnny Williams*	550		
Plaid Cymru	G. Joen-Lewis	318		
Majority			26.7	
Turnout			80.5	
Independent hold		Swing		

=== Llanfarian (one seat) ===
This ward was also known as Llanychaiarn.

Llanfarian 1976
Party	Candidate	Votes	%	±%
Labour	Arthur Morgan*	unopposed		
Labour hold		Swing		

=== Llanfihangel and Llanilar (one seat) ===
Llanfihangel and Llanilar 1976
Party	Candidate	Votes	%	±%
Independent	Ll.D. Jones	unopposed		
Independent hold		Swing		

=== Llangeitho and Caron Isclawdd (one seat) ===
Llangeitho and Caron Isclawdd 1976
Party	Candidate	Votes	%	±%
Liberal	W.G. Bennett*	711	80.1	
Plaid Cymru	I. Williams	177	19.9	
Majority			60.1	
Turnout			73.1	
Independent hold		Swing		

=== Llangoedmor (one seat) ===
Llangoedmor 1976
Party	Candidate	Votes	%	±%
Independent	I.J. Griffiths*	unopposed		
Independent hold		Swing		

=== Llangrannog and Penbryn (one seat) ===
Llangrannog and Penbryn 1976
Party	Candidate	Votes	%	±%
Independent	Y. Brown	454	50.6	
Independent	E.T. Jenner	403	44.9	
Independent	G. Hutton	40	4.5	
Majority			5.7	
Turnout			69.2	
Independent hold		Swing		

=== Llanilar and Llanrhystud (one seat) ===
This ward was also known as Llanddeiniol.

Llanilar and Llanrhystud 1976
Party	Candidate	Votes	%	±%
Liberal	William Richard Edwards	342	57.6	
Independent	D. Davies	252	42.4	
Majority			15.2	
Turnout			74.1	
Liberal hold		Swing		

=== Llanllwchaiarn and Llandysiliogogo (one seat) ===
Llanllwchaiarn and Llandysiliogogo 1976
Party	Candidate	Votes	%	±%
Independent	J.E. Evans	307	38.7	
Independent	T. Jones*	205	25.9	
Independent	T. Davies	138	17.4	
Plaid Cymru	Cynog Davies	120	15.1	
Independent	H. Jones	23	2.9	
Majority			12.9	
Turnout			80.3	
Independent hold		Swing		

=== Llansantffraid and Cilcennin (one seat) ===
Llansantffraid and Cilcennin 1976
Party	Candidate	Votes	%	±%
Independent	L. Lloyd*	unopposed		
Independent hold		Swing		

=== Llanwenog (one seat) ===
Llanwenog 1976
Party	Candidate	Votes	%	±%
Independent	D.A. James*	unopposed		
Independent hold		Swing		

=== Lledrod, Strata Florida and Ysbyty Ystwyth (one seat) ===
Lledrod, Strata Florida and Ysbyty Ystwyth 1976
Party	Candidate	Votes	%	±%
Independent	David Lloyd Evans*	unopposed		
Independent hold		Swing		

=== Nantcwnlle, Llanddewi Brefi and Llangeitho (one seat) ===
Nantcwnlle, Llanddewi Brefi and Llangeitho 1973
Party	Candidate	Votes	%	±%
Liberal	E. Williams*	453	51.5	
Independent	Hannah Marion Jones	426	48.5	
Majority			3.0	
Turnout			83.1	
Liberal hold		Swing		

=== New Quay (one seat) ===
New Quay 1976
Party	Candidate	Votes	%	±%
Independent	I.C. Pursey*	293	56.3	+22.3
Plaid Cymru	J. Evans	124	23.8	
Independent	W. Thomas	103	19.8	
Majority			32.5	
Turnout			83.5	
Independent hold		Swing		

=== Taliesin and Talybont (one seat) ===
Taliesin and Talybont 1976
Party	Candidate	Votes	%	±%
Independent	John Rowland Davies*	unopposed		
Independent hold				

=== Trefeurig and Goginan (one seat) ===
Trefeurig and Goginan 1973
Party	Candidate	Votes	%	±%
Independent	J. Jones*	462	69.1	
Plaid Cymru	A. Griffiths	207	30.9	
Majority			38.2	
Turnout			65.7	
Independent hold		Swing		

=== Troedyraur (one seat) ===
Troedyraur 1976
Party	Candidate	Votes	%	±%
Independent	S Idris Evans	354	54.0	
Independent	H. Jones*	301	46.0	
Majority			8.0	
Turnout			73.3	
Independent hold		Swing		
