= Secretary of State for Wales =

Member of the Cabinet of the United Kingdom

United Kingdom Secretary of State for Wales
- The Royal Badge of Wales as used by the Wales Office

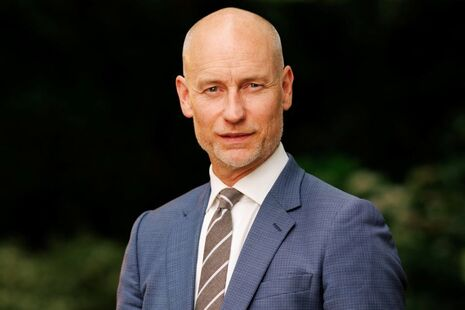
- Incumbent; Stephen Kinnock since 20 July 2026
- Wales Office
- Style: Welsh Secretary (informal); The Right Honourable (within the UK and Commonwealth)
- Type: Minister of the Crown
- Status: Secretary of State
- Member of: Cabinet; Privy Council
- Reports to: The Prime Minister
- Seat: Westminster
- Nominator: The Prime Minister
- Appointer: The Monarch; (on the advice of the Prime Minister)
- Term length: At His Majesty's pleasure
- Formation: 28 October 1951 (as Minister of Welsh Affairs); 18 October 1964: (as Secretary of State for Wales)
- First holder: David Maxwell Fyfe (as Minister of Welsh Affairs)
- Salary: £159,038 per annum (2022) (including £86,584 MP salary)
- Website: www.gov.uk/government/organisations/wales-office

The secretary of state for Wales (Welsh: ysgrifennydd gwladol Cymru), also referred to as the Welsh secretary, is a secretary of state in the Government of the United Kingdom, with responsibility for the Wales Office. The incumbent is a member of the Cabinet of the United Kingdom.

The officeholder works alongside the other Wales Office ministers. The corresponding shadow minister is the shadow secretary of state for Wales. The position is currently held by Stephen Kinnock having been appointed following Andy Burnham's appointment as prime minister in July 2026.

== Creation ==
In the first half of the 20th century, a number of politicians had supported the creation of the post of Secretary of State for Wales as a step towards home rule for Wales. A post of Minister of Welsh Affairs was created in 1951 under the home secretary and was upgraded to minister of state level in 1954.

The Labour Party proposed the creation of a Welsh Office run by a Secretary of State for Wales in their manifesto for the 1959 general election. When they came to power in 1964 this was soon put into effect.

The post of Secretary of State for Wales came into existence on 17 October 1964; the first incumbent was Jim Griffiths, MP for Llanelli. The position entailed responsibility for Wales, and expenditure on certain public services was delegated from Westminster. In April 1965 administration of Welsh affairs, which had previously been divided between a number of government departments, was united in a newly created Welsh Office with the secretary of state for Wales at its head, and the Welsh secretary became responsible for education and training, health, trade and industry, environment, transport and agriculture within Wales.

== History ==
During the 1980s and 1990s, as the number of Conservative MPs for Welsh constituencies dwindled almost to zero, the office fell into disrepute. Nicholas Edwards, MP for Pembrokeshire, held the post for eight years. On his departure, the government ceased to look within Wales for the secretary of state, and the post was increasingly used as a way of getting junior high-fliers into the Cabinet. John Redwood in particular caused embarrassment when he publicly demonstrated his inability to sing "Hen Wlad Fy Nhadau", the Welsh national anthem, at a conference.

The introduction of the National Assembly for Wales and the Welsh Government, after the devolution referendum of 1997, was the beginning of a new era. On 1 July 1999 the majority of the functions of the Welsh Office transferred to the new assembly. The Welsh Office was disbanded, but the post of Secretary of State for Wales was retained, as the head of the newly created Wales Office.

Since 1999 there have been calls for the office of Welsh secretary to be scrapped or merged with the posts of Secretary of State for Scotland and Secretary of State for Northern Ireland, to reflect the lesser powers of the role since devolution. Those calling for a Secretary of State for the Union include UCL political science professor Robert Hazell. Constitutional law professor Rodney Brazier has suggested adding a minister of state into the proposed department with responsibility for English local government.

In June 2024, Plaid Cymru, the Welsh nationalist party, called for the position's abolition describing it as "outdated", that it "entrench[es]" a power imbalance, and its powers should be devolved. The party's representatives accused the shadow Labour holder, Jo Stevens, of having a "contemptuous attitude towards devolution" based on Stevens' comments relating to High Speed 2 and justice and policing. The Conservative incumbent David TC Davies expressed his surprise, stating that the "so-called 'party of Wales' is now wanting to silence Wales' voice [in the cabinet]". In Plaid Cymru's motion on 26 June, calling for the post's abolishment, leader of the Welsh Conservatives, Andrew RT Davies, supported the motion after being confused it was a Tory amendment being voted on.

In July 2026, the Plaid Cymru First Minister of Wales, Rhun ap Iorwerth backed calls to scrap the position.

== Ministers and secretaries of state ==
Colour key
Conservative National Liberal Labour

=== Ministers of Welsh Affairs (1951–1964) ===
Secretary of State	Term of office		Political party	Cabinet	Prime Minister
David Maxwell Fyfe; MP for Liverpool West Derby (also Home Secretary)	28 October 1951	18 October 1954	Conservative	Churchill III	Winston Churchill
Gwilym Lloyd George; MP for Newcastle North (also Home Secretary)	18 October 1954	13 January 1957	National Liberal	Churchill III	Winston Churchill
Gwilym Lloyd George; MP for Newcastle North (also Home Secretary)	18 October 1954	13 January 1957	National Liberal	Eden	Anthony Eden
Henry Brooke; MP for Hampstead (also Min. of Housing & Local Govt.)	13 January 1957	9 October 1961	Conservative	Macmillan I	Harold Macmillan
Henry Brooke; MP for Hampstead (also Min. of Housing & Local Govt.)	13 January 1957	9 October 1961	Conservative	Macmillan II	Harold Macmillan
Charles Hill; MP for Luton (also Min. of Housing & Local Govt.)	9 October 1961	13 July 1962	National Liberal & Conservative	Macmillan II	Harold Macmillan
Keith Joseph; MP for Leeds North East (also Min. of Housing & Local Govt.)	13 July 1962	16 October 1964	Conservative	Macmillan II	Harold Macmillan
Keith Joseph; MP for Leeds North East (also Min. of Housing & Local Govt.)	13 July 1962	16 October 1964	Conservative	Douglas-Home	Alec Douglas-Home
=== Secretaries of State for Wales (1964–present) ===
Secretary of State	Term of office		Political party	Cabinet	Prime Minister
Jim Griffiths; MP for Llanelli	18 October 1964	5 April 1966	Labour	Wilson I	Harold Wilson
Cledwyn Hughes; MP for Anglesey	5 April 1966	5 April 1968	Labour	Wilson II	Harold Wilson
George Thomas; MP for Cardiff West	5 April 1968	20 June 1970	Labour	Wilson II	Harold Wilson
Peter Thomas; MP for Hendon South	20 June 1970	5 March 1974	Conservative	Heath	Edward Heath
John Morris; MP for Aberavon	5 March 1974	4 May 1979	Labour	Wilson III	Harold Wilson
John Morris; MP for Aberavon	5 March 1974	4 May 1979	Labour	Callaghan	James Callaghan
Nicholas Edwards; MP for Pembrokeshire	4 May 1979	13 June 1987	Conservative	Thatcher I	Margaret Thatcher
Nicholas Edwards; MP for Pembrokeshire	4 May 1979	13 June 1987	Conservative	Thatcher II	Margaret Thatcher
Peter Walker; MP for Worcester	13 June 1987	4 May 1990	Conservative	Thatcher III	Margaret Thatcher
David Hunt; MP for Wirral West	4 May 1990	27 May 1993	Conservative	Thatcher III	Margaret Thatcher
David Hunt; MP for Wirral West	4 May 1990	27 May 1993	Conservative	Major I	John Major
David Hunt; MP for Wirral West	4 May 1990	27 May 1993	Conservative	Major II	John Major
John Redwood; MP for Wokingham	27 May 1993	26 June 1995 (Note: Redwood resigned to stand in the 1995 Conservative leadership election. During the election, Hunt acted as Secretary of State.)	Conservative	Major II	John Major
David Hunt; MP for Wirral West (acting)	26 June 1995	5 July 1995	Conservative	Major II	John Major
William Hague; MP for Richmond (Yorks)	5 July 1995	2 May 1997	Conservative	Major II	John Major
Ron Davies; MP for Caerphilly	2 May 1997	27 October 1998 (Note: Resigned following what he described as a "moment of madness" on Clapham Common.)	Labour	Blair I	Tony Blair
Alun Michael; MP for Cardiff South and Penarth	27 October 1998	28 July 1999 (Note: Following implementation of the Government of Wales Act 1998, and the 1999 Assembly election, Michael held office as inaugural First Secretary for Wales from 12 May 1999.)	Labour	Blair I	Tony Blair
Paul Murphy; MP for Torfaen	28 July 1999	24 October 2002	Labour	Blair I	Tony Blair
Paul Murphy; MP for Torfaen	28 July 1999	24 October 2002	Labour	Blair II	Tony Blair
Peter Hain; MP for Neath (also Ldr. of the Commons 2003–05; Northern Ireland Sec. 2005–07; Work & Pensions Sec. 2007–08)	24 October 2002	24 January 2008	Labour	Blair II	Tony Blair
Peter Hain; MP for Neath (also Ldr. of the Commons 2003–05; Northern Ireland Sec. 2005–07; Work & Pensions Sec. 2007–08)	24 October 2002	24 January 2008	Labour	Blair III	Tony Blair
Peter Hain; MP for Neath (also Ldr. of the Commons 2003–05; Northern Ireland Sec. 2005–07; Work & Pensions Sec. 2007–08)	24 October 2002	24 January 2008	Labour	Brown	Gordon Brown
Paul Murphy; MP for Torfaen	24 January 2008	5 June 2009	Labour	Brown	Gordon Brown
Peter Hain; MP for Neath	5 June 2009	11 May 2010	Labour	Brown	Gordon Brown
Cheryl Gillan; MP for Chesham and Amersham	11 May 2010	4 September 2012	Conservative	Cameron–Clegg	David Cameron
David Jones; MP for Clwyd West	4 September 2012	14 July 2014	Conservative	Cameron–Clegg	David Cameron
Stephen Crabb; MP for Preseli Pembrokeshire	15 July 2014	19 March 2016	Conservative	Cameron–Clegg	David Cameron
Stephen Crabb; MP for Preseli Pembrokeshire	15 July 2014	19 March 2016	Conservative	Cameron II	David Cameron
Alun Cairns; MP for Vale of Glamorgan	19 March 2016	6 November 2019	Conservative	Cameron II	David Cameron
Alun Cairns; MP for Vale of Glamorgan	19 March 2016	6 November 2019	Conservative	May I	Theresa May
Alun Cairns; MP for Vale of Glamorgan	19 March 2016	6 November 2019	Conservative	May II	Theresa May
Alun Cairns; MP for Vale of Glamorgan	19 March 2016	6 November 2019	Conservative	Johnson I	Boris Johnson
Simon Hart; MP for Carmarthen West and South Pembrokeshire	16 December 2019	6 July 2022	Conservative	Johnson I	Boris Johnson
Simon Hart; MP for Carmarthen West and South Pembrokeshire	16 December 2019	6 July 2022	Conservative	Johnson II	Boris Johnson
Robert Buckland; MP for South Swindon	7 July 2022	25 October 2022	Conservative	Johnson II	Boris Johnson
Robert Buckland; MP for South Swindon	7 July 2022	25 October 2022	Conservative	Truss	Liz Truss
David TC Davies; MP for Monmouth	25 October 2022	5 July 2024	Conservative	Sunak	Rishi Sunak
Jo Stevens; MP for Cardiff East	5 July 2024	20 July 2026	Labour	Starmer	Keir Starmer
Stephen Kinnock; MP for Aberafan Maesteg	20 July 2026	Incumbent	Labour	Burnham	Andy Burnham

== See also ==
- First Minister for Wales
- Secretary of State for Northern Ireland
- Secretary of State for Scotland
