= Office of the Leader of the House of Lords =

Political role in the UK Government

Office of the Leader of the House of Lords Welsh: Swyddfa Arweinydd Tŷ'r Arglwyddi

Department overview
- Formed: 4 April 1721
- Headquarters: 1 Horse Guards Road, London
- Ministers responsible: Angela Smith, Baroness Smith of Basildon, Leader of the House of Lords; Ray Collins, Baron Collins of Highbury, Deputy Leader of the House of Lords
- Parent Department: Cabinet Office
- Website: gov.uk/leader-lords

The Office of the Leader of the House of Lords (OLHL) is a ministerial department of the Cabinet Office with the duty of providing support to the Leader of the House of Lords, currently Baroness Smith of Basildon. Duties include assisting the leader in providing information, as well as answering questions from members of the House of Lords and the British Government.

The deputy leader also provides support for the office including questioning government ministers and working on legislation debated by the house. The deputy leader is not a cabinet level minister. It also supports the Lords Whips' Office.

== Ministers ==
The ministers are as follows, with cabinet ministers in bold:

Minister	Portrait	Office	Portfolio
**Angela Smith, Baroness Smith of Basildon**		Leader of the House of Lords and Lord Keeper of the Privy Seal	Management and delivery of the Government's legislative programme (through the House of Lords) and facilitating the passage of individual bills; Leading the House (in the Chamber and as a key member of domestic committees to do with procedure, conduct, and the internal governance of the House); Issues connected to the House of Lords and its governance; Speaking for the Government in the Chamber on a range of issues, including repeating in the House of Lords statements made to the Commons by the Prime Minister; Ceremonial and other duties as the Lord Keeper of the Privy Seal.
Ray Collins, Baron Collins of Highbury		Deputy Leader of the House of Lords	The Deputy Leader of the House of Lords supports the House of Lords in its job of questioning government ministers, improving legislation and debating topics of national significance.

== Whips' Office ==
Minister	Rank	Portfolio
Roy Kennedy, Baron Kennedy of Southwark	Chief Whip of the House of Lords; Captain of the Honourable Corps of Gentlemen-at-Arms	Chief Whip has an active role at the despatch box promoting and defending departmental policy which involves: answering questions; responding to debates; taking through primary and secondary legislation
Ruth Anderson, Baroness Anderson of Stoke-on-Trent	Deputy Chief Whip of the House of Lords; Captain of the King's Bodyguard of the Yeomen of the Guard	Deputising for the Chief Whip.
Judith Blake, Baroness Blake of Leeds	Baroness-in-waiting; Government Whip	Ministry of Housing, Communities and Local Government
	Lord-in-waiting; Government Whip	Foreign, Commonwealth and Development Office
Maggie Jones, Baroness Jones of Whitchurch	Baroness-in-waiting; Government Whip	Department for Science, Innovation and Technology and Department for Business and Trade

== See also ==
- Cabinet of the United Kingdom
- Office of the Leader of the House of Commons
- Representative of the Government in the Senate (Canada)
