= Secretary of State for Environment, Food and Rural Affairs =

Member of the Cabinet of the United Kingdom

- Royal Arms of His Majesty's Government

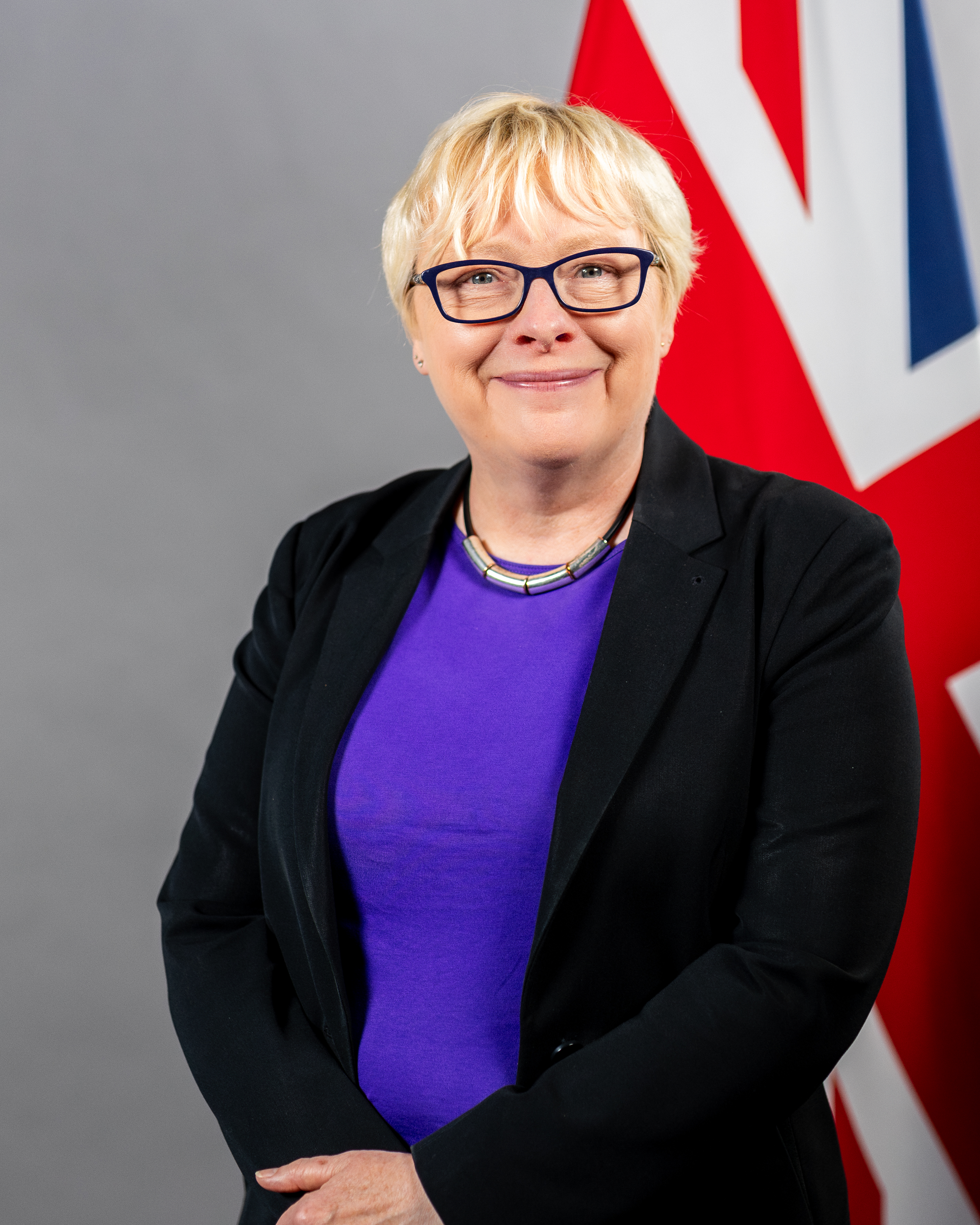
- Incumbent; Angela Eagle since 20 July 2026
- Department for Environment, Food and Rural Affairs (England)
- Style: Environment Secretary (informal); The Right Honourable (within the UK and Commonwealth)
- Type: Minister of the Crown
- Status: Secretary of State
- Member of: Cabinet; Privy Council
- Reports to: The Prime Minister
- Seat: Westminster
- Nominator: The Prime Minister
- Appointer: The Monarch; (on the advice of the Prime Minister)
- Term length: At His Majesty's pleasure
- Formation: 15 October 1970 (as Secretary of State for the Environment); 8 June 2001 (as Secretary of State for Environment, Food and Rural Affairs)
- First holder: Peter Walker (as Secretary of State for the Environment)
- Salary: £159,038 per annum (2022) (including £86,584 MP salary)
- Website: gov.uk/government/ministers/secretary-of-state-for-environment-food-and-rural-affairs

The secretary of state for environment, food and rural affairs, also referred to as the environment secretary, is a secretary of state in the Government of the United Kingdom, with overall responsibility for the Department for Environment, Food and Rural Affairs (Defra). The department's responsibilities are largely limited to England only as they relate to devolved policies. The incumbent is a member of the Cabinet of the United Kingdom.

The office holder works alongside the other Defra ministers. The corresponding shadow minister is the shadow secretary of state for environment, food and rural affairs.

== Responsibilities ==
The secretary of state has two main responsibilities at the Department for Environment, Food and Rural Affairs, to:

- bear overall responsibility for all departmental issues.
- lobby for the United Kingdom in other international negotiations on sustainable development and climate change.

== List of environment secretaries ==
=== Secretaries of state for the environment (1970–1997) ===
Secretary of State	Term of office		Party	Ministry
Peter Walker; MP for Worcester	15 October 1970	5 November 1972	Conservative	Heath
Geoffrey Rippon; MP for Hexham	5 November 1972	4 March 1974	Conservative	Heath
Anthony Crosland; MP for Great Grimsby	5 March 1974	8 April 1976	Labour	Wilson (III & IV)
Peter Shore; MP for Stepney and Poplar	8 April 1976	4 May 1979	Labour	Callaghan
Michael Heseltine; MP for Henley	5 May 1979	6 January 1983	Conservative	Thatcher I
Tom King; MP for Bridgwater	6 January 1983	11 June 1983	Conservative	Thatcher I
Patrick Jenkin; MP for Wanstead and Woodford	11 June 1983	2 September 1985	Conservative	Thatcher II
Kenneth Baker; MP for Mole Valley	2 September 1985	21 May 1986	Conservative	Thatcher II
Nicholas Ridley; MP for Cirencester and Tewkesbury	21 May 1986	24 July 1989	Conservative	Thatcher II
Nicholas Ridley; MP for Cirencester and Tewkesbury	21 May 1986	24 July 1989	Conservative	Thatcher III
Chris Patten; MP for Bath	24 July 1989	28 November 1990	Conservative	Thatcher III
Michael Heseltine; MP for Henley	28 November 1990	11 April 1992	Conservative	Major I
Michael Howard; MP for Folkestone and Hythe	11 April 1992	27 May 1993	Conservative	Major II
John Gummer; MP for Suffolk Coastal	27 May 1993	2 May 1997	Conservative	Major II
=== Secretaries of state for the environment, transport and the regions (1997–2001) ===
John Prescott; MP for Kingston upon Hull East	2 May 1997	8 June 2001	Labour	Blair I
=== Secretaries of state for environment, food and rural affairs (2001–present) ===
Margaret Beckett; MP for Derby South	8 June 2001	5 May 2006	Labour	Blair II
Margaret Beckett; MP for Derby South	8 June 2001	5 May 2006	Labour	Blair III
David Miliband; MP for South Shields	5 May 2006	28 June 2007	Labour	Blair III
Hilary Benn; MP for Leeds Central	28 June 2007	11 May 2010	Labour	Brown
Caroline Spelman; MP for Meriden	12 May 2010	4 September 2012	Conservative	Cameron–Clegg (Con.–L.D.)
Owen Paterson; MP for North Shropshire	4 September 2012	14 July 2014	Conservative	Cameron–Clegg (Con.–L.D.)
Liz Truss; MP for South West Norfolk	15 July 2014	14 July 2016	Conservative	Cameron–Clegg (Con.–L.D.)
Liz Truss; MP for South West Norfolk	15 July 2014	14 July 2016	Conservative	Cameron II
Andrea Leadsom; MP for South Northamptonshire	14 July 2016	11 June 2017	Conservative	May I
Michael Gove; MP for Surrey Heath	11 June 2017	24 July 2019	Conservative	May II
Theresa Villiers; MP for Chipping Barnet	24 July 2019	13 February 2020	Conservative	Johnson I
Theresa Villiers; MP for Chipping Barnet	24 July 2019	13 February 2020	Conservative	Johnson II
George Eustice; MP for Camborne and Redruth	13 February 2020	6 September 2022	Conservative	Johnson II
Ranil Jayawardena; MP for North East Hampshire	6 September 2022	25 October 2022	Conservative	Truss
Thérèse Coffey; MP for Suffolk Coastal	25 October 2022	13 November 2023	Conservative	Sunak
Steve Barclay; MP for North East Cambridgeshire	13 November 2023	5 July 2024	Conservative	Sunak
Steve Reed; MP for Streatham and Croydon North	5 July 2024	5 September 2025	Labour	Starmer
Emma Reynolds; MP for Wycombe	5 September 2025	20 July 2026	Labour	Starmer
Angela Eagle; MP for Wallasey	20 July 2026	Incumbent	Labour	Burnham
