= Starmer ministry =

Government of the United Kingdom from 2024 to 2026

- Cabinet of the United Kingdom
- 2024–2026
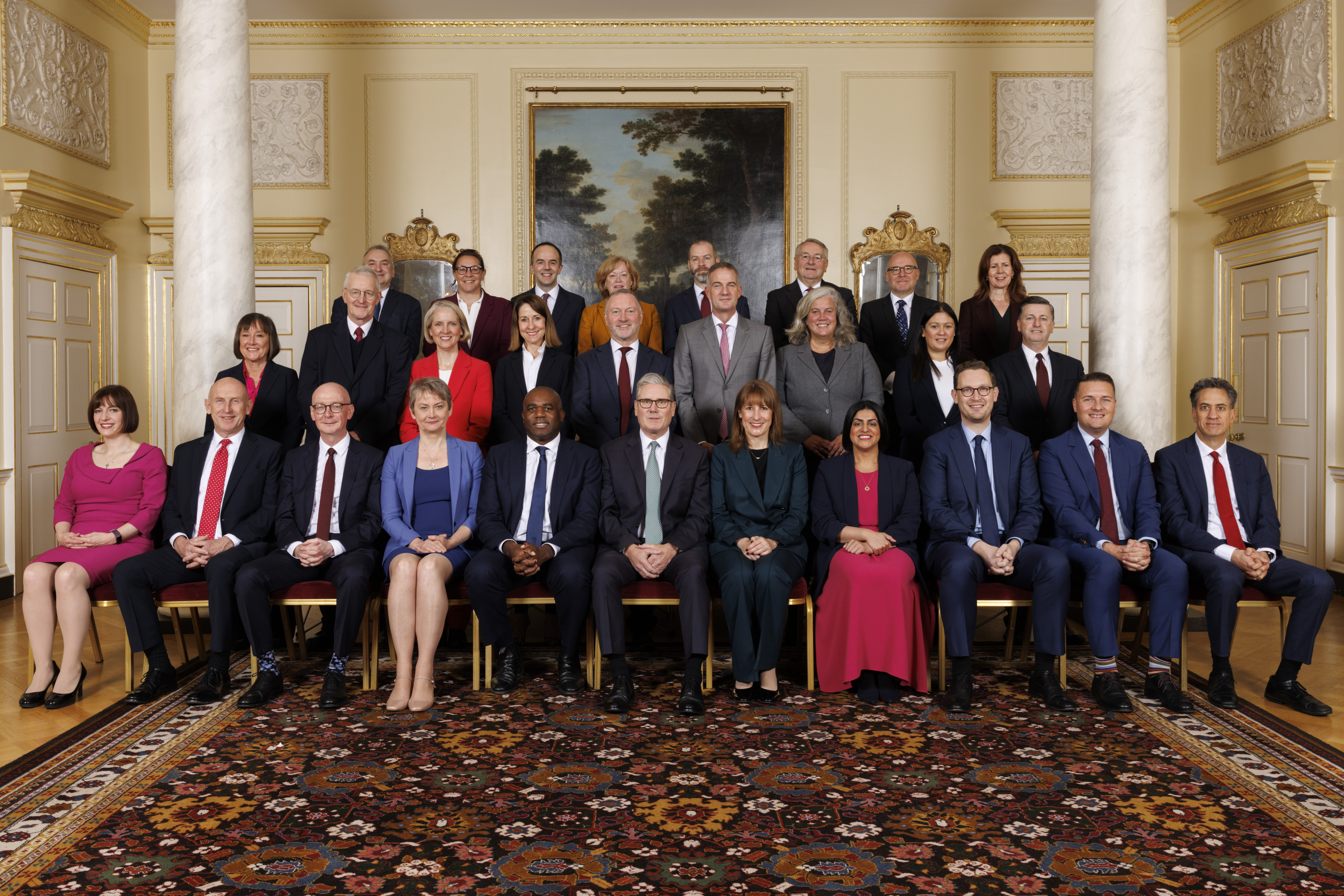
- Starmer's cabinet in October 2025
- Date formed: 5 July 2024
- Date dissolved: 20 July 2026

People and organisations
- Monarch: Charles III
- Prime Minister: Keir Starmer
- Deputy Prime Minister: Angela Rayner (2024–2025); David Lammy (2025–2026)
- No. of ministers: 124 (excluding ministers on maternity leave); 93 MPs, 31 peers; 119 paid, 5 unpaid
- Ministers removed: 20 resigned 1 dismissed 20 (at 2025 reshuffle) left for other reasons
- Member party: Labour Party
- Status in legislature: Majority
- Opposition cabinet: Sunak shadow cabinet; Badenoch shadow cabinet
- Opposition party: Conservative Party
- Opposition leader: Rishi Sunak (2024); Kemi Badenoch (2024–2026)

History
- Outgoing formation: 2026 Labour leadership election
- Election: 2024 general election
- Legislature term: 2024–present
- Budgets: October 2024 budget; March 2025 spring statement; November 2025 budget; March 2026 spring statement
- Predecessor: Sunak ministry
- Successor: Burnham ministry

The Starmer ministry began on 5 July 2024 when Keir Starmer was invited by King Charles III to form a government, following the resignation of Rishi Sunak after the 2024 general election. The Starmer ministry concluded on 20 July 2026 when Andy Burnham became Prime Minister. Starmer's was the shortest ever Labour premiership and the sixth shortest premiership since 1900.

== Background ==
Starmer formed his government throughout 5–7 July, after his party won 411 seats in the 2024 general election, with the new Cabinet meeting for the first time on 6 July, and the new Parliament being called to meet on 9 July. It has been noted for its female political representation, appointing women to a record half of the Cabinet (including Rachel Reeves as the first female Chancellor of the Exchequer in British history) and three of the five top positions in the British government, including Angela Rayner as Deputy Prime Minister and Secretary of State for Housing, Communities and Local Government.

Starmer also appointed experts: scientist Patrick Vallance as Minister of State for Science, rehabilitation campaigner James Timpson as Minister of State for Prisons, Parole and Probation, and international law expert Richard Hermer as Attorney General for England and Wales. The government included a few ministers from the New Labour governments of Tony Blair and Gordon Brown, including Hilary Benn, Yvette Cooper, David Lammy, Ed Miliband and Douglas Alexander in the Cabinet, and Jacqui Smith, David Hanson and Stephen Timms as junior ministers.

== Cabinet ==
=== July 2024 – September 2025 ===
First Starmer Cabinet
Post	Portrait	Incumbent	Seat	Term
Cabinet ministers
Prime Minister, First Lord of the Treasury, Minister for the Civil Service, Minister for the Union		Sir Keir Starmer	Holborn and St Pancras	5 July 2024 – 20 July 2026
Deputy Prime Minister, Secretary of State for Housing, Communities and Local Government		Angela Rayner	Ashton-under-Lyne	5 July 2024 – 5 September 2025
Chancellor of the Exchequer, Second Lord of the Treasury		Rachel Reeves	Leeds West and Pudsey	5 July 2024 – 20 July 2026
Chancellor of the Duchy of Lancaster		Pat McFadden	Wolverhampton South East	5 July 2024 – 5 September 2025
Minister for Intergovernmental Relations		Pat McFadden	Wolverhampton South East	5 September 2024 – 6 September 2025
Secretary of State for Foreign, Commonwealth and Development Affairs		David Lammy	Tottenham	5 July 2024 – 5 September 2025
Secretary of State for the Home Department		Yvette Cooper	Pontefract, Castleford and Knottingley	5 July 2024 – 5 September 2025
Secretary of State for Defence		John Healey	Rawmarsh and Conisbrough	5 July 2024 – 11 June 2026
Lord Chancellor, Secretary of State for Justice		Shabana Mahmood	Birmingham Ladywood	5 July 2024 – 5 September 2025
Secretary of State for Health and Social Care		Wes Streeting	Ilford North	5 July 2024 – 14 May 2026
Secretary of State for Education		Bridget Phillipson	Houghton and Sunderland South	5 July 2024 – 20 July 2026
Minister for Women and Equalities		Bridget Phillipson	Houghton and Sunderland South	8 July 2024 – present
Secretary of State for Energy Security and Net Zero		Ed Miliband	Doncaster North	5 July 2024 – 20 July 2026
Secretary of State for Work and Pensions		Liz Kendall	Leicester West	5 July 2024 – 5 September 2025
Secretary of State for Business and Trade, President of the Board of Trade		Jonathan Reynolds	Stalybridge and Hyde	5 July 2024 – 5 September 2025
Secretary of State for Science, Innovation and Technology		Peter Kyle	Hove and Portslade	5 July 2024 – 5 September 2025
Secretary of State for Transport		Louise Haigh	Sheffield Heeley	5 July 2024 – 28 November 2024
Secretary of State for Transport		Heidi Alexander	Swindon South	29 November 2024 – present
Secretary of State for Environment, Food and Rural Affairs		Steve Reed	Streatham and Croydon North	5 July 2024 – 5 September 2025
Secretary of State for Culture, Media and Sport		Lisa Nandy	Wigan	5 July 2024 – present
Secretary of State for Northern Ireland		Hilary Benn	Leeds South	5 July 2024 – 20 July 2026
Secretary of State for Scotland		Ian Murray	Edinburgh South	5 July 2024 – 5 September 2025
Secretary of State for Wales		Jo Stevens	Cardiff East	5 July 2024 – 20 July 2026
Lord President of the Council, Leader of the House of Commons		Lucy Powell	Manchester Central	5 July 2024 – 5 September 2025
Lord Privy Seal, Leader of the House of Lords		Angela Smith, Baroness Smith of Basildon	Life peer	5 July 2024 – present
Also attending Cabinet
Parliamentary Secretary to the Treasury (Chief Whip)		Sir Alan Campbell	Tynemouth	5 July 2024 – 5 September 2025
Chief Secretary to the Treasury		Darren Jones	Bristol North West	5 July 2024 – 1 September 2025
Attorney General, Advocate General for Northern Ireland		Richard Hermer, Baron Hermer	Life peer	5 July 2024 – 20 July 2026
Minister of State (Development), Minister of State (Minister for Women and Equalities)		Anneliese Dodds	Oxford East	8 July 2024 – 28 February 2025
Minister of State (International Development, Latin America and Caribbean)		Jenny Chapman, Baroness Chapman of Darlington	Life peer	28 February 2025 – 7 September 2025
Minister of State (Minister without Portfolio) *		Ellie Reeves	Lewisham West and East Dulwich	2 December 2024 – 6 September 2025

NB * Also appointed to the non-government role of Chair of the Labour Party.

==== Changes ====
Changes from Starmer's final Shadow Cabinet to Cabinet.

- Thangam Debbonaire (Shadow Culture Secretary) lost her seat and Lisa Nandy was appointed to Cabinet in her place.
- Nandy's previous role (Shadow International Development Cabinet Minister) was a full member of Shadow Cabinet despite the department having merged into the Foreign Office under the previous government (not reformed by Starmer). Anneliese Dodds was appointed to attend Cabinet as Minister of State (Development).
- Dodds was also appointed Minister of State (Minister for Women and Equalities), while Bridget Phillipson was appointed to the more senior role of Minister for Women and Equalities. Dodds had served in Shadow Cabinet as Chair of the Labour Party and Shadow Women and Equalities Secretary.
- Ellie Reeves' previous role (Deputy National Campaign Coordinator) has no government equivalent. She was appointed to succeed Dodds as Chair of the Labour Party (a non-ministerial role). She was also appointed Minister of State in the Cabinet Office (Minister without Portfolio), but did not initially attend Cabinet.
- Jonathan Ashworth (Shadow Paymaster General) lost his seat. Nick Thomas-Symonds (Shadow Minister without Portfolio) was appointed Paymaster General and Minister for the Cabinet Office (Minister for the Constitution and European Union Relations), but did not attend Cabinet.
- Emily Thornberry (Shadow Attorney General) was not appointed to Cabinet nor any junior ministerial role and returned to the backbenches. Richard Hermer was appointed Attorney General from outside parliament and was given a life peerage to serve.
- Hermer, Sir Alan Campbell (Government Chief Whip in the House of Commons) and Darren Jones (Chief Secretary to the Treasury) were appointed to attend Cabinet. These portfolios had been full members of the Shadow Cabinet.
- Lord Kennedy of Southwark (Government Chief Whip in the House of Lords) had been a member of the Shadow Cabinet as Chief Whip of the Labour Party in the House of Lords, but he was not appointed to Cabinet while remaining in the same role.

Subsequent changes.

- Pat McFadden was appointed to the additional role of Minister for Intergovernmental Relations on 5 September 2024.
- Louise Haigh resigned as Transport Secretary on 28 November 2024, and was replaced by Heidi Alexander the following day.
- Ellie Reeves was promoted to attend Cabinet in her existing role as Minister of State in the Cabinet Office (Minister without Portfolio) on 2 December 2024.
- Anneliese Dodds resigned as Minister of State (Development) and Minister of State (Minister for Women and Equalities) on 28 February 2025. Dodds was replaced in her Cabinet-attending Development role by Jenny Chapman, Baroness Chapman of Darlington, and in her Women and Equalities role by Jacqui Smith, Baroness Smith of Malvern.

=== September 2025 – July 2026 ===
Second Starmer Cabinet
Post	Portrait	Incumbent	Seat	Term
Cabinet ministers
Prime Minister, First Lord of the Treasury, Minister for the Civil Service, Minister for the Union		Sir Keir Starmer	Holborn and St Pancras	5 July 2024 – 20 July 2026
Deputy Prime Minister, Lord Chancellor and Secretary of State for Justice		David Lammy	Tottenham	5 September 2025 – 20 July 2026
Chancellor of the Exchequer		Rachel Reeves	Leeds West and Pudsey	5 July 2024 – 20 July 2026
Secretary of State for Foreign, Commonwealth and Development Affairs		Yvette Cooper	Pontefract, Castleford and Knottingley	5 September 2025 – 20 July 2026
Secretary of State for the Home Department		Shabana Mahmood	Birmingham Ladywood	5 September 2025 – present
Secretary of State for Work and Pensions		Pat McFadden	Wolverhampton South East	5 September 2025 – present
Chief Secretary to the Prime Minister		Darren Jones	Bristol North West	1 September 2025 – 20 July 2026
Minister for Intergovernmental Relations		Darren Jones	Bristol North West	6 September 2025 – 20 July 2026
Chancellor of the Duchy of Lancaster		Darren Jones	Bristol North West	5 September 2025 – 20 July 2026
Secretary of State for Defence		John Healey	Rawmarsh and Conisbrough	5 July 2024 – 11 June 2026
Secretary of State for Defence		Dan Jarvis	Barnsley North	11 June 2026 – 20 July 2026
Secretary of State for Health and Social Care		Wes Streeting	Ilford North	5 July 2024 – 14 May 2026
Secretary of State for Health and Social Care		James Murray	Ealing North	14 May 2026 – 20 July 2026
Secretary of State for Education		Bridget Phillipson	Houghton and Sunderland South	5 July 2024 – 20 July 2026
Minister for Women and Equalities		Bridget Phillipson	Houghton and Sunderland South	8 July 2024 – present
Secretary of State for Energy Security and Net Zero		Ed Miliband	Doncaster North	5 July 2024 – 20 July 2026
Secretary of State for Housing, Communities and Local Government		Steve Reed	Streatham and Croydon North	5 September 2025 – 20 July 2026
Secretary of State for Business and Trade, President of the Board of Trade		Peter Kyle	Hove and Portslade	5 September 2025 – 20 July 2026
Secretary of State for Science, Innovation and Technology		Liz Kendall	Leicester West	5 September 2025 – 20 July 2026
Secretary of State for Transport		Heidi Alexander	Swindon South	29 November 2024 – present
Secretary of State for Environment, Food and Rural Affairs		Emma Reynolds	Wycombe	5 September 2025 – 20 July 2026
Secretary of State for Culture, Media and Sport		Lisa Nandy	Wigan	5 July 2024 – present
Secretary of State for Northern Ireland		Hilary Benn	Leeds South	5 July 2024 – 20 July 2026
Secretary of State for Scotland		Douglas Alexander	Lothian East	5 September 2025 – present
Secretary of State for Wales		Jo Stevens	Cardiff East	5 July 2024 – 20 July 2026
Parliamentary Secretary to the Treasury (Chief Whip)		Jonathan Reynolds	Stalybridge and Hyde	5 September 2025 – 20 July 2026
Lord Privy Seal, Leader of the House of Lords		Angela Smith, Baroness Smith of Basildon	Life peer	5 July 2024 – present
Lord President of the Council, Leader of the House of Commons		Sir Alan Campbell	Tynemouth	12 June 2026 – present
Also attending Cabinet
Lord President of the Council, Leader of the House of Commons		Sir Alan Campbell	Tynemouth	5 September 2025 – 12 June 2026
Chief Secretary to the Treasury		James Murray	Ealing North	1 September 2025 – 14 May 2026
Chief Secretary to the Treasury		Lucy Rigby	Northampton North	14 May 2026 – 20 July 2026
Attorney General		Richard Hermer, Baron Hermer	Life peer	5 July 2024 – 20 July 2026
Minister of State (International Development and Africa)		Jenny Chapman, Baroness Chapman of Darlington	Life peer	7 September 2025 – 21 July 2026
Paymaster General, Minister for the Cabinet Office (Minister for the Constitution and European Union Relations)		Nick Thomas-Symonds	Torfaen	2 December 2025 – 20 July 2026
Minister of State (Minister without Portfolio) *		Anna Turley	Redcar	6 September 2025 – 21 July 2026

NB * Also appointed to the non-government role of Chair of the Labour Party.

==== Changes ====
- Darren Jones was appointed to the new role of Chief Secretary to the Prime Minister on 1 September 2025 and subsequently took over two roles from Pat McFadden, Chancellor of the Duchy of Lancaster on 5 September 2025 and Minister for Intergovernmental Relations on 6 September 2025.
- James Murray replaced Darren Jones as Chief Secretary to the Treasury.
- Angela Rayner resigned.
- David Lammy moved to be Lord Chancellor and Secretary of State for Justice, replacing Shabana Mahmood. He was also appointed Deputy Prime Minister, replacing Angela Rayner.
- Yvette Cooper moved to be Secretary of State for Foreign, Commonwealth and Development Affairs, replacing David Lammy.
- Shabana Mahmood moved to be Secretary of State for the Home Department, replacing Yvette Cooper.
- Steve Reed moved to be Secretary of State for Housing, Communities and Local Government, replacing Angela Rayner.
- Emma Reynolds was appointed Secretary of State for Environment, Food and Rural Affairs, replacing Steve Reed.
- Sir Alan Campbell was appointed Lord President of the Council and Leader of the House of Commons, replacing Lucy Powell who left the government.
- Jonathan Reynolds was appointed Parliamentary Secretary to the Treasury and Government Chief Whip in the House of Commons, replacing Sir Alan Campbell.
- Peter Kyle moved to be Secretary of State for Business and Trade and President of the Board of Trade, replacing Jonathan Reynolds.
- Liz Kendall moved to be Secretary of State for Science, Innovation and Technology, replacing Peter Kyle.
- Pat McFadden moved to be Secretary of State for Work and Pensions, replacing Liz Kendall.
- Douglas Alexander was appointed Secretary of State for Scotland, replacing Ian Murray who moved to be Minister of State in the Department for Culture, Media and Sport and the Department for Science, Innovation and Technology (Murray will no longer attend Cabinet).
- Anna Turley was appointed Minister of State in the Cabinet Office (Minister without Portfolio), replacing Ellie Reeves who moved to be Solicitor General (Reeves will no longer attend Cabinet).

Non-ministerial changes (alongside reshuffle):

- Anna Turley also replaced Ellie Reeves as Chair of the Labour Party.
- Minouche Shafik, Baroness Shafik joined as an economic adviser.
- James Lyons departed as strategic communications director.
- Nin Pandit departed as Principal Private Secretary to the Prime Minister of the United Kingdom.

Subsequent changes.

- Nick Thomas-Symonds was promoted to attend Cabinet in his existing role as Paymaster General and Minister for the Cabinet Office (Minister for the Constitution and European Union Relations) on 2 December 2025.
- Wes Streeting resigned as Secretary of State for Health and Social Care on 14 May 2026, saying he had lost confidence in Starmer's leadership following the 2026 United Kingdom local elections. James Murray replaced Streeting, with Lucy Rigby replacing Murray as Chief Secretary to the Treasury.
- John Healey resigned as Secretary of State for Defence on 11 June 2026, saying that the defence investment plan fell short of what was required for defence and the country. Dan Jarvis replaced him.
- Sir Alan Campbell was promoted from attending Cabinet to full member of the Cabinet in his existing role as Lord President of the Council and Leader of the House of Commons on 12 June 2026.

== List of ministers ==
Member of the House of Commons	Member of the House of Lords
Cabinet ministers are listed in **bold**
Ministers that attend Cabinet are listed in **bold italics**

=== Prime Minister and Cabinet Office ===
Cabinet Office including Prime Minister's Office
Post	Incumbent	Term
Prime Minister, First Lord of the Treasury, Minister for the Civil Service, Minister for the Union	**Sir Keir Starmer**	5 July 2024 – 20 July 2026
Chancellor of the Duchy of Lancaster	**Pat McFadden**	5 July 2024 – 5 September 2025
Minister for Intergovernmental Relations	**Pat McFadden**	5 September 2024 – 6 September 2025
Chief Secretary to the Prime Minister	**Darren Jones**	1 September 2025 – 20 July 2026
Minister for Intergovernmental Relations	**Darren Jones**	6 September 2025 – 20 July 2026
Chancellor of the Duchy of Lancaster	**Darren Jones**	5 September 2025 – 20 July 2026
Minister of State (Minister without Portfolio)	**Ellie Reeves** (attending Cabinet from December 2024) (unpaid)	6 July 2024 – 6 September 2025
Minister of State (Minister without Portfolio)	**Anna Turley** (unpaid)	6 September 2025 – 21 July 2026
Paymaster General, Minister for the Cabinet Office (Minister for the Constitution and European Union Relations)	**Nick Thomas-Symonds** (attending Cabinet from December 2025)	8 July 2024 – 20 July 2026
Minister of State	Douglas Alexander (also Minister for Trade Policy and Economic Security)	10 February 2025 – 5 September 2025
Minister of State (Minister for Security) (jointly with Home Office from September 2025)	Dan Jarvis	6 September 2025 – 11 June 2026
Minister of State (Minister for Security) (jointly with Home Office from September 2025)	Angela Eagle	12 June 2026 – 20 July 2026
Parliamentary Secretary	Georgia Gould	9 July 2024 – 6 September 2025
Parliamentary Secretary	Abena Oppong-Asare	9 July 2024 – 6 September 2025
Parliamentary Secretary	Chris Ward	6 September 2025 – 22 July 2026
Parliamentary Secretary	Satvir Kaur (on maternity leave until February 2026)	7 September 2025 – 22 July 2026
Parliamentary Secretary	Josh Simons (covering Satvir Kaur during her maternity leave) (also Parliamentary Under-Secretary of State in the Department for Science, Innovation and Technology from January 2026)	7 September 2025 – 28 February 2026
Parliamentary Secretary	James Frith (also Parliamentary Under-Secretary of State in the Department for Science, Innovation and Technology)	3 March 2026 – 22 July 2026
Parliamentary Secretary	Ruth Anderson, Baroness Anderson of Stoke-on-Trent (also Baroness in Waiting until 12 June 2026)	3 March 2026 – 22 July 2026

=== Departments of state ===
Department for Business and Trade and UK Export Finance
Post	Incumbent	Term
Secretary of State for Business and Trade, President of the Board of Trade	**Jonathan Reynolds**	5 July 2024 – 5 September 2025
Secretary of State for Business and Trade, President of the Board of Trade	**Peter Kyle**	5 September 2025 – 20 July 2026
Minister of State (Minister for Trade Policy and Economic Security)	Douglas Alexander (also Minister of State in the Cabinet Office from February 2025)	6 July 2024 – 5 September 2025
Minister of State (Minister for Trade)	Sir Chris Bryant	6 September 2025 – 20 July 2026
Minister of State (Minister for Investment) (jointly with HM Treasury)	Poppy Gustafsson, Baroness Gustafsson (unpaid)	10 October 2024 – 6 September 2025
Minister of State (Minister for Investment) (jointly with HM Treasury)	Jason Stockwood, Baron Stockwood (unpaid)	6 September 2025 – 21 July 2026
Minister of State (Minister for Industry) (jointly with Department for Energy Security and Net Zero)	Sarah Jones	8 July 2024 – 6 September 2025
Parliamentary Under-Secretary of State (Minister for Industry) (jointly with Department for Energy Security and Net Zero)	Chris McDonald	11 September 2025 – 21 July 2026
Parliamentary Under-Secretary of State (Minister for Employment Rights, Competition and Markets)	Justin Madders	9 July 2024 – 7 September 2025
Parliamentary Under-Secretary of State (Minister for Employment Rights and Consumer Protection)	Kate Dearden	7 September 2025 – 21 July 2026
Parliamentary Under-Secretary of State (Minister for Services, Small Business and Exports)	Gareth Thomas	9 July 2024 – 7 September 2025
Parliamentary Under-Secretary of State (Minister for Small Business and Economic Transformation)	Blair McDougall	7 September 2025 – 22 July 2026
Parliamentary Under-Secretary of State (Minister for Legislation)	Maggie Jones, Baroness Jones of Whitchurch (also Minister for the Future Digital Economy and Online Safety, also Baroness in Waiting) (paid as a whip)	9 July 2024 – 7 September 2025
Parliamentary Under-Secretary of State (Minister for Digital Economy) (jointly with Department for Science, Innovation and Technology)	Liz Lloyd, Baroness Lloyd of Effra (also Baroness in Waiting) (paid as a whip)	11 September 2025 – 12 June 2026
Parliamentary Under-Secretary of State	Sonny Leong, Baron Leong	12 June 2026 – 22 July 2026

Department for Culture, Media and Sport
Post	Incumbent	Term
Secretary of State for Culture, Media and Sport	**Lisa Nandy**	5 July 2024 – present
Minister of State (Minister for Creative Industries, Arts and Tourism)	Sir Chris Bryant (also Minister for Data Protection and Telecoms)	8 July 2024 – 6 September 2025
Minister of State (Minister for Creative Industries, Media and Arts)	Ian Murray (also Minister for Digital Government and Data)	6 September 2025 – 21 July 2026
Parliamentary Under-Secretary of State (Minister for Sport, Media, Civil Society and Youth)	Stephanie Peacock	9 July 2024 – September 2025
Parliamentary Under-Secretary of State (Minister for Sport, Tourism, Civil Society and Youth)	Stephanie Peacock	September 2025 – 22 July 2026
Parliamentary Under-Secretary of State (Minister for Gambling and Heritage, and Lords Minister)	Fiona Twycross, Baroness Twycross (also Baroness in Waiting until 12 June 2026)	23 July 2024 – September 2025
Parliamentary Under-Secretary of State (Minister for Museums, Heritage and Gambling, and Lords Minister)	Fiona Twycross, Baroness Twycross (also Baroness in Waiting until 12 June 2026)	September 2025 – 22 July 2026

Ministry of Defence
Post	Incumbent	Term
Secretary of State for Defence	**John Healey**	5 July 2024 – 11 June 2026
Secretary of State for Defence	**Dan Jarvis**	11 June 2026 – 21 July 2026
Minister of State (Minister for the House of Lords)	Vernon Coaker, Baron Coaker	8 July 2024 – present
Minister of State (Minister for Defence Procurement and Industry)	Maria Eagle	8 July 2024 – 6 September 2025
Minister of State (Minister for Defence Readiness and Industry)	Luke Pollard	6 September 2025 – present
Parliamentary Under-Secretary of State (Minister for the Armed Forces)	Luke Pollard	9 July 2024 – 6 September 2025
Parliamentary Under-Secretary of State (Minister for the Armed Forces)	Alistair Carns	6 September 2025 – 11 June 2026
Parliamentary Under-Secretary of State (Minister for the Armed Forces)	Louise Sandher-Jones	12 June 2026 – present
Parliamentary Under-Secretary of State (Minister for Veterans and People)	Alistair Carns	9 July 2024 – 6 September 2025
Parliamentary Under-Secretary of State (Minister for Veterans and People)	Louise Sandher-Jones	6 September 2025 – 12 June 2026
Parliamentary Under-Secretary of State (Minister for Veterans and People)	Calvin Bailey	12 June 2026 – present

Department for Education including Office for Equality and Opportunity
Post	Incumbent	Term
Secretary of State for Education	**Bridget Phillipson**	5 July 2024 – 20 July 2026
Minister for Women and Equalities	**Bridget Phillipson**	8 July 2024 – present
Minister of State (Minister for Women and Equalities)	**Anneliese Dodds** (also Minister of State (Development))	8 July 2024 – 28 February 2025
Minister of State (Minister for Women and Equalities)	Jacqui Smith, Baroness Smith of Malvern	4 March 2025 – 21 July 2026
Minister of State (Minister for Skills) (jointly with Department for Work and Pensions from September 2025)	Jacqui Smith, Baroness Smith of Malvern	6 July 2024 – present
Minister of State (Minister for School Standards)	Catherine McKinnell	8 July 2024 – 6 September 2025
Minister of State (Minister for School Standards)	Georgia Gould	6 September 2025 – present
Minister of State (Minister for Social Security and Disability) (jointly with Department for Work and Pensions)	Sir Stephen Timms	8 July 2024 – present
Parliamentary Under-Secretary of State (Minister for Equalities)	Dame Nia Griffith (also Parliamentary Under-Secretary of State in the Wales Office)	8 October 2024 – 7 September 2025
Parliamentary Under-Secretary of State (Minister for Equalities)	Seema Malhotra (also Minister for Migration and Citizenship until September 2025, also Parliamentary Under-Secretary of State (Indo-Pacific) from September 2025)	8 October 2024 – 22 July 2026
Parliamentary Under-Secretary of State (Minister for Equalities)	Olivia Bailey	7 September 2025 – 22 July 2026
Parliamentary Under-Secretary of State (Minister for Early Education)	Olivia Bailey	7 September 2025 – 22 July 2026
Parliamentary Under-Secretary of State (Minister for Early Education)	Stephen Morgan	9 July 2024 – 7 September 2025
Parliamentary Under-Secretary of State (Minister for Children and Families)	Janet Daby	9 July 2024 – 7 September 2025
Parliamentary Under-Secretary of State (Minister for Children and Families)	Josh MacAlister	7 September 2025 – present

Department for Energy Security and Net Zero
Post	Incumbent	Term
Secretary of State for Energy Security and Net Zero	**Ed Miliband**	5 July 2024 – 20 July 2026
Minister of State (Minister for Energy Security and Net Zero)	Philip Hunt, Baron Hunt of Kings Heath (unpaid)	9 July 2024 – 22 May 2025
Minister of State (Minister for Energy Security and Net Zero)	Margaret Curran, Baroness Curran (unpaid)	22 May 2025 – 6 June 2025
Minister of State (Minister for Energy Security and Net Zero)	Alan Whitehead, Baron Whitehead	11 November 2025 – 21 July 2026
Minister of State (Minister for Science, Innovation, Research and Nuclear) (jointly with Department for Science, Innovation and Technology)	Patrick Vallance, Baron Vallance of Balham	6 September 2025 – 20 July 2026
Minister of State (Minister for Industry) (jointly with Department for Business and Trade)	Sarah Jones	8 July 2024 – 6 September 2025
Minister of State (Minister for Energy)	Michael Shanks	6 September 2025 – present
Parliamentary Under-Secretary of State (Minister for Energy)	Michael Shanks	9 July 2024 – 6 September 2025
Parliamentary Under-Secretary of State (Minister for Industry) (jointly with Department for Business and Trade)	Chris McDonald	11 September 2025 – 21 July 2026
Parliamentary Under-Secretary of State (Minister for Energy Consumers)	Miatta Fahnbulleh	9 July 2024 – 6 September 2025
Parliamentary Under-Secretary of State (Minister for Energy Consumers)	Martin McCluskey	7 September 2025 – 22 July 2026
Parliamentary Under-Secretary of State (Minister for Climate)	Kerry McCarthy	9 July 2024 – 7 September 2025
Parliamentary Under-Secretary of State (Minister for Climate)	Katie White	7 September 2025 – 21 July 2026

Department for Environment, Food and Rural Affairs
Post	Incumbent	Term
Secretary of State for Environment, Food and Rural Affairs	**Steve Reed**	5 July 2024 – 5 September 2025
Secretary of State for Environment, Food and Rural Affairs	**Emma Reynolds**	5 September 2025 – 20 July 2026
Minister of State (Minister for Food Security and Rural Affairs)	Daniel Zeichner	8 July 2024 – 6 September 2025
Minister of State (Minister for Food Security and Rural Affairs)	Dame Angela Eagle	6 September 2025 – 12 June 2026
Minister of State (Minister for Food Security and Rural Affairs)	Stephen Morgan	12 June 2026 – 22 July 2026
Parliamentary Under-Secretary of State (Minister for Water and Flooding)	Emma Hardy	9 July 2024 – 21 July 2026
Parliamentary Under-Secretary of State (Minister for Nature)	Mary Creagh	18 July 2024 – 22 July 2026
Parliamentary Under-Secretary of State (Minister for Biosecurity, Borders and Animals)	Sue Hayman, Baroness Hayman of Ullock	9 July 2024 – present

Foreign, Commonwealth and Development Office
Post	Incumbent	Term
Secretary of State for Foreign, Commonwealth and Development Affairs	**David Lammy**	5 July 2024 – 5 September 2025
Secretary of State for Foreign, Commonwealth and Development Affairs	**Yvette Cooper**	5 September 2025 – 20 July 2026
Minister of State (Development)	**Anneliese Dodds** (also Minister of State (Minister for Women and Equalities))	8 July 2024 – 28 February 2025
Minister of State (International Development, Latin America and Caribbean)	**Jenny Chapman, Baroness Chapman of Darlington**	28 February 2025 – 7 September 2025
Minister of State (International Development and Africa)	**Jenny Chapman, Baroness Chapman of Darlington**	7 September 2025 – 21 July 2026
Minister of State (Europe, North America and Overseas Territories)	Stephen Doughty	8 July 2024 – 21 July 2026
Parliamentary Under-Secretary of State (Latin America and Caribbean)	Jenny Chapman, Baroness Chapman of Darlington	18 July 2024 – 28 February 2025
Parliamentary Under-Secretary of State (Multilateral, Human Rights, Latin America and the Caribbean)	Chris Elmore	7 September 2025 – 22 July 2026
Parliamentary Under-Secretary of State (Africa)	Ray Collins, Baron Collins of Highbury (also Deputy Leader of the House of Lords, also Lord in Waiting) (paid as a whip)	9 July 2024 – 7 September 2025
Parliamentary Under-Secretary of State (Indo-Pacific)	Catherine West	9 July 2024 – 6 September 2025
Parliamentary Under-Secretary of State (Indo-Pacific)	Seema Malhotra (also Minister for Equalities)	6 September 2025 – 22 July 2026
Parliamentary Under-Secretary of State (Middle East, North Africa, Afghanistan and Pakistan)	Hamish Falconer	18 July 2024 – 20 July 2026

Department of Health and Social Care
Post	Incumbent	Term
Secretary of State for Health and Social Care	**Wes Streeting**	5 July 2024 – 14 May 2026
Secretary of State for Health and Social Care	**James Murray**	14 May 2026 – 21 July 2026
Minister of State for Care	Stephen Kinnock	8 July 2024 – 20 July 2026
Minister of State for Health (Secondary Care)	Karin Smyth	8 July 2024 – present
Parliamentary Under-Secretary of State for Public Health and Prevention	Andrew Gwynne	9 July 2024 – 8 February 2025
Parliamentary Under-Secretary of State for Public Health and Prevention	Ashley Dalton	10 February 2025 – 2 March 2026
Parliamentary Under-Secretary of State for Public Health and Prevention	Sharon Hodgson	3 March 2026 – 22 July 2026
Parliamentary Under-Secretary of State for Patient Safety, Women's Health and Mental Health	Gillian Merron, Baroness Merron	9 July 2024 – 6 September 2025
Parliamentary Under-Secretary of State for Women's Health and Mental Health	Gillian Merron, Baroness Merron	6 September 2025 – 22 July 2026
Parliamentary Under-Secretary of State for Health Innovation and Safety	Zubir Ahmed	6 September 2025 – 12 May 2026
Parliamentary Under-Secretary of State for Health Innovation and Safety	Preet Kaur Gill	12 May 2026 – 22 July 2026

Home Office
Post	Incumbent	Term
Secretary of State for the Home Department	**Yvette Cooper**	5 July 2024 – 5 September 2025
Secretary of State for the Home Department	**Shabana Mahmood**	5 September 2025 – present
Minister of State (Minister for Security) (jointly with Cabinet Office from September 2025)	Dan Jarvis	6 July 2024 – 11 June 2026
Minister of State (Minister for Security) (jointly with Cabinet Office from September 2025)	Dame Angela Eagle	12 June 2026 – 20 July 2026
Minister of State (Minister for Border Security and Asylum)	Dame Angela Eagle	8 July 2024 – 6 September 2025
Minister of State (Minister for Border Security and Asylum)	Alex Norris	6 September 2025 – 20 July 2026
Minister of State (Minister for Policing, Fire and Crime Prevention)	Dame Diana Johnson	8 July 2024 – 1 April 2025
Minister of State (Minister for Policing and Crime Prevention)	Dame Diana Johnson	1 April 2025 – 6 September 2025
Minister of State (Minister for Policing and Crime)	Sarah Jones	6 September 2025 – present
Minister of State (Lords Minister)	David Hanson, Baron Hanson of Flint	9 July 2024 – present
Parliamentary Under-Secretary of State (Minister for Safeguarding and Violence Against Women and Girls)	Jess Phillips	9 July 2024 – 12 May 2026
Parliamentary Under-Secretary of State (Minister for Safeguarding and Violence Against Women and Girls)	Natalie Fleet	12 May 2026 – 22 July 2026
Parliamentary Under-Secretary of State (Minister for Migration and Citizenship)	Seema Malhotra (also Minister for Equalities from October 2024)	9 July 2024 – 6 September 2025
Parliamentary Under-Secretary of State (Minister for Migration and Citizenship)	Mike Tapp	6 September 2025 – 22 July 2026

Ministry of Housing, Communities and Local Government
Post	Incumbent	Term
Deputy Prime Minister	**Angela Rayner**	5 July 2024 – 5 September 2025
Secretary of State for Housing, Communities and Local Government	**Angela Rayner**	5 July 2024 – 5 September 2025
Secretary of State for Housing, Communities and Local Government	**Steve Reed**	5 September 2025 – 20 July 2026
Minister of State (Minister for Local Government and English Devolution)	Jim McMahon	6 July 2024 – 6 September 2025
Minister of State (Minister for Local Government and Homelessness)	Alison McGovern	6 September 2025 – 22 July 2026
Minister of State (Minister for Housing and Planning)	Matthew Pennycook	6 July 2024 – present
Parliamentary Under-Secretary of State (Minister for Democracy and Local Growth)	Alex Norris	9 July 2024 – 19 October 2024
Parliamentary Under-Secretary of State (Minister for Local Growth and Building Safety)	Alex Norris	19 October 2024 – 1 April 2025
Parliamentary Under-Secretary of State (Minister for Local Growth, Fire and Building Safety)	Alex Norris	1 April 2025 – 6 September 2025
Parliamentary Under-Secretary of State (Minister for Building Safety and Homelessness)	Rushanara Ali	9 July 2024 – 19 October 2024
Parliamentary Under-Secretary of State (Minister for Homelessness and Democracy)	Rushanara Ali	19 October 2024 – 7 August 2025
Parliamentary Under-Secretary of State (Minister for Building Safety, Fire and Democracy)	Samantha Dixon	6 September 2025 – 22 July 2026
Parliamentary Under-Secretary of State (Lords Minister for Housing and Local Government)	Sharon Taylor, Baroness Taylor of Stevenage (also Baroness in Waiting until 12 June 2026)	9 July 2024 – present
Parliamentary Under-Secretary of State (Lords Minister for Faith, Communities and Resettlement)	Wajid Khan, Baron Khan of Burnley	9 July 2024 – 6 September 2025
Parliamentary Under-Secretary of State (Minister for Devolution, Faith and Communities)	Miatta Fahnbulleh	6 September 2025 – 12 May 2026
Parliamentary Under-Secretary of State (Minister for Devolution, Faith and Communities)	Nesil Caliskan	12 May 2026 – 12 June 2026
Parliamentary Under-Secretary of State (Minister for Devolution, Local Growth and Communities)	Nesil Caliskan	12 June 2026 – 22 July 2026
Parliamentary Under-Secretary of State (Minister for Faith)	Gerard Lemos, Baron Lemos	12 June 2026 – 22 July 2026

Ministry of Justice
Post	Incumbent	Term
Lord Chancellor, Secretary of State for Justice	**Shabana Mahmood**	5 July 2024 – 5 September 2025
Lord Chancellor, Secretary of State for Justice	**David Lammy**	5 September 2025 – 20 July 2026
Deputy Prime Minister	**David Lammy**	5 September 2025 – 20 July 2026
Minister of State for Prisons, Probation and Reducing Reoffending	James Timpson, Baron Timpson (unpaid)	5 July 2024 – 20 July 2026
Minister of State for Courts and Legal Services	Heidi Alexander	8 July 2024 – 29 November 2024
Minister of State for Courts and Legal Services	Sarah Sackman	2 December 2024 – present
Parliamentary Under-Secretary of State and Lords Minister	Frederick Ponsonby, Baron Ponsonby of Shulbrede (also Lord in Waiting) (paid as a whip)	9 July 2024 – 6 September 2025
Parliamentary Under-Secretary of State and Lords Minister	Alison Levitt, Baroness Levitt	6 September 2025 – 22 July 2026
Parliamentary Under-Secretary of State for Victims and Tackling Violence Against Women and Girls	Alex Davies-Jones	9 July 2024 – 12 May 2026
Parliamentary Under-Secretary of State for Victims and Tackling Violence Against Women and Girls	Catherine Atkinson	12 May 2026 – 22 July 2026
Parliamentary Under-Secretary of State for Sentencing and Youth Justice	Sir Nic Dakin (also Junior Lord of the Treasury) (paid as a whip)	23 July 2024 – 7 September 2025
Parliamentary Under-Secretary of State for Sentencing, Youth Justice and International	Jake Richards (also Assistant Whip) (paid as a whip)	7 September 2025 – 22 July 2026

Northern Ireland Office
Post	Incumbent	Term
Secretary of State for Northern Ireland	**Hilary Benn**	5 July 2024 – 20 July 2026
Parliamentary Under-Secretary of State	Fleur Anderson	9 July 2024 – 7 September 2025
Parliamentary Under-Secretary of State	Matthew Patrick	7 September 2025 – 22 July 2026

Department for Science, Innovation and Technology
Post	Incumbent	Term
Secretary of State for Science, Innovation and Technology	**Peter Kyle**	5 July 2024 – 5 September 2025
Secretary of State for Science, Innovation and Technology	**Liz Kendall**	5 September 2025 – 20 July 2026
Minister of State (Minister for Science, Research and Innovation)	Patrick Vallance, Baron Vallance of Balham	5 July 2024 – 6 September 2025
Minister of State (Minister for Science, Innovation, Research and Nuclear) (jointly with Department for Energy Security and Net Zero)	Patrick Vallance, Baron Vallance of Balham	6 September 2025 – 20 July 2026
Minister of State (Minister for Data Protection and Telecoms)	Sir Chris Bryant (also Minister for Creative Industries, Arts and Tourism)	8 July 2024 – 6 September 2025
Minister of State (Minister for Digital Government and Data)	Ian Murray (also Minister for Creative Industries, Media and Arts)	6 September 2025 – 21 July 2026
Parliamentary Under-Secretary of State (Minister for AI and Digital Government)	Feryal Clark	9 July 2024 – 7 September 2025
Parliamentary Under-Secretary of State (Minister for AI and Online Safety)	Kanishka Narayan	7 September 2025 – 20 July 2026
Parliamentary Under-Secretary of State (Minister for the Future Digital Economy and Online Safety)	Maggie Jones, Baroness Jones of Whitchurch (also Minister for Legislation in the Department for Business and Trade, also Baroness in Waiting) (paid as a whip)	9 July 2024 – 7 September 2025
Parliamentary Under-Secretary of State (Minister for Digital Economy) (jointly with Department for Business and Trade until 12 June 2026)	Liz Lloyd, Baroness Lloyd of Effra (also Baroness in Waiting until 12 June 2026)	11 September 2025 – 22 July 2026
Parliamentary Under-Secretary of State (Minister for Digital ID)	Josh Simons (also Parliamentary Secretary in the Cabinet Office)	9 January 2026 – 28 February 2026
Parliamentary Under-Secretary of State (Minister for Digital ID)	James Frith (also Parliamentary Secretary in the Cabinet Office)	3 March 2026 – 22 July 2026

Scotland Office
Post	Incumbent	Term
Secretary of State for Scotland	**Ian Murray**	5 July 2024 – 5 September 2025
Secretary of State for Scotland	**Douglas Alexander**	5 September 2025 – present
Parliamentary Under-Secretary of State	Kirsty McNeill	9 July 2024 – 21 July 2026

Department for Transport
Post	Incumbent	Term
Secretary of State for Transport	**Louise Haigh**	5 July 2024 – 28 November 2024
Secretary of State for Transport	**Heidi Alexander**	29 November 2024 – present
Minister of State (Minister for Rail)	Peter Hendy, Baron Hendy of Richmond Hill (unpaid)	8 July 2024 – present
Parliamentary Under-Secretary of State (Minister for the Future of Roads)	Lilian Greenwood (also Junior Lord of the Treasury from 16 September 2025) (paid as a whip)	9 July 2024 – 7 September 2025 (Note: In the September 2025 reshuffle, 3 MPs were appointed to roles on 7 September before being re-appointed to different roles 9 days later on 16 September.)
Parliamentary Under-Secretary of State (Minister for Local Transport)	Lilian Greenwood (also Junior Lord of the Treasury from 16 September 2025) (paid as a whip)	16 September 2025 – 22 July 2026
Parliamentary Under-Secretary of State (Minister for Local Transport)	Simon Lightwood	9 July 2024 – September 2025
Parliamentary Under-Secretary of State (Minister for Roads and Buses)	Simon Lightwood	September 2025 – 22 July 2026
Parliamentary Under-Secretary of State (Minister for Aviation, Maritime, and Security)	Mike Kane	9 July 2024 – 7 September 2025
Parliamentary Under-Secretary of State (Minister for Aviation, Maritime and Decarbonisation)	Keir Mather	7 September 2025 – present

HM Treasury
Post	Incumbent	Term
Chancellor of the Exchequer, Second Lord of the Treasury	**Rachel Reeves**	5 July 2024 – 20 July 2026
Chief Secretary to the Treasury	**Darren Jones**	5 July 2024 – 1 September 2025
Chief Secretary to the Treasury	**James Murray**	1 September 2025 – 14 May 2026
Chief Secretary to the Treasury	**Lucy Rigby**	14 May 2026 – 21 July 2026
Financial Secretary to the Treasury	Spencer Livermore, Baron Livermore	8 July 2024 – 21 July 2026
Minister of State (Minister for Investment) (jointly with Department for Business and Trade)	Poppy Gustafsson, Baroness Gustafsson (unpaid)	10 October 2024 – 6 September 2025
Minister of State (Minister for Investment) (jointly with Department for Business and Trade)	Jason Stockwood, Baron Stockwood (unpaid)	6 September 2025 – 21 July 2026
Economic Secretary to the Treasury (City Minister)	Tulip Siddiq	9 July 2024 – 14 January 2025
Economic Secretary to the Treasury (City Minister)	Emma Reynolds	14 January 2025 – 5 September 2025
Economic Secretary to the Treasury (City Minister)	Lucy Rigby	6 September 2025 – 14 May 2026
Economic Secretary to the Treasury (City Minister)	Rachel Blake	14 May 2026 – 21 July 2026
Exchequer Secretary to the Treasury	James Murray	9 July 2024 – 1 September 2025
Exchequer Secretary to the Treasury	Dan Tomlinson	1 September 2025 – present
Parliamentary Secretary	Emma Reynolds (also Minister for Pensions)	9 July 2024 – 14 January 2025
Parliamentary Secretary	Torsten Bell (also Minister for Pensions)	14 January 2025 – present

Wales Office
Post	Incumbent	Term
Secretary of State for Wales	**Jo Stevens**	5 July 2024 – 20 July 2026
Parliamentary Under-Secretary of State	Dame Nia Griffith (also Minister for Equalities from October 2024)	9 July 2024 – 7 September 2025
Parliamentary Under-Secretary of State	Anna McMorrin	7 September 2025 – present
Parliamentary Under-Secretary of State	Claire Hughes (also Assistant Whip) (paid as a whip)	16 September 2025 – present

Department for Work and Pensions
Post	Incumbent	Term
Secretary of State for Work and Pensions	**Liz Kendall**	5 July 2024 – 5 September 2025
Secretary of State for Work and Pensions	**Pat McFadden**	5 September 2025 – present
Minister of State (Minister for Employment)	Alison McGovern	8 July 2024 – 6 September 2025
Minister of State (Minister for Employment)	Dame Diana Johnson	6 September 2025 – 21 July 2026
Minister of State (Minister for Social Security and Disability) (jointly with Department for Education)	Sir Stephen Timms	8 July 2024 – present
Minister of State (Minister for Skills) (jointly with Department for Education from September 2025)	Jacqui Smith, Baroness Smith of Malvern (also Minister of State (Minister for Women and Equalities))	6 September 2025 – present
Minister of State (Minister for Lords)	Maeve Sherlock, Baroness Sherlock	17 December 2024 – present
Parliamentary Under-Secretary of State (Minister for Lords)	Maeve Sherlock, Baroness Sherlock	9 July 2024 – 17 December 2024
Parliamentary Under-Secretary of State (Minister for Pensions)	Emma Reynolds (also Parliamentary Secretary in the Treasury)	9 July 2024 – 14 January 2025
Parliamentary Under-Secretary of State (Minister for Pensions)	Torsten Bell (also Parliamentary Secretary in the Treasury)	14 January 2025 – present
Parliamentary Under-Secretary of State (Minister for Transformation)	Andrew Western	9 July 2024 – 21 July 2026

=== Law officers ===
Attorney General's Office
Post	Incumbent	Term
Attorney General, Advocate General for Northern Ireland	**Richard Hermer, Baron Hermer**	5 July 2024 – 20 July 2026
Solicitor General	Sarah Sackman	9 July 2024 – 2 December 2024
Solicitor General	Lucy Rigby	2 December 2024 – 6 September 2025
Solicitor General	Ellie Reeves	6 September 2025 – 20 July 2026

Office of the Advocate General for Scotland
Post	Incumbent	Term
Advocate General for Scotland	Catherine Smith, Baroness Smith of Cluny	29 August 2024 – present

=== Parliament ===
House Leaders
Post	Incumbent	Term
Lord President of the Council, Leader of the House of Commons	**Lucy Powell**	5 July 2024 – 5 September 2025
Lord President of the Council, Leader of the House of Commons	**Sir Alan Campbell** (full member of the Cabinet from 12 June 2026)	5 September 2025 – present
Lord Privy Seal, Leader of the House of Lords	**Angela Smith, Baroness Smith of Basildon**	5 July 2024 – present
Deputy Leader of the House of Lords	Ray Collins, Baron Collins of Highbury (also Parliamentary Under-Secretary of State (Africa) until September 2025, also Lord in Waiting until 12 June 2026)	9 July 2024 – present
Parliamentary Secretary	Ray Collins, Baron Collins of Highbury (also Parliamentary Under-Secretary of State (Africa) until September 2025, also Lord in Waiting until 12 June 2026)	12 June 2026 – 22 July 2026

House of Commons Whips
Post	Incumbent	Term
Parliamentary Secretary to the Treasury; Government Chief Whip	**Sir Alan Campbell**	5 July 2024 – 5 September 2025
Parliamentary Secretary to the Treasury; Government Chief Whip	**Jonathan Reynolds**	5 September 2025 – 20 July 2026
Treasurer of HM Household; Deputy Government Chief Whip	Sir Mark Tami	10 July 2024 – present
Comptroller of HM Household; Senior Government Whip	Chris Elmore	10 July 2024 – 7 September 2025
Comptroller of HM Household; Senior Government Whip	Nesil Caliskan	7 September 2025 – 12 May 2026
Comptroller of HM Household; Senior Government Whip	Gen Kitchen	12 May 2026 – present
Vice Chamberlain of HM Household; Senior Government Whip	Samantha Dixon	10 July 2024 – 6 September 2025
Vice Chamberlain of HM Household; Senior Government Whip	Lilian Greenwood	7 September 2025 – 16 September 2025
Vice Chamberlain of HM Household; Senior Government Whip	Sir Nic Dakin (also Parliamentary Under-Secretary of State for Sentencing and Youth Justice until 7 September 2025)	16 September 2025 – 21 July 2026
Junior Lords of the Treasury; Government Whips	Sir Nic Dakin (also Parliamentary Under-Secretary of State for Sentencing and Youth Justice until 7 September 2025)	10 July 2024 – 16 September 2025
Junior Lords of the Treasury; Government Whips	Vicky Foxcroft	10 July 2024 – 19 June 2025
Junior Lords of the Treasury; Government Whips	Jeff Smith	10 July 2024 – 7 September 2025
Junior Lords of the Treasury; Government Whips	Anna Turley	10 July 2024 – 6 September 2025
Junior Lords of the Treasury; Government Whips	Taiwo Owatemi	10 July 2024 – 22 July 2026
Junior Lords of the Treasury; Government Whips	Christian Wakeford	7 September 2025 – present
Junior Lords of the Treasury; Government Whips	Stephen Morgan	7 September 2025 – 12 June 2026
Junior Lords of the Treasury; Government Whips	Claire Hughes	7 September 2025 – 16 September 2025
Junior Lords of the Treasury; Government Whips	Lilian Greenwood (also Minister for Local Transport)	16 September 2025 – 22 July 2026
Junior Lords of the Treasury; Government Whips	Gen Kitchen	16 September 2025 – 12 May 2026
Junior Lords of the Treasury; Government Whips	Deirdre Costigan	12 May 2026 – 22 July 2026
Junior Lords of the Treasury; Government Whips	Jade Botterill	12 June 2026 – present
Assistant Whips; Assistant Government Whips	Gen Kitchen	10 July 2024 – 16 September 2025
Assistant Whips; Assistant Government Whips	Christian Wakeford	10 July 2024 – 7 September 2025
Assistant Whips; Assistant Government Whips	Keir Mather	10 July 2024 – 7 September 2025
Assistant Whips; Assistant Government Whips	Gerald Jones	10 July 2024 – 7 September 2025
Assistant Whips; Assistant Government Whips	Anna McMorrin	10 July 2024 – 7 September 2025
Assistant Whips; Assistant Government Whips	Martin McCluskey	18 July 2024 – 7 September 2025
Assistant Whips; Assistant Government Whips	Kate Dearden	18 July 2024 – 7 September 2025
Assistant Whips; Assistant Government Whips	Jake Richards (also Parliamentary Under-Secretary of State for Sentencing, Youth Justice and International)	7 September 2025 – 22 July 2026
Assistant Whips; Assistant Government Whips	Mark Ferguson	7 September 2025 – 22 July 2026
Assistant Whips; Assistant Government Whips	Gregor Poynton	7 September 2025 – 22 July 2026
Assistant Whips; Assistant Government Whips	Imogen Walker	7 September 2025 – 22 July 2026
Assistant Whips; Assistant Government Whips	Jade Botterill	7 September 2025 – 12 June 2026
Assistant Whips; Assistant Government Whips	Deirdre Costigan	7 September 2025 – 12 May 2026
Assistant Whips; Assistant Government Whips	Claire Hughes (also Parliamentary Under-Secretary of State in the Wales Office)	16 September 2025 – 22 July 2026
Assistant Whips; Assistant Government Whips	Shaun Davies	12 May 2026 – 22 July 2026
Assistant Whips; Assistant Government Whips	Emma Foody	12 June 2026 – 21 July 2026

House of Lords Whips
Post	Incumbent	Term
Captain of the Honourable Corps of Gentlemen-at-Arms; Government Chief Whip	Roy Kennedy, Baron Kennedy of Southwark	10 July 2024 – present
Captain of the King's Bodyguard of the Yeomen of the Guard; Deputy Government Chief Whip	Margaret Wheeler, Baroness Wheeler	10 July 2024 – 22 July 2026
Lords and Baronesses in Waiting; Government Whips	Ray Collins, Baron Collins of Highbury (also Deputy Leader of the House of Lords, also Parliamentary Under-Secretary of State (Africa) until September 2025)	9 July 2024 – 12 June 2026
Lords and Baronesses in Waiting; Government Whips	Sharon Taylor, Baroness Taylor of Stevenage (also Lords Minister for Housing and Local Government)	9 July 2024 – 12 June 2026
Lords and Baronesses in Waiting; Government Whips	Frederick Ponsonby, Baron Ponsonby of Shulbrede (also Parliamentary Under-Secretary of State and Lords Minister in the Ministry of Justice)	9 July 2024 – 6 September 2025
Lords and Baronesses in Waiting; Government Whips	Maggie Jones, Baroness Jones of Whitchurch (also Minister for Legislation in the Department for Business and Trade, also Minister for the Future Digital Economy and Online Safety)	9 July 2024 – 7 September 2025
Lords and Baronesses in Waiting; Government Whips	Ruth Anderson, Baroness Anderson of Stoke-on-Trent (also Parliamentary Secretary in the Cabinet Office from March 2026)	11 July 2024 – 12 June 2026
Lords and Baronesses in Waiting; Government Whips	Sonny Leong, Baron Leong (unpaid)	11 July 2024 – 12 June 2026
Lords and Baronesses in Waiting; Government Whips	Fiona Twycross, Baroness Twycross (also Minister for Gambling and Heritage, and Lords Minister until September 2025, also Minister for Museums, Heritage and Gambling, and Lords Minister from September 2025)	11 July 2024 – 12 June 2026
Lords and Baronesses in Waiting; Government Whips	Judith Blake, Baroness Blake of Leeds	11 July 2024 – present
Lords and Baronesses in Waiting; Government Whips	John Cryer, Baron Cryer (unpaid)	8 October 2024 – 14 February 2025
Lords and Baronesses in Waiting; Government Whips	Claude Moraes, Baron Moraes (unpaid)	10 February 2025 – 22 July 2025
Lords and Baronesses in Waiting; Government Whips	Phil Wilson, Baron Wilson of Sedgefield (unpaid)	10 February 2025 – present
Lords and Baronesses in Waiting; Government Whips	Michael Katz, Baron Katz	11 April 2025 – present
Lords and Baronesses in Waiting; Government Whips	Gerard Lemos, Baron Lemos (unpaid)	22 July 2025 – 12 June 2026
Lords and Baronesses in Waiting; Government Whips	Liz Lloyd, Baroness Lloyd of Effra (also Minister for Digital Economy)	11 September 2025 – 12 June 2026
Lords and Baronesses in Waiting; Government Whips	Jane Ramsey, Baroness Ramsey of Wall Heath	12 June 2026 – present
Lords and Baronesses in Waiting; Government Whips	Margaret Curran, Baroness Curran	12 June 2026 – 22 July 2026

== Non-ministerial appointments ==
=== Parliamentary Private Secretaries ===
In July 2025, analysis by LabourList and PLMR suggested that there were 38 Parliamentary Private Secretaries (PPSs). On 11 September 2025, an updated PPS list was issued following the reshuffle. As of 19 November 2025, an updated list of Parliamentary Private Secretaries was published on GOV.UK.

Post	Incumbent	Term
Prime Minister's Office
Parliamentary Private Secretary to the Prime Minister	Liz Twist	17 July 2024 – 11 September 2025
Parliamentary Private Secretary to the Prime Minister	Chris Ward	19 July 2024 – 6 September 2025
Parliamentary Private Secretary to the Prime Minister	Catherine Fookes	11 September 2025 – present
Parliamentary Private Secretary to the Prime Minister	Abena Oppong-Asare	11 September 2025 – present
Parliamentary Private Secretary to the Prime Minister	Jon Pearce	11 September 2025 – present
Parliamentary Private Secretary to the Deputy Prime Minister	Harpreet Uppal (also PPS to MHCLG)	19 July 2024 – 5 September 2025
Parliamentary Private Secretary to the Deputy Prime Minister	Navendu Mishra (also PPS to MHCLG)	19 July 2024 – 16 May 2025
Cabinet Office
Parliamentary Private Secretary to the Cabinet Office	Satvir Kaur	19 July 2024 – 7 September 2025
Parliamentary Private Secretary to the Cabinet Office	Torsten Bell	19 July 2024 – 14 January 2025
Parliamentary Private Secretary to the Cabinet Office	Josh MacAlister	February 2025 – 7 September 2025
Parliamentary Private Secretary to the Cabinet Office	Claire Hazelgrove	11 September 2025 – present
Parliamentary Private Secretary to the Cabinet Office	Naushabah Khan	11 September 2025 – 11 May 2026
Parliamentary Private Secretary to the Cabinet Office	Alice Macdonald	11 September 2025 – present
Parliamentary Private Secretary to the Cabinet Office	Sean Woodcock	11 May 2026 – present
Department for Business and Trade
Parliamentary Private Secretary to the Department for Business and Trade	Preet Kaur Gill	19 July 2024 – 11 September 2025
Parliamentary Private Secretary to the Department for Business and Trade	Claire Hughes	14 November 2024 – 7 September 2025
Parliamentary Private Secretary to the Department for Business and Trade	Luke Charters	11 September 2025 – 21 May 2026
Parliamentary Private Secretary to the Department for Business and Trade	Jeevun Sandher	11 September 2025 – present
Parliamentary Private Secretary to the Department for Business and Trade	Marie Tidball	11 September 2025 – present
Department for Culture, Media and Sport
Parliamentary Private Secretary to the Department for Culture, Media and Sport	Kim Leadbeater	19 July 2024 – 11 September 2025
Parliamentary Private Secretary to the Department for Culture, Media and Sport	Matthew Patrick (also PPS to DSIT)	14 November 2024 – 7 September 2025
Parliamentary Private Secretary to the Department for Culture, Media and Sport	Jack Abbott	11 September 2025 – present
Parliamentary Private Secretary to the Department for Culture, Media and Sport	Lola McEvoy	11 September 2025 – present
Ministry of Defence
Parliamentary Private Secretary to the Ministry of Defence	Pamela Nash	19 July 2024 – 11 June 2026
Parliamentary Private Secretary to the Ministry of Defence	Rachel Hopkins	19 July 2024 – 11 June 2026
Parliamentary Private Secretary to the Ministry of Defence	Shaun Davies	11 September 2025 – 12 May 2026
Department for Education
Parliamentary Private Secretary to the Department for Education	Alan Strickland	19 July 2024 – present
Parliamentary Private Secretary to the Department for Education	Emma Foody	19 July 2024 – 12 June 2026
Parliamentary Private Secretary to the Department for Education	Amanda Martin	11 September 2025 – present
Department for Energy Security and Net Zero
Parliamentary Private Secretary to the Department for Energy Security and Net Zero	Katie White	19 July 2024 – 7 September 2025
Parliamentary Private Secretary to the Department for Energy Security and Net Zero	Chris McDonald	19 July 2024 – 11 September 2025
Parliamentary Private Secretary to the Department for Energy Security and Net Zero	Anna Gelderd	11 September 2025 – present
Parliamentary Private Secretary to the Department for Energy Security and Net Zero	Connor Rand	11 September 2025 – present
Parliamentary Private Secretary to the Department for Energy Security and Net Zero	Rachel Blake	November 2025 – 14 May 2026
Parliamentary Private Secretary to the Department for Energy Security and Net Zero	Lloyd Hatton	20 May 2026 – present
Department for Environment, Food and Rural Affairs
Parliamentary Private Secretary to the Department for Environment, Food and Rural Affairs	Kanishka Narayan	19 July 2024 – 7 September 2025
Parliamentary Private Secretary to the Department for Environment, Food and Rural Affairs	Josh Simons	14 November 2024 – December 2024
Parliamentary Private Secretary to the Department for Environment, Food and Rural Affairs	Claire Hazelgrove	December 2024 – February 2025
Parliamentary Private Secretary to the Department for Environment, Food and Rural Affairs	Laura Kyrke-Smith	21 February 2025 – 11 September 2025
Parliamentary Private Secretary to the Department for Environment, Food and Rural Affairs	Andrew Pakes	11 September 2025 – present
Parliamentary Private Secretary to the Department for Environment, Food and Rural Affairs	Tom Rutland	11 September 2025 – 11 May 2026
Parliamentary Private Secretary to the Department for Environment, Food and Rural Affairs	Jayne Kirkham	11 May 2026 – present
Foreign, Commonwealth and Development Office
Parliamentary Private Secretary to the Foreign, Commonwealth and Development Office	Alan Gemmell	19 July 2024 – 11 September 2025
Parliamentary Private Secretary to the Foreign, Commonwealth and Development Office	Jessica Toale	19 July 2024 – present
Parliamentary Private Secretary to the Foreign, Commonwealth and Development Office	Catherine Atkinson	11 September 2025 – 12 May 2026
Parliamentary Private Secretary to the Foreign, Commonwealth and Development Office	Johanna Baxter	20 May 2026 – present
Department of Health and Social Care
Parliamentary Private Secretary to the Department of Health and Social Care	Zubir Ahmed	19 July 2024 – 6 September 2025
Parliamentary Private Secretary to the Department of Health and Social Care	Ashley Dalton	19 July 2024 – 10 February 2025
Parliamentary Private Secretary to the Department of Health and Social Care	Deirdre Costigan	21 February 2025 – 7 September 2025
Parliamentary Private Secretary to the Department of Health and Social Care	Joe Morris	21 February 2025 – 11 May 2026
Parliamentary Private Secretary to the Department of Health and Social Care	Steve Race	11 September 2025 – 19 May 2026
Parliamentary Private Secretary to the Department of Health and Social Care	Rosie Wrighting	11 September 2025 – 15 May 2026
Parliamentary Private Secretary to the Department of Health and Social Care	David Burton-Sampson	11 May 2026 – present
Parliamentary Private Secretary to the Department of Health and Social Care	Laura Kyrke-Smith	20 May 2026 – present
Parliamentary Private Secretary to the Department of Health and Social Care	Oliver Ryan	20 May 2026 – present
Home Office
Parliamentary Private Secretary to the Home Office	Jade Botterill	19 July 2024 – 7 September 2025
Parliamentary Private Secretary to the Home Office	Louise Sandher-Jones	19 July 2024 – 6 September 2025
Parliamentary Private Secretary to the Home Office	Sarah Coombes	11 September 2025 – present
Parliamentary Private Secretary to the Home Office	Alan Gemmell	11 September 2025 – 25 March 2026
Parliamentary Private Secretary to the Home Office	Sally Jameson	11 September 2025 – 11 May 2026
Parliamentary Private Secretary to the Home Office	Michael Payne	11 May 2026 – present
Ministry of Housing, Communities and Local Government
Parliamentary Private Secretary to the Ministry of Housing, Communities and Local Government	Harpreet Uppal (also PPS to DPM until Sep 2025)	19 July 2024 – present
Parliamentary Private Secretary to the Ministry of Housing, Communities and Local Government	Navendu Mishra (also PPS to DPM)	19 July 2024 – 16 May 2025
Parliamentary Private Secretary to the Ministry of Housing, Communities and Local Government	Mark Ferguson	21 February 2025 – 7 September 2025
Parliamentary Private Secretary to the Ministry of Housing, Communities and Local Government	Tom Hayes	11 September 2025 – present
Parliamentary Private Secretary to the Ministry of Housing, Communities and Local Government	Laura Kyrke-Smith	11 September 2025 – 20 May 2026
Parliamentary Private Secretary to the Ministry of Housing, Communities and Local Government	Chris Vince	20 May 2026 – present
Ministry of Justice
Parliamentary Private Secretary to the Ministry of Justice	Sally Jameson	19 July 2024 – 11 September 2025
Parliamentary Private Secretary to the Ministry of Justice	Lucy Rigby	14 November 2024 – 2 December 2024
Parliamentary Private Secretary to the Ministry of Justice	Josh Simons	December 2024 – 7 September 2025
Parliamentary Private Secretary to the Ministry of Justice	James Frith	11 September 2025 – 3 March 2026
Parliamentary Private Secretary to the Ministry of Justice	Joe Powell	11 September 2025 – present
Parliamentary Private Secretary to the Ministry of Justice	Melanie Ward	11 September 2025 – 11 May 2026
Parliamentary Private Secretary to the Ministry of Justice	Linsey Farnsworth	11 May 2026 – present
Northern Ireland Office
Parliamentary Private Secretary to the Northern Ireland Office	Matt Rodda	19 July 2024 – present
Department for Science, Innovation and Technology
Parliamentary Private Secretary to the Department for Science, Innovation and Technology	Callum Anderson	19 July 2024 – present
Parliamentary Private Secretary to the Department for Science, Innovation and Technology	Matthew Patrick (also PPS to DCMS)	14 November 2024 – 7 September 2025
Parliamentary Private Secretary to the Department for Science, Innovation and Technology	Preet Kaur Gill	11 September 2025 – 12 May 2026
Parliamentary Private Secretary to the Department for Science, Innovation and Technology	Lauren Sullivan	20 May 2026 – present
Scotland Office
Parliamentary Private Secretary to the Scotland Office	Melanie Ward	19 July 2024 – 11 September 2025
Parliamentary Private Secretary to the Scotland Office	Frank McNally	11 September 2025 – present
Parliamentary Private Secretary to the Scotland Office	Alison Taylor	11 September 2025 – present
Department for Transport
Parliamentary Private Secretary to the Department for Transport	Liam Conlon	19 July 2024 – present
Parliamentary Private Secretary to the Department for Transport	Julie Minns	14 November 2024 – present
HM Treasury
Parliamentary Private Secretary to HM Treasury	Alistair Strathern	19 July 2024 – present
Parliamentary Private Secretary to HM Treasury	Imogen Walker	19 July 2024 – 7 September 2025
Parliamentary Private Secretary to HM Treasury	Claire Hazelgrove	21 February 2025 – 11 September 2025
Parliamentary Private Secretary to HM Treasury	Helena Dollimore	11 September 2025 – present
Parliamentary Private Secretary to HM Treasury	Kirith Entwistle	11 September 2025 – present
Wales Office
Parliamentary Private Secretary to the Wales Office	Becky Gittins	19 July 2024 – present
Parliamentary Private Secretary to the Wales Office	Gill German	November 2025 – present
Department for Work and Pensions
Parliamentary Private Secretary to the Department for Work and Pensions	Olivia Bailey	19 July 2024 – 7 September 2025
Parliamentary Private Secretary to the Department for Work and Pensions	Gordon McKee	14 November 2024 – 11 May 2026
Parliamentary Private Secretary to the Department for Work and Pensions	Natalie Fleet	11 September 2025 – 12 May 2026
Parliamentary Private Secretary to the Department for Work and Pensions	David Pinto-Duschinsky	November 2025 – present
Parliamentary Private Secretary to the Department for Work and Pensions	Tim Roca	11 May 2026 – present
Parliamentary Private Secretary to the Department for Work and Pensions	Elaine Stewart	20 May 2026 – present
Law Officers
Parliamentary Private Secretary to the Law Officers	Alex Barros-Curtis	21 February 2025 – present
Parliamentary Private Secretary to the Law Officers	Kevin Bonavia	5 December 2024 – present
House Leaders
Parliamentary Private Secretary to the Leader of the House of Commons	Sarah Coombes	19 July 2024 – 11 September 2025
Parliamentary Private Secretary to the Leader of the House of Commons	Leigh Ingham	11 September 2025 – present
Parliamentary Private Secretary to the Leader of the House of Lords	Shaun Davies	19 July 2024 – 6 September 2024
Parliamentary Private Secretary to the Leader of the House of Lords	Jack Abbott	21 February 2025 – 11 September 2025
Parliamentary Private Secretary to the Leader of the House of Lords	Paul Waugh	11 September 2025 – present

=== Prime Minister's Office ===
Office	Incumbent	Term
Downing Street Chief of Staff	Sue Gray	5 July 2024 – 6 October 2024
Downing Street Chief of Staff	Morgan McSweeney	6 October 2024 – 8 February 2026
Deputy Downing Street Chief of Staff	Vidhya Alakeson; Jill Cuthbertson	6 October 2024 – present
Principal Private Secretary to the Prime Minister	Nin Pandit	6 October 2024 – 28 August 2025
Principal Private Secretary to the Prime Minister	Dan York-Smith	1 September 2025 – present
Downing Street Executive Director of Government Communications	Tim Allan	3 September 2025 – 9 February 2026
Downing Street Director of Communications	Matthew Doyle	5 July 2024 – 28 March 2025
Downing Street Director of Communications	Steph Driver	28 March 2025 – 25 September 2025
Downing Street Director of Strategic Communications	James Lyons	6 October 2024 – 1 September 2025
Deputy Downing Street Director of Communications	Steph Driver	July 2024 – 28 March 2025
Downing Street Press Secretary	Sophie Nazemi	July 2024 – present
Prime Minister's Official Spokesperson	David Pares	February 2024 – present
Political Secretary to the Prime Minister		
Downing Street Head of Political Strategy	Paul Ovenden	July 2024 – 15 September 2025
Director of the Number 10 Policy Unit	Stuart Ingham	5 July 2024 – present
Chief Economic Advisor to the Prime Minister	Minouche Shafik, Baroness Shafik	1 September 2025 – present

=== Church Commissioner ===
Office	Incumbent	Term
Second Church Estates Commissioner	Marsha de Cordova	7 October 2024 – present

== Departures from the Starmer ministry ==
This is a list of departures from the Starmer ministry since forming a government on 6 July 2024. It does not include ministers who left government as part of the 2025 British cabinet reshuffle or those who left government following Starmer's resignation as prime minister on 20 July 2026.

=== Ministerial departures ===
Minister (Cabinet ministers shown in bold or bold italics)	Office	Date of leaving government	Reason
**Louise Haigh**	**Secretary of State for Transport**	28 November 2024	Resigned after admitting she had pleaded guilty to a criminal offence relating to misleading police in 2014
Tulip Siddiq	Economic Secretary to the Treasury (City Minister)	14 January 2025	Resigned over corruption investigation and links to the government of Sheikh Hasina
Andrew Gwynne	Parliamentary Under-Secretary of State for Public Health and Prevention	8 February 2025	Sacked over comments posted on a WhatsApp group.
John Cryer, Baron Cryer	Lord in Waiting	14 February 2025	Resigned
**Anneliese Dodds**	**Minister of State (Development),** **Minister of State (Minister for Women and Equalities)**	28 February 2025	Resigned over government decision to cut the foreign aid budget to 0.3% of GNI
Philip Hunt, Baron Hunt of Kings Heath	Minister of State (Minister for Energy Security and Net Zero)	22 May 2025	Resigned
Margaret Curran, Baroness Curran	Minister of State (Minister for Energy Security and Net Zero)	6 June 2025	Resigned due to health reasons
Vicky Foxcroft	Junior Lord of the Treasury	19 June 2025	Resigned over government decision to cut disability benefits
Claude Moraes, Baron Moraes	Lord in Waiting	22 July 2025	Resigned
Rushanara Ali	Parliamentary Under-Secretary of State (Minister for Homelessness and Democracy)	7 August 2025	Resigned over claims she evicted tenants from a property she owns and then increased the rent by hundreds of pounds
**Angela Rayner**	**Deputy Prime Minister,** **Secretary of State for Housing, Communities and Local Government**	5 September 2025	Resigned after being found to have failed to pay enough tax on flat; she was later cleared of deliberate wrongdoing in May 2026
Poppy Gustafsson, Baroness Gustafsson	Minister of State (Minister for Investment)	5 September 2025	Resigned
Josh Simons	Parliamentary Secretary for the Cabinet Office	28 February 2026	Resigned
Ashley Dalton	Parliamentary Under-Secretary of State for Public Health and Prevention	2 March 2026	Resigned
Miatta Fahnbulleh	Parliamentary Under-Secretary of State for Devolution, Faith and Communities	12 May 2026	Resigned following the 2026 United Kingdom local elections.
Jess Phillips	Parliamentary Under-Secretary of State for Safeguarding and Violence Against Women and Girls	12 May 2026	Resigned following the 2026 United Kingdom local elections.
Alex Davies-Jones	Parliamentary Under-Secretary of State for Victims and Tackling Violence Against Women and Girls	12 May 2026	Resigned following the 2026 United Kingdom local elections.
Zubir Ahmed	Parliamentary Under-Secretary of State for Health Innovation and Safety	12 May 2026	Resigned following the 2026 United Kingdom local elections.
**Wes Streeting**	**Secretary of State for Health and Social Care**	14 May 2026	Resigned following the 2026 United Kingdom local elections.
**John Healey**	**Secretary of State for Defence**	11 June 2026	Resigned citing insufficient funds being allocated to the Defence Investment Plan.
Al Carns	Parliamentary Under-Secretary of State for the Armed Forces	11 June 2026	Resigned citing insufficient funds being allocated to the Defence Investment Plan.

=== Non-ministerial departures ===
Name	Office	Date of leaving government	Reason
Sue Gray	Downing Street Chief of Staff	6 October 2024	Resigned amid intense commentary around her position
Matthew Doyle	Downing Street Director of Communications	28 March 2025	Resigned.
Navendu Mishra	Parliamentary Private Secretary to the Deputy Prime Minister and the Ministry of Housing, Communities and Local Government (non-ministerial role)	16 May 2025	Resigned
Nin Pandit	Principal Private Secretary to the Prime Minister of the United Kingdom	28 August 2025	Resigned
James Lyons	Downing Street Strategic Communications Director	1 September 2025	Resigned
Peter Mandelson, Baron Mandelson	British Ambassador to the United States	11 September 2025	Sacked following the release of documents revealing the extent of his ties to the convicted sex offender Jeffrey Epstein
Paul Ovenden	Downing Street Head of Political Strategy	15 September 2025	Resigned after offensive and sexually explicit messages, relating to Diane Abbott, were discovered
Steph Driver	Downing Street Director of Communications	25 September 2025	Resigned
Morgan McSweeney	Downing Street Chief of Staff	8 February 2026	Resigned amid internal party pressures stemming from his involvement in recommending the appointment of Mandelson
Tim Allan	Downing Street Director of Communications	9 February 2026	Resigned following the resignation of McSweeney.
Alan Gemmell	Parliamentary Private Secretary to the Home Office	25 March 2026	Resigned
Tom Rutland	Parliamentary Private Secretary to the Department for Environment, Food and Rural Affairs	11 May 2026	Resigned amid the 2026 Labour Party leadership crisis following the 2026 United Kingdom local elections, calling on Starmer to set out a timetable for his resignation by September 2026.
Joe Morris	Parliamentary Private Secretary to the Department of Health and Social Care	11 May 2026	Resigned amid the 2026 Labour Party leadership crisis following the 2026 United Kingdom local elections, calling on Starmer to set out a timetable for his resignation by September 2026.
Naushabah Khan	Parliamentary Private Secretary to the Cabinet Office	11 May 2026	Resigned amid the 2026 Labour Party leadership crisis following the 2026 United Kingdom local elections, calling on Starmer to set out a timetable for his resignation by September 2026.
Sally Jameson	Parliamentary Private Secretary to the Home Office	11 May 2026	Resigned amid the 2026 Labour Party leadership crisis following the 2026 United Kingdom local elections, calling on Starmer to set out a timetable for his resignation by September 2026.
Melanie Ward	Parliamentary Private Secretary to the Ministry of Justice	11 May 2026	Resigned amid the 2026 Labour Party leadership crisis following the 2026 United Kingdom local elections, calling on Starmer to set out a timetable for his resignation by September 2026.
Gordon McKee	Parliamentary Private Secretary to the Department for Work and Pensions	11 May 2026	Resigned amid the 2026 Labour Party leadership crisis following the 2026 United Kingdom local elections, calling on Starmer to set out a timetable for his resignation by September 2026.
Rosie Wrighting	Parliamentary Private Secretary to the Department of Health and Social Care	15 May 2026	Resigned amid the 2026 Labour Party leadership crisis following the 2026 United Kingdom local elections, calling on Starmer to set out a timetable for his resignation by September 2026.
Steve Race	Parliamentary Private Secretary to the Department of Health and Social Care	19 May 2026	Resigned amid the 2026 Labour Party leadership crisis following the 2026 United Kingdom local elections, calling on Starmer to set out a timetable for his resignation by September 2026.
Luke Charters	Parliamentary Private Secretary to the Department for Business and Trade	21 May 2026	Resigned
Pamela Nash	Parliamentary Private Secretary to the Ministry of Defence	11 June 2026	Resigned following Defence Secretary John Healey's resignation.
Rachel Hopkins	Parliamentary Private Secretary to the Ministry of Defence	11 June 2026	Resigned following Defence Secretary John Healey's resignation.

== Notes ==
Preceded by Sunak ministry	Government of the United Kingdom; 2024–2026	Succeeded by Burnham ministry
