= 2025 British cabinet reshuffle =

First cabinet reshuffle undertaken by Keir Starmer

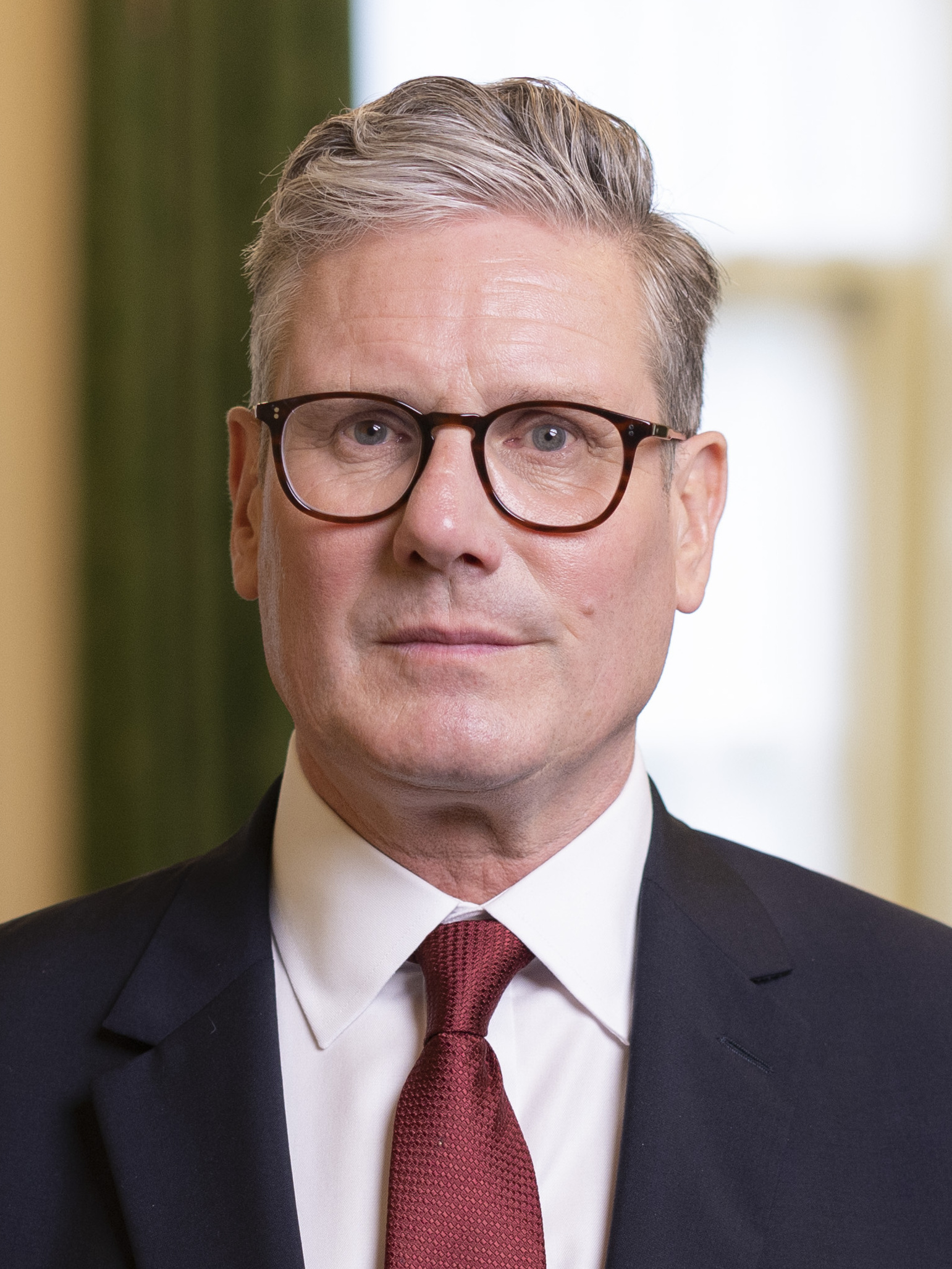
Keir Starmer

British Prime Minister Keir Starmer carried out the first cabinet reshuffle of his premiership in 2025. A minor reshuffle of posts in 10 Downing Street began on 1 September 2025. On 5 September, following the resignation of the deputy prime minister, Angela Rayner, after she was found to have broken the ministerial code, a full reshuffle of the cabinet was launched.

== Media speculation ==
The reshuffle was speculated to take place in the late spring or early summer of 2025. Ministers such as Lisa Nandy and Bridget Phillipson were discussed as possible changes. Number 10 denied that Chancellor of the Exchequer Rachel Reeves would be removed. Louise Haigh told the media that northern female MPs were likely to be demoted. Speculation increased following the 2025 United Kingdom local elections.

== Background ==
A minor reshuffle of posts in 10 Downing Street began on 1 September 2025.

- Darren Jones (Chief Secretary to the Prime Minister)
- James Murray (Chief Secretary to the Treasury)
- Dan Tomlinson (Exchequer Secretary to the Treasury)
- Baroness Shafik (adviser)
- James Lyons (departed as strategic communications director)
- Nin Pandit (departed as Principal Private Secretary to the Prime Minister of the United Kingdom)

Following the resignation of Deputy Prime Minister Angela Rayner, after she was found to have breached the ministerial code, one of the biggest cabinet reshuffles in years started on 5 September. Starmer planned to enact the full reshuffle later in the parliamentary term, but brought this forward in light of Rayner's resignation.

== Changes ==
Below are the changes made in the reshuffle.

=== Cabinet ministers ===
Colour key
- Joined Cabinet
- Left Cabinet

| Name | Position before reshuffle | Position after reshuffle |
|---|---|---|
| Angela Rayner | Deputy Prime Minister, Secretary of State for Housing, Communities and Local Government | Resigned |
| David Lammy | Secretary of State for Foreign, Commonwealth and Development Affairs | Lord Chancellor and Secretary of State for Justice, Deputy Prime Minister |
| Yvette Cooper | Secretary of State for the Home Department | Secretary of State for Foreign, Commonwealth and Development Affairs |
| Shabana Mahmood | Lord Chancellor, Secretary of State for Justice | Secretary of State for the Home Department |
| Steve Reed | Secretary of State for Environment, Food and Rural Affairs | Secretary of State for Housing, Communities and Local Government |
| Emma Reynolds | Economic Secretary to the Treasury, City Minister | Secretary of State for Environment, Food and Rural Affairs |
| Darren Jones | Chief Secretary to the Treasury | Chief Secretary to the Prime Minister (from 1 September), Chancellor of the Duchy of Lancaster (from 5 September), Minister for Intergovernmental Relations (from 6 September) |
| Pat McFadden | Chancellor of the Duchy of Lancaster, Minister for Intergovernmental Relations (until 6 September) | Secretary of State for Work and Pensions |
| Liz Kendall | Secretary of State for Work and Pensions | Secretary of State for Science, Innovation and Technology |
| Peter Kyle | Secretary of State for Science, Innovation and Technology | Secretary of State for Business and Trade, President of the Board of Trade |
| Jonathan Reynolds | Secretary of State for Business and Trade, President of the Board of Trade | Parliamentary Secretary to the Treasury, (Chief Whip) |
| Alan Campbell | Chief Whip of the House of Commons, Parliamentary Secretary to the Treasury | Leader of the House of Commons, Lord President of the Council |
| Lucy Powell | Lord President of the Council, Leader of the House of Commons | Left government |
| Douglas Alexander | Minister of State at the Cabinet Office, Minister of State for Trade Policy and Economic Security | Secretary of State for Scotland |
| Ian Murray | Secretary of State for Scotland | Left Cabinet, but remained in government (see junior ministers table below for details) |
| Ellie Reeves | Minister of State (Minister without Portfolio) * | Left Cabinet, but remained in government (see junior ministers table below for details) |
| Anna Turley | Junior Lord of the Treasury (Government Whip) | Minister of State (Minister without Portfolio) * |
| James Murray | Exchequer Secretary to the Treasury | Chief Secretary to the Treasury |

NB * Also appointed to the non-government role of Chair of the Labour Party.

=== Junior ministers ===
Colour key
- Joined government
- Left government

| Name | Position before reshuffle | Position after reshuffle |
|---|---|---|
| The Lord Stockwood | None (Note: To be conferred a life peerage.) | Minister of State (Minister for Investment) at the Department for Business and Trade and HM Treasury |
| The Baroness Gustafsson | Minister of State for Investment | Resigned |
| Jim McMahon | Minister of State for Local Government and English Devolution | Left government |
| Daniel Zeichner | Minister of State for Food Security and Rural Affairs | Left government |
| Justin Madders | Parliamentary Under-Secretary of State for Employment Rights, Competition and Markets | Left government |
| Catherine West | Parliamentary Under-Secretary of State for Indo-Pacific | Left government |
| Maria Eagle | Minister of State for Defence Procurement and Industry | Left government |
| Abena Oppong-Asare | Parliamentary Secretary in the Cabinet Office | Left government, but appointed Parliamentary Private Secretary to the Prime Minister (non-ministerial role) |
| The Lord Ponsonby of Shulbrede | Parliamentary Under-Secretary of State for Justice | Left government |
| The Lord Khan of Burnley | Parliamentary Under-Secretary of State for Faith, Communities and Resettlement | Left government |
| Catherine McKinnell | Minister of State for School Standards | Left government |
| Dan Tomlinson | Backbench MP | Exchequer Secretary to the Treasury |
| Michael Shanks | Parliamentary Under-Secretary of State for Energy | Minister of State (Minister for Energy) at the Department for Energy Security and Net Zero |
| Alison McGovern | Minister of State for Employment | Minister of State (Minister for Local Government and Homelessness) at the Ministry of Housing, Communities and Local Government |
| Lucy Rigby | Solicitor General for England and Wales | Economic Secretary to the Treasury |
| Dan Jarvis | Minister of State for Security | Minister of State (Minister for Security) at the Home Office and the Cabinet Office |
| The Lord Vallance of Balham | Minister of State for Science, Research and Innovation | Minister of State (Minister for Science, Innovation, Research and Nuclear) at the Department for Energy Security and Net Zero and the Department for Science, Innovation and Technology |
| Angela Eagle | Minister of State for Border Security and Asylum | Minister of State (Minister for Food Security and Rural Affairs) at the Department for Environment, Food and Rural Affairs |
| Diana Johnson | Minister of State for Policing and Crime Prevention | Minister of State at the Department for Work and Pensions |
| Sarah Jones | Minister of State for Industry | Minister of State (Minister for Policing and Crime) at the Home Office |
| Chris Bryant | Minister of State for Data Protection and Telecoms, Minister of State for Creative Industries, Arts and Tourism | Minister of State (Minister for Trade) at the Department for Business and Trade |
| Luke Pollard | Parliamentary Under-Secretary of State for the Armed Forces | Minister of State (Minister for Defence Readiness and Industry) at the Ministry of Defence |
| Georgia Gould | Parliamentary Secretary in the Cabinet Office | Minister of State (Minister for School Standards) at the Department for Education |
| Ellie Reeves | Minister of State (Minister without Portfolio) | Solicitor General |
| Ian Murray | Secretary of State for Scotland | Minister of State (Minister for Creative Industries, Media and Arts) at the Department for Culture, Media and Sport, Minister of State (Minister for Digital Government and Data) at the Department for Science, Innovation and Technology |
| Mike Tapp | Backbench MP | Parliamentary Under-Secretary of State (Minister for Migration and Citizenship) at the Home Office |
| Louise Sandher-Jones | Parliamentary Private Secretary to the Home Office (non-ministerial role) | Parliamentary Under-Secretary of State (Minister for Veterans and People) at the Ministry of Defence |
| The Baroness Levitt | Backbench peer | Parliamentary Under-Secretary of State at the Ministry of Justice |
| Chris Ward | Parliamentary Private Secretary to the Prime Minister (non-ministerial role) | Parliamentary Secretary in the Cabinet Office |
| Seema Malhotra | Parliamentary Under-Secretary of State for Migration and Citizenship, Parliamentary Under-Secretary of State for Equalities | Parliamentary Under-Secretary of State (Minister for Indo-Pacific) at the Foreign, Commonwealth and Development Office, Parliamentary Under-Secretary of State (Minister for Equalities) at the Department for Education |
| Miatta Fahnbulleh | Parliamentary Under-Secretary of State for Energy Consumers | Parliamentary Under-Secretary of State (Minister for Devolution, Faith and Communities) at the Ministry of Housing, Communities and Local Government |
| Samantha Dixon | Vice-Chamberlain of HM Household (Senior Government Whip) | Parliamentary Under-Secretary of State (Minister for Building Safety, Fire and Democracy) at the Ministry of Housing, Communities and Local Government |
| Zubir Ahmed | Parliamentary Private Secretary to the Department of Health and Social Care (non-ministerial role) | Parliamentary Under-Secretary of State for Health Innovation and Safety at the Department of Health and Social Care |
| The Baroness Smith of Malvern | Minister of State for Skills (Department for Education), Minister of State for Women and Equalities | Minister of State (Minister for Women and Equalities), Minister of State (Minister for Skills) at the Department for Education and the Department for Work and Pensions |
| Alex Norris | Parliamentary Under-Secretary of State for Building Safety, Fire and Local Growth | Minister of State (Minister for Border Security and Asylum) at the Home Office |
| Chris Elmore | Comptroller of HM Household (Senior Government Whip) | Parliamentary Under-Secretary of State (Multilateral, Human Rights, Latin America and Caribbean) at the Foreign, Commonwealth and Development Office |
| Satvir Kaur | Parliamentary Private Secretary to the Cabinet Office (non-ministerial role) | Parliamentary Secretary in the Cabinet Office |
| Josh Simons | Parliamentary Private Secretary to the Ministry of Justice (non-ministerial role) | Parliamentary Secretary in the Cabinet Office |
| Josh MacAlister | Parliamentary Private Secretary to the Cabinet Office (non-ministerial role) | Parliamentary Under-Secretary of State (Minister for Children and Families) at the Department for Education |
| Olivia Bailey | Parliamentary Private Secretary to the Department for Work and Pensions (non-ministerial role) | Parliamentary Under-Secretary of State (Minister for Early Education) at the Department for Education, Parliamentary Under-Secretary of State (Minister for Equalities) at the Department for Education |
| Blair McDougall | Backbench MP | Parliamentary Under-Secretary of State (Minister for Small Business and Economic Transformation) at the Department for Business and Trade |
| Kate Dearden | Assistant Government Whip | Parliamentary Under-Secretary of State (Minister for Employment Rights and Consumer Protection) at the Department for Business and Trade |
| Kanishka Narayan | Parliamentary Private Secretary to the Department for Environment, Food and Rural Affairs (non-ministerial role) | Parliamentary Under-Secretary of State (Minister for AI and Online Safety) at the Department for Science, Innovation and Technology |
| Anna McMorrin | Assistant Government Whip | Parliamentary Under-Secretary of State at the Wales Office |
| Matthew Patrick | Parliamentary Private Secretary to the Department for Culture, Media and Sport and the Department for Science, Innovation and Technology (non-ministerial role) | Parliamentary Under-Secretary of State at the Northern Ireland Office |
| Katie White | Parliamentary Private Secretary to the Department for Energy Security and Net Zero (non-ministerial role) | Parliamentary Under-Secretary of State (Minister for Climate) at the Department for Energy Security and Net Zero |
| Janet Daby | Parliamentary Under-Secretary of State for Children and Families | Left government |
| The Baroness Jones of Whitchurch | Parliamentary Under-Secretary of State for the Future Digital Economy and Online Safety | Left government |
| Gareth Thomas | Parliamentary Under-Secretary of State for Services, Small Business and Exports | Left government |
| Feryal Clark | Parliamentary Under-Secretary of State for AI and Digital Government | Left government |
| Fleur Anderson | Parliamentary Under-Secretary of State for Northern Ireland | Left government |
| Nia Griffith | Parliamentary Under-Secretary of State for Wales, Parliamentary Under-Secretary of State for Equalities | Left government |
| Gerald Jones | Assistant Government Whip | Left government |
| Martin McCluskey | Assistant Government Whip | Parliamentary Under-Secretary of State (Minister for Energy Consumers) at the Department for Energy Security and Net Zero |
| Keir Mather | Assistant Government Whip | Parliamentary Under-Secretary of State (Minister for Aviation, Maritime and Decarbonisation) at the Department for Transport |
| Jake Richards | Backbench MP | Parliamentary Under-Secretary of State at the Ministry of Justice, Assistant Whip, House of Commons |
| Lilian Greenwood | Parliamentary Under-Secretary of State for Future of Roads | Parliamentary Under-Secretary of State (Minister for Local Transport) at the Department for Transport, Junior Lord of the Treasury (Government Whip) |
| Nesil Caliskan | Backbench MP | Comptroller of HM Household (Government Whip) |
| Nic Dakin | Parliamentary Under-Secretary of State at the Ministry of Justice, Junior Lord of the Treasury (Government Whip) | Vice Chamberlain of HM Household (Government Whip) |
| Christian Wakeford | Assistant Government Whip | Junior Lord of the Treasury (Government Whip) |
| Stephen Morgan | Parliamentary Under-Secretary of State for Early Education | Junior Lord of the Treasury (Government Whip) |
| Claire Hughes | Parliamentary Private Secretary to the Department for Business and Trade (non-ministerial role) | Parliamentary Under-Secretary of State at the Wales Office, Assistant Whip, House of Commons |
| Mark Ferguson | Parliamentary Private Secretary to the Ministry of Housing, Communities and Local Government (non-ministerial role) | Assistant Whip, House of Commons |
| Gregor Poynton | Backbench MP | Assistant Whip, House of Commons |
| Imogen Walker | Parliamentary Private Secretary to HM Treasury (non-ministerial role) | Assistant Whip, House of Commons |
| Jade Botterill | Parliamentary Private Secretary to the Home Office (non-ministerial role) | Assistant Whip, House of Commons |
| Deirdre Costigan | Parliamentary Private Secretary to the Department of Health and Social Care (non-ministerial role) | Assistant Whip, House of Commons |
| The Lord Collins of Highbury | Deputy Leader of the House of Lords, Parliamentary Under-Secretary of State for Africa, Lord-in-Waiting (Government Whip) | Deputy Leader of the House of Lords, Lord-in-Waiting (Government Whip) |
| Mike Kane | Parliamentary Under-Secretary of State for Aviation, Maritime and Security | Left government |
| Kerry McCarthy | Parliamentary Under-Secretary of State for Climate | Left government |
| Jeff Smith | Junior Lord of the Treasury (Government Whip) | Left government |
| Liz Lloyd | None | Parliamentary Under-Secretary of State (Minister for Digital Economy at the Department for Business and Trade and the Department for Science, Innovation and Technology, Baroness in Waiting (Government Whip) |
| Chris McDonald | Parliamentary Private Secretary to the Department for Energy Security and Net Zero (non-ministerial role) | Parliamentary Under-Secretary of State (Minister for Industry) at the Department for Business and Trade and the Department for Energy Security and Net Zero |
| Gen Kitchen | Assistant Government Whip | Junior Lord of the Treasury (Government Whip) |

=== PPSs ===
The following newly appointed Parliamentary Private Secretaries (PPSs) were announced on 11 September 2025:

| Name | Position before reshuffle | Position after reshuffle |
|---|---|---|
| Catherine Fookes | | Parliamentary Private Secretary to the Prime Minister |
| Abena Oppong-Asare | Parliamentary Secretary in the Cabinet Office | Parliamentary Private Secretary to the Prime Minister |
| Jon Pearce | | Parliamentary Private Secretary to the Prime Minister |
| Claire Hazelgrove | Parliamentary Private Secretary to HM Treasury | Parliamentary Private Secretary to the Cabinet Office |
| Naushabah Khan | | Parliamentary Private Secretary to the Cabinet Office |
| Alice Macdonald | | Parliamentary Private Secretary to the Cabinet Office |
| Luke Charters | | Parliamentary Private Secretary to the Department for Business and Trade |
| Jeevun Sandher | | Parliamentary Private Secretary to the Department for Business and Trade |
| Marie Tidball | | Parliamentary Private Secretary to the Department for Business and Trade |
| Jack Abbott | Parliamentary Private Secretary to the Leader of the House of Lords and Lord Privy Seal | Parliamentary Private Secretary to the Department for Culture, Media and Sport |
| Lola McEvoy | | Parliamentary Private Secretary to the Department for Culture, Media and Sport |
| Shaun Davies | | Parliamentary Private Secretary to the Ministry of Defence |
| Amanda Martin | | Parliamentary Private Secretary to the Department for Education |
| Anna Gelderd | | Parliamentary Private Secretary to the Department for Energy Security and Net Zero |
| Connor Rand | | Parliamentary Private Secretary to the Department for Energy Security and Net Zero |
| Andrew Pakes | | Parliamentary Private Secretary to the Department for Environment, Food and Rural Affairs |
| Tom Rutland | | Parliamentary Private Secretary to the Department for Environment, Food and Rural Affairs |
| Catherine Atkinson | | Parliamentary Private Secretary to the Foreign, Commonwealth and Development Office |
| Steve Race | | Parliamentary Private Secretary to the Department of Health and Social Care |
| Rosie Wrighting | | Parliamentary Private Secretary to the Department of Health and Social Care |
| Sarah Coombes | Parliamentary Private Secretary to the Leader of the House of Commons and Lord President of the Council | Parliamentary Private Secretary to the Home Office |
| Alan Gemmell | Parliamentary Private Secretary to the Foreign, Commonwealth and Development Office | Parliamentary Private Secretary to the Home Office |
| Sally Jameson | Parliamentary Private Secretary to the Ministry of Justice | Parliamentary Private Secretary to the Home Office |
| Tom Hayes | | Parliamentary Private Secretary to the Ministry of Housing, Communities and Local Government |
| Laura Kyrke-Smith | Parliamentary Private Secretary to the Department for Environment, Food and Rural Affairs | Parliamentary Private Secretary to the Ministry of Housing, Communities and Local Government |
| James Frith | | Parliamentary Private Secretary to the Ministry of Justice |
| Joe Powell | | Parliamentary Private Secretary to the Ministry of Justice |
| Melanie Ward | Parliamentary Private Secretary to the Scotland Office | Parliamentary Private Secretary to the Ministry of Justice |
| Preet Kaur Gill | Parliamentary Private Secretary to the Department for Business and Trade | Parliamentary Private Secretary to the Department for Science, Innovation and Technology |
| Frank McNally | | Parliamentary Private Secretary to the Scotland Office |
| Alison Taylor | | Parliamentary Private Secretary to the Scotland Office |
| Helena Dollimore | | Parliamentary Private Secretary to HM Treasury |
| Kirith Entwistle | | Parliamentary Private Secretary to HM Treasury |
| Natalie Fleet | | Parliamentary Private Secretary to the Department for Work and Pensions |
| Leigh Ingham | | Parliamentary Private Secretary to the Leader of the House of Commons and Lord President of the Council |
| Paul Waugh | | Parliamentary Private Secretary to the Leader of the House of Lords and Lord Privy Seal |

== Analysis ==
The initial "mini-reshuffle" on 1 September was described as a "reset", with Keir Starmer referring to it as the "second phase" of his government and not a reshuffle.

=== Resignation of Angela Rayner ===
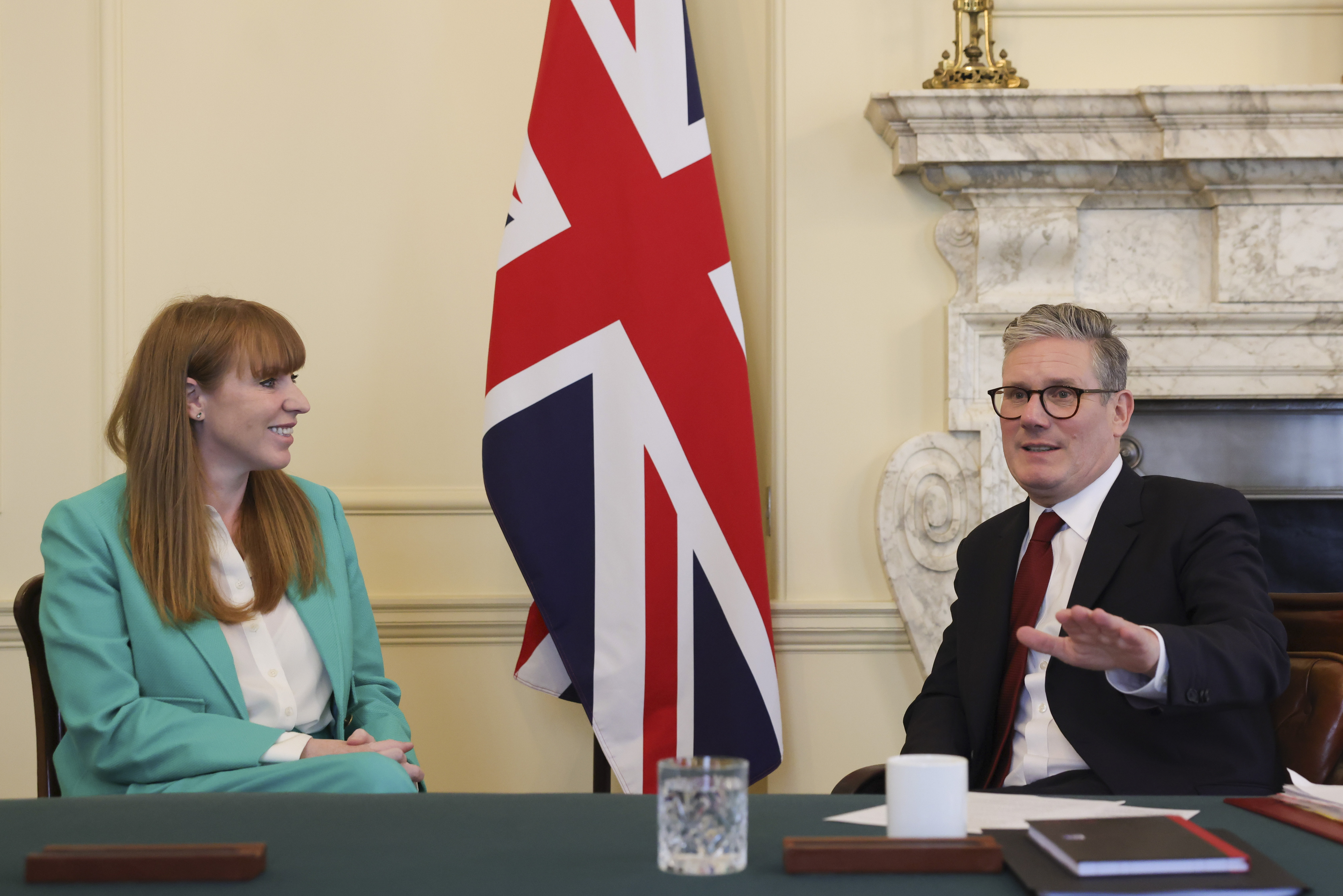
Rayner (left) and Starmer (right) during their first cabinet meeting on 5 July 2024.

The resignation of Angela Rayner was the catalyst for the reshuffle. She resigned over a tax scandal involving the purchase of a property. HuffPost wrote that Starmer sought to reassert his authority following the loss of Rayner. She had been expected to be a major candidate for Labour leader. Her concurrent resignation as Deputy Leader of the Labour Party also triggered a deputy leadership election. The last time a deputy leadership election was held alone was 2007.

The New Statesman noted the right-wing shift of the announced changes. One factor criticised was the treatment of female ministers.

=== Other changes ===
The reshuffle installed two new holders of Great Offices of State: a new home secretary and a new foreign secretary. This resulted in the three Great Offices below the Prime Minister being simultaneously occupied by women for the first time. Ministers who stayed in office included Secretary of State for Energy Security and Net Zero Ed Miliband.

Shabana Mahmood moved from Secretary of State for Justice to Home Secretary. She was noted for being the first female Muslim Home Secretary. Lucy Powell was dismissed as Leader of the House of Commons. This was significant as she was responsible for delivering the legislative programme through parliament. The Home Office saw major changes with Yvette Cooper, Angela Eagle and Diana Johnson leaving the department.

The removal of Ian Murray as Secretary of State for Scotland was a surprise. He spoke publicly of his huge disappointment. Lord George Foulkes called it a “disgraceful decision”. Murray was replaced by Douglas Alexander who previously served in the same job from 2006 to 2007 in the Blair government. The following day Murray returned to government but as a junior minister at the Department for Culture, Media and Sport.

A few senior female MPs left the government including Nia Griffith, Catherine McKinnell and Maria Eagle. A number of MPs first elected in the 2024 general election were appointed to the frontbench for the first time.

== Reactions ==
The reshuffle was controversial within Labour ranks. Chi Onwurah said: "It is clear that there are higher standards and expectations and more attention on working class Labour ministers, especially women.. but we have set ourselves high standards and we do need to keep to them”. Louise Haigh previously said northern female MPs were targeted for scrutiny. Internal civil war has been reported inside the Labour Party. As Rayner came from the soft left, the ideological split has been important.

The Daily Telegraph said that the government hoped the reshuffle would help counter Reform UK. Nigel Farage was the focus of media attention as the reshuffle happened on the same day as the Reform UK conference in Birmingham. Richard Tice said the government was "playing games". Many journalists who planned to travel for the weekend ended up staying in London after Angela Rayner's unexpected resignation. The reshuffle greatly overshadowed the Reform UK conference. Labour had been trailing in the polls and so this was given significance. Another reported issue for the government is on the left wing of politics with the new leader of the Green Party of England and Wales Zack Polanski, who was elected on 2 September, as well as the new Your Party of Jeremy Corbyn.

Leader of the Opposition and Leader of the Conservative Party Kemi Badenoch said: "Angela Rayner is finally gone.. but it's only because of Keir Starmer's weakness that she wasn't sacked three days ago". Leader of the Liberal Democrats Ed Davey said: "If Labour believes that having a reshuffle will solve the deep-rooted problems of this government, they are learning the wrong lessons from the calamity Conservatives before them".

== See also ==
- November 2021 British shadow cabinet reshuffle
- May 2021 British shadow cabinet reshuffle
- 2023 British shadow cabinet reshuffle
- 2025 British shadow cabinet reshuffle
