= Matt Doyle =

Matt Doyle or Matthew Doyle may refer to:

- Matt Doyle (actor) (born 1987), American stage and film actor
- Matt Doyle (tennis) (1954/5–2025), American and later Irish tour tennis player
- Matthew Doyle, Baron Doyle (born 1975), British political adviser and aide
