= Downing Street Director of Communications =

British government official

- Royal Arms as used by His Majesty's Government
- Incumbent; Sarah Brown since 20 July 2026
- Prime Minister's Office
- Appointer: Prime Minister
- Formation: 2000
- First holder: Alastair Campbell
- Website: www.number10.gov.uk

The Downing Street Director of Communications is the post of director of communications for the prime minister of the United Kingdom. The position is held by an appointed special adviser.

In September 2022, as part of the incoming Truss ministry, the role was sub-divided into a political and non-political remit, with Adam Jones becoming the political director of communications and Simon McGee the director of government communications. The role sub-division was abolished during the Sunak ministry, however, following the resignation of Matthew Doyle, the Starmer ministry re-established the dual office.

== History ==
The position of Downing Street Director of Communications was created in 2000. The first holder of the position was Alastair Campbell who had previously served as the Downing Street press secretary and as the prime minister's official spokesperson. The position initially held the power to issue orders to civil servants, but this authority was removed after Campbell's departure in 2003.

The post was temporarily vacant from April to July 2017 following the resignation of the former director of communications, Katie Perrior.

== List of directors of communications ==
#	Communications Director	Years	Prime Minister
1	Alastair Campbell	2000–2003	Tony Blair
2	David Hill	2003–2007	Tony Blair
3	Michael Ellam	2007–2009	Gordon Brown
4	Simon Lewis	2009–2010	Gordon Brown
5	Andy Coulson	2010–2011	David Cameron
6	Craig Oliver	2011–2016	David Cameron
7	Katie Perrior	2016–2017	Theresa May
8	Robbie Gibb	2017–2019	Theresa May
9	Lee Cain	2019–2020	Boris Johnson
10	James Slack	2021	Boris Johnson
11	Jack Doyle	2021–2022	Boris Johnson
12	Guto Harri	2022	Boris Johnson
13	Adam Jones (political), Simon McGee (government)	2022	Liz Truss
14	Amber De Botton	2022–2023	Rishi Sunak
15	Nerissa Chesterfield	2023–2024	Rishi Sunak
16	Matthew Doyle	2024–2025	Keir Starmer
17	James Lyons (strategy), Steph Driver (delivery)	2025	Keir Starmer
18	Tim Allan	2025–2026	Keir Starmer
19	Sarah Brown	2026–present	Andy Burnham

== In popular culture ==
In television series The Thick of It, the Downing Street director of communications was portrayed by actor Peter Capaldi playing the now infamous Malcolm Tucker. Former special advisors (spads) and civil servants were called upon to make the series as close-to-reality as possible. In 2009, Capaldi stated "Malcolm Tucker is Alastair Campbell. But Mandelson is there, too." He has also stated Harvey Weinstein as an influence.

== See also ==
- Downing Street Press Secretary
