= Steph Driver =

British special adviser

Downing Street Director of Communications
- In office 28 March 2025 – 25 September 2025
- Prime Minister: Keir Starmer
- Preceded by: Matthew Doyle
- Succeeded by: Tim Allan

Stephanie Michelle Driver is a British, former special political advisor. She served as Downing Street Director of Communications in the Starmer ministry.

== Biography ==
Driver was a long-serving aide. She previously worked at the Fabian Society. Driver was the Labour candidate for Corsham Pickwick ward at the 2021 Wiltshire Council election, but came in third place behind Liberal Democrat Helen Belcher.

Driver worked for the Speaker of the House of Commons Lindsay Hoyle before joining Starmer's office in 2021. She was brought in following the May 2021 British shadow cabinet reshuffle. She served as press secretary when he was Leader of the Opposition.

After the 2024 United Kingdom general election, she was appointed deputy communications director. In March 2025, she replaced Matthew Doyle as Downing Street Director of Communications. She resigned on 25 September 2025. On 5 July 2026, she appeared on the BBC One show Sunday with Laura Kuenssberg.
