= Secretary of State for Justice =

Member of the Cabinet of the United Kingdom

- Royal Arms of His Majesty's Government

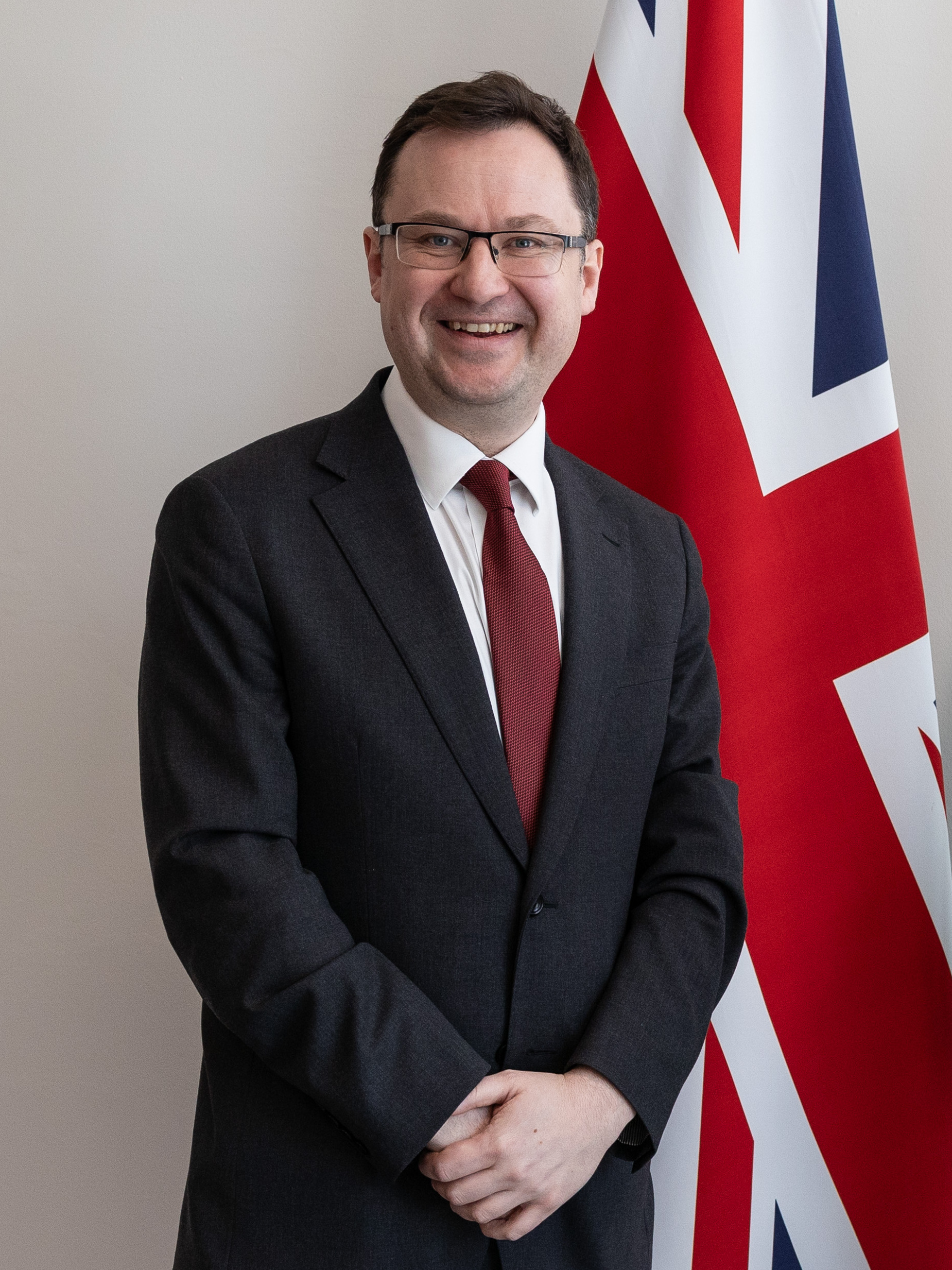
- Incumbent; Alex Norris since 20 July 2026
- Ministry of Justice
- Style: Justice Secretary (informal); The Right Honourable (within the UK and Commonwealth)
- Type: Minister of the Crown
- Status: Secretary of State
- Member of: Cabinet; Privy Council
- Reports to: The Prime Minister
- Seat: Westminster
- Nominator: The Prime Minister
- Appointer: The Monarch; (on the advice of the Prime Minister)
- Term length: At His Majesty's pleasure
- Precursor: Secretary of State for Constitutional Affairs
- Formation: 9 May 2007
- First holder: Charles Falconer, Baron Falconer of Thoroton
- Salary: £159,038 per annum (2022) (including £86,584 MP salary)
- Website: Official Website

- Applies to: England and Wales; United Kingdom (some reserved matters)

Other UK counterparts
- Northern Ireland: Minister of Justice
- Scotland: Cabinet Secretary for Justice and Home Affairs

The secretary of state for justice is a secretary of state in the Government of the United Kingdom, with responsibility for the Ministry of Justice. The incumbent is a member of the Cabinet of the United Kingdom. Since the office's inception in 2007, the incumbent has concurrently been appointed Lord Chancellor.

The officeholder works alongside the other justice ministers. The corresponding shadow minister is the shadow secretary of state for justice. The performance of the secretary of state and his department is also scrutinised by the Justice Select Committee.

== Responsibilities ==
Corresponding to what is generally known as a justice minister in many other countries, the justice secretary's remit encompasses justice policy for the whole United Kingdom along with matters of justice specific to England and Wales.

The justice secretary is responsible throughout the UK for:

- Human rights and civil liberties;
- Miscarriages of justice (via the Criminal Cases Review Commission); and
- The UK’s relations with the governments of the three Crown Dependencies - Guernsey, Jersey, and the Isle of Man.

In relation to England and Wales, the justice secretary's portfolio concerns the following matters:

- The delivery of criminal justice generally, including criminal law, criminal procedure, sentencing, probation and parole, criminal injury compensation, and victim's rights;
- All matters falling under civil justice, including but not limited to civil procedure, administrative law, bankruptcy and insolvency law, commercial law, contract law, family law, probate, and tort; and
- Administration of the Children and Family Court Advisory and Support Service, His Majesty's Prison and Probation Service, the Parole Board, the Prisons and Probation Ombudsman, the Victims' Commissioner, and the Youth Justice Board.

== Creation ==
The then lord chancellor, Lord Falconer of Thoroton, was appointed to the post of Secretary of State for Justice when it was created in 2007. The office of Secretary of State for Constitutional Affairs was abolished, along with the Department for Constitutional Affairs. The home secretary, John Reid, told Parliament that future secretaries of state for justice would be MPs rather than peers.

== List of secretaries of state ==
Secretary of State	Term of office		Political party	Government
Charles Falconer, Baron Falconer of Thoroton	9 May 2007	28 June 2007	Labour	Blair (III)
Jack Straw (Note: First non-peer to serve as Lord Chancellor since Sir Robert Henley as Lord Keeper of the Seal in 1760.); MP for Blackburn	28 June 2007	6 May 2010	Labour	Brown
Kenneth Clarke; MP for Rushcliffe	12 May 2010	6 September 2012	Conservative	Cameron-Clegg (Coalition)
Chris Grayling; MP for Epsom and Ewell	6 September 2012	8 May 2015	Conservative	Cameron-Clegg (Coalition)
Michael Gove; MP for Surrey Heath	8 May 2015	14 July 2016	Conservative	Cameron (II)
Liz Truss; MP for South West Norfolk	14 July 2016	11 June 2017	Conservative	May (I)
David Lidington; MP for Aylesbury	11 June 2017	8 January 2018	Conservative	May (II)
David Gauke; MP for South West Hertfordshire	8 January 2018	24 July 2019	Conservative	May (II)
Robert Buckland; MP for South Swindon	24 July 2019	15 September 2021	Conservative	Johnson (I)
Robert Buckland; MP for South Swindon	24 July 2019	15 September 2021	Conservative	Johnson (II)
Dominic Raab; MP for Esher and Walton	15 September 2021	6 September 2022	Conservative	Johnson (II)
Brandon Lewis; MP for Great Yarmouth	6 September 2022	25 October 2022	Conservative	Truss
Dominic Raab; MP for Esher and Walton	25 October 2022	21 April 2023	Conservative	Sunak
Alex Chalk; MP for Cheltenham	21 April 2023	5 July 2024	Conservative	Sunak
Shabana Mahmood; MP for Birmingham Ladywood	5 July 2024	5 September 2025	Labour	Starmer
David Lammy; MP for Tottenham	5 September 2025	20 July 2026	Labour	Starmer
Alex Norris; MP for Nottingham North and Kimberley	20 July 2026	Incumbent	Labour	Burnham

== See also ==
- Constitutional Reform Act 2005
- Lord Chancellor
