= Amber de Botton =

British political aide and journalist

Downing Street Director of Communications
- In office 29 October 2022 – 1 September 2023
- Prime Minister: Rishi Sunak
- Preceded by: Adam Jones (political); Simon McGee (government)
- Succeeded by: Nerissa Chesterfield

Personal details
- Born: c. 1985
- Spouse: Oli de Botton
- Education: University of Durham

Amber de Botton (née Elliott; born 1985/86) is a British journalist and former political aide. She served as the Downing Street Director of Communications from October 2022 until September 2023, succeeding Guto Harri.

== Journalism career ==
She graduated from Durham University in 2007 with a degree in History and Politics. At university she was co-editor of Palatinate. She then embarked on a media career and was Deputy Head of Politics at Sky News for five years until 2017. She subsequently worked at ITV News as Head of Politics and subsequently Head of UK News. In her role as ITV News's Home News Editor, she oversaw breaking news of the Partygate scandal in December 2021, when video emerged of Allegra Stratton, the Downing Street Press Secretary, joking about a party that had been held at 10 Downing Street during the COVID-19 lockdown.

In June 2024, she was announced as chief communications officer for the Guardian Media Group.

== Downing Street Director of Communications ==
Prior to her appointment as Downing Street Director of Communications, de Botton was approached on at least three previous occasions with job offers in government, but had declined them. In 2010 she was offered a role with the Treasury under then Chancellor of the Exchequer George Osborne, and later received two offers of roles in the Johnson government, first as deputy to Director of Communications Lee Cain, and later as Press Secretary, fronting daily press conferences during the COVID-19 pandemic.

Following Rishi Sunak's election as leader of the Conservative Party and his subsequent appointment as Prime Minister, de Botton was appointed as the new Downing Street Director of Communications on 29 October 2022. During her tenure at Downing Street, de Botton kept a lower profile than some of her predecessors, with the Politico website suggestion she had "restored professionalism to the Downing Street operation" following the turbulence of Partygate. One of her first actions was to scrap the long-established morning ministerial broadcast round, whereby a government minister would appear on morning news programmes, replacing it instead with twice-weekly appearances, designed to coincide with important announcements from the government. She stood down from the post on 1 September 2023, saying she had "decided it is the right time to move on". She was succeeded in the role by Sunak's Press Secretary, Nerissa Chesterfield.

== Personal life ==
She is married to Oli de Botton, who stood as the Labour Party candidate in Hitchin and Harpenden at the 2010 general election. Also in 2010, he worked on David Miliband's unsuccessful campaign to become Labour Party leader, and later co-founded a free school with Peter Hyman, a former strategist who worked for Tony Blair during his time as prime minister. She is Jewish.
