= Adam Jones (political adviser) =

British special adviser

Downing Street Director of Communications
- In office 6 September 2022 – 25 October 2022 Serving with Simon McGee
- Preceded by: Guto Harri
- Succeeded by: Amber de Botton

Personal details
- Party: Conservative

Adam Jones is a British political adviser. He was a special adviser to the former British Prime Minister Liz Truss.

== Career ==
Adam Jones previously worked as a speech writer at HSBC. Jones joined the government in 2020 as a special adviser at the Department for International Trade. He served as director of communications when she was Secretary of State for International Trade. He moved to the Foreign Office as communications director under Liz Truss. He was a media adviser when she was Foreign Secretary. When she was elected Prime Minister he was appointed to the Truss ministry as head of political communications in the Prime Minister's Office. When she resigned he left Downing Street and was replaced by Amber de Botton.
