= Nerissa Chesterfield =

British public relations officer

Nerissa Chesterfield CBE

Downing Street Director of Communications
- In office 1 September 2023 – 5 July 2024
- Prime Minister: Rishi Sunak
- Preceded by: Amber de Botton
- Succeeded by: Matthew Doyle

Downing Street Press Secretary
- In office October 2022 – 1 September 2023
- Prime Minister: Rishi Sunak
- Preceded by: Alex Wild
- Succeeded by: Lucy Noakes

Nerissa Chesterfield CBE is a British political aide who served as Downing Street Director of Communications from September 2023 to July 2024. She previously served as Downing Street Press Secretary under Prime Minister Rishi Sunak from October 2022.

== Career ==
Chesterfield worked for Dominic Cummings at Vote Leave during the 2016 United Kingdom European Union membership referendum. In 2018 she became communications manager at the Institute for Economic Affairs. In 2019 she worked under Liz Truss at the Department for International Trade as a media special adviser. After working for Rishi Sunak as a media adviser, she was appointed Downing Street Press Secretary when he became prime minister in October 2022.

On 1 September 2023, she replaced Amber de Botton as Downing Street Director of Communications.
