= Chief Secretary to the Prime Minister =

Senior minister in the Cabinet Office

United Kingdom Chief Secretary to the Prime Minister
- Royal Arms of His Majesty's Government
- Prime Minister's Office; Cabinet Office
- Style: The Right Honourable
- Reports to: Prime Minister
- Nominator: Prime Minister
- Appointer: The Monarch (on the advice of the Prime Minister)
- Term length: At His Majesty's pleasure
- Formation: 1 September 2025
- First holder: Darren Jones
- Final holder: Darren Jones
- Abolished: 20 July 2026
- Website: gov.uk/government/ministers/minister-of-state--197

The Chief Secretary to the Prime Minister was a senior ministerial office in the British Government reporting directly to the Prime Minister as a part of the Prime Minister's Office within the Cabinet Office. Whilst initially, and briefly, also attending cabinet as a Minister of State, the office holder later became a full member of the Cabinet.

The office was created in 2025 by Prime Minister Keir Starmer to work across government departments and support policy delivery.

== History ==
The office was established as a part of the 2025 cabinet reshuffle under Keir Starmer's premiership.

Downing Street said that the new role would be in charge of 'driving forward progress' in key policy areas, and that the office would directly report to the Prime Minister. On 1 September 2025, Darren Jones was appointed as the first officeholder and it was announced that he would attend cabinet; a few days later he was additionally appointed to the offices of Chancellor of the Duchy of Lancaster and Minister for Intergovernmental Relations.

== List of chief secretaries to the Prime Minister ==
Chief Secretary to the Prime Minister
Labour
Chief secretary	Term of office		Party	Ministry	Prime Minister
Darren Jones; MP for Bristol North West	1 September 2025	20 July 2026	Labour	Starmer	Keir Starmer

== See also ==
- Chief Secretary to the Treasury
