= Director of communications =

Position in private and public sectors

Director of communications is a position in both the private and public sectors. A director of communications is responsible for managing and directing an organization's internal and external communications. Directors of communications supervise public relations staff, create communication strategies, and may serve as the key spokesperson and media contact for the organization.

A director of communications may also be called a public relations manager, communications director, or press secretary.

The director of communications usually reports directly to a CxO, including a chief communications officer (CCO) or chief executive officer (CEO) of a company or organization.

In an organization, the director of communications directs the Communications Department. The director of communications may be assisted by a deputy director, clerical staff, and communications specialists and managers.

== Communications in politics ==
=== United States ===
In United States politics, a director of communications is usually a senior aide to the president of the United States (White House Communications Director), a member of the House of Representatives, a senator, a judge, a candidate for political office, a Cabinet secretary, or a government department.

=== United Kingdom and Canada ===
In Canada and the United Kingdom, a director of communications is a senior aide to members of Parliament, members of the House of Lords, the prime minister, Cabinet ministers, and government departments. The director of communications to the prime minister of the United Kingdom is Matthew Doyle.

=== Philippines ===
In the Philippines, the director of communications usually falls to the Secretary of the Presidential Communications Office which is a member of the cabinet and attached solely to the president of the Philippines, responsible for communicating administration's messages and the executive branch of government. Current Secretary of the Presidential Communications Office is Jay Ruiz.

=== Australia ===
In Australia, the director of communications is a senior adviser to the prime minister. They manage the prime minister's communications office including press secretaries and speechwriting staff.

=== Nigeria ===
In Nigeria the director of communications or special adviser on communications is a senior aide to the president, vice-president, and senior members of the National Assembly.

=== Spain ===
In Spain, the most senior official responsible for the government communication policy is the Secretary of State for Press (or "for Communication").

The Secretary of State depends from the Prime Minister and the Government Spokesperson.

=== Council of Europe ===
In the Council of Europe, the director of communication plays a key role in the organization, directly supporting the work of the secretary general of the Council of Europe.
