= Nin Pandit =

British civil servant

Principal Private Secretary to the Prime Minister of the United Kingdom
- In office 6 October 2024 – 28 August 2025
- Prime Minister: Keir Starmer
- Preceded by: Elizabeth Perelman
- Succeeded by: Dan York-Smith

Ninjeri “Nin” Pandit is a British civil servant. She served as Principal Private Secretary to Prime Minister Keir Starmer from 2024 to 2025.

== Biography ==
Pandit was chief of staff and lead policy advisor to the chief executive of NHS England. She previously worked for the health improvement board of the Mayor of London.

She was director of the Number 10 Policy Unit. under Rishi Sunak. In October 2024, with the resignation of Sue Gray, she was promoted to Principal Private Secretary. On 28 August 2025, she resigned from the role. She became the third top aide to depart from the Starmer ministry in under a year.
