= Sean Woodcock =

British politician

Sean Woodcock MP
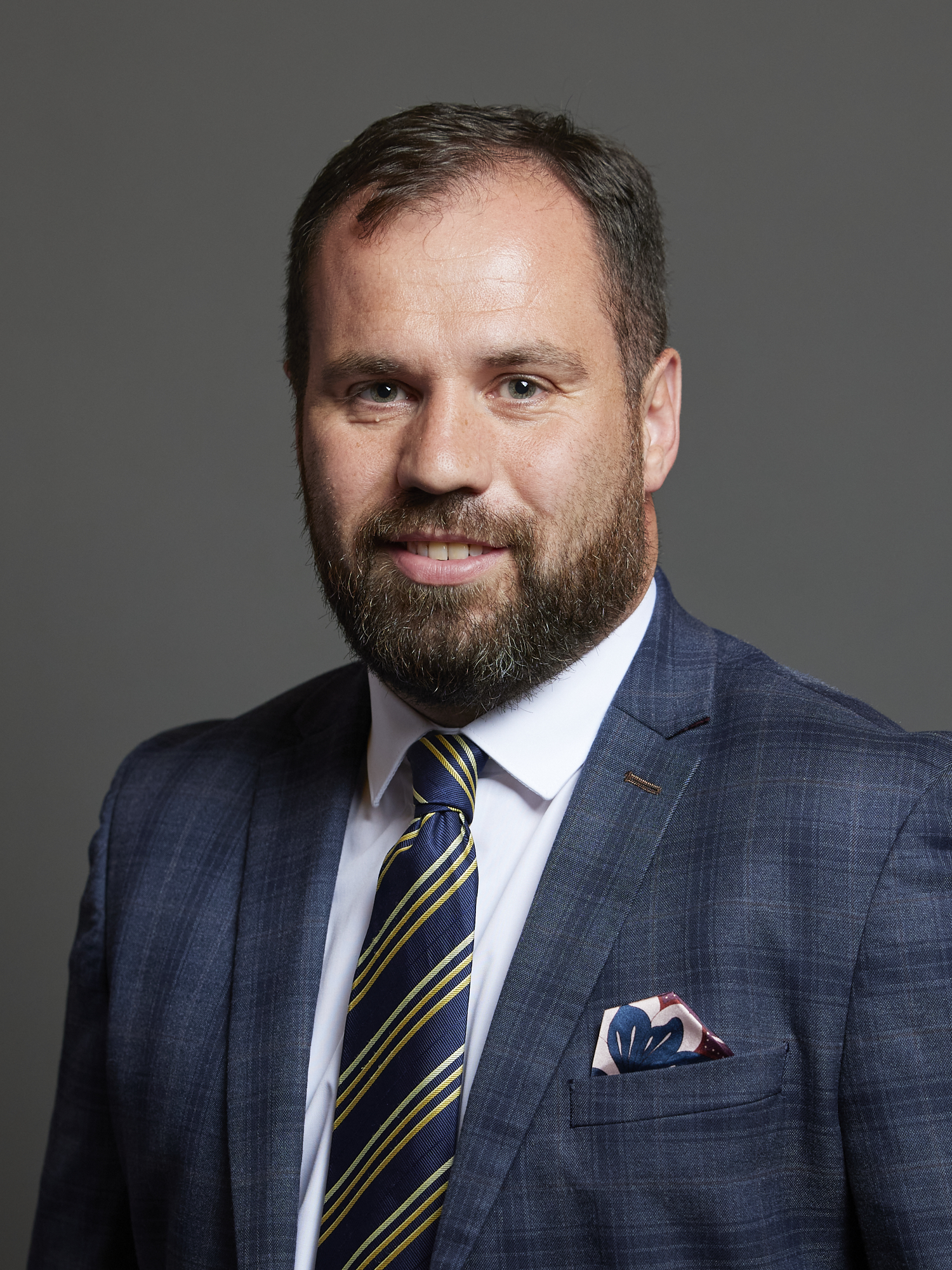
- Official portrait, 2024

Member of Parliament for Banbury
- Incumbent
- Assumed office 4 July 2024
- Preceded by: Victoria Prentis
- Majority: 3,256 (6.7%)

Member of Cherwell District Council
- In office 4 May 2023 – 15 March 2025
- Preceded by: Perran Moon
- Constituency: Banbury Grimsbury and Hightown
- In office 3 May 2012 – 4 May 2023
- Preceded by: Pat Tompson
- Succeeded by: Isabel Creed
- Constituency: Banbury Ruscote

Personal details
- Born: Sean Lee Woodcock; 25 April 1986 (age 40) Banbury, Oxfordshire, England
- Party: Labour
- Education: University of Reading (BA); University of Birmingham (MA)
- Website: Official website

Sean Lee Woodcock (born 25 April 1986) is a Labour politician who has served as Member of Parliament for Banbury since 2024.

== Early life and career ==
Woodcock was born at Horton General Hospital in Banbury. He is the eldest of five siblings. He attended Wroxton C of E Primary School, followed by The Warriner School. He received a Bachelor of Arts degree in History from Reading University, and a Master of Arts from Birmingham University.

Woodcock went on to work in social housing and community investment before becoming a councillor on Cherwell District and Banbury Town councils in May 2012. Following this, Woodcock became Mayor of Banbury from 2014 to 2015, becoming the youngest mayor on record. He was the Labour parliamentary candidate for Banbury in both the 2015 and 2017 general elections. He was the Labour candidate in Banbury Calthorpe ward at the 2021 Oxfordshire County Council election but was not elected.

== Parliamentary career ==
In December 2023, Woodcock was chosen as the Labour candidate for the Banbury constituency in the 2024 election. He gained the seat from incumbent Victoria Prentis, who had represented the constituency since 2015 for the Conservative Party and was serving as Attorney General for England and Wales at the time of her defeat. He is the first Labour MP to be elected in the constituency since its creation and first non-Conservative MP since 1922.

He made his maiden speech in the House of Commons on 17 October 2024. Woodcock opposed Kim Leadbeater's bill introducing assisted dying into law and served on the committee examining the legislation.

In May 2026, he replaced Naushabah Khan as Parliamentary Private Secretary to the Cabinet Office.

Parliament of the United Kingdom
Preceded by Victoria Prentis	Member of Parliament for Banbury; 2024–present	Incumbent
