= James Lyons (political adviser) =

British special adviser

Downing Street Director of Strategic Communications
- In office October 2024 – September 2025
- Prime Minister: Keir Starmer

Personal details
- Party: Labour

James Lyons is a British political aide and former journalist. He served as Downing Street Director of Strategic Communications in the Starmer ministry.

== Biography ==
Lyons previously worked as a journalist. He was deputy political editor at The Sunday Times. He also had the same role at the Daily Mirror. Lyons was Director of Communications at NHS England and NHS Improvement, and served in this position during the COVID-19 pandemic. He was also a communications adviser at TikTok.

Lyons joined the Prime Minister's Office following the resignation of Sue Gray. When Matthew Doyle resigned in March 2025, Lyons was appointed Director of Communications and was given responsibility for communications strategy. He resigned on 1 September 2025.
