= Parliamentary Private Secretary to the Cabinet Office =

Junior role in the British government

- Royal Arms of His Majesty's Government

- Incumbent; Sean Woodcock since May 2026
- Cabinet Office
- Nominator: Prime Minister of the United Kingdom
- Appointer: The Monarch; on advice of the Prime Minister
- Term length: At His Majesty's pleasure
- Salary: unpaid

The Parliamentary Private Secretary to the Cabinet Office is a Parliamentary Private Secretary that supports the Cabinet Office.

== List of officeholders ==
- Torsten Bell (2024 to 2025)
- Roberta Blackman-Woods (2006 to 2007)
- David Burrowes (2010 to 2012)
- Alan Campbell (2001 to 2003)
- Jeffrey Ennis (2007 to 2010)
- Nigel Evans (1994 to 1995)
- Derek Foster (1997 - in role for two days)
- Edward Garnier (1997)
- Peter Gibson (2022 to May 2024)
- Mary Hamilton (1929 to 1931)
- Kevin Hollinrake
- Jane Hunt (2020 to 2022)
- Satvir Kaur (2025)
- Barbara Keeley (8 February 2006 to June 2006)
- Ian Levy (2022)
- Josh MacAlister (2025)
- Pat McFadden
- Gillian Merron (June 2007 to January 2008)
- Damien Moore
- Margaret Moran
- James Morris
- David Mowat (2014 to 2015)
- Ian Pearson (1997 to 1998)
- Will Quince
- Lawrie Quinn
- Angela Smith
- Naushabah Khan (2025 to 2026)
- Mark Tami
- Tom Watson
- Angie Bray
- Kevin Foster
- Alice Macdonald (2025 to 2026)
- Sean Woodcock (2026)
