= Joe Powell (politician) =

British politician

Joseph Powell MP
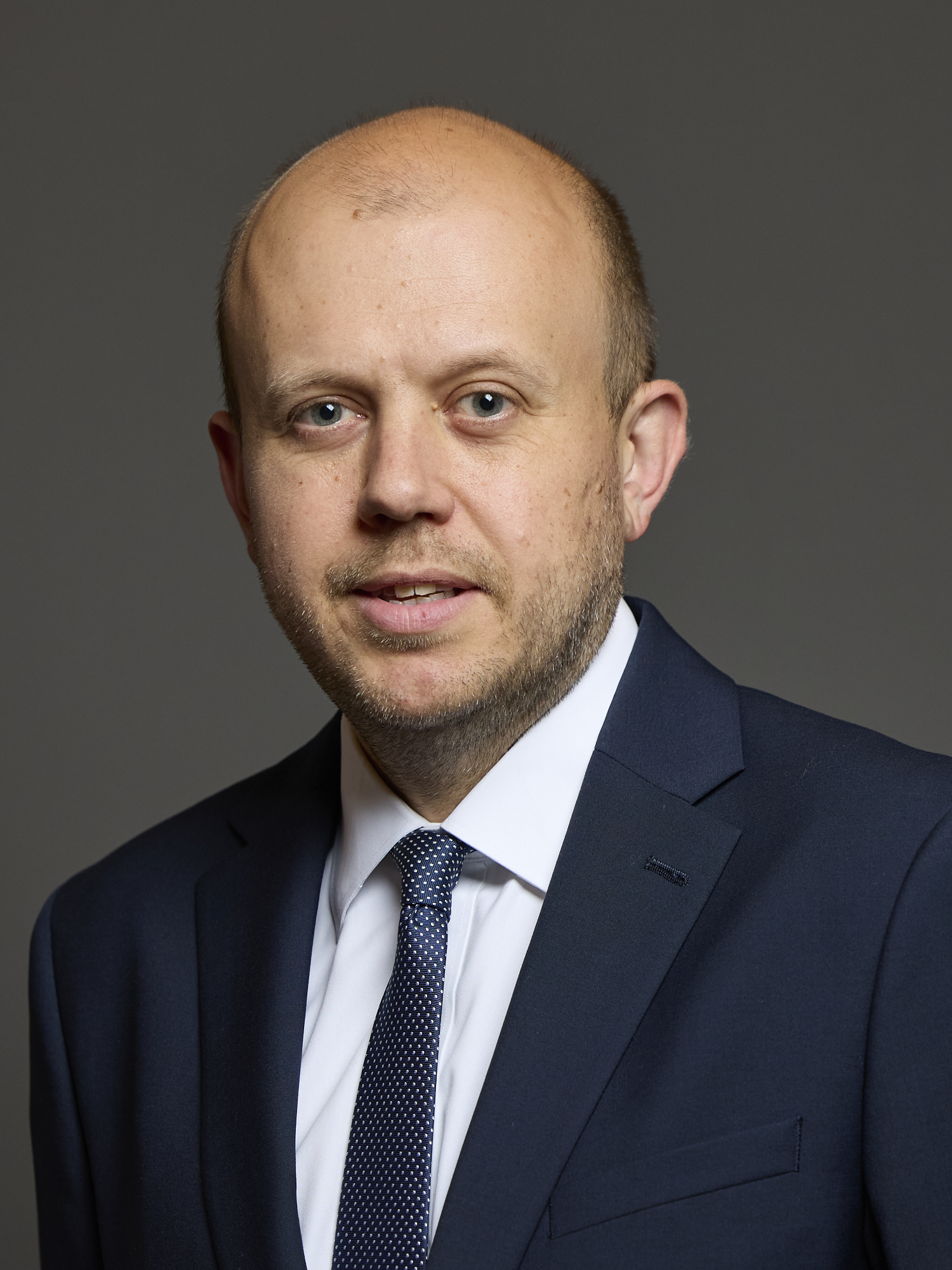
- Official portrait, 2024

Member of Parliament for Kensington and Bayswater
- Incumbent
- Assumed office 4 July 2024
- Preceded by: Felicity Buchan (Kensington)
- Majority: 2,903 (6.9%)

Personal details
- Party: Labour
- Education: University of Cambridge; Makerere University

Joseph Edward Powell is a British Labour Party politician who has served as the Member of Parliament (MP) for Kensington and Bayswater since 2024. He was the deputy CEO of the Open Government Partnership (OGP) for 11 years.

== Early life ==
Powell grew up in Queen's Park, London and was privately educated at University College School. He studied at St Catharine's College, Cambridge, from 2004 to 2007, graduating from the University of Cambridge with a bachelor's degree in geography. He then went on to attend Makerere University in Uganda for a further two years, receiving a master's degree in international relations and diplomatic studies in 2009.

== Career outside parliament ==
Powell was the deputy chief executive officer of the Open Government Partnership for 11 years.

In 2022, Powell was a co-founder of Kensington Against Dirty Money, an activist association. He was involved in a publicity stunt loading a washing machine with cash. He has regularly called for increased transparency about who owns and controls property in the United Kingdom, highlighting issues such as the fact that 6,000 properties in the Borough of Kensington and Chelsea are registered to anonymous companies.

== Parliamentary career ==
On 25 November 2022, Powell was selected by Kensington Labour to be the parliamentary candidate in the 2024 general election. Powell pledged to improve St. Mary's, Charing Cross and Hammersmith Hospitals; increase affordable housing and improve landlord regulations; enhance neighbourhood policing; address the cost of living crisis and climate change; seek justice for Grenfell; and tackle dirty money in the community.
