= Matthew Doyle, Baron Doyle =

British political aide and adviser (born 1975)

The Right Honourable The Lord Doyle
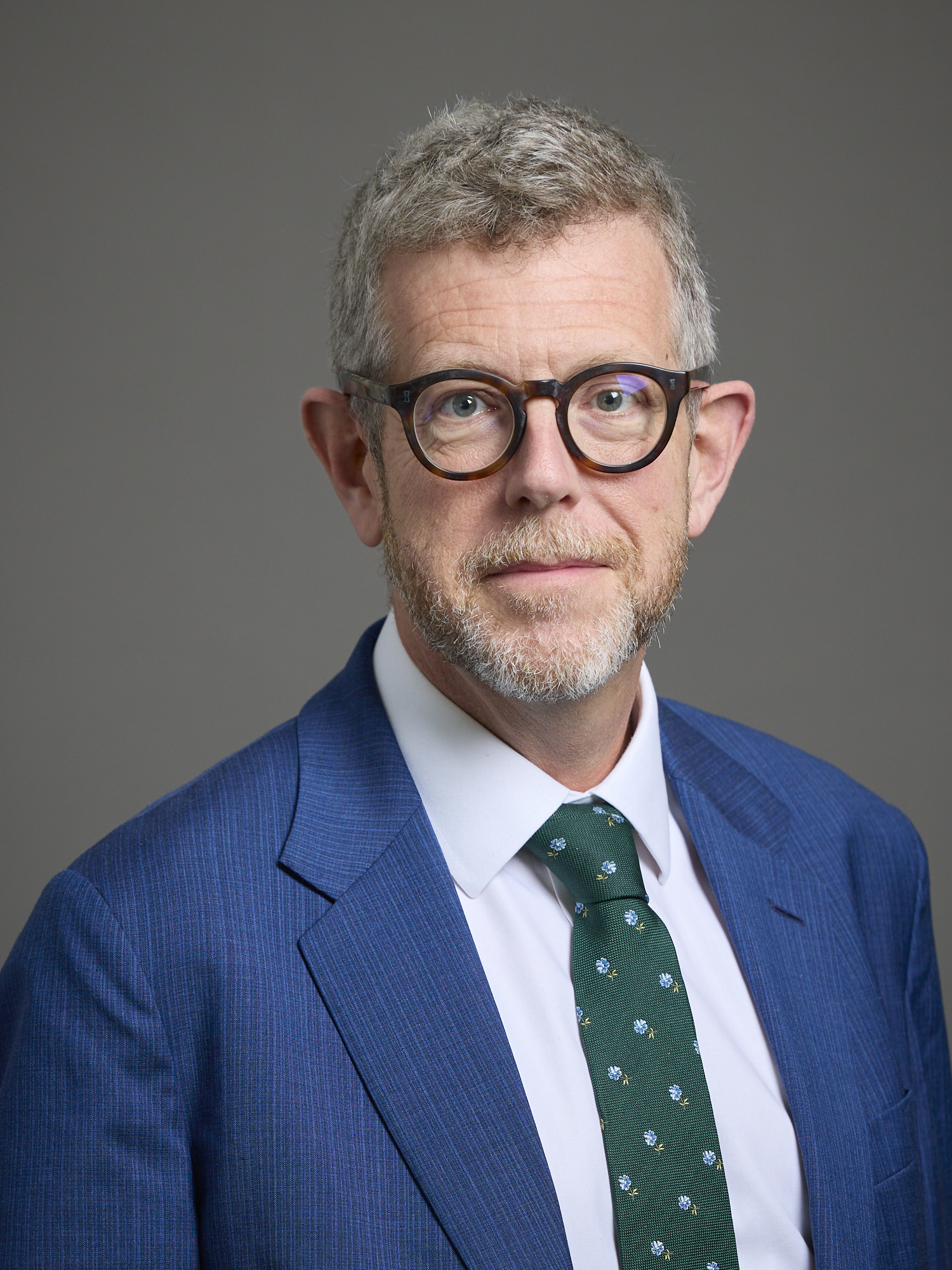
- Official portrait, 2026

Downing Street Director of Communications
- In office 5 July 2024 – 28 March 2025
- Prime Minister: Sir Keir Starmer
- Preceded by: Nerissa Chesterfield
- Succeeded by: James Lyons and Steph Driver

Member of the House of Lords
- Lord Temporal
- Life peerage 8 January 2026
Special adviser positions (2005–2007)
Special adviser to the Prime Minister of the United Kingdom
In office May 2005 – 27 June 2007
Prime Minister	Tony Blair
Special adviser to the Secretary of State for Work and Pensions
In office May 2005 – November 2005
Secretary	David Blunkett
Director of Communications for the Labour Party
In office June 2021 – March 2025
Leader	Keir Starmer

Personal details
- Born: Matthew Leo Doyle
- Party: Labour (Note: Suspended since 9 February 2026)

Matthew Leo Doyle, Baron Doyle, is a British political adviser, political aide and life peer who served as Downing Street Director of Communications from July 2024 to March 2025. Doyle was created life peer in January 2026, shortly before being suspended for his connection to a charged distributor of indecent images of children.

== Career ==
=== Under Blair and Brown (1998–2012) ===
Doyle was Head of Press and Broadcasting for the Labour Party between November 1998 and May 2005. He was then special adviser to Work and Pensions Secretary, David Blunkett, from May to November 2005, before working as a special adviser to Prime Minister Tony Blair from November 2005 to June 2007. He was the Downing Street Deputy Director of Communications under Blair. He departed Downing Street after Blair left office as Prime Minister, and went on to work as the Political Director of Blair's office from June 2007 to February 2012.

Doyle was also the TV Debates Media Director for Prime Minister Gordon Brown in the 2010 general election.

=== After Blair (2012–2021) ===
In 2012, he established his own political consultancy, MLD Advisory Ltd. He also spent two years as the European Director of Communications for the International Rescue Committee under former Foreign Secretary David Miliband.

Doyle led the press operation for Liz Kendall's campaign in the 2015 Labour leadership election.

=== Under Starmer (2021–2025) ===
Shortly after the Labour defeat in the 2021 Hartlepool by-election, Doyle was appointed the Labour Party Director of Communications on an interim basis under Leader Sir Keir Starmer, with the role later becoming permanent. After Labour's victory in the 2024 general election, Doyle was appointed Downing Street Director of Communications and stepped down from the role in March 2025. In April 2026, during evidence given by Olly Robbins at the Foreign Affairs Committee, it emerged that Downing Street considered giving Doyle a role as a diplomat.

=== House of Lords and suspension ===
Doyle was nominated by Starmer for a life peerage in December 2025 as part of the 2025 Political Peerages to sit in the House of Lords as a Labour peer; he was created Baron Doyle, of Great Barford in the County of Bedfordshire, on 8 January 2026. Just weeks later, Doyle was suspended by the party over his friendship with Sean Morton, who was charged in 2016 and convicted in 2018 for possessing indecent images of children. Doyle had campaigned with Morton for his re-election as an independent councillor in 2017. Morton was later jailed for a similar offence in January 2025. Doyle has since "apologised for his actions".

== Personal life ==
Lord Doyle is Roman Catholic.
