= Andrew Parsons (photographer) =

British photographer

- Born: September 1974
- Occupation: Photographer
- Website: andrewparsonsphotos.co.uk

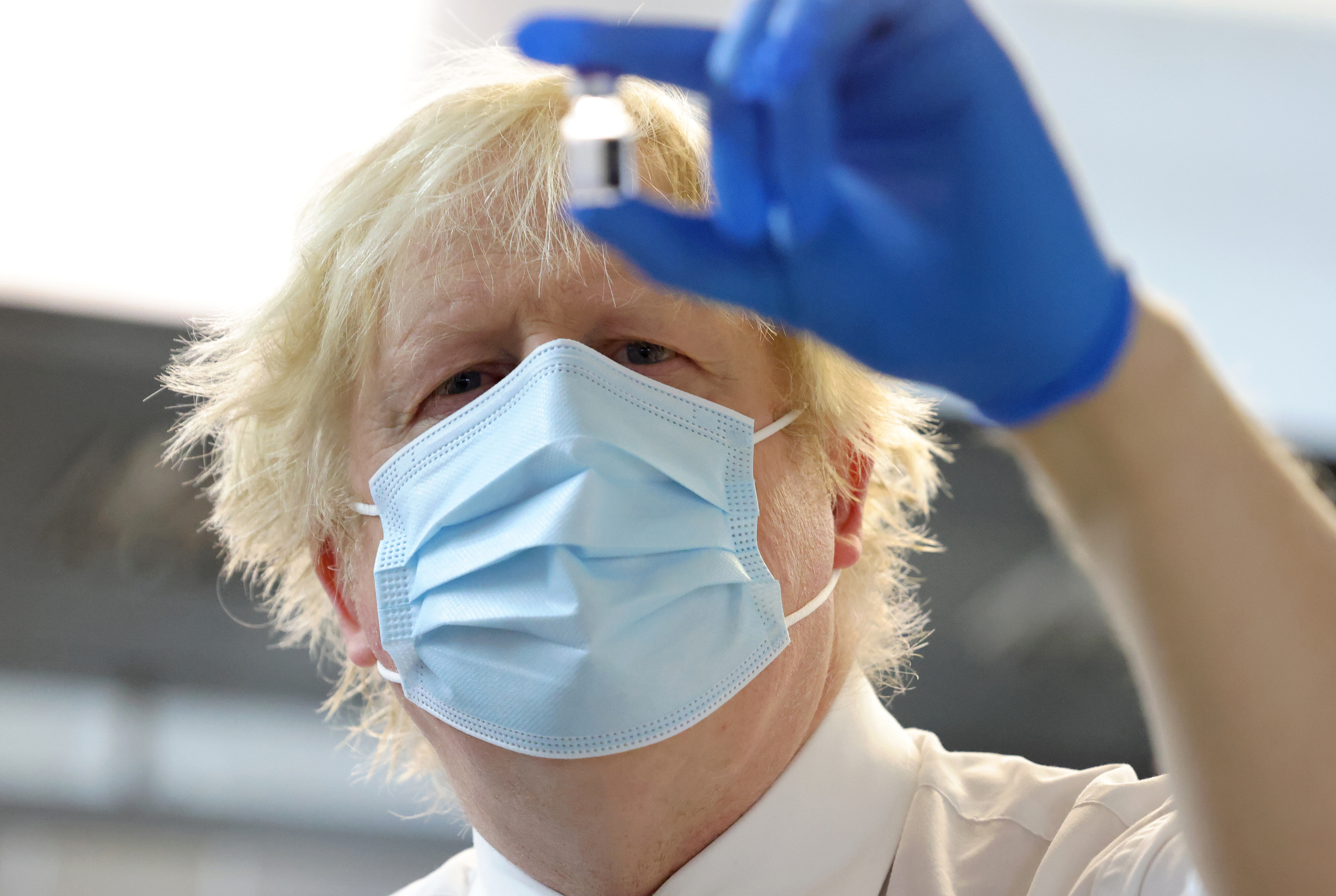
Parsons' photograph of then Prime Minister Boris Johnson visiting the Stowe medical clinic in West London, during the COVID-19 pandemic

Andrew Parsons is a British professional photographer who has worked with the Conservative Party and, as a civil servant, in close liaison with four of the five most recent Conservative prime ministers: David Cameron, Theresa May, Boris Johnson and Liz Truss.

== Career ==
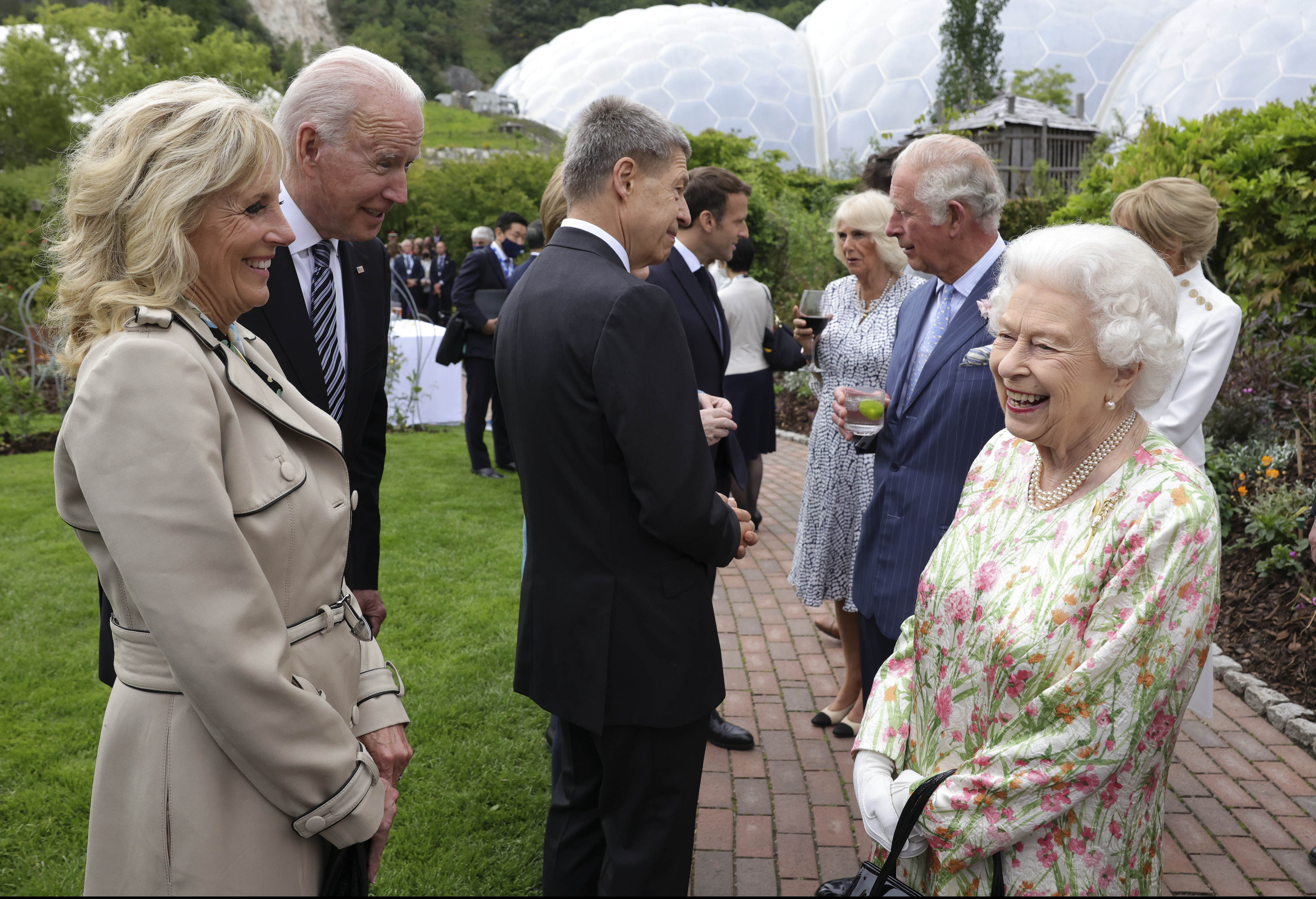
Parsons' photograph of Queen Elizabeth II talking to Jill Biden at the 2021 G7 Summit in Cornwall

After working at the Cambridge Evening News and The Times, Parsons became a Press Association (PA) photographer in 2001. During 2007 he was embedded with the 1st Battalion, the Worcestershire and Sherwood Foresters Regiment in Helmand province, Afghanistan, on behalf of the PA. He also covered conflicts in Iraq, Lebanon and Bosnia.

He was employed as an official photographer by the Conservative Party during the 2010 election campaign, for which his company Parsons Media received payments totalling £45,525.25. He was subsequently given a civil service role by David Cameron, but was released from that role after criticism, and was paid instead by the Conservative Party. His role continued under Theresa May.

He worked for Boris Johnson during the latter's tenure as Mayor of London, but was not employed by the Greater London Authority to do so. He also took photographs for Johnson at family events. As Prime Minister, Johnson reappointed Parsons to the civil service as a part-time special advisor, a political appointment, on a salary equivalent to £100,000 full time.

Images by Parsons of illegal parties at 10 Downing Street during COVID-19 lockdown were reported as being instrumental in Sue Gray's report and police investigations into the incidents, and have been required to be produced as evidence to the Commons Select Committee of Privileges as part of their inquiry into Boris Johnson dealings with the committee.

Many of Parsons' images taken in his role as a civil servant are available under the Open Government Licence.

He is co-founder of the photo agency i-Images, which he established in 2011 with Stephen Lock.

== Spaceport Cornwall image ==
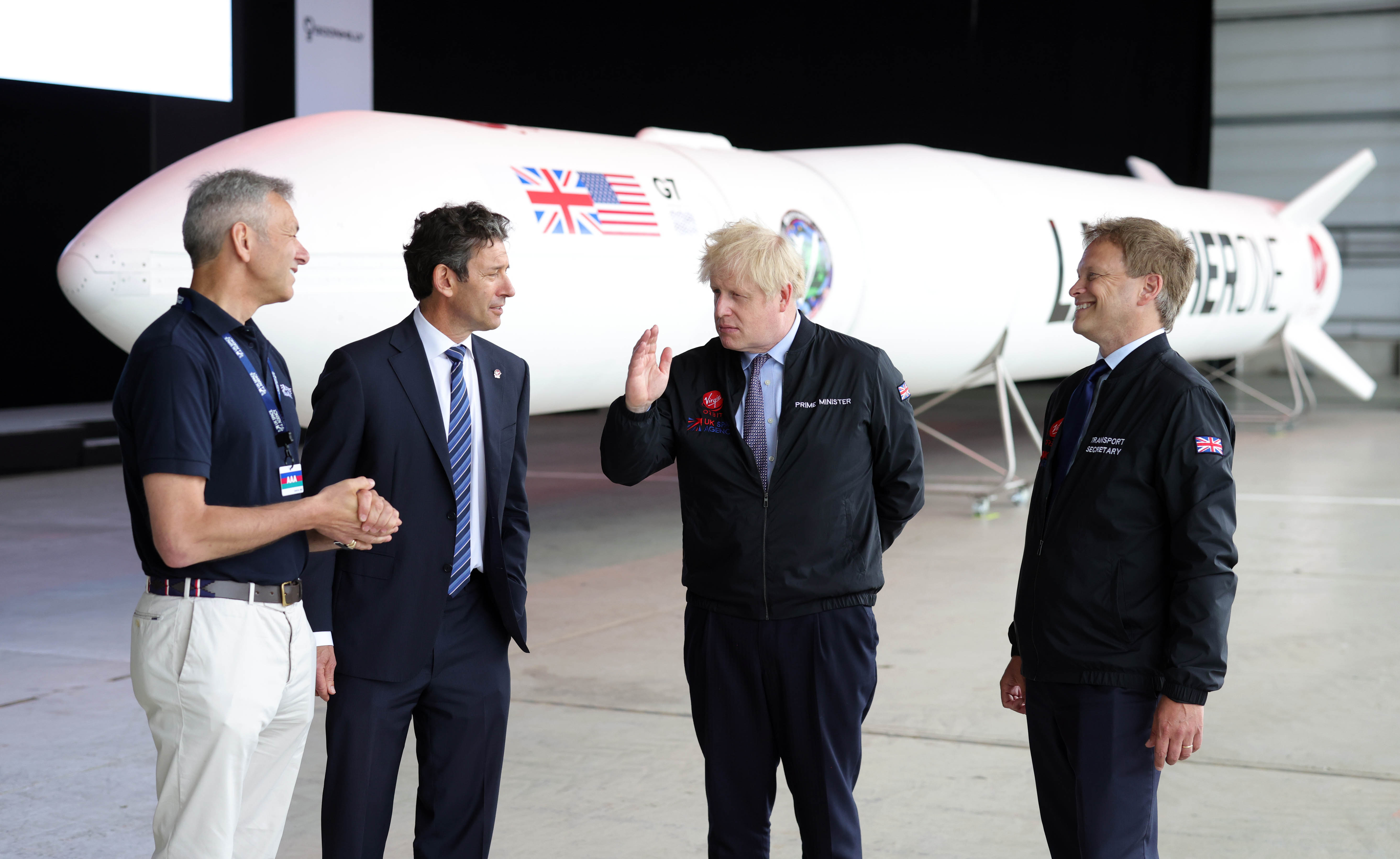
Parsons' photograph of then Prime Minister Boris Johnson and his Transport Secretary Grant Shapps visiting Spaceport Cornwall ahead of the 2021 G7 Summit

On 10 January 2022 one of Parsons' photographs made news in its own right, when Grant Shapps tweeted a version from which Boris Johnson had been erased. The image was taken when Johnson and Shapps visited Spaceport Cornwall ahead of the 2021 G7 Summit in June of that year, and was used by Shapps following the failure of Virgin Orbit's first attempt to send a LauncherOne rocket into orbit from Cornwall. Shapps deleted his tweet within hours, saying through an unnamed source that he had been unaware that the image had been doctored.

== Exhibitions ==
In 2016 the Leica Gallery in London hosted an exhibition of work by Parsons, taken in Nepal and South Sudan, and Ben Stevens, in Mali, carried out in conjunction with the charity Action Against Hunger.

== Awards ==
Parsons won gold in the 2008 PX3 Prix De La Photographie category "Photojournalism/War" for his photograph "Ambushed", depicting the aftermath of a 2007 ambush by the Taliban in Afghanistan. The UK Picture Editors Guild awarded him "Royal Photographer of the Year" in 2014.

== Personal life ==
As of August 2022, Parsons was dating Rhiannon Mills, former royal correspondent for Sky News, who has been working in the press team of King Charles III and Queen Camilla since the summer of 2026. The couple were guests at the wedding celebration of Boris Johnson and Carrie Symonds.
