= Partygate =

British political scandal

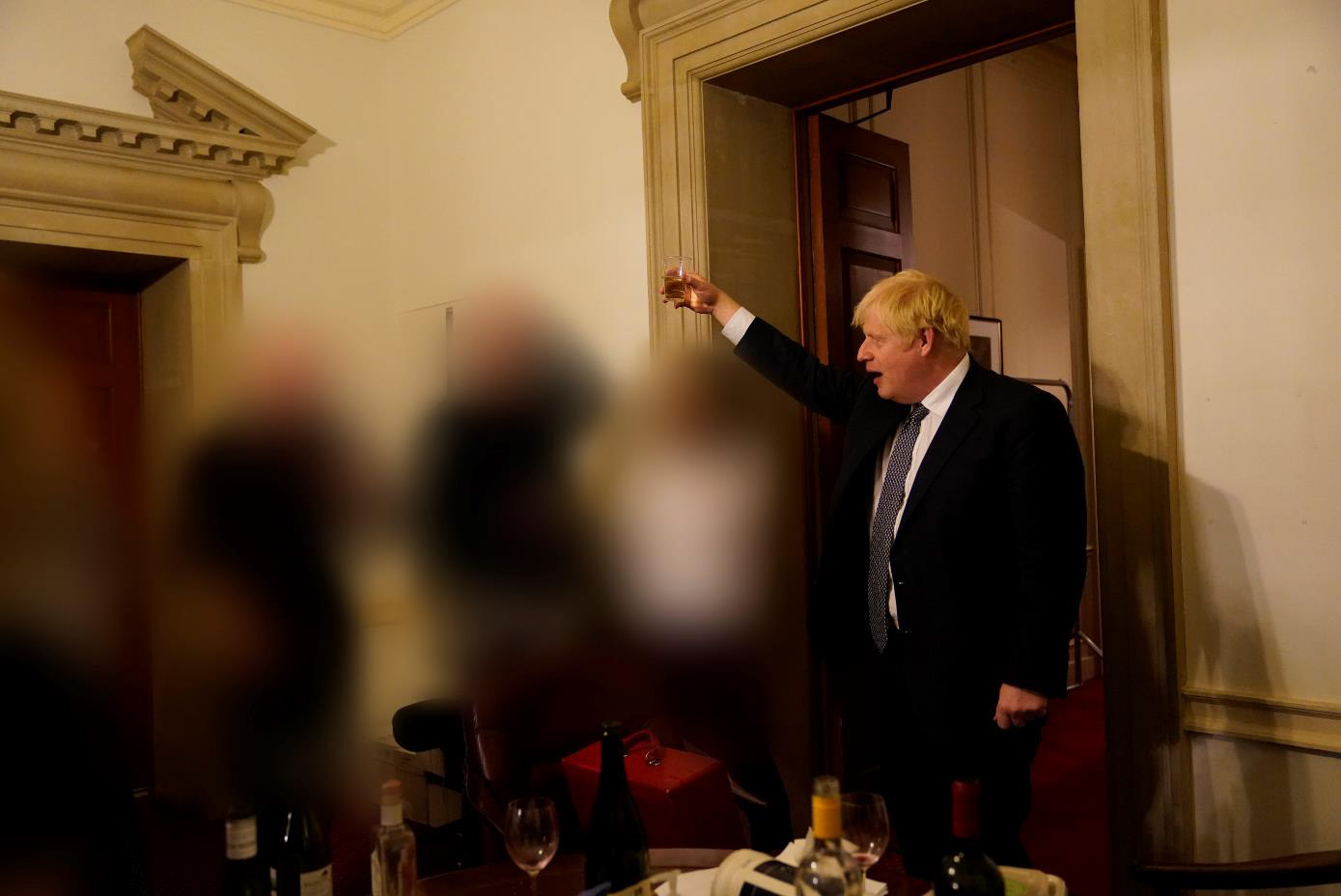
Prime Minister Boris Johnson at one of the gatherings in which some attendees breached COVID-19 regulations. The other participants were made unidentifiable by Sue Gray in this image from her report.

Partygate (Note: For etymology of the "-gate" suffix, see List of -gate scandals and controversies) was a political scandal in the United Kingdom about gatherings of government and Conservative Party staff during the COVID-19 pandemic in 2020 and 2021, when public health restrictions prohibited most gatherings. The scandal contributed to Boris Johnson's downfall as Prime Minister and his resignation as an MP.

While several lockdowns were in place, gatherings took place at 10 Downing Street, its garden and other government and Conservative Party buildings. Reports of these events later attracted media attention, public backlash and political controversy. In January 2022, twelve gatherings came under investigation by the Metropolitan Police, including at least three attended by Johnson, the prime minister. The police issued 126 fixed penalty notices to 83 individuals, including Johnson, his wife Carrie and Rishi Sunak, then Chancellor of the Exchequer, all apologised and paid the penalties.

The first reporting was on 30 November 2021 by the Daily Mirror of 10 Downing Street staff gatherings during the 2020 Christmas season. Johnson said rules had been followed, and Downing Street denied that a party took place. A week later, video of a mock press conference in 10 Downing Street was broadcast in which joking comments about a party having taken place were made. Allegra Stratton was featured in the video during her role as Downing Street Press Secretary. She resigned her subsequent government position after the video surfaced. Shaun Bailey resigned as chair of the London Assembly's Police and Crime Committee after evidence emerged that he had attended a gathering, where it was alleged that Covid regulations had been broken on 14 December 2020 with Conservative Party staff. In January 2022, reports emerged of an event with drinks on 20 May 2020 in the garden of 10 Downing Street during the first national lockdown. Johnson said that he attended and apologised for doing so. Downing Street apologised to Queen Elizabeth II for two events on 16 April 2021, the day before Prince Philip's funeral, during a third lockdown across England. Reports followed of a gathering celebrating Johnson's birthday in June 2020.

After the mock press conference video leaked, on 8 December 2021, Johnson announced a Cabinet Office inquiry, eventually undertaken by civil servant Sue Gray. In January 2022, the Metropolitan Police opened its own investigation into potential breaches of COVID-19 regulations, which delayed Gray's report. An update on Gray's investigation was published on 31 January 2022. Gray's final report in May 2022 described multiple events, including excessive drinking and a lack of respect shown to cleaning and security staff. She concluded that senior political and civil service leadership "must bear responsibility for this culture".

Public disquiet over the events led to a decline in public support for Johnson, the government and the Conservatives, and contributed to the party's loss of the 2021 North Shropshire by-election and poor performance in the 2022 local elections. In early 2022, a number of opposition, and a few Conservative politicians called for Johnson's resignation or a confidence vote. The scandal led to the resignation of five senior Downing Street staff in February, and that of Parliamentary Under-Secretary of State for Justice David Wolfson in April. On 21 April, MPs referred the allegations that Johnson misled Parliament over events to the Parliamentary Privileges Committee. Johnson won the confidence vote with less than 60% of the vote: just over a month later, on 7 July, following mass resignations from his government, Johnson announced he would resign as Prime Minister.

On 9 June 2023, Johnson resigned as an MP after having received the committee's draft report. The committee's final report, published six days later, concluded Johnson had deliberately and repeatedly misled Parliament and impugned and intimidated the committee, would have recommended a 90-day suspension had he not resigned, and recommended that Johnson not be given a courtesy access pass to Parliament otherwise given to former MPs. On 19 June 2023, MPs voted 354 to 7 to accept the results of the privileges committee report, which included Johnson having his privilege to access parliament removed.

== Background ==
=== COVID-19 lockdowns in the United Kingdom ===
In response to the COVID-19 pandemic in the United Kingdom, a UK-wide lockdown began on 23 March 2020 under a new statutory instrument. This was a stay-at-home order that prohibited all non-essential travel and social gatherings. Some rules were incrementally relaxed in the following months in England; starting from 13 May, "two people from separate households were permitted to meet outside in a public place". Six people were allowed to socialise outdoors by June, and indoor social gatherings were permitted from 4 July (only between members of two households).

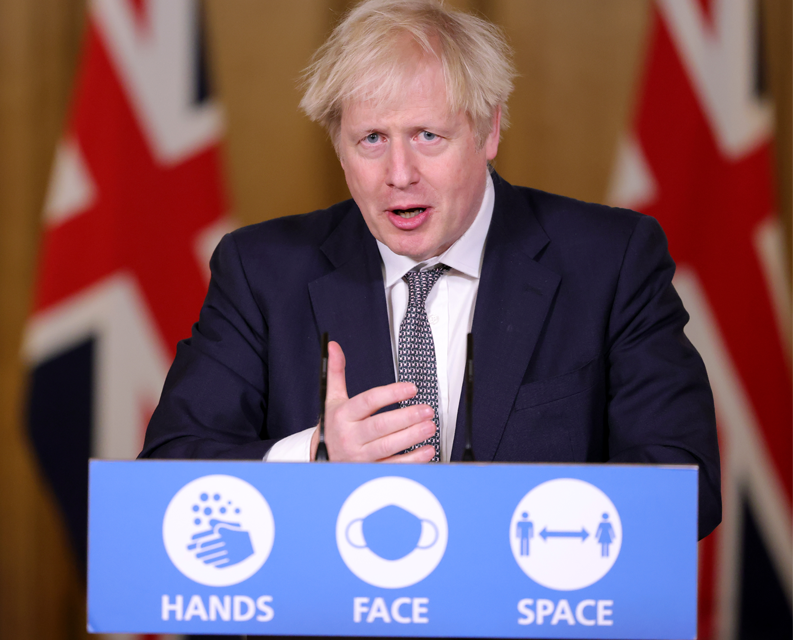
Prime Minister Boris Johnson at a press conference on 16 December 2020, when he announced London would be moved to "Tier 3" rules.

With the second wave of the COVID-19 pandemic in much of England, a second national lockdown started on 5 November 2020. A regional tiered lockdown system replaced this on 2 December. London was initially placed in "Tier 2", was moved to the highest level "Tier 3" on 16 December, and finally placed under a newly introduced stay-at-home order, "Tier 4", on 19 December. Socialising between households or outside of support bubbles was not allowed throughout this period. Household mixing and socialising for Christmas itself was also restricted to a small number of households and only permitted on 25 December across much of the UK, and in London was cancelled altogether.

On 5 January 2021, a third lockdown began across the whole of England. This was gradually lifted in a series of steps beginning 29 March, with social contact limited to groups of six from no more than two households and outdoors, into April.

=== Westminster ===
10 Downing Street is a government building in the City of Westminster, central London, used by some staff in the Cabinet Office.The Cabinet Office is based at 70 Whitehall, connected to 10 and 11 Downing Street.

Social drinks at the end of the week, known as "wine time Friday", were a standing tradition in the Number 10 press office before the pandemic.

ITV News quoted anonymous staff saying that, unlike at other Government departments, there was little attention paid to social distancing or wearing face masks in 10 Downing Street.

== Timeline of reporting and reaction ==
=== 2021 ===
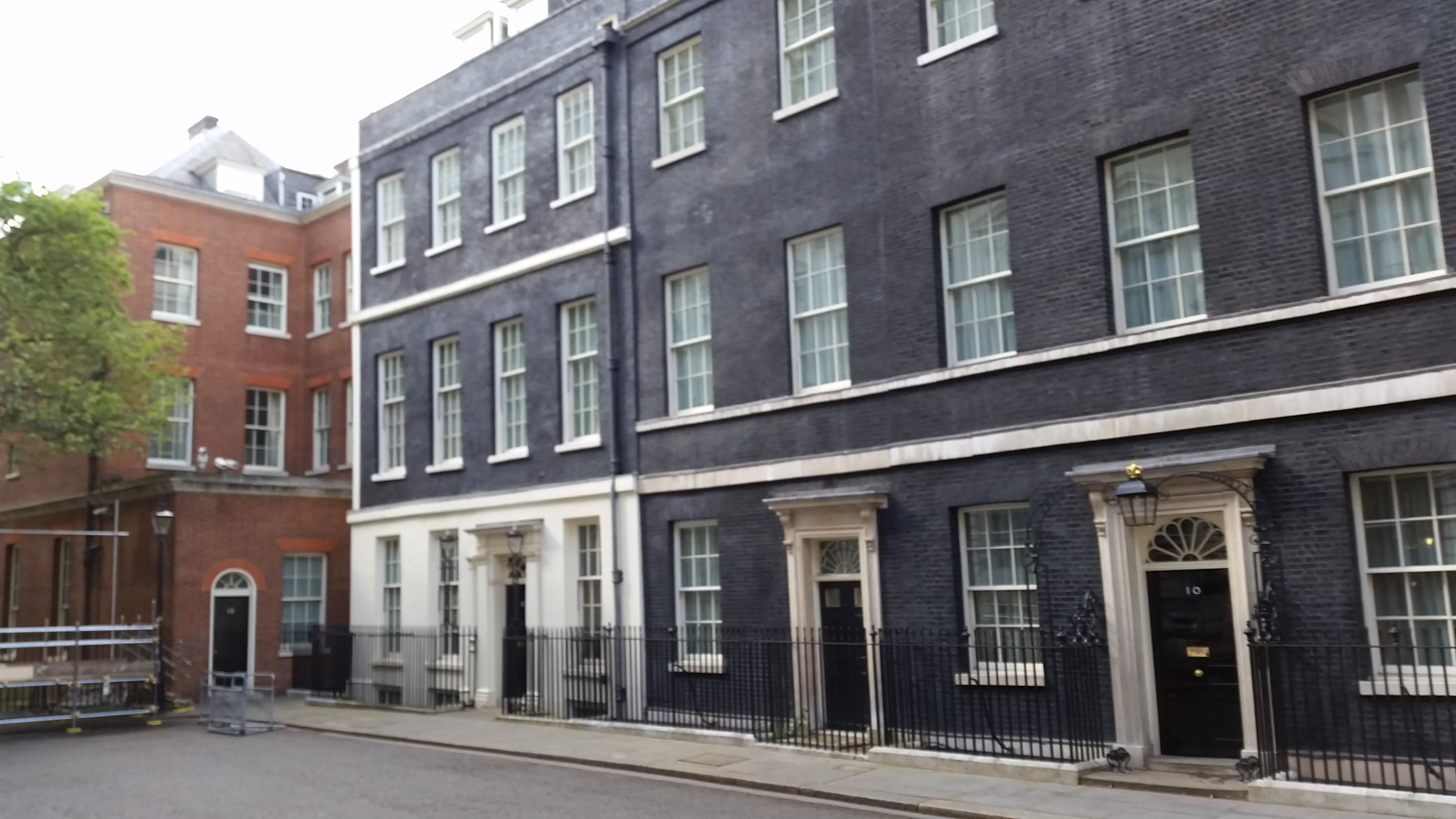
Downing Street, the location of some gatherings.

==== Up to 6 December ====
Pippa Crerar, then the political editor at the Daily Mirror, said that she was first told of breaches of COVID-19 regulations involving the Conservative Party in January 2021, but was unable to get the story "over the line". In October 2021, she received evidence from a contact. As a result, on 30 November 2021, the Daily Mirror reported allegations that some Downing Street staff had held three gatherings in November and December 2020, when London was under COVID-19 tier 3 lockdown restrictions. Crerar has subsequently said that, at that time, she was aware of further allegations, but that they were not sufficiently confirmed to be included.

The restrictions in November and December 2020 prohibited indoor gatherings of more than six people, with exceptions for certain work-related activities. A leaving party for an aide was reported to have been held on 27 November 2020 and attended by Johnson. A Christmas party on 18 December was reported, and a smaller gathering on 13 November "where they were all getting totally plastered". Downing Street denied that a party had taken place, insisting "Covid rules have been followed at all times".

The following day, other media outlets reported further details of the event on 18 December with a source telling the Financial Times that parties were vital for Downing Street staff to relieve stress. At Prime Minister's Questions, Johnson told the Commons: "All guidance was followed completely [in] Number 10". Some Downing Street staff were angered by the denials.

On 3 December, Labour MP Barry Gardiner wrote to the Metropolitan Police asking them to investigate, but they responded saying that they do not normally investigate "retrospective breaches of the Covid-19 regulations". On 5 December, the Justice Secretary Dominic Raab told Andrew Marr that if a "formal party" had taken place "then of course it would be wrong" but that the reports were based on "unsubstantiated, anonymous claims" which is why Downing Street did not respond more directly. Raab also stated "the police don't normally look back and investigate things that have taken place a year ago", about which a Full Fact investigation concluded "Police often investigate alleged offences which took place years before. This is less clear cut in the context of breaches of Covid-19 regulations, which police say they do not routinely investigate retrospectively". On 6 December, former government adviser Dominic Cummings alleged that unnamed journalists attended the reported party and that it was "very unwise for No 10 to lie" about the events; Downing Street reiterated its denials.

==== Stratton video (7–8 December) ====
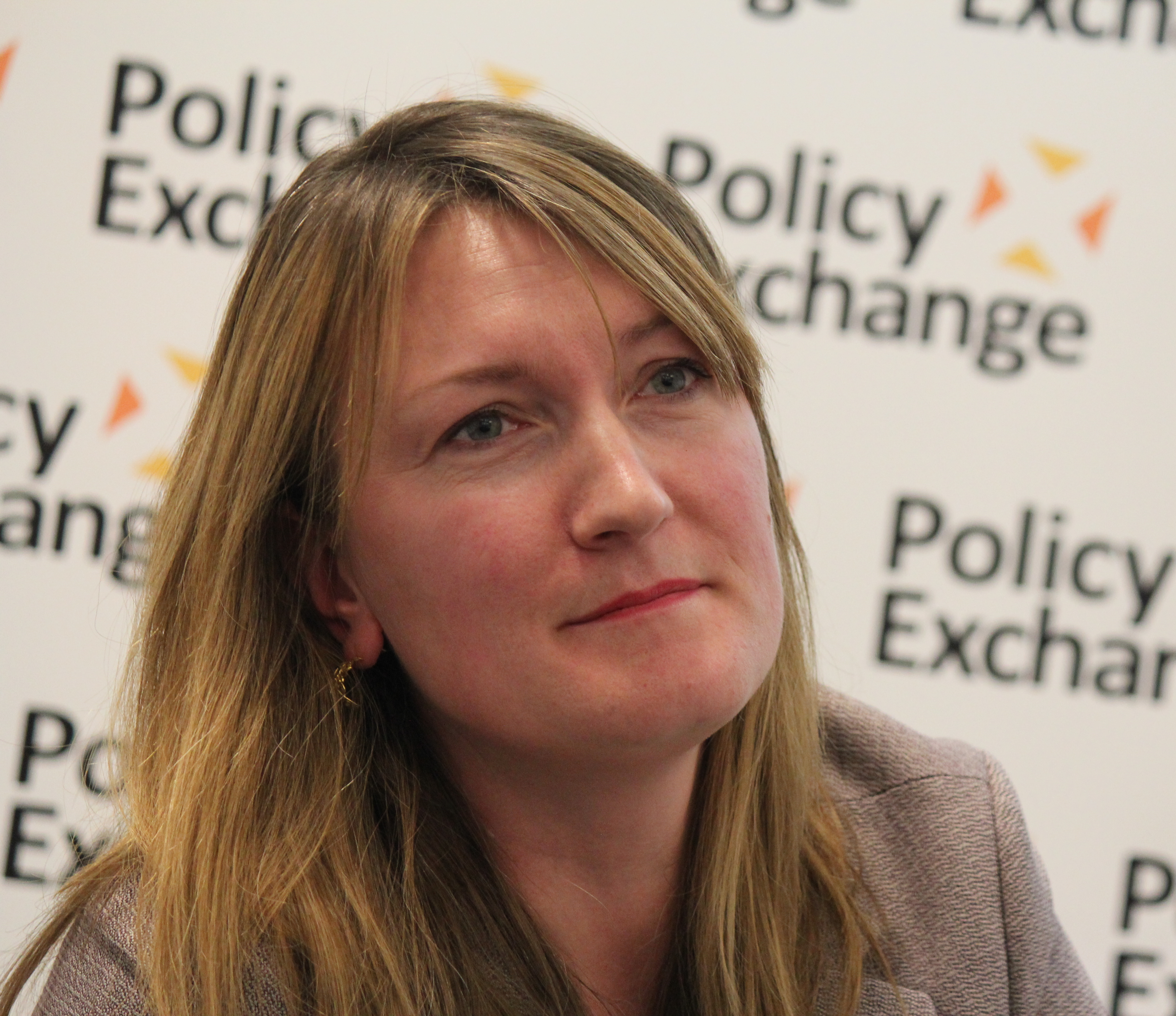
Then-Downing Street Press Secretary Allegra Stratton, who appeared in a leaked video that was part of the controversy, and subsequently resigned.

ITV News had been contacted by a Downing Street staff member with a video clip, that had been widely circulated at Number 10, before the Daily Mirror first broke the Partygate story. That source, frustrated by the government's denials to the Mirror's story, agreed to let ITV News air the video, which they did on 7 December 2021. In the video, then-Downing Street Press Secretary Allegra Stratton and other Downing Street staff – during a mock press conference on 22 December 2020 – made joking references to a Christmas gathering in 10 Downing Street four days earlier on 18 December 2020. The leaked 47-second clip began with media advisor Ed Oldfield playing the role of a journalist and asking Stratton: "I've just seen reports on Twitter that there was a Downing Street Christmas party on Friday night, do you recognise those reports?" In response, Stratton and other Downing Street staff joked about the "fictional party" being just "cheese and wine" and a "business meeting", with "no social distancing".

The Guardian said that the video gave "the strong impression that a staff-based party took place on 18 December 2020 and that No 10 officials realised that they were likely to have broken rules". BBC News reported that the event had "several dozen" attendees, and that "party games were played, food and drink were served, and the party went on past midnight". The Times reported allegations that the party was organised via WhatsApp with staff requested to bring Secret Santa gifts.

On 8 December, Johnson addressed the house and said he was "furious" to see that video, and that he "apologises unreservedly" for the offence and impression given by it. He said it "shocked" him to see it, as he had had repeated assurances that no party had taken place.

Later on 8 December, during Prime Minister's Questions, Labour MP Catherine West asked: "Will the Prime Minister tell the House whether there was a party in Downing Street on 13 November?" Johnson replied: "No, but I am sure that whatever happened, the guidance was followed and the rules were followed at all times." Three hours later, Stratton resigned from her position as government spokesperson for the COP26 summit and apologised for her remarks which she said she would regret "for the rest of [her] days". ITV News reported in January 2023 that, at the time, staff in Downing Street were "shocked" at the reporting and Johnson's denials. Staff also said that Stratton herself never attended any of the parties. ITV News quoted one staff member as saying Downing Street initially thought that, after Stratton's resignation, the story would be gone within a week.

On 8 December, the Metropolitan Police said they had "received a significant amount of correspondence relating to allegations reported in the media" and that this had been "considered by detectives in detail, as well as footage published by ITV News". They concluded that the correspondence and footage did not provide evidence of a breach of regulations and said they would not open an investigation into it at that time

==== 9 December onwards ====
BBC News reported on 9 December 2021 that Jack Doyle, the deputy Downing Street Director of Communications at the time, attended the event on 18 December, gave a speech, and handed out awards at the function. On 10 December, the government's Chief Whip Mark Spencer said that the event had been a "meeting", rather than a social gathering.

On 11 December, reports emerged that two dozen HM Treasury staff gathered for drinks on 25 November 2020 to celebrate Chancellor Rishi Sunak's Autumn Spending Review. On 12 December, Downing Street confirmed that Johnson "briefly" took part in a virtual Christmas quiz held at the venue on 15 December 2020 after the Sunday Mirror published a picture of him participating via his computer in the event, in a room with two other people. Downing Street said he was there to thank staff for their work during the pandemic and that the event was a "virtual" one, while Johnson himself responded that he "certainly broke no rules".

The Department for Work and Pensions (DWP) also confirmed that staff working past normal employment hours drank alcohol and ate takeaway "late into the night" on a number of occasions during COVID restrictions after this was reported by the Sunday Mirror.

Northern Ireland First Minister, Paul Givan, and his deputy Michelle O'Neill, said the controversy had damaged the public health message in Northern Ireland. On 12 December, The Independent reported that senior police officers feared people would be less likely to comply with any new restrictions because of the controversy. The news website said they had gathered anecdotal evidence of terse exchanges between police officers and members of the public in early December 2020.

On 14 December, Conservative politician Shaun Bailey, a member of the London Assembly and a former candidate for Mayor of London, resigned as chair of the Police and Crime Committee of the Assembly after his attendance at a gathering that was alleged to have breached COVID-19 regulations. Shortly after his resignation, photographs were published of him and over 20 members of staff at a gathering with drinks and a buffet held in the basement of Conservative Campaign Headquarters on 14 December 2020, when he was the party's mayoral candidate. Four aides on secondment from the party who attended the gathering had been disciplined by the party the week before his resignation, for holding a "raucous" event. Cabinet member Grant Shapps stated that the event was "absolutely unacceptable", and not authorised by the Conservative Party. The Metropolitan Police later said they would contact two people who were at the party over possible breaches of the Health Protection (Coronavirus, Restrictions) Regulations. On 11 November 2022, the police said they would be taking no action over the matter as "the investigation reviewed all the material thoroughly and after careful consideration, it was determined that there was insufficient evidence to disprove the version of events provided by attendees to a standard that would meet the threshold required".

On 16 December, a joint investigation by The Guardian and The Independent reported allegations that Johnson attended a party in Downing Street on 15 May 2020, during the first national lockdown. Downing Street issued a statement, saying: "On 15 May 2020 the prime minister held a series of meetings throughout the afternoon, including briefly with the then health and care secretary and his team in the garden following a press conference. The prime minister went to his residence shortly after 7pm. A small number of staff required to be in work remained in the Downing Street garden for part of the afternoon and evening". On 19 December, The Guardian published a photograph of the event showing 19 people drinking wine and noting "there are no laptops, files or notepads to take minutes on show". Johnson was shown sitting next to his then-fiancée, Carrie Symonds, who was holding their newborn son. Downing Street insisted the photograph showed a work meeting.

The Metropolitan Police referred itself and their role in the policing and security of the buildings to the Independent Office for Police Conduct (IOPC), the police watchdog, on 17 December, following a complaint by Green Party peer Jenny Jones, who said that there was a "conflict of interest and a potential cover up" in relation to the police declining to investigate.

=== 2022 ===
==== Up to 19 January ====
In a blog post on 7 January, Dominic Cummings argued that the photo from 15 May 2020 in the garden of 10 Downing Street did not show a party. He described having a work meeting with Boris Johnson and the Prime Minister's Principal Private Secretary Martin Reynolds, with Carrie Symonds subsequently joining them. Meanwhile, according to his account, various other groups of people were also meeting in the garden, and staff had been advised to meet outside in the garden where there was less risk of COVID-19 transmission.

Cummings said that there was a "socially distanced drinks" gathering in the garden on 20 May 2020 that he and another special adviser cautioned against. On 10 January, ITV News showed a 20 May 2020 email sent on behalf of Reynolds to over one hundred 10 Downing Street staff, inviting them "to make the most of the lovely weather and have some socially distanced drinks in the No 10 garden this evening (...) bring your own booze!" Various news organisations reported that around 30–40 people were present that evening, eating picnic food and drinking, including Johnson and Symonds. In his 15 January 2022 column in The Times, Tim Shipman relayed accounts of a meeting of Johnson's team which was held in Downing Street on 11 January, the day after ITV News showed the Reynolds email. He said it was obvious that Johnson was furious with them, and had left them in no doubt that he thought they had let him down. Also that Johnson's view seemed to be "that he is not to blame, that everyone else is to blame" and had asked: "How has all this been allowed to happen? How has it come to this? How haven't you sorted this out?" Shipman wrote that sources present said senior staff "studied the floor". Shipman added that "insiders said Reynolds, his deputy, Stuart Glassborow, Dan Rosenfield, ... and some members of the communications team are likely to be out of a job when a report by the mandarin Sue Gray is published". Shipman added that an MP likened it to Harold Macmillan's 1962 Night of the Long Knives (when he sacked a third of his cabinet), "Boris is preparing to lay down the lives of his staff to save his own. It will be the Night of the Long Scapegoats". Johnson initially declined to comment on whether he was present or not. A spokesman for the prime minister said he still had confidence in Reynolds. Campaigners, including the Covid-19 Bereaved Families for Justice group, called for Reynolds to be dismissed.

On 11 January, the Metropolitan Police said it was in contact with the government over "widespread reporting relating to alleged breaches" of COVID rules. There was additional reporting of a party in Downing Street on 18 December, with Reynolds said to have been present. Shaun Bailey resigned as chair of a second London Assembly committee, the economy committee, in addition to his resignation from the police and crime committee in December. Opposition party leaders Ed Davey and Nicola Sturgeon called on Johnson to resign. Tory donor, John Caudwell told Boris Johnson to, "sort it out or step aside", Caudwell added, "Each one of these new revelations gives greater force to the accusation that areas of the government think it's 'one rule for them, one rule for the rest of us'."

On 12 January, Johnson, speaking at PMQs in the House of Commons, said that he had attended the gathering and apologised for doing so. He said that he was present for about 25 minutes and that he thought it was an allowed work meeting. He said: "I should have recognised that even if it (the gathering) could be said technically to fall within the guidance, there would be millions and millions of people who simply would not see it that way". In response, the leader of the opposition, Keir Starmer, asked if Johnson would now "do the decent thing and resign". Other MPs also called on Johnson to resign, including Scottish Conservatives leader Douglas Ross. On 13 January 2022, 27 of the 31 Conservative Scottish MSPs came out publicly against Johnson. Articles in New Statesman and The Guardian, among others, criticised the wording of Johnson's apology for being insufficient.

On 13 January, it was reported that two separate parties were held in 10 Downing Street on 16 April 2021. These were leaving events for James Slack, Johnson's director of communications, and a photographer. The date was the eve of the funeral of Prince Philip, Duke of Edinburgh, when the UK was observing a period of national mourning, and England was in step two of its lockdown roadmap, with indoor mixing banned. Johnson was out of London at the time. The photographer's party reportedly involved loud music, a DJ and a staff member sent to the Co-op store on the Strand to fill a suitcase with bottles of wine. The next day, Slack and Downing Street confirmed there was an event, with Slack apologising for what happened. Number 10 apologised to Queen Elizabeth II for the two parties.

On 14 January The Independent reported that Johnson had drawn up a plan to retain his premiership. The Guardian said it was his allies who did the planning. The plan was said by The Independent to include a list of officials who should resign over the parties controversy, a communications strategy for cabinet ministers, as well as "sounding out support" for leadership rivals from backbenchers. The Daily Mirror reported that Downing Street staff had regular Friday evening events with wine, for which a dedicated fridge was bought, being delivered on 11 December 2020. What were called "Wine time Fridays" were scheduled into the diaries of about 50 staff from 4–7pm. Johnson was reported to visit some of these and to be aware of their existence. 10 Downing Street did not deny the allegations.

On 16 January, in a column in The Times, Dominic Lawson said a former Downing Street official had told him of at least two people warning Johnson that the 20 May 2020 event should be cancelled and that Johnson said they were "overreacting". Johnson's spokesperson said that the report was not accurate, although other journalists were reported to have corroborated it. On 17 January, Cummings reiterated his claim that Johnson knew in advance about the party, that Cummings raised concerns about it and that Johnson said it could go ahead, and consequently that Johnson had lied to Parliament about what happened. Cummings said he would "swear under oath this is what happened". Sky News reported a second source also said Johnson had been warned in advance about the party. BBC News Online reported that two other former Downing Street officials said that "they remembered Mr Cummings telling them that day he had warned the prime minister not to allow the drinks to go ahead".

Starmer, a one time Director of Public Prosecutions said: "I think he broke the law. I think he's as good as admitted that he broke the law. (...) I think it's pretty obvious what's happened, this industrial-scale partying had been going on at Downing Street, not much of it is really denied, and I think that the public have made up their mind. I think the facts speak for themselves. I think the Prime Minister broke the law, I think he then lied about what had happened. (...) Once Sue Gray has come to her findings, she will set out all the facts, she is very well respected, I think that all of those should be passed to the police to look at".

On 17 January, the Daily Mirror reported that Johnson attended a leaving party for Steve Higham, his former defence advisor, shortly before Christmas 2020 while strict coronavirus restrictions applied in London. Johnson was reported to have attended for a few minutes and to have given a speech.

On 18 January, The Guardian reported that Conservative rebel MPs had a plan to oust Johnson from office, named "Operation Rinka", after the dog that was shot in the Thorpe affair. On the same day, Johnson gave an interview to Beth Rigby, after one of his immediate family had tested positive for COVID the previous week and having not appeared in public himself for nearly a week. He repeatedly apologised, and said of the 20 May 2020 event: "I'm saying categorically that nobody told me, nobody said this was something that was against the rules". Sky News reported that one Conservative MP described Johnson in the interview as "absolutely beaten" and Rigby described him as looking "defeated". The i described the interview as "excruciating".

Asked about Johnson saying he did not know it was a party, Starmer said: "The cover-up isn't worse than the crime, but the cover-up compounds the crime. Johnson's now on his third defence. His first defence when we tackled him on this at the beginning of December was: 'I've been assured there were no parties,' and his second defence when the video came out was: 'I'm furious there have been these parties; I've only just found out.' And if the third defence is true, then obviously the first two are false – and that's a major problem for him".

==== From 24 January ====
On 24 January, ITV News reported that a surprise birthday get-together was held for Johnson on 19 June 2020, allegedly organised by Carrie Symonds. Up to 30 people were said to have been present, including Johnson, Symonds and interior designer Lulu Lytle, who was working on Johnson and Symonds' flat at the time. It was said a Union Jack cake was served and attendees sang "Happy Birthday". Downing Street said the prime minister attended for less than ten minutes. A spokesperson for Lytle's company said: "Lulu was not invited to any birthday celebrations for the Prime Minister as a guest. Lulu entered the Cabinet Room briefly as requested, while waiting to speak with the Prime Minister". The Chancellor Rishi Sunak was reported to have been "unintentionally present" when the cake was served, while waiting for a meeting. The Guardian reported Downing Street sources saying that, in the evening, Johnson celebrated outside with family, as allowed under the then rules. ITV News alleged that family friends then went up to Johnson's flat. A Number 10 spokesperson denied this, saying: "This is totally untrue. In line with the rules at the time the prime minister hosted a small number of family members outside that evening". More than two people were forbidden to socialise indoors, while up to six were allowed outdoors. Sue Gray, who ran an inquiry into events, was reported to have known about the event prior to the news breaking.

On 25 January, in an interview with Channel 4 News, Northern Ireland Minister Conor Burns explained his understanding of the Prime Minister's role in the event. He said people came to the Cabinet room, where Johnson was working, and presented him with a cake. When pressed, Burns summarised it saying Johnson was, "in a sense, ambushed with a cake". Burns' comments were ridiculed online in a series of memes. Burns later told The Daily Telegraph's podcast that he had since been told "that there actually wasn't a cake". The Times had published an article in June 2020 reporting the gathering on Johnson's birthday and that he "tucked into a Union Jack cake".

Starmer again called on Johnson to resign. Conservative peer Baroness Warsi said Johnson should, "think long and hard about what is in the best interest of this country. (...) Is me staying in office allowing me to run this office in a way in which is making the country better, or am I a distraction?" On 28 January, Starmer said that "the whole of government is paralysed because the police are now looking at what the PM was getting up to in Downing Street". Alistair Carmichael (Liberal Democrat) and Ian Blackford (SNP) both said that the delay increasingly gave the appearance of an establishment "stitch-up".

Late on 29 January, The Times reported that Gray had discovered that friends of Carrie Symonds' knew the PIN code to access her flat with Boris Johnson in 11 Downing Street. Cummings said that, in early 2020, he discovered highly confidential Government documents were left lying around in the flat, leading to him and Martin Reynolds instituting tighter controls on what papers left Johnson's office.

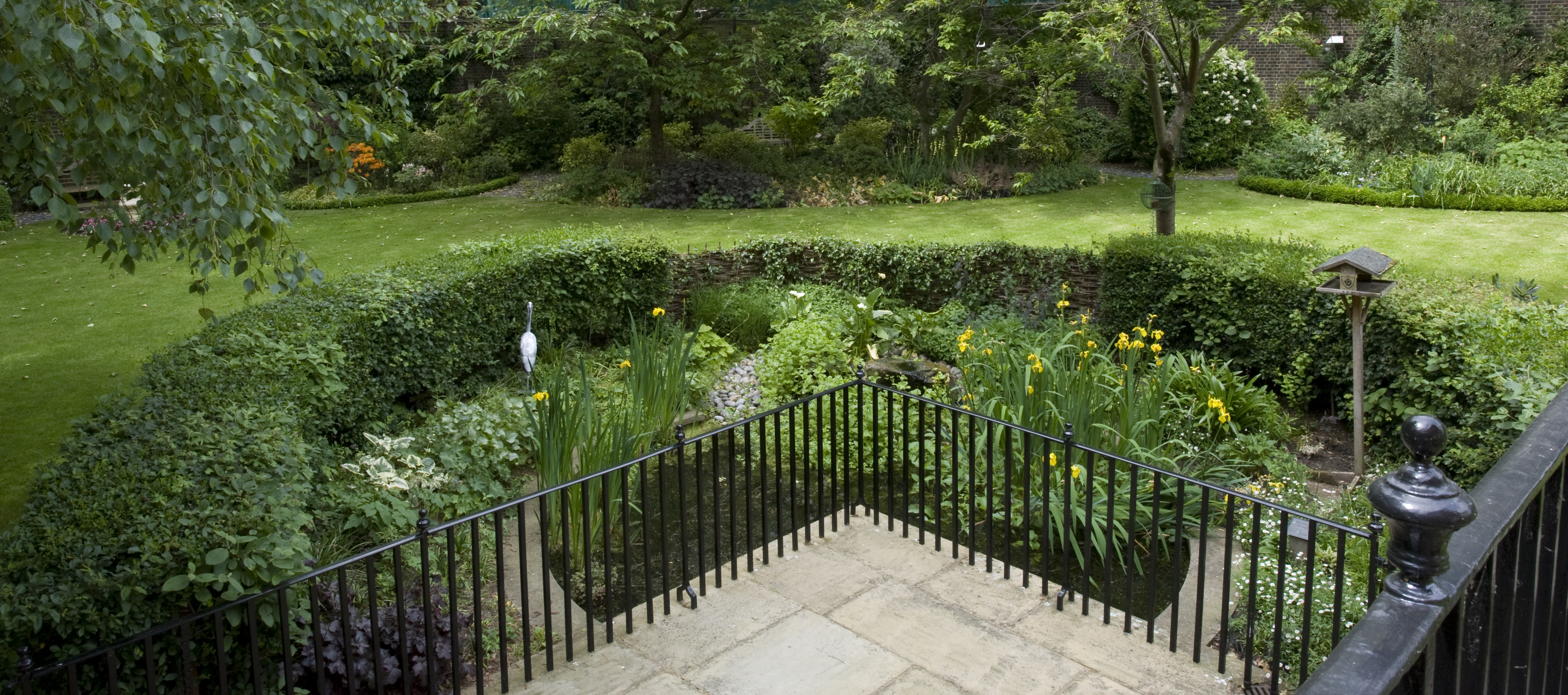
Gray commented on the use of the Garden of 10 and 11 Downing Street in her update.

Unable to publish her full report because of the ongoing police investigation, Gray published an update on her investigation on 31 January 2022. This covered a number of events that had not previously been reported. There was an accompanying debate in the Commons. Starmer said: "The prime minister repeatedly assured the House that the guidance was followed and the rules were followed. But we now know that 12 cases have breached the threshold for criminal investigation (...) including the party on May 20, 2020, which we know the prime minister attended, and the party on November 13, 2020 in the prime minister's flat. There can be no doubt that the prime minister himself is now subject to criminal investigation. (...) it is already clear what the report disclosed is the most damning conclusion possible".

In the Commons debate on the topic, Johnson said Starmer "spent most of his time [as Director of Public Prosecutions] prosecuting journalists [a reference to Julian Assange's prosecution] and failing to prosecute Jimmy Savile". Full Fact fact checkers said: "Starmer was head of the CPS when the decision was made not to prosecute Savile but he was not the reviewing lawyer for the case". The BBC "found no evidence that Sir Keir was involved at any point in the decision not to charge Savile". Speaker of the House of Commons Lindsay Hoyle also criticised Johnson's accusation. Three days later, Johnson stated that he was "not talking about the leader of the opposition's personal record when he was DPP. I was making a point about his responsibility for the organisation as a whole". Munira Mirza, Director of the Number 10 Policy Unit, resigned on 3 February, saying Johnson should have apologised. On the same day, Jack Doyle quit as Johnson's communications director. Doyle talked about the difficulty of his job in recent weeks, but also said that he had always intended to only work in government for two years. Starmer later needed police protection, following a mob threatening violence outside parliament. Starmer and others blamed Johnson for inciting the disturbance. Starmer experienced online death threats, he said: "It's very important for me to say that what the prime minister said was wrong, it was very wrong. He knew exactly what he was doing".

Cummings said there were photos of the alleged 13 November party in the Johnsons' flat.

On 4 February, 10 Downing Street announced the resignations of both Dan Rosenfield, Johnson's chief of staff, and Martin Reynolds, his principal private secretary. Sky News described this as "an apparent mass exodus from Downing Street amid the fallout from the partygate scandal" (by 22 April they described it as "part of a purge of the prime minister's senior team in the wake of the partygate scandal"). Rosenfield and Reynolds were to continue in their roles until their successors were appointed. BBC News reported that Johnson's official spokesman said Doyle's, Rosenfield's and Reynolds's resignations were as a result of "mutual decisions". A fifth adviser in the Number 10 Policy Unit, Elena Narozanski, resigned the following day. BBC News reported that energy minister, Greg Hands said the resignations came after Johnson "made it clear there would be a shake-up" in Downing Street organisation, following criticism of it in the Gray investigation update. Mirza considered Johnson's comment "scurrilous". The Daily Mirror reported sources saying the police had a photograph of Johnson with a can of Estrella beer standing next to Rishi Sunak at the 19 June 2020 Cabinet Room birthday event. It is reported to be one of the 300 images given by Gray to the Metropolitan Police, and to have been taken by the official No 10 photographer, Andrew Parsons.

During Prime Minister's Questions on 9 February, the Daily Mirror released another photograph from the 15 December 2020 Christmas quiz, showing Johnson and three other people, one wearing tinsel, one a Santa hat and "what appears to be champagne and a half-eaten packet of crisps".

==== After the conclusion of the police investigation ====
Three anonymous Downing Street insiders spoke to the BBC Panorama programme about the conditions, culture and morale inside government offices during the COVID-19 lockdown. The insiders described how, as Cain's leaving do developed, "there were about 30 people, if not more, in a room. Everyone was stood shoulder to shoulder, some people on each other's laps... one or two people". They characterised the event on the day before Prince Philip's funeral as a "lively event... a general party with people dancing around." They added that security guards told them to leave the building and go into the garden when it became too loud. They said events were routine and that some staff were worried about the potential consequences, but that it seemed difficult to raise concerns. One said that, for staff who were working long hours, it was a lifeline. They all felt that the culture developed and it seemed the prime minister "wanted to be liked" and for staff to be able to "let their hair down." The BBC's Laura Kuenssberg reported on 24 May 2022 that the prime minister's official spokesman had said that Johnson took the revelations about what happened during lockdown "very seriously". The spokesman added that Sue Gray's interim report "raised some of these challenges" and that as a result, "wholesale changes" had been made to the way No 10 operated with "further changes to come."

One senior figure said: "No 10 staff were 'essential workers' because the office is the UK's strategic headquarters. It is extraordinary that the government risked the strategic HQ's capability by risking a single [Covid] outbreak closing the building completely, leaving the UK unguided."

==== After the publication of Gray's report ====
When presenting the report to the House of Commons on the afternoon of 25 May 2022, Johnson said he was humbled and took full responsibility, and renewed his apology for the 19 June 2020 Cabinet Office event which led to him receiving a fixed penalty notice (FPN). He said that at events he had briefly attended to thank staff, he had not known about subsequent rule breaking now revealed. Improvements had been made to organisation and senior management. Starmer said the government had set a low standard for conduct, and stated his own pledge to resign if a FPN was given to him for the Durham event. Johnson was asked by Conservative Robert Buckland if he had "deliberately lied" when telling the Commons that rules had been followed, Johnson said no, he had believed he was attending work events and, except for the Cabinet Office event, "that has been vindicated by the investigation".

It is alleged that there was a gathering in the Johnsons' flat on 19 June 2020, the Prime Minister's birthday. This was not mentioned in Gray's report. The allegation is that a Downing Street aide received text messages from Carrie Johnson (then Carrie Symonds) that said she was in the flat with two friends, with Boris Johnson later joining them. A spokesperson for Carrie Johnson said that Gray had been made aware of these texts, but an aide with copies of the texts said, according to The Sunday Times, that they wrote to Case about them, offering to share them with Gray's team, but was ignored. Labour called for a further investigation.

On 7 June 2022, Patrick Vallance, the Government's chief scientific adviser, in a reply to a question about whether Partygate had tarnished his feelings about the time during the pandemic that he spent in government said, "it was really important at all stages that everyone stuck to the rules [...] It only works when people stick to them and it's very disappointing that that wasn't the case".

The Guardian has carried reports that cocaine residue was found after two of the events at 10 Downing Street.

=== 2023 ===
In January 2023, ITV News reported allegations from an anonymous source who worked in Downing Street that Johnson had joked to staff at Lee Cain's leaving event (13 November 2020) that "this is the most unsocially distanced party in the UK right now". A spokesperson for Johnson did not deny that he made the comment.

ITV News also reported claims by Downing Street staff that individuals had shared their stories before filling out the Metropolitan Police questionnaires, that some staff shredded documents or did not hand over photographs of events, and that only half of the events were ever investigated by Sue Gray or the police. Staff were also alleged to have had sex at the event on the evening prior to Prince Philip's funeral.

ITV News also reported allegations that wine time Fridays, end of the week drinks parties held by the Number 10 press office, continued through lockdown with Johnson often attending, without wearing a face mask. Staff say that when they raised concerns with senior civil servants about breaches of COVID-19 regulations, their concerns were dismissed. Staff also alleged that there were additional parties that have never been reported.

Unmesh Desai, the deputy chair of the London Assembly's police and crime committee, wrote to the Metropolitan Police commissioner, Mark Rowley, asking them to re-open their investigation. Desai said that new evidence directly contradicted Johnson's claim he did not know about rulebreaking at 10 Downing Street, and said: "I have raised the apparent inconsistency in how the MPS [Metropolitan Police Service] have approached the investigation with your predecessors – particularly regarding why the former prime minister was issued with only one fixed penalty notice for his birthday party, but not for the other events, including the leaving drinks where there is photographic evidence of him holding a glass of champagne and making a toast."

==== COVID-19 Inquiry evidence ====
In May 2023, in preparation of material for the COVID-19 Inquiry, the Cabinet Office found that Johnson's diary showed him hosting visits by friends and family to Chequers between June 2020 and May 2021, as well as further events at Downing Street. They referred the matter to the police, who they contacted on 16 May 2023, as possible breaches of COVID-19 restrictions. A report was received by Thames Valley Police (for Chequers) on 18 May and by the Metropolitan Police (for Downing Street) on 19 May. A spokesperson for Johnson said, "Lawyers have examined the events in question and advised that they were lawful." The Guardian reported that there were about 12 events, including ones not previously investigated by the police or covered by Sue Gray's report.

Subsequent reports in The Sunday Times alleged visits to Chequers by Richard Sharp (then BBC Chair), Sam Blyth (Johnson's cousin) and Conservative peer David Brownlow, as well as an overnight stay by two friends of Carrie Johnson in May 2021. Rachel Johnson, Boris's sister, has talked of visiting Chequers during this period saying, "as far as I am aware, all the rules were followed whenever I went to Chequers".

The decision to refer the matter to the police was made by civil servants and the current Prime Minister, Rishi Sunak, and his government were not involved.

In June, the Privileges Committee Inquiry revealed that there were 16 events referred to police.

On 4 July 2023, the Metropolitan and Thames Valley Police jointly announced that they would not launch an investigation into events at Chequers and 10 Downing Street referred to them by Cabinet Office officials. A statement said that following "further clarification" on the diary entries, they had decided that the events did "not meet the retrospective criteria for opening an investigation".

==== June–October 2023 ====
On 9 June 2023, Johnson's resignation honours list was published and gave honours for various people involved in Partygate events, including Martin Reynolds. Shaun Bailey was given a peerage, while Ben Mallet, the campaign director for the party's 2021 London Mayoral election, was given an OBE. Both had been pictured at the 14 December 2020 gathering at Conservative Campaign Headquarters. Shelley Williams-Walker, who was head of operations for No 10 at the time, was appointed Dame Commander of the Order of the British Empire (DBE). She was alleged to have been in charge of music at the 15 April 2021 party. There was also an honour for Jack Doyle, Johnson's former director of communications when the Partygate story first broke and who had been present at an 18 December 2020 event; a peerage was given to chief of staff Dan Rosenfield, who was in office during the period of Partygate events; and a CBE was given to Rosie Bate-Williams, a press adviser who handled some of Johnson's denials.

Later the same day, Johnson resigned as an MP, in response to the Commons Privilege Committee inquiry into him. The Commons Privilege Committee inquiry reported on 15 June 2023. In additional material, the Committee released a written report from an anonymous No. 10 official, received on 7 February 2023.

On 17 June, the Daily Mirror released a short video clip, from the 14 December 2020 Christmas party at Conservative Campaign Headquarters, showing people ignoring social distancing, including two people dancing together closely. An attendee could be heard saying it was OK to film "as long as we don't stream that we're, like, bending the rules". Shaun Bailey had been in attendance, but had left before the video was taken. The video showed Ben Mallet. On 17 June, Secretary of State for Levelling Up, Housing and Communities Michael Gove apologised for the video, saying it was "indefensible". Bailey apologised "unreservedly" over the video on 19 June.

On 18 June, the BBC reported the invitation, sent out on behalf of Mallet, for the Christmas party, which described it with the words "Jingle and Mingle".

The Conservative MP Tobias Ellwood said Bailey should consider declining his peerage.

On 19 June, the Metropolitan Police said they were considering the video as it was not seen as part of their prior investigation. In July, they confirmed that they had re-opened their investigation into the event. They also said they were investigating an event in Parliament on 8 December 2020.

24 additional Fixed Penalty Notices for the event were recommended by the police in October 2023.

=== 2025 ===
The leaking in September 2025 of a set of records from Johnson's private office suggested further lockdown breaches had occurred, including a meeting with David Brownlow on 6 November 2020, and Boris and Carrie Johnson hosting three guests on 20 June 2020.

== Events ==
In addition to the specific dated events listed below, "wine time Fridays" starting at 4pm were a regular occurrence at Downing Street throughout the period. Dominic Cummings has claimed there may have also been parties at Chequers. The Department for Work and Pensions confirmed staff drank alcohol and ate takeaway food together "on a number of occasions" while working late during the period of COVID-19 restrictions.

On 22 January 2022, The Sunday Times reported that Gray was also investigating Carrie Johnson (then Carrie Symonds) hosting two friends (who worked at the time for Michael Gove at 70 Whitehall, part of the Downing Street complex) in the Downing Street flat multiple times during lockdown. It was stated that the visits were for "work reasons", but a Whitehall source said that no officials were present. On 25 January 2022, the New Statesman published an analysis stating that "both Boris and Carrie Johnson do not believe they have done anything wrong, as they consider gatherings among those who worked at Downing Street during the pandemic to have been part of a 'household bubble'".

Gray looked into 16 events and the police at 12 of them, including 6 that Johnson reportedly attended.

=== During first national lockdown ===
- 15 May 2020: about twenty people were present in the garden of 10 Downing Street, including Johnson; The Guardian published a photograph showing Johnson, Carrie Symonds, then Health Minister Matt Hancock and 17 staff members with cheese and wine. A spokesperson for 10 Downing Street described the gathering as a work meeting. Sky News reported anonymous sources as saying that some people stayed until late into the evening. Covered by Gray investigation; not under investigation by the Metropolitan Police as of 10 February 2022.
- 20 May 2020: Johnson's Principal Private Secretary, Martin Reynolds, invited staff at 10 Downing Street to what the invitation described as "socially distanced drinks". (The full text of the email invitation was, "Hi all, after what has been an incredibly busy period we thought it would be nice to make the most of the lovely weather and have some socially distanced drinks in the No 10 garden this evening. Please join us from 6pm and bring your own booze!") Johnson acknowledged being present for about 25 minutes, but said he thought the event was an allowed work meeting. Also reportedly in attendance were Symonds and Henry Newman, a one-time Conservative councillor in Camden and then aide to Michael Gove. Dominic Cummings said that he and others warned against the event, and that he did not attend. Covered by Gray investigation. FPNs were issued for breaches of Regulation 6 of the Health Protection (Coronavirus, Restrictions) (England) Regulations 2020 – Restriction on leaving, or being outside of, the place where you were living without reasonable excuse.
- 18 June 2020: a gathering in the Cabinet Office, 70 Whitehall on the departure of a No 10 private secretary, Hannah Young, who left to become deputy consul general in New York. The Daily Telegraph alleged 20 people were present, including Reynolds, with alcohol consumed. A number of news sources stated that former deputy cabinet secretary, Helen MacNamara, attended the event, and that she had been issued with, and paid, an FPN. Covered by Gray investigation. FPNs were issued for breaches of Regulation 7 of the Health Protection (Coronavirus, Restrictions) (England) Regulations 2020 – Restriction on participating in an indoor gathering consisting of two or more people.
- 19 June 2020: gatherings related to Boris Johnson's birthday.
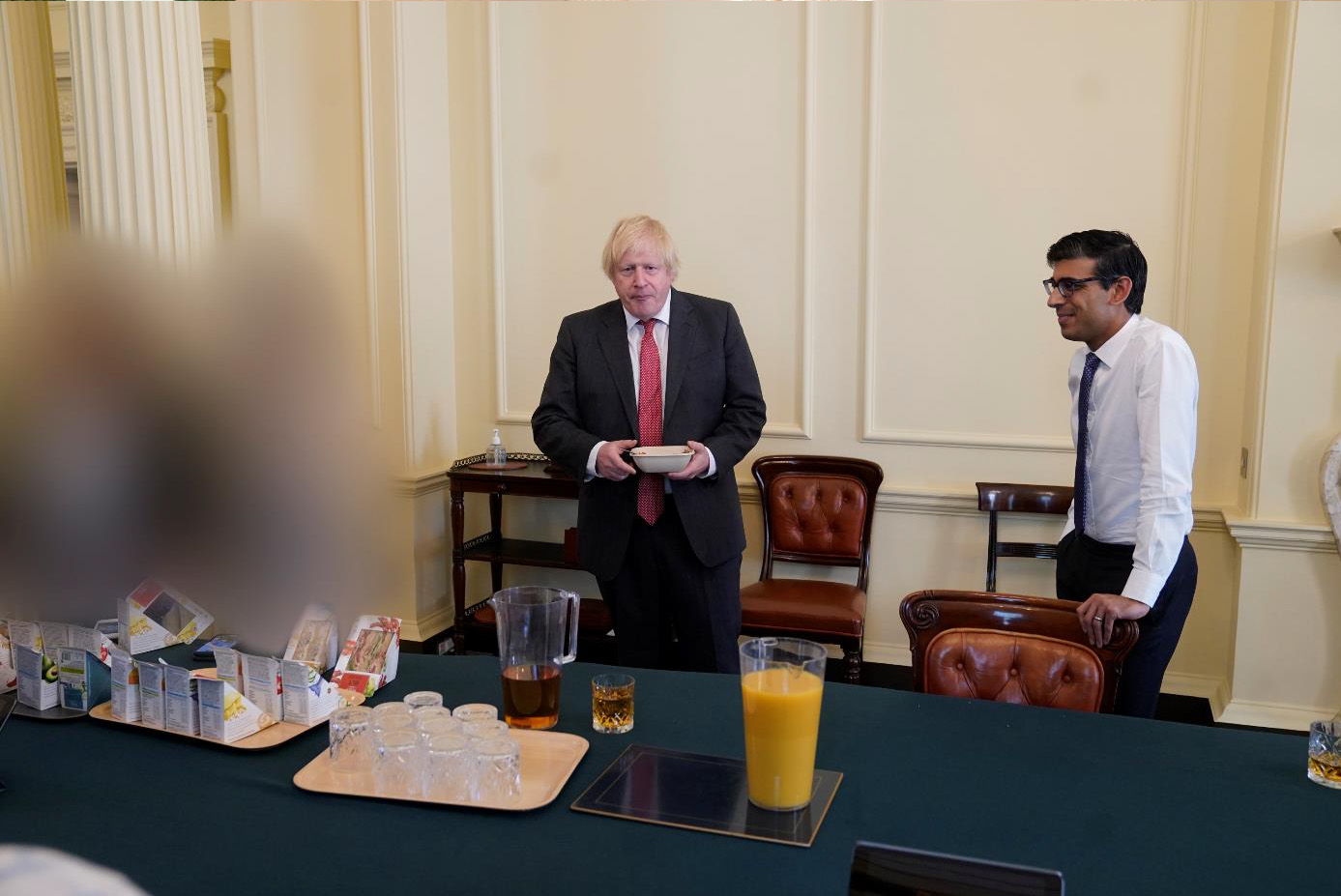
  - Johnson and Rishi Sunak at the former's birthday celebration on 19 June 2020
    A surprise get-together for Johnson's birthday occurred in the Cabinet Room; Downing Street said Johnson attended for less than 10 minutes. Covered by Gray investigation. FPNs were issued for breaches of Regulation 7 of the Health Protection (Coronavirus, Restrictions) (England) Regulations 2020 – Restriction on participating in an indoor gathering consisting of two or more people.
  - There was also a birthday celebration in the evening: Downing Street said that "the Prime Minister hosted a small number of family members outside that evening", as allowed under the rules. Not covered by Gray investigation.
  - ITV News and other media have alleged, based on multiple sources, that family friends gathered later inside, in the Johnsons' flat. Not covered by Gray investigation.

=== Mid-2020 ===
- September 2020: A photo was taken of Carrie Symonds embracing a friend at an engagement party. She admitted to breaching social distancing guidelines and apologised. Not covered by Gray investigation.

=== During second lockdown in England ===
- 13 November 2020: two gatherings on this day were investigated. Labour MP Catherine West in December 2021 asked Johnson in Parliament "will the prime minister tell the House whether there was a party in Downing Street" on this date. He replied, "No – but I'm sure whatever happened, the guidance was followed and the rules were followed at all times".
  - a source told the BBC that staff had impromptu drinks at their desks to mark the leaving of Lee Cain, the prime minister's departing director of communications, and that the gathering was over by 20:30. Johnson attended. It was reported that he visited Cain in his office and gave a farewell speech. Covered by Gray investigation. ITV published photographs purportedly from this gathering. BBC News said they show Johnson toasting colleagues". FPNs were issued for this event. They were for breaches of Regulation 8 of the Health Protection (Coronavirus, Restrictions) (England) (No. 4) Regulations 2020 – Restriction on participating in an indoor gathering consisting of two or more people.
  - multiple sources, including Cummings, said Downing Street staff joined a gathering with the prime minister's then-fiancée, Symonds, in their 11 Downing Street flat, playing loud music including ABBA's "The Winner Takes It All" to celebrate Cummings' departure. A spokesperson for Mrs Johnson denied there was any party. The Telegraph reported that Boris Johnson was also present. The Financial Times wrote that a party in the Johnsons' flat above Number 11 showed classified intelligence documents lying around in the flat. Not fully investigated by Gray investigation; investigated by the Metropolitan Police as of 10 February 2022. The Guardian reported that it appeared the police decided not to issue an FPN to Carrie Johnson over this evening.
- 25 November 2020: Treasury staff were reported as gathering for drinks; The Times reported that around two dozen civil servants attended, but a Treasury spokesperson described an "impromptu" event with a "small number" of staff involved. Not covered by Gray investigation.
- 27 November 2020: it was reported that an informal leaving event for Cleo Watson, a 10 Downing Street aide, was held, and that the prime minister gave a speech. Covered by Gray investigation; not investigated by the Metropolitan Police.

=== With London in Tier 2 ===
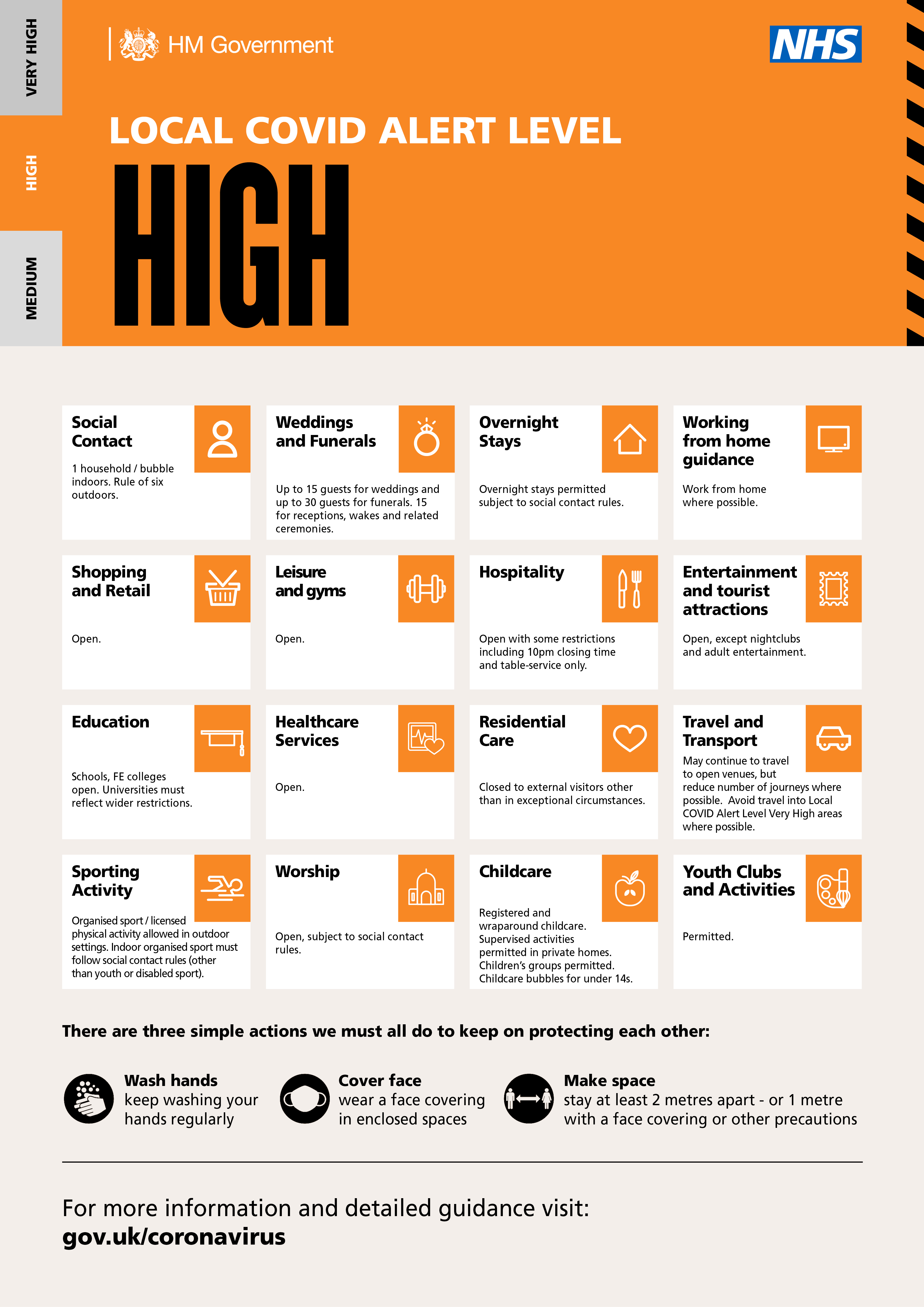
Government poster describing "Tier 2" social distancing rules, that were in place in London between 2 and 15 December 2020.

- 10 December 2020: Christmas party at the Department for Education's café hosted by the Education Secretary, Gavin Williamson and attended by the Permanent Secretary, Susan Acland-Hood; a department spokesman said that "a gathering of colleagues who were already present at the office" had taken place. A spokesperson confirmed that Williamson gave a speech and that "drinks and canapés" were served. Covered by Gray investigation; not under investigation by the Metropolitan Police as of 10 February 2022.
- 14 December 2020: a gathering of about 23 staff members took place in the basement of the Conservative Campaign Headquarters in Westminster. A year later, following the publication of allegations that Covid regulations were breached at the gathering, Conservative politician Shaun Bailey resigned as chair of a police and crime committee of the London Assembly, with a spokesperson saying it was to prevent the "unauthorised social gathering" from distracting from the committee's work. The Conservative Party took disciplinary action against four of their employees for holding a "raucous" event, The police decided in November 2022 that there was not sufficient evidence of the allegation to take any further action over it. Not covered by Gray investigation; video released by the Mirror in June 2023, featuring "Fairytale of New York" playing in the background. Others present included Ben Mallett (a close friend of Carrie Johnson and ran Zac Goldsmith's 2016 London mayoral campaign), Nick Candy (a donor to the Conservative party), Jack Smith (parliamentary aide to the Conservative energy minister Graham Stuart) and Malin Bogue (worked on Johnson's 2019 leadership campaign).
- 15 December 2020: a Christmas quiz took place for 10 Downing Street staff; Johnson took part over a remote connection. A Downing Street spokesperson said the event was all held virtually; other sources said teams were sitting together in a room. Covered by Gray investigation; not initially under investigation by the Metropolitan Police (as of 31 January 2022), but the Metropolitan Police were reviewing this decision in February 2022.

=== With London in Tier 3 ===
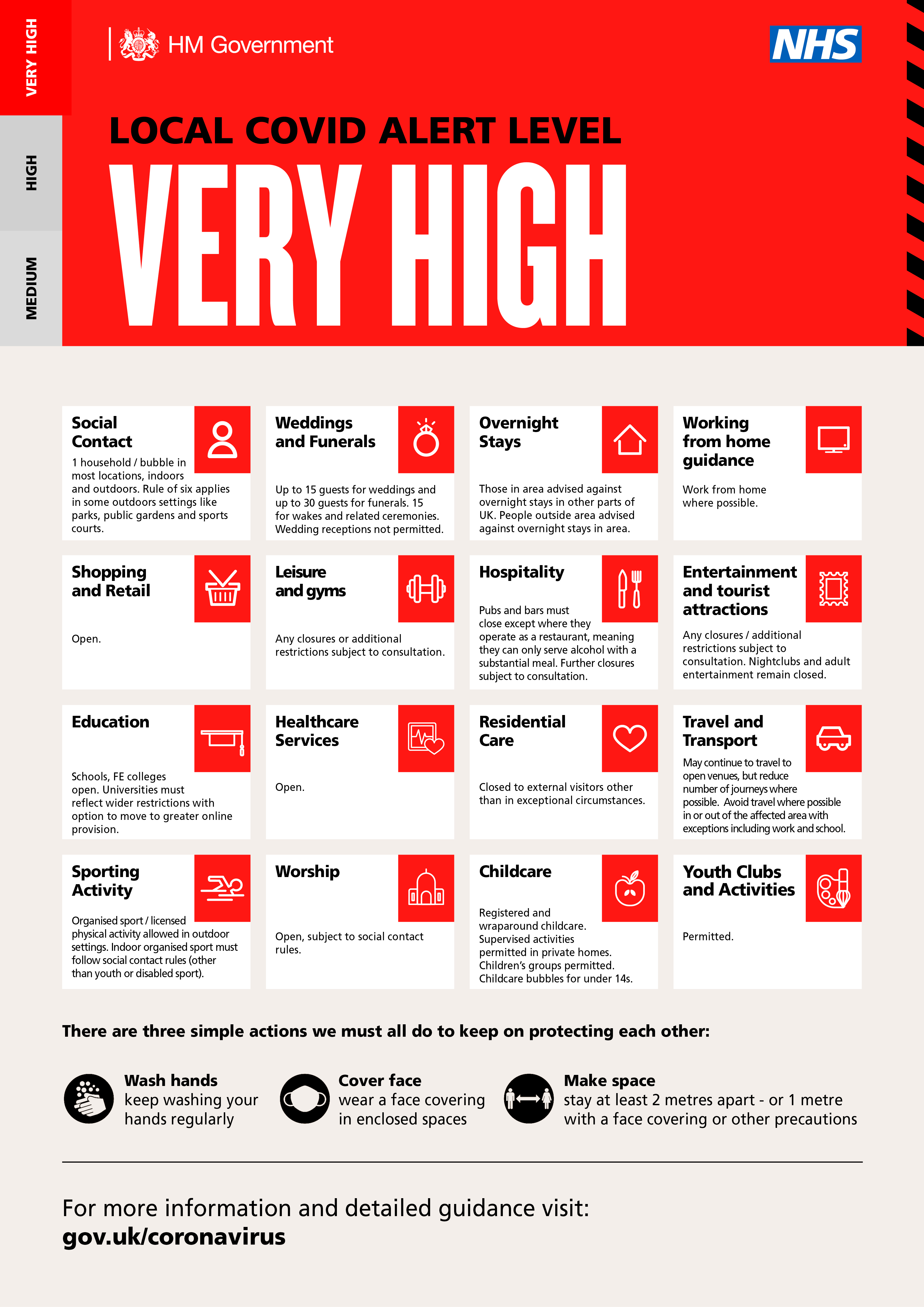
Government poster describing "Tier 3" social distancing rules, that were in place in London between 16 and 19 December 2020.

- 16 December 2020: Christmas party by staff working for Grant Shapps at the Department of Transport; Shapps, who had not been present, apologised for what happened. Not covered by Gray investigation.
- 17 December 2020: Simon Case's team had a Christmas party at 5.30pm in the Cabinet Office, 70 Whitehall. Sky News reported the event was described as a "Christmas party", that it was an hour long, and involved a quiz with the six people who were already in the office and around six more attending virtually. Case did not take part in the event, but walked through the room. Covered by Gray investigation.
- 17 December 2020: Cabinet Office staff gathered with drinks to mark the departure of Kate Josephs, Director General of the COVID Taskforce. Josephs apologised for the event. Paul Scriven, a former Leader of Sheffield City Council, called for Josephs' resignation from her role as chief executive of Sheffield Council. Josephs went on paid leave while her involvement was investigated by a cross-party council committee; their investigation was continuing as of 25 May 2022. Covered by Gray investigation.
- 17 December 2020: an additional gathering at 10 Downing Street is mentioned in Gray's interim update. The Telegraph reported that this was the leaving party for Boris Johnson's defence adviser Captain Steve Higham that had been previously reported as occurring in December. Boris Johnson reportedly attended and spoke. FPNs were issued for breaches of Paragraph 1 of Schedule 3 to the Health Protection (Coronavirus, Restrictions) (All Tiers) (England) Regulations 2020 – Restriction on participating in an indoor gathering in the Tier 3 area consisting of two or more people.
- 18 December 2020: Christmas gathering at 10 Downing Street, with music. Sky News described allegations of this being a "cheese and wine night", with sources saying around 40 people were present in an enclosed space, and that it continued until 2am. During the event, a security alarm was accidentally pressed, leading to a Downing Street custodian arriving, who expressed unhappiness with what was going on. A Metropolitan Police officer subsequently also arrived to investigate the alarm. Gathering covered by Gray investigation. FPNs were issued for breaches of Paragraph 1 of Schedule 3 to the Health Protection (Coronavirus, Restrictions) (All Tiers) (England) Regulations 2020 – Restriction on participating in an indoor gathering in the Tier 3 area consisting of two or more people.

=== During third lockdown in England ===
- 14 January 2021: A gathering in 10 Downing Street on the departure of two private secretaries. The Guardian reported sources saying some attending drank prosecco, and that Boris Johnson gave a speech and stayed for about 5 minutes. Downing Street declined to comment on the matter. Covered by Gray investigation. FPNs were issued for breaches of Paragraph 3 of Schedule 3A to the Health Protection (Coronavirus, Restrictions) (All Tiers) (England) Regulations 2020 – Restriction on participating in an indoor gathering in the Tier 4 area consisting of two or more people.
- 16 April 2021: there were two leaving events (one for James Slack, Boris Johnson's director of communications; one for a personal photographer to Johnson) in different parts of Downing Street, which later merged into one, with about 30 people present. Johnson was not in London at the time. Slack (now deputy editor of The Sun) apologised for the event on 14 January 2022. Both parties took place on the evening before the funeral of Prince Philip on 17 April 2021, and featured alcohol and one of them featured loud music. The Daily Telegraph reported partying continued from 6pm until 1am. A child's swing in the garden was broken. ITV News reported dancing and at least two couples "getting it on with each other" and "touching each other up", while two other members of staff who were not openly a couple previously were "all over each other". Both gatherings were covered by the Cabinet Office investigation. FPNs were issued for breaches of Paragraph 2 of Schedule 2 to the Health Protection (Coronavirus, Restrictions) (Steps) (England) Regulations 2021 – Restriction on participating in an outdoor gathering in the Step 2 area consisting of more than six people.

== Investigations ==
=== Cabinet Office inquiry ===
==== Simon Case ====
At Prime Minister's Questions on 8 December, Prime Minister Boris Johnson apologised for the video of the mock press conference, describing himself as "furious" about it, but maintained that, as far as he knew from senior staff, a party had not taken place. He also said that he had commissioned an investigation into whether any rules had been broken, to be undertaken by Cabinet Secretary Simon Case. On 9 December, it was announced that the inquiry led by Simon Case would focus on three events, two at 10 Downing Street on 27 November and 18 December 2020, and one at the Department for Education on 10 December 2020.

On 17 December 2021, it was announced that Case would no longer lead the inquiry following reports that a party had been held in his own office on 17 December 2020.

==== Sue Gray ====
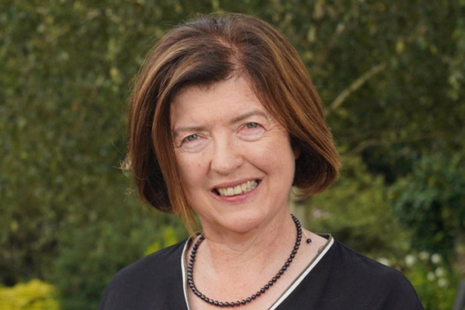
Sue Gray, the civil servant who undertook the inquiry

The inquiry was taken over by senior civil servant Sue Gray, Second Permanent Secretary in the Cabinet Office. Lord Barwell, former Conservative MP and chief of staff for Theresa May when she was the prime minister, said, "he could not think of a better person for the role". Opposition politicians, Labour MP Chris Bryant and SNP MP Ian Blackford, called for the inquiry to be led by a person independent of the government and civil service. Alex Thomas, the civil service programme director at the Institute for Government, said that Gray, as a civil servant, is not independent of government.

In January 2022, ITV reported that Gray's investigation would also cover the 15 May 2020 photo and Dominic Cummings' allegations of parties on 20 May and 13 November 2020.

Gray interviewed over 70 individuals. Gray had reportedly questioned Johnson, by 17 January, about events and also Cummings, who insisted on only answering in written form. Gray also had access to swipe card and other security data on people's movements in and out of 10 Downing Street, and has talked to police officers who were on duty, whose evidence was described by one source as "extremely damning". Sky News reported that Gray had received photos showing Johnson attending events with alcohol.

Gray's report was initially expected in the week beginning 24 January 2022. Labour and the Liberal Democrats asked for all accompanying evidence, including emails and witness accounts, to be published. Deputy Prime Minister Dominic Raab would not confirm that Gray's report would be published in full, and said that Johnson would decide how much detail would be released publicly.

==== Investigation update ====
The Metropolitan Police asked Gray to omit key details from her report of events they were investigating, to avoid any prejudice to their investigation. They later explained that this was so they could collect independent accounts from individuals questioned. As a result, there was uncertainty over when, or even whether, Gray's report would be published. Instead of publishing her report, an eleven-page update was delivered first to Johnson and then published later on 31 January 2022. Johnson then made a statement to the Commons.

The update provided a list of 16 gatherings, including some that had not been previously reported in the media, and said that 12 were under investigation by the Metropolitan Police. Of the 12 under investigation, Gray said that she was "extremely limited in what I can say about those events and it is not possible at present to provide a meaningful report setting out and analysing the extensive factual information I have been able to gather". She had decided not to describe the other four dates, writing, "I do not feel that I am able to do so without detriment to the overall balance of the findings".

The update concluded that at least some of the gatherings examined did not meet the standards expected of the public at the time. She wrote, "A number of these gatherings should not have been allowed to take place or to develop in the way that they did". It was critical of No 10 and the Cabinet Office, including over the consumption of alcohol and how some staff felt unable to raise concerns. Gray recommended the government address learnings of the update "immediately", rather than wait for the police investigation to conclude.

General findings

i. Against the backdrop of the pandemic, when the Government was asking citizens to accept far-reaching restrictions on their lives, some of the behaviour surrounding these gatherings is difficult to justify.

ii. At least some of the gatherings in question represent a serious failure to observe not just the high standards expected of those working at the heart of Government but also of the standards expected of the entire British population at the time.

iii. At times it seems there was too little thought given to what was happening across the country in considering the appropriateness of some of these gatherings, the risks they presented to public health and how they might appear to the public. There were failures of leadership and judgment by different parts of No 10 and the Cabinet Office at different times. Some of the events should not have been allowed to take place. Other events should not have been allowed to develop as they did.

iv. The excessive consumption of alcohol is not appropriate in a professional workplace at any time. Steps must be taken to ensure that every Government Department has a clear and robust policy in place covering the consumption of alcohol in the workplace.

v. The use of the garden at No 10 Downing Street should be primarily for the Prime Minister and the private residents of No 10 and No 11 Downing Street. During the pandemic it was often used as an extension of the workplace as a more covid secure means of holding group meetings in a ventilated space. This was a sensible measure that staff appreciated, but the garden was also used for gatherings without clear authorisation or oversight. This was not appropriate. Any official access to the space, including for meetings, should be by invitation only and in a controlled environment.

vi. Some staff wanted to raise concerns about behaviours they witnessed at work but at times felt unable to do so. No member of staff should feel unable to report or challenge poor conduct where they witness it. There should be easier ways for staff to raise such concerns informally, outside of the line management chain.

vii. The number of staff working in No 10 Downing Street has steadily increased in recent years. In terms of size, scale and range of responsibility it is now more akin to a small Government Department than purely a dedicated Prime Minister's office. The structures that support the smooth operation of Downing Street, however, have not evolved sufficiently to meet the demands of this expansion. The leadership structures are fragmented and complicated and this has sometimes led to the blurring of lines of accountability. Too much responsibility and expectation is placed on the senior official whose principal function is the direct support of the Prime Minister. This should be addressed as a matter of priority.

— Sue Gray, "Investigation into alleged gatherings on government premises during Covid restrictions: Update"

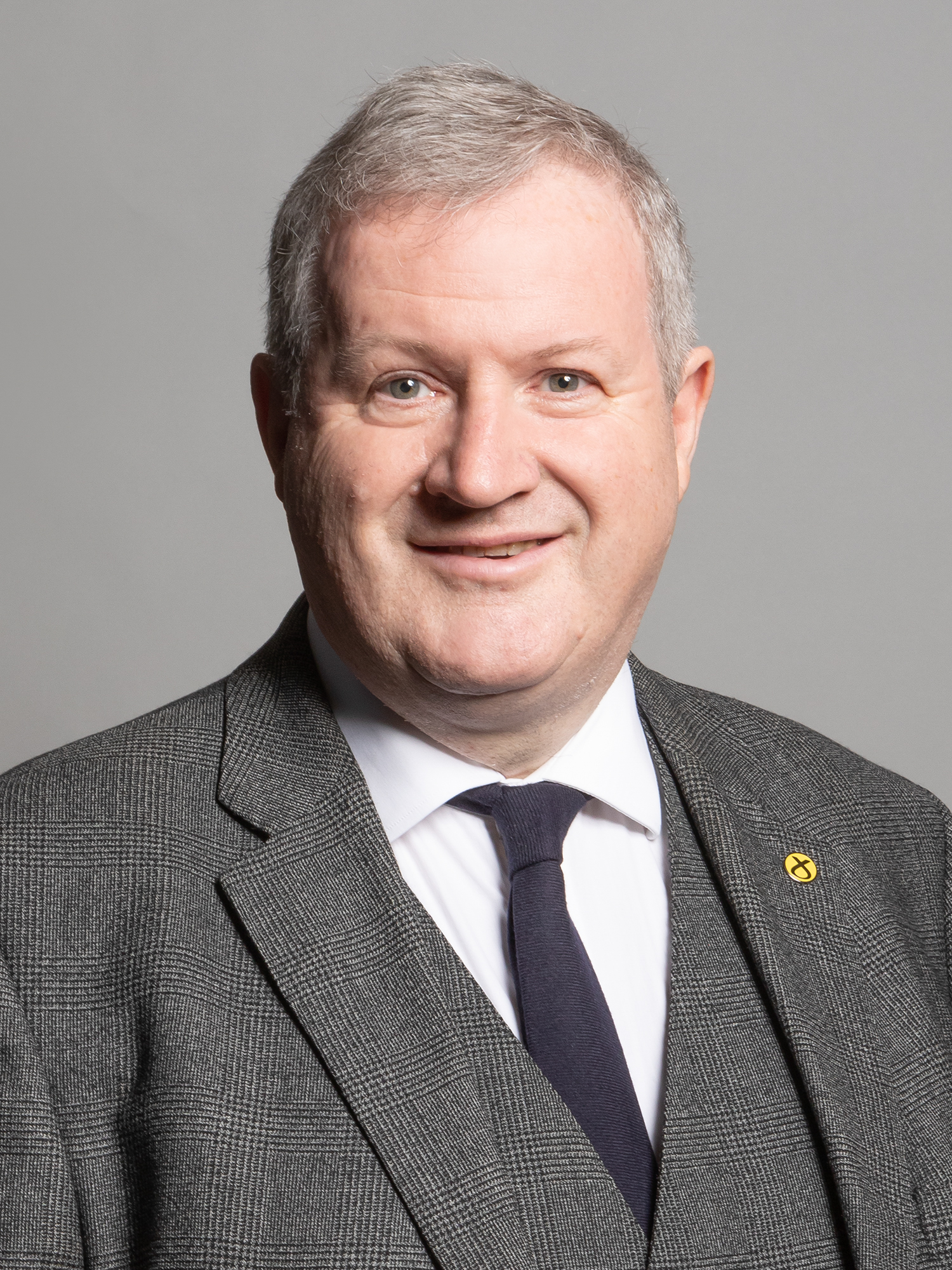
SNP MP Ian Blackford was ordered to withdraw from the House of Commons after he repeatedly stated that Johnson had misled the House.

In response, Johnson said he would create a new Office of the Prime Minister, review the Civil Service code of conduct, and bring in other measures. In the ensuing Commons debate, SNP MP Ian Blackford was ordered to withdraw from the House of Commons for the remainder of the sitting day, by the Speaker, Lindsay Hoyle, after he repeatedly stated that Johnson had misled the House and refused to qualify his remarks to state that the misleading was "inadvertent".

==== Alleged lobbying before the final report was published ====
On 20 May 2022, Sky News reported that, some time before 21 April, Gray had a meeting with Johnson. There was initial confusion as to who asked for the meeting, with Conservative sources saying Gray called the meeting and Gray's sources saying Downing Street had. Later, BBC News said that the original idea came from Downing Street, and Gray then sent the calendar invite for the meeting. It is not clear what was discussed. It was reported that a senior government source said they had talked about whether to include photographs in the report; this was disputed by a spokesperson for Gray. The Times reported two Whitehall sources saying Johnson suggested that Gray abandon plans to publish her report given the police investigation into events.

Downing Street also said that Johnson and Gray had had a previous meeting around the time her interim report was released.

The Guardian reported allegations that senior civil servants lobbied Gray to leave out some names and some details of the report and that Gray insisted she would not do so unless issued with an instruction.

The Times said that partial drafts of the final report were circulating at Number 10 the day before publication and that three senior civil servants, including Case, lobbied for changes. One alleged change reported by The Times was the removal of details of the 13 November 2020 gathering in the Johnsons' flat. Downing Street denied this. Asked whether Number 10 had in any way influenced the report, Northern Ireland Secretary Brandon Lewis said he was "absolutely confident" that was not the case.

==== Final report ====
The police announced that their investigation had been completed on 19 May 2022, and Gray's final report was expected to follow soon after. Individuals named in the report were given the opportunity to raise an objection, with the deadline to do that set as 5 pm on 22 May.

The final report was published and delivered to the prime minister on 25 May 2022. The 60-page report of the investigation covered 16 different events which occurred on 12 different dates between May 2020 and April 2021. Each of these events occurred whilst Covid lockdown regulations were in force and involved gatherings of people. Eight of the events were attended by the prime minister. The investigation found that many of the events breached Covid regulations, and that multiple breaches of the regulations had occurred. It was also found that there were repeated instances of staff "flouting" the regulations and the investigation gave an extremely critical assessment of the drinking culture in Downing Street, and that several of the events appeared notably drunken and rowdy, and that some went on into the early hours. Gray said she was disappointed that some of the events may never have been known about if they had not been reported by the media.

The culture and leadership in Downing Street was criticised, and it said senior leadership must bear responsibility for it. There was said to be a failure of leadership and judgment in No 10 and the Cabinet Office, with some of the events being attended by leaders, and many of which should not have been allowed to happen. It said that the officials organising events knew that what they were doing was wrong, and that they renamed events to make them sound less like parties. Staff emails and messages were analysed and showed regular planning of social events, some officials trying to warn that events were a bad idea, a warning sent that bring-your-own-booze garden event could be a "comms risk", and a Reynold's email that said he "got away" with the bring-your-own-booze event.

The lack of respect for security staff and cleaners was also a concern as they were often treated in an unacceptable way, with Downing Street staff routinely being rude to them. Some said they were fearful of raising concerns, and junior staff thought it was reasonable to attend events as bosses seemed to be condoning them. It said too that Gray was "encouraged" that there had already been changes made to simplify the process of raising directly with the permanent secretary.

Conclusions The general findings set out in my update of 31st January 2022 still stand.

Whatever the initial intent, what took place at many of these gatherings and the way in which they developed was not in line with Covid guidance at the time. Even allowing for the extraordinary pressures officials and advisers were under, the factual findings of this report illustrate some attitudes and behaviours inconsistent with that guidance. It is also clear, from the outcome of the police investigation, that a large number of individuals (83) who attended these events breached Covid regulations and therefore Covid guidance.

I have already commented in my update on what I found to be failures of leadership and judgment in No 10 and the Cabinet Office. The events that I investigated were attended by leaders in government. Many of these events should not have been allowed to happen. It is also the case that some of the more junior civil servants believed that their involvement in some of these events was permitted given the attendance of senior leaders. The senior leadership at the centre, both political and official, must bear responsibility for this culture.

In my update I made a number of general limited findings, I am pleased progress is being made in addressing the issues I raised. I commented on the fragmentary and complicated leadership structures in No 10. Since my update there have been changes to the organisation and management of Downing Street and the Cabinet Office with the aim of creating clearer lines of leadership and accountability and now these need the chance and time to bed in.

I found that some staff had witnessed or been subjected to behaviours at work which they had felt concerned about but at times felt unable to raise properly. I was made aware of multiple examples of a lack of respect and poor treatment of security and cleaning staff. This was unacceptable. I am reassured to see that steps have since been taken to introduce more easily accessible means by which to raise concerns electronically, in person or online, including directly with the Permanent Secretary in No 10. I hope that this will truly embed a culture that welcomes and creates opportunities for challenge and speaking up at all levels.

I also made a recommendation that steps should be taken to ensure that every Government Department has a clear and robust policy in place covering the consumption of alcohol in the workplace. Since then guidance has been issued to all Government Departments.

The matter of what disciplinary action should now take place is outside of the scope of this report and is for others to consider. Nothing set out in this report can be taken as constituting a disciplinary investigation or findings of fact appropriate for such a purpose. However, I do offer a reflection: while there is no excuse for some of the behaviour set out here it is important to acknowledge that those in the most junior positions attended gatherings at which their seniors were present, or indeed organised. I have no doubt that they will have taken the learning from this experience and, while this is not a matter for me, I hope this will be taken into account in considering any disciplinary action.

Many will be dismayed that behaviour of this kind took place on this scale at the heart of Government. The public have a right to expect the very highest standards of behaviour in such places and clearly what happened fell well short of this. It is my firm belief, however, that these events did not reflect the prevailing culture in Government and the Civil Service at the time. Many thousands of people up and down the country worked tirelessly to deliver in unprecedented times. I remain immensely proud to be a civil servant and of the work of the service and the wider public sector during the pandemic.

— Sue Gray, "Findings of Second Permanent Secretary's Investigation into Alleged Gatherings on Government Premises During Covid Restrictions"

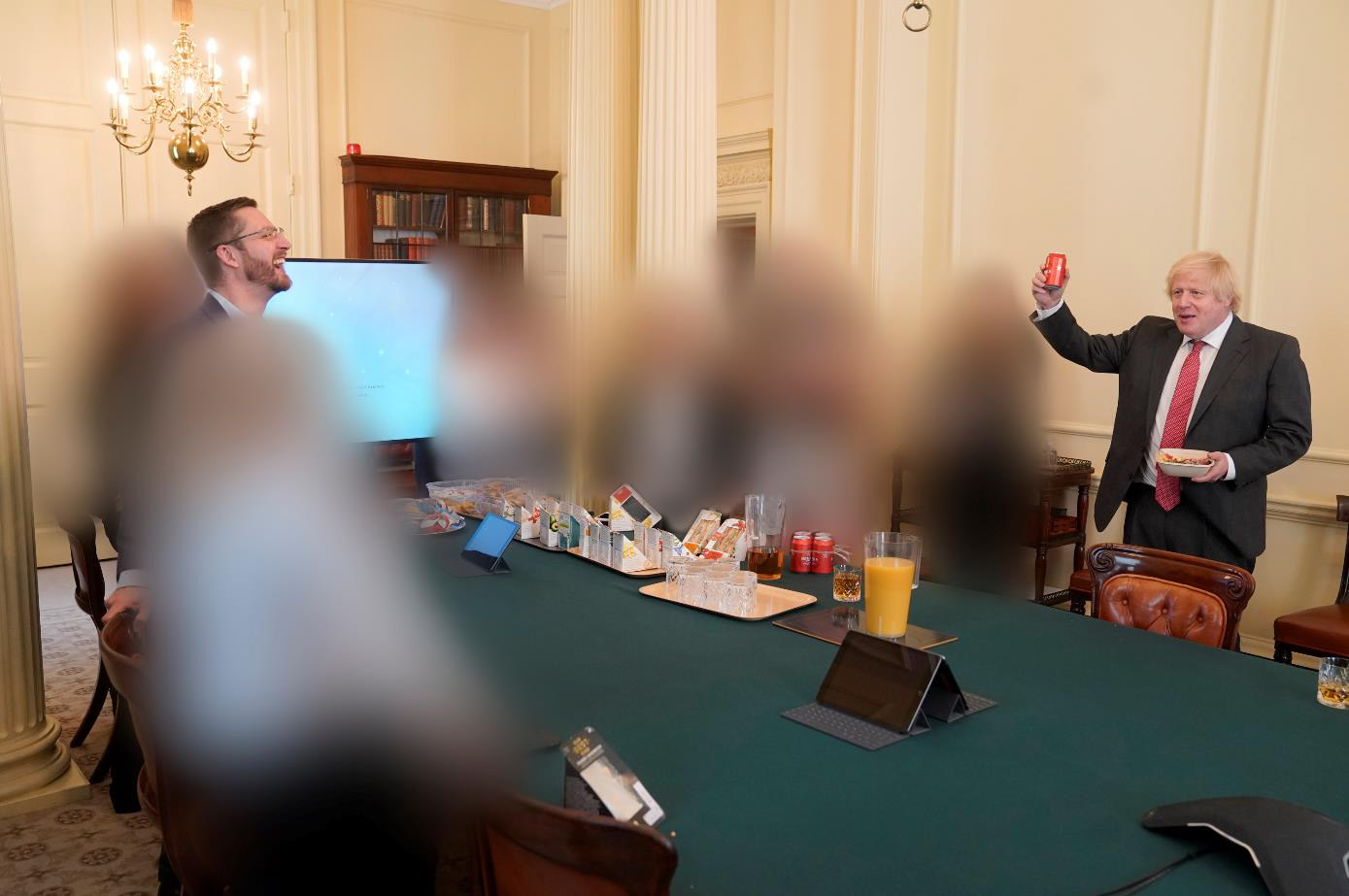
An image of the 19 June 2020 gathering in the Cabinet Room in No 10 Downing Street on the Prime Minister's birthday, taken from Gray's final report

The report included a few photographs of the gathering. There were eight covering two of the events: the prime minister's birthday event in June 2020, and a leaving event in November 2020. More than 300 photographs had been submitted.

The names of only 15 of the attendees were given, the rest remained anonymous. Gray explained that she decided to name only the most senior staff, those "who knew about and/or attended an event" or were involved in the organisation of one, adding that was "given their wider responsibility for the leadership and culture of the departments, subject to some limited exceptions based on personal circumstances". Boris Johnson, the prime minister was named, as were senior officials Simon Case, and Martin Reynolds who, it was said, appeared to be particularly involved in planning events. Dominic Cummings was also said to have been at at least one event, but it was said that evidence to back his claims that he warned against them could not be found.

Gray chose not to investigate allegations of a party in flat on 13 November 2020, and did not fully investigate that "ABBA party".

Each of the events covered was individually described, and details of the regulations in force at the time, what happened and who attended was also given. At a socially-distanced drinks event on 20 May 2020, staff were warned not to "wave around" bottles of wine. At a leaving event on 18 June 2020, there was karaoke, there was pizza and prosecco, there was excessive alcohol consumption, someone vomited, there was a minor altercation, staff stayed beyond 3am and the cabinet secretary allowed his office to be used for this event. There were two leaving events on 14 April 2021 which merged in the No 10 garden, with drunkenness and people leaving after 4am. With an event on 16 April, the last person left at 4:20am. At the 15 December Christmas quiz, staff were told to leave by back door because of drunkenness. At a Christmas party in December 2020, red wine was spilt on a wall and on stationery supplies, and at a 18 December 2020 event, a panic button was triggered and police turned up.

=== Police investigation ===
A police inquiry, called Operation Hillman, was started into 12 gatherings on eight different days, seven of which Boris Johnson was alleged to have attended. As of 10 February 2022, the inquiry was led by Commander Catherine Roper.

On 24 January 2022, the Metropolitan Police contacted the Cabinet Office asking for all relevant information from the Gray inquiry. On 25 January they announced the launch of their investigation into potential breaches of COVID regulations in Whitehall and Downing Street during the pandemic. Cressida Dick, the Metropolitan Police Commissioner, said though they would not normally investigate breaches so far back, such investigations happened where there was evidence of "serious and flagrant breach" of regulations. The threshold criteria were "that those involved knew or ought to have known that what they were doing was an offence;" that "not investigating would significantly undermine the legitimacy of the law", and "there was little ambiguity around the absence of any reasonable defence". Sky News reported that the Metropolitan Police did not object to Gray's inquiry being released before its investigation and that Gray was in communication with the police. The police investigation had more than 500 pages of documents and more than 300 images.

On 31 January, it was announced that the police were not planning to name anyone given an FPN in relation to their investigation. The police said they would announce the total number of penalties issued and what they were issued for. After some initial confusion, the Government said it would publish "everything we can", including if Johnson or the Cabinet Secretary was given one.

In early February, the police said they would email a questionnaire to up to 90 people alleged to have been present at events, including Johnson and also, it was expected, his wife Carrie. Rishi Sunak, Simon Case and Martin Reynolds were also sent questionnaires. On 11 February 2022, 10 Downing Street confirmed that Johnson had received a questionnaire, which must be responded to within seven days. The police said it asked what happened and "must be answered truthfully". Such questionnaires have the same status as information given in an interview under caution. Johnson was thus the first British Prime Minister to have been asked questions under caution. Questions included:

- "Did you participate in a gathering on a specific date?"
- "What was the purpose of your participation in that gathering?"
- "Did you interact with, or undertake any activity with, other persons present at the gathering? If yes, please provide details".
- "What, if any, lawful exception applied to the gathering and/or what reasonable excuse did you have for participating in the gathering?"

Also covered was what times someone attended an event and how many others were present.

Gray made her interview notes with staff available to those sent questionnaires by the police.

On 21 March 2022, the police announced that they had sent out more than 100 questionnaires and had started to interview witnesses.

On 21 April 2022, it was reported that the police would not provide any further updates on their investigation until after 5 May. This was because local elections were due on that date and guidance from the National Police Chiefs' Council to avoid communications that might influence the outcome of elections. On 23 April 2022, however, it was announced that further FPNs had been issued to some of those who had attended the drinks party in the Downing Street garden in May 2020. Johnson was not among those receiving one. More questionnaires were sent out in early May 2022.

On 19 May 2022, the police said that they had completed their investigations and concluded that offences were committed on 8 dates. The investigation involved 12 detectives, 345 documents (including emails, door logs, diary entries and witness statements), 510 photographs or CCTV images, and 204 questionnaires. The cost of the enquiry was £460,000.

==== Fixed penalty notices ====
On 29 March 2022, the police said that they were to refer 20 FPNs for £50 to the ACRO Criminal Records Office, which administers the process and collects any penalties. As an individual might receive more than one notice, it was not known how many people were affected. Recipients of such notices had 28 days in which to either pay or contest the notice. If contested, the case would then be reviewed and either the notice is withdrawn or the case is referred to the courts. Payment of the penalty does not constitute an admission of guilt. In response to the FPNs, Dominic Raab, the deputy prime minister, said it was clear that the law had been broken and said that Johnson "accepts responsibility" for what happened. On 30 March, Johnson in Parliament, and his spokesperson to the press, repeatedly declined to agree that laws had been broken.

On 4 April 2022, further details about the first batch of notices was reported, for a gathering on 16 April 2021, a leaving party for the former No 10 director of communications James Slack. The Daily Telegraph reported that former Director General for Propriety and Ethics in the Cabinet Office and former Deputy Cabinet Secretary Helen MacNamara was a recipient of one. They said MacNamara attended a leaving do in June 2020 in the Cabinet Office. Allegedly, roughly 20 people were there and alcohol was drunk. MacNamara said she "accepted and paid the fixed penalty notice ... I am sorry for the error of judgement I have shown". BBC News reported that Johnson would not comment on whether laws had been broken. They also reported Dominic Raab as having said earlier that he thought it was clear that the law had been broken, and that Johnson 'accepts responsibility' for what happened. The Independent stated: "However, Downing Street continues to refuse to accept the law had been broken, despite the Met issuing 20 FPNs".

On 12 April 2022, the police made at least 30 more referrals to the ACRO Criminal Records Office for FPNs for breaches of COVID-19 regulations. Downing Street later confirmed that Johnson, his wife and Sunak would be receiving FPNs, who all apologised and paid the penalties. A spokesperson for Carrie Johnson said that she, "accepts the Met Police's findings and apologises unreservedly." Sunak said he respected the police's decision. ITV News later reported that some of Sunak's junior aides at the time suggested he should resign in order to challenge Johnson's leadership, but he chose not to. The Telegraph reported that Sunak did plan to resign, but was persuaded not to by newspaper executives.

Matt Fowler of Covid-19 Bereaved Families for Justice said: "It's plain as day that there was a culture of boozing and rule breaching at the highest level of government, whilst the British public was making unimaginable sacrifices to protect their loved ones and communities". Keir Starmer said: "Boris Johnson and Rishi Sunak have broken the law and repeatedly lied to the British public. They must both resign". Ed Davey suggested that parliament be recalled to hold a vote of no confidence in Johnson.

On 19 April 2022, in his first Commons statement since being issued with an FPN for being at a gathering in Downing Street on his birthday in 2020, Johnson apologised, adding: "It did not occur to me then or subsequently that a gathering in the Cabinet Room just before a vital meeting on Covid strategy could amount to a breach of the rules". Before the apology was made, Starmer alleged Johnson was using the Russian invasion of Ukraine as a "shield" to stay in office and said that he found it "pretty offensive". After labelling the apology as "a joke", and saying the Prime Minister had been "dishonest", Starmer withdrew the remark after being admonished by the Speaker, Lindsay Hoyle, who found him in breach of the rule that prohibits MPs from accusing each other of dishonesty during debates.

On 12 May 2022, the Metropolitan Police announced that they had now issued more than 100 FPNs in relation to parties at Downing Street and Whitehall. New FPNs are thought to relate, in part, to the 18 December 2020 Christmas party. BBC reporting believes FPNs have only so far been in connection with four out of the twelve events being investigated by the police.

On 19 May 2022, the police said they had finished their investigation and had issued or were in the process of issuing a total of 126 FPNs to 83 people. This included 28 people who received between two and five FPNs. Neither Boris nor Carrie Johnson were issued with any further FPNs. Simon Case did not receive an FPN. It was later reported that Steve Higham was also "said to have been issued" with one. 53 FPNs were issued to men and 73 to women. This made Downing Street the address with the most COVID-19 regulation penalties in the country. FPNs were issued for the following offences:

- Regulation 6 of the Health Protection (Coronavirus, Restrictions) (England) Regulations 2020 – Restriction on leaving, or being outside of, the place where you were living without reasonable excuse.
- Regulation 7 of the Health Protection (Coronavirus, Restrictions) (England) Regulations 2020 – Restriction on participating in an indoor gathering consisting of two or more people.
- Regulation 8 of the Health Protection (Coronavirus, Restrictions) (England) (No. 4) Regulations 2020 – Restriction on participating in an indoor gathering consisting of two or more people.
- Paragraph 1 of Schedule 3 to the Health Protection (Coronavirus, Restrictions) (All Tiers) (England) Regulations 2020 – Restriction on participating in an indoor gathering in the Tier 3 area consisting of two or more people.
- Paragraph 3 of Schedule 3A to the Health Protection (Coronavirus, Restrictions) (All Tiers) (England) Regulations 2020 – Restriction on participating in an indoor gathering in the Tier 4 area consisting of two or more people.
- Paragraph 2 of Schedule 2 to the Health Protection (Coronavirus, Restrictions) (Steps) (England) Regulations 2021 - Restriction on participating in an outdoor gathering in the Step 2 area consisting of more than six people.

There was media speculation about why some individuals were issued an FPN for certain events and others were not. Pippa Crerar reported that Simon Case was not issued one even though he was at events where others were because he was not captured in any pictures, and she speculated that police may have required photographic evidence as their threshold before issuing an FPN. However, an ITV report said there were photographs of Case at the 19 June 2020 gathering, with one report even saying Case was "perplexed" as to why he had not received a penalty. The Guardian quoted a senior civil servant who said that many were issued FPNs because they admitted to Gray that they were at events, and Gray had handed their names to the police. However, the police did not then establish who else was at these events, including very senior individuals. While 83 people were issued with FPNs, the source said over 300 were present at the various gatherings. This had left junior staff who had confessed to Gray angry. Barrister Adam Wagner suggested that Johnson might not have been issued one for the 20 May 2020 event because the regulations only sanctioned attendees not hosts of garden parties until the rule was changed on 31 May 2020.

==== Scrutiny of the investigation ====
On 24 May 2022, Sadiq Khan – who oversees the Metropolitan Police as Mayor of London – asked for a "detailed explanation" from them of how FPNs were decided in the investigation. Khan said he feared a "lack of clarity" could erode "trust" in the police. Specifically, Khan wanted to know why Johnson was not issued with an FPN over Lee Cain's leaving party, after ITV News obtained photos of him raising a toast in Cain's honour. On 25 May, legal action was started against the Metropolitan Police by Brian Paddick. Lawyers for Paddick wrote in a letter they want to judicially review the "apparent failure of the Metropolitan police service to adequately investigate or investigate at all the prime minister Boris Johnson's participation in three unlawful gatherings held at 10 Downing Street". It is believed Johnson did not even receive a questionnaire over his presence at three leaving parties. The letter states: "We do not understand the decision to investigate some attendees but not the prime minister. ... The MPS can not reasonably have reached any conclusion as to reasonable excuse without first having investigated the prime minister's conduct by way of a questionnaire or interview." Johnson attended several events for which he was not issued with an FPN but other attendees were.

On 26 May 2022, Stephen House, the acting commissioner of the Metropolitan Police, appeared before the London Assembly's Police and Crime Committee to answer questions related to the police's handling of its investigation and how it decided who should be issued with FPNs. He told the committee that he was confident with the findings of the investigation and that he had been personally involved in the decision-making, and is "not particularly concerned about what the prime minister thinks, I do my job without fear or favour". Asked why the prime minister had only received one FPN, House answered that there was no clear evidence of any other breaches by him. House was also asked why the police officer on duty in Downing Street had not challenged the "large number of people" that Gray's report said he had seen, after responding to a panic alarm, in a "crowded and noisy" event where "some members of staff drank excessively". He replied that Downing Street officers were not there to "police what goes on inside the building", but for security purposes, and that he did not "believe that the officer that we're talking about felt that they were seeing something that necessarily breached coronavirus regulations". House also told the committee how the police had handled the investigation, describing how officers had examined the activity of each individual at each event, including how long the event was and how long the individual was at it, and referencing "hundreds of documents, including emails, electronic door logs, diary entries, witness statements, photographs, CCTV images, and we sent questionnaires to people who we felt may have breached legislation".

Following legal action, on 25 July 2022, the Metropolitan Police confirmed that Johnson had not received questionnaires in relation to some of the lockdown gatherings.

=== Privileges Committee investigation ===
On 19 April 2022, Speaker Hoyle approved an application, from the Labour leader and other leading opposition MPs, (Note: The motion was in the name of the following MPs: Keir Starmer, leader of the Labour Party; Ian Blackford, Commons leader of the SNP; Ed Davey, leader of the Liberal Democrats; Liz Saville Roberts, Commons leader of Plaid Cymru; Colum Eastwood, leader of the SDLP; Caroline Lucas, Green Party; Stephen Farry, deputy leader of the Alliance Party) to table a motion for debate and vote on 21 April, on whether Johnson should be referred to the Parliamentary Privileges Committee to investigate whether he knowingly misled Parliament. The motion was tabled on 21 April 2022, with Conservative MPs told not to oppose it. The Commons approved the motion without a vote.

The committee began its considerations on 29 June 2022. On 3 March 2023, the committee published its summary of issues to be raised with Johnson. It raised at least four occasions on which the Commons might have been misled when Johnson said regulations were followed, and suggested that breaches of COVID-19 guidance would have been obvious to Johnson. Johnson submitted a response, which was published 21 March 2023. Johnson faced questioning by the committee at a televised hearing on 22 March 2023.

The Committee sent Johnson their provisional report, ahead of its public release, on 8 June 2023. The next day, Johnson resigned as an MP, critical of the investigation and insisting he had not lied. The final report was released on 15 June 2023 and Johnson condemned it as a "protracted political assassination". It concluded Johnson was guilty of deliberately misleading Parliament and further contempt of Parliament. It stated that, were he still an MP, they would be recommending a 90-day suspension. Johnson called the committee "beneath contempt" and dismissed their findings as "complete tripe". Former minister Michael Heseltine accused Johnson of telling "a pack of lies".

The Committee concluded that Johnson's actions were "more serious" because they were committed when he was Prime Minister. They noted that there was no precedent for a PM being found to have deliberately misled Parliament. The report stated that Johnson tried to "rewrite the meaning" of COVID rules "to fit his own evidence" for example that "a leaving gathering or a gathering to boost morale was a lawful reason to hold a gathering." They concluded he was guilty of further contempts of Parliament and that he breached confidentiality requirements by criticising the committee's provisional findings when he resigned. They said he was complicit in a "campaign of abuse" against those investigating him. The Commons debated the report on 19 June 2023,. The same day, House of Commons MPs held a free vote which saw MPs vote 354 to 7 to accept both the report's findings and its recommendation to revoke Johnson parliament's pass which gave him special parliament access. Eight cabinet ministers, including Commons Leader Penny Mordaunt, Justice Secretary Alex Chalk, Education Secretary Gillian Keegan and Chief Whip Simon Hart backed the report, as did former Prime Minister Theresa May.

== Reactions ==
Since early December 2021, some British media referred to the controversy over the events as "Partygate". The term is similar to that used for previous political scandals and controversies.

Some commentators made comparisons between these possible social gatherings and the lack of social contact when observing COVID restrictions when people were dying or at funerals. For example, at Prime Minister's Questions on 8 December 2021, Keir Starmer, the leader of the Opposition, raised the example of Trisha Greenhalgh being unable to visit her dying mother in December 2020. The Conservative backbench MP Tracey Crouch said: "My constituents have every right to be angry. Their memories of lost loved ones are traumatised knowing that they died alone, first and last Christmases passed by, and many spent what is usually a special day by themselves".

On 7 December, the story became the subject of political satire by Ant & Dec on the ITV entertainment show I'm a Celebrity...Get Me Out of Here! A clip of this on social media was viewed five million times.

From December 2021 onwards, UK and international journalists suggested Johnson's political career was threatened by the controversy.

There was debate as to whether public disquiet about the controversy might lead to the public being less willing to adhere to new restrictions brought in response to the Omicron variant of SARS-CoV-2, which began spreading in the UK in December 2021. However, Steve Reicher argued in The BMJ that any effect was likely to be small and that it could lead some individuals to be more adherent.

The Week, the BBC and The Daily Telegraph all selected a photo of Allegra Stratton giving her resignation statement as a key image of 2021.

The reported gathering on 16 April 2021, on the day before the funeral of Prince Philip, Duke of Edinburgh, was compared by opposition politicians and The Guardian to the social distancing rules that applied to the funeral attended by Queen Elizabeth II. JD Wetherspoon founder Tim Martin accused Johnson of "hypocrisy", arguing that much of the controversy would have been avoided if Downing Street staff had been able to visit pubs, which at the time were closed due to lockdown restrictions. On the same day, the campaign group Led By Donkeys produced a spoof video of Johnson being questioned about the controversy by characters from the TV drama Line of Duty. It was viewed five million times with a day of publication.

Philip Mawer, former Parliamentary Commissioner for Standards, and Alex Allan, Johnson's former independent advisor on ministerial standards, both said they felt Partygate and other scandals have eroded public confidence in the present system. Both maintained there needed to be an independent system for investigating ministers accused of problems. Currently, the Prime Minister can decide not to hold an investigation and the public feel this can prevent desirable investigations being held.

After FPNs were issued in March 2022, Starmer said that Johnson was either "trashing the ministerial code or he's claiming he was repeatedly lied to by his own advisers, that he didn't know what was going on in his own house and his own office". He said Johnson had to resign, a position also supported by the Liberal Democrats and SNP.

On 20 April 2022, the COVID-19 Bereaved Families for Justice group described Johnson's apology as "the words of someone who is sorry they have been caught, not someone who regrets the harm they have done". Safiah Ngah, a spokesperson for the group said: "[Johnson's] claim that he didn't realise rules were being broken is just laughable and shows he still takes us for idiots."

On 23 May 2022, Starmer said: "The culture is set at the top, the can should be carried by the prime minister. He has responsibility. I doubt he will, because he doesn't take responsibility for anything he's done in his life. But the culture in Downing Street is set from the top, as it is with any organisation, and that culture has led to industrial-scale law-breaking." The same day, pictures obtained by ITV News showed Johnson raising a glass of wine in front of a table with bottles on it at the leaving party for Lee Cain on 13 November 2020. Scotland Yard were urged to explain why Johnson had not been issued with an FPN for attending the gathering.

In September 2023, the National Audit Office criticised the government's justification for paying a £265,000 bill for Boris Johnson's legal fees relating to Partygate.

In a June 2024 Investigatory Powers Tribunal hearing, a lawyer for Christine Lee (who was accused of political interference activities on behalf of China) read a message sent from Barry Gardiner to Lee, who wrote that "many people" believed that alerting lawmakers of potential spy activity was timed to divert attention from the Partygate scandal.

=== Within the Conservative Party ===
==== Initial responses ====
On 12 January 2022, many senior figures of the Scottish Conservatives called for Johnson to resign, including leader Douglas Ross and former leaders Ruth Davidson and Jackson Carlaw. On 13 January 2022, 27 of the 31 Conservative Scottish MSPs came out publicly against Johnson after his appearance in Parliament the previous day. William Wragg, the Conservative Chair of the Public Administration and Constitutional Affairs Select Committee, called for Johnson's resignation. On 13 January, Conservative MP Andrew Bridgen stated that he had submitted a letter of no confidence in the prime minister, and Conservative MP for Romsey and Southampton North, Caroline Nokes, also called for him to resign. The Sutton Coldfield Conservative Association unanimously passed a motion calling for the prime minister to stand down. A poll of Conservative Party members in early January 2022 by YouGov found 38% felt that Johnson was doing a bad job as prime minister and 34% wanted him to resign, which were big increases than when YouGov had last polled Conservative members in the summer of 2020.

On 15 January, former Conservative minister Tobias Ellwood told the BBC that Johnson had to "lead or step aside". Former children's minister and MP for East Worthing and Shoreham, Tim Loughton called for Johnson to resign.

Johnson faced more pressure from rebel MPs as they arrived back at Westminster on 17 January, after dealing with negative responses from Conservative associations and constituents. Some reported they had received almost 1,000 emails from dissatisfied voters.

The Times reported that, on the evening of 18 January, more than 20 Conservative MPs first elected in 2019 had met to discuss Johnson's leadership, with some preparing to submit letters of no confidence after Prime Minister's Questions on 19 January. The Evening Standard said that as many as 20 of the MPs were preparing to submit the letters. This was dubbed the 'Pork Pie Plot' (or 'Putsch') by a Johnson loyalist minister as one of the MPs who was said to be involved, Alicia Kearns, represents Rutland and Melton, the town of Melton Mowbray being famous for its pork pies. Kearns has denied being an organiser of the rebellion.

On 19 January, Bury South MP Christian Wakeford said he had submitted a letter of no confidence. Later that day, shortly before Prime Minister's Questions, Wakeford defected from the Conservative Party to the Labour Party, although his first contact with Labour predated the controversy and he was initially motivated by other issues. It was later reported that up to seven MPs had withdrawn their letters of no confidence. By the end of 19 January, some Conservative MPs told the BBC that Wakeford's defection had caused a change in mood, namely that there was a "stepping back" from immediate attempts to obtain a no-confidence vote in Johnson's leadership and a wish to wait until after Sue Gray's report was published.

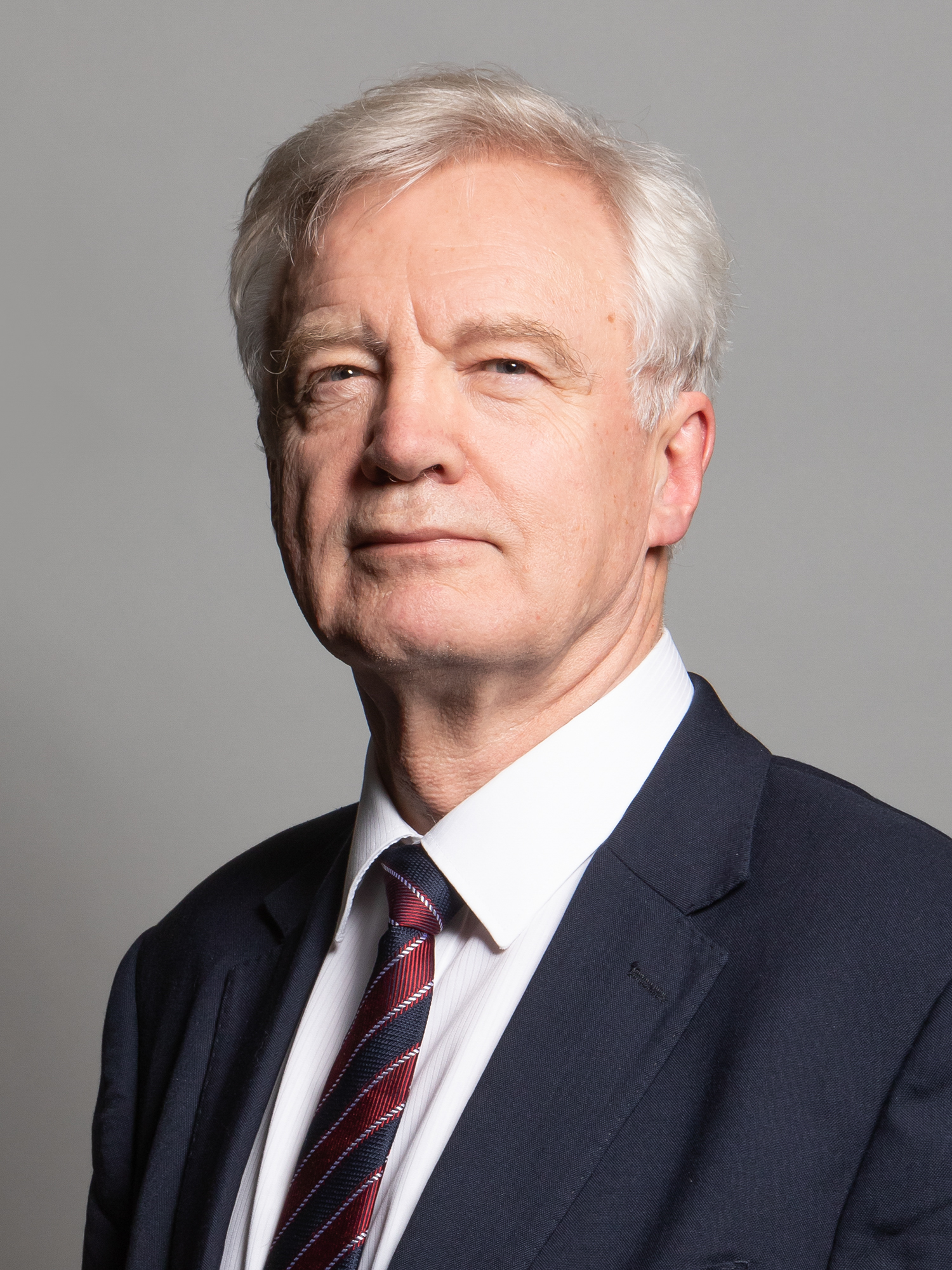
Conservative MP David Davis called on 19 January for Johnson to resign, making reference to the 1940 Norway Debate that led to Neville Chamberlain's resignation.

At the end of Prime Minister's Questions on 19 January, Conservative former minister David Davis called for Johnson to resign, quoting Leo Amery calling on Neville Chamberlain to resign during the Norway Debate in 1940, and saying: "You have sat there too long for all the good you have done. In the name of God, go". BBC Newsnight's political editor Nick Watt said Davis would have intended it to be "particularly devastating" to Johnson.

On 26 January, Nicky Wylie, the leader of the Conservative group on Cheshire East Council, quit the party citing the controversy.

==== Alleged intimidation of MPs opposed to Johnson ====
On 20 January, Conservative MP William Wragg, chair of the Public Administration and Constitutional Affairs Select Committee, accused 10 Downing Street staff of threatening him and other colleagues over their opposition to Johnson's leadership. He said "the intimidation of a member of parliament is a serious matter" and "The reports of which I'm aware would seem to constitute blackmail". Wragg said damaging publicity had been threatened, as had removal of government investment in MPs' constituencies. Wragg advised MP's affected to contact the police or the Commons Speaker.

Johnson said he had "seen no evidence [and] heard no evidence" of what Wragg said and that he would look into them. The Secretary of State for Culture, Nadine Dorries, called Wragg's accusations "attention-seeking behaviour" and "nonsense". Energy minister and former government whip Greg Hands said of what Wragg said that they "not been borne out by anybody else", and that "This is not something that happens".

Chris Bryant, Chair of the Commons Select Committee on Standards, said roughly a dozen Conservative MPs had made similar allegations of whips threatening to withdraw funding for their constituencies in the past few days; threats included withholding funds for campaigning and infrastructure such as by-passes and schools. Bryant said, "I have even heard MPs alleging that the prime minister himself has been doing this. What I have said to all of those people is that that is misconduct in public office. The people who should be dealing with such allegations are the police. It is illegal. We are meant to operate as MPs without fear or favour. The allocation of taxpayer funding to constituencies should be according to need, not according to the need to keep the prime minister in his job".

==== After the Sue Gray update ====
Following the release of Sue Gray's update on 31 January 2022, Conservative MP Andrew Mitchell said he no longer supported Johnson. Former prime minister Theresa May also questioned Johnson's response to Gray's report, saying that people "had a right to expect their prime minister to have read the rules, to understand the meaning of the rules" and to "set an example". She said No. 10 "was not observing the regulations they had imposed on members of the public" and accused Johnson of "either not understanding the rules or believing they did not apply to his team". In protest over Johnson's handling of the controversy, Guildford MP Angela Richardson resigned from her position as parliamentary private secretary to Michael Gove, the Secretary of State for Levelling Up, Housing and Communities.

On 1–2 February, the Conservative MP for Waveney, Peter Aldous, submitted a letter of no confidence. Three others—Tobias Ellwood, MP for Bournemouth East and Chair of the Defence Select Committee; Anthony Mangnall, MP for Totnes; and Gary Streeter, MP for South West Devon—submitted letters of no confidence in him. By 3 February 2022, ITV News reported that 12 Conservative MPs, 21 MSPs (including Douglas Ross, who is both an MP and MSP), and two peers had called for Johnson's resignation, and BBC News reported that 17 MPs had submitted letters of no confidence. Roger Gale and Charles Walker both wanted Johnson to resign.

On 4 February, Newcastle MP Aaron Bell said he had submitted a letter of no confidence. The same day, Nick Gibb, former Minister of State for School Standards, also submitted one. Alec Shelbrooke, the MP for Elmet and Rothwell, described Johnson's position as, "indefensible". On 6 February, Conservative MPs Iain Duncan Smith and Kwasi Kwarteng both called for Johnson to be given more time.

On 10 February, former Conservative prime minister John Major said Johnson, "broke lockdown laws" and added in his opinion the government felt it "need not obey the rules. ... Brazen excuses were dreamed up. Day after day the public was asked to believe the unbelievable. Ministers were sent out to defend the indefensible – making themselves look gullible or foolish".

Following the 2022 Russian invasion of Ukraine on 24 February, Ross withdrew his letter of no confidence, saying he felt a leadership contest would be inappropriate during the conflict, as did Bridgen.

Alex Chalk, the Solicitor General and MP for Cheltenham, would not defend Johnson after Johnson received an FPN; instead Chalk said senior politicians should "act in a way that is beyond reproach". Karen Bradley, former Secretary of State for Northern Ireland and MP for Staffordshire Moorlands, and Neil Hudson, MP for Penrith and The Border, among others, criticised Johnson. Bradley said: "I do wish to make it clear that if I had been a minister found to have broken the laws that I passed, I would be tendering my resignation now." Hudson said he would not "defend the indefensible" and it was "extremely disappointing" that Johnson and Sunak had been given FPNs. Hudson added, "The fact that the lawmakers went on to break those very laws they brought in to keep us all safe is deeply damaging for our democracy. That situation is untenable." Bradley and Hudson both expressed unease about changing prime minister during the 2022 Russian invasion of Ukraine. Caroline Nokes called on Johnson to resign for a second time.

On 13 April, Conservative backbencher Nigel Mills, MP for Amber Valley, said that Johnson's position was "untenable". Separately, Justice Minister Lord David Wolfson resigned in protest.

On 19 April, senior Conservative MP Mark Harper said Johnson was now "no longer worthy" of remaining Prime Minister. On 21 April, Tory MP Steve Baker, the former chair of the European Research Group, publicly stated that "the gig is up" and that Johnson should be "long gone by now". On 23 April, Toby Helm and Michael Savage of The Guardian suggested that increasing numbers of Conservative MPs believed Johnson needed to be replaced as prime minister soon, and that many were waiting until after the result of the May 2022 local elections to decide whether to replace him. Barry Macleod-Cullinane, who was deputy leader in Harrow, London, said: "We now know that Boris Johnson broke the law and has lied repeatedly to parliament and to us. He's taking us for fools – and we can't let him get away with it."

Following the publication of the Sue Gray report, Julian Sturdy, John Baron, David Simmonds and Stephen Hammond called for Johnson to resign. On 27 May, Paul Holmes, MP for Eastleigh, resigned from his position as Parliamentary Private Secretary to Home Secretary Priti Patel over concerns around "toxic culture" at the heart of government he said was described in the report. Discontent with Johnson among Conservative MPs was growing and many MPs feared losing their seats. In the days following the Sue Gray report, further MPs (Elliot Colburn, Bob Neill, Alicia Kearns, John Stevenson and Steve Brine) publicly declared that they had submitted letters of no confidence, whilst others such as Jeremy Wright called for Johnson's resignation without declaring whether they had submitted a letter. Andrew Bridgen also stated that he had resubmitted his letter after previously withdrawing it. On 31 May 2022, Andrea Leadsom, a former Conservative minister, wrote, "it is painfully clear to me that given the extent and severity of rule-breaking taking place over a 20-month period, it is extremely unlikely that senior leaders were unaware of what was going on".

On 1 June 2022, two of Johnson's cabinet colleagues challenged the speculation that he would have to resign. The culture secretary, Nadine Dorries, said that the "overwhelming" majority of party MPs still backed him. Dorries said that Partygate was now only a Westminster bubble issue as the public was "ready to move on" and that "The people who most want to get rid of Boris Johnson are Keir Starmer and the SNP".

==== Confidence vote ====
On 6 June 2022, the threshold for the number of letters of no confidence, from Conservative MPs, was reached and a confidence vote in Boris Johnson's leadership was called. After the news was announced but before the vote, Conservative MP John Penrose resigned as the Prime Minister's anti-corruption champion because of Partygate. Ahead of the vote, Johnson addressed Conservative MPs. The Times journalist Patrick Maguire reported that, when he was asked about the behaviour described in Gray's report, Johnson replied, "I'd do it again". Johnson won with 211 votes to 148, but many commentators saw his position weakened.

==== Johnson resignation ====
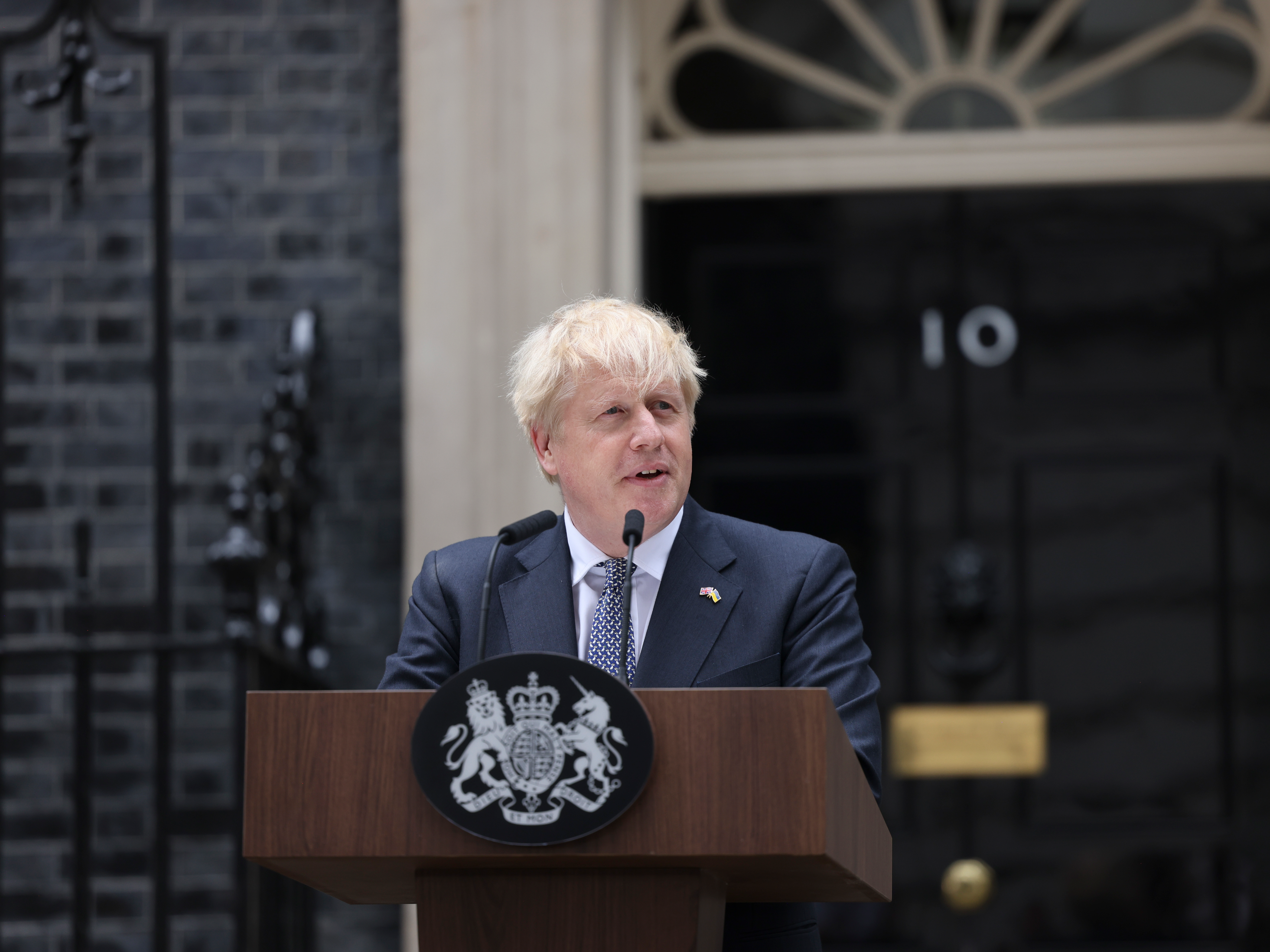
Johnson giving his resignation statement

The challenge to Johnson's leadership returned when, on 5 July, Rishi Sunak as Chancellor of the Exchequer, Sajid Javid as Health Secretary and other MPs resigned from the government. Some of those resigning explicitly referenced Partygate in their decisions, including Javid the departing Solicitor General Alex Chalk and Pensions Minister Guy Opperman. Following 60 further resignations, Johnson resigned as Leader of the Conservative Party and Prime Minister.

=== Election results ===
The controversy was seen as one factor in the Conservatives' loss of a by-election in North Shropshire, held on 16 December 2021.

In the May 2022 local elections in England, Scotland and Wales, the Conservatives lost 481 seats (of the 6,173 total) compared to the previous elections. They won control of 35 councils, eleven fewer than previously. Doorstep campaigners cited Partygate and failures to address the increases in the cost of living as key issues.

=== Opinion polls ===
Results of opinion polling carried out in Great Britain of voting intention for the governing Conservatives and official opposition Labour, over the period between 11 November 2021 and 31 January 2022. Each dot represents the party's vote share in a single opinion poll.

Opinion polling in early December 2021 found that the majority of the public believed that a party had taken place at Downing Street in December 2020 and that this was not permitted under the restrictions in place at the time. The controversy was seen as a factor in the Conservative Party and Boris Johnson's declining rates of public support in December 2021. Various polls throughout late 2021 and early 2022 suggested that a majority of voters wanted Johnson to resign as Prime Minister over the controversy. After Johnson apologised for the 20 May 2020 gathering, one poll indicated that 68% of the public considered his apology not to have been sincere.

By 14 January 2022, YouGov polling found that 72% of the British public held an unfavourable view of Johnson, a record low for his tenure and surpassing the lowest popularity of Theresa May during her premiership. Following the reporting of further gatherings in January 2022, the Conservatives fell further in the polls, with Labour having a lead of around ten points. Polling by Ipsos MORI in January 2022 found that "lack of faith in politicians and politics" was cited as a major problem facing the country by 25% of the public, the highest recorded since 2016 and "likely related" to the revelations of lockdown parties.

The i described polling in reaction to Boris Johnson and others receiving FPNs as showing that these events "had some impact – but maybe not as much as the Prime Minister's opponents might hope."

According to a snap poll conducted by YouGov the day the Sue Gray report was published, 59% of Britons thought that Johnson should resign. This was a 2% increase from 4 April, when his FPN was issued. Despite the report, Johnson continued to hold the support of Conservative voters: 63% wanted him to remain in office versus 27% who want him to resign. A majority of Labour voters (88%) wanted Johnson to step down. Three quarters of the public believed Johnson knowingly lied. Even among the Tories, over half of voters think Johnson lied, with only 29% of Conservative voters believing him.

=== Independent adviser on ministers' interests ===
Lord Geidt, the Government's independent adviser on ministers' interests, published his annual report on 31 May 2022. In a lengthy preface, he said: "A legitimate question has arisen as to whether those facts [the issuing of a FPN to Johnson] alone might have constituted a breach of the overarching duty within the ministerial code of complying with the law". He continued: "It may be that the Prime Minister considers that no such breach of his Ministerial Code has occurred. In that case, I believe a Prime Minister should respond accordingly, setting out his case in public."

Geidt said: "I have repeatedly counselled the Prime Minister's official and political advisers that the Prime Minister should be ready to offer public comment on his obligations under the Ministerial Code, even if he has judged himself not to be in breach. This has been my standing advice, which I was assured had been conveyed to the Prime Minister. Its purpose has simply been to ensure that the Prime Minister should publicly be seen to take responsibility for his own conduct under his own Ministerial Code. That advice has not been heeded and, in relation to the allegations about unlawful gatherings in Downing Street, the Prime Minister has made not a single public reference to the Ministerial Code."

The Times reported that Geidt had threatened to resign, on 31 May, unless Johnson publicly explained his position. Johnson published a letter, later that day, clearing himself and Sunak of breaching the code. He wrote he had "no intent to break the regulations" and that an FPN was not a criminal conviction, and blamed "a failure of communication" between his and Geidt's offices.

On 14 June 2022, while giving evidence to MPs, Geidt said that he did not have the authority to investigate Johnson's behaviour with respect to Covid regulations, and that he had not requested an investigation, and that instead, he had asked Johnson for a statement, which he gave and in which he cleared himself of any breach. He added, the "ordinary man or woman" may think it was "reasonable to say that perhaps a fixed-penalty notice and the prime minister paying for it may have constituted not meeting the overarching duty of the ministerial code of complying with the law". Geidt stated that he was not fully independent since he was answerable to the Prime Minister rather than to an independent authority. On 15 June 2022 Geidt resigned. On 16 June 2022, it was reported that Geidt's resignation was due to a request for advice on a trade issue that had left him with no choice but to quit.

== Labour Party event in Durham ==
Late on the evening of 30 April 2021, before the Hartlepool by-election and local elections, a Labour Party campaign team in Durham, including Keir Starmer and Angela Rayner, were videoed through an office window. Starmer was seen with a beer while others ate. Within days, the story was published. Labour said that the event had complied with the rules for work gatherings, with a pause for food.

On 8 December 2021, Johnson sought to counter Partygate allegations by alluding to these events. Durham Constabulary initially said no action was warranted, but then re-started investigations on 6 May. Starmer and Rayner said they had not broken any rules, but would resign if given FPNs. Having collected questionnaires from those present, on 8 July 2022, Durham Constabulary concluded that the gathering was reasonably necessary for work purposes and cleared all the attendees.

== See also ==
- Dominic Cummings scandal
- Margaret Ferrier, an SNP politician who broke COVID-19 rules
- Oireachtas Golf Society scandal, a similar political scandal in Ireland
- Witman Hung partygate, a similar political scandal in Hong Kong
- Partygate, a 2023 British political docudrama dramatisation of the scandal
- Political impact of the COVID-19 pandemic
- List of political scandals in the United Kingdom
