= Vote Leave bus =

Campaign bus used by Vote Leave

The Vote Leave campaign bus in Southampton

The Vote Leave campaign used a large red battle bus in the lead up to the 2016 United Kingdom European Union membership referendum. A decal on the side of the bus made the false claim and following pledge that "We send the EU £350 million a week, let's fund our NHS instead", accompanied with the slogan "Let's take back control". The bus became one of the most prominent symbols of the campaign.

The £350 million figure, conceived by Vote Leave campaign leader Dominic Cummings, was disputed by the UK Statistics Authority and Institute for Fiscal Studies as well as other media, though Vote Leave continued to stand by the figure, and the bus continued to be featured in news media. Cummings has credited the words on the bus for the Leave campaign's victory, and 42 percent of people who had heard of the claim still believed it was true by 2018.

== History ==
The bus was a Starliner luxury team coach which was manufactured by German company Neoplan, with its production beginning in Poland and finishing in Germany. Its interior contained air conditioning, multiple screens, DVD and CD player, a fridge and a boiler. It was owned by Acklams Coaches, a coach rental company in Yorkshire, and had previously been used to transport the Pakistan national cricket team during their UK tour. Vote Leave hired the bus for around 30 days according to an Acklams director, costing £400,000 to do so.

On 11 May 2016, the bus began a tour of the United Kingdom, beginning its tour in Truro, Cornwall. There, Boris Johnson stood on the steps of the bus and waved a Cornish pasty; this received criticism as the pasty was protected by the EU's Protected Geographical Indication rules, meaning it could not be made anywhere other than Cornwall while being named as such, though the Leave campaign stated these protections would remain in force.

The bus then set off for Dorset. The bus stopped in Christchurch where he was door-stepped by Michael Crick. Sky News reported on the origin of the bus in the European mainland the same day. The Britain Stronger in Europe campaign also stated that if the UK were not in the EU at the time, the bus would have cost £456,000, more than its actual £400,000 price, due to increased tariffs. Rob Oxley, Leave campaign media director, replied that "Of course it’s a German bus. We want it to run on time", and that Germany would still sell their buses to the UK if it left the EU.

=== After the referendum ===
The day immediately after the referendum, on 24 June 2016, the bus was stripped of its branding and was then used by Will Young as his Glastonbury Festival tour bus.

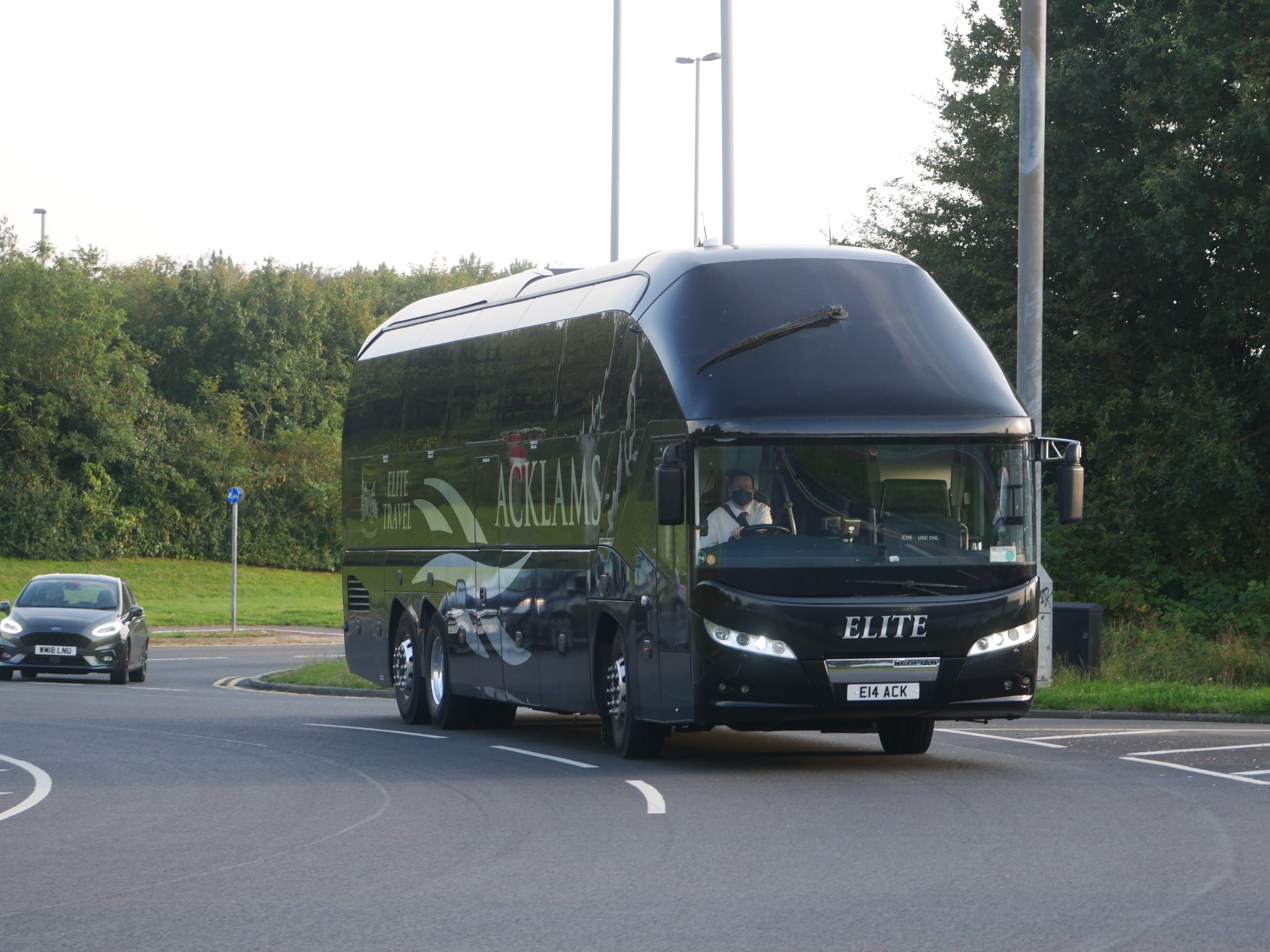
The bus in 2020 with Acklams Coaches branding, identifiable by the number plate E14 ACK

Three weeks following the referendum, the bus was spotted in Queen Elizabeth Olympic Park in London, with its Vote Leave branding restored; Paul Acklam of Acklam Coaches, when contacted by Buzzfeed News, claimed that the bus had been hired by "some film company". On 18 July 2016, The Daily Telegraph reported that Greenpeace had parked the bus outside the Houses of Parliament and had then rebranded its text with the words "time for truth" and the hashtag "#comeclean" and stating that it was "covering up the bold-faced lie" with "messages of hope". Greenpeace also asked members of the public to send in messages that would be written on the bus.

On 7 June 2017, the same bus used by Vote Leave with the number plate E14 ACK arrived at Edgbaston Cricket Ground for the ICC Champions Trophy match, again being used by the Pakistan national cricket team. The bus' decal had been changed to the team's colours.

By September 2017, London-based fintech startup company Monese had hired the bus from Acklams for a tour around Europe to promote its expansion into Europe, spending £35,000 to lease the bus and design and print its decal. Text on the side of the bus, both in English and French, stated that Monese users would be permitted to transfer up to €350 million between the UK and the eurozone for no fee.

In April 2026, the bus failed its MOT test due to "major defects" that meant it required immediate repair. This included deterioration of several of its suspension components and corrosion in the chassis. It was fixed and went back on the road following a retest.

== £350 million figure ==
The most significant feature of the bus was the claim on its side which stated that Britain sent £350 million to the European Union every week. This was based upon the Treasury's estimation of the gross amount of money that the UK contributed to the EU in 2014, totalling to £18.8 billion, or in 2015, totalling to £17.8 billion, or £342 million per week.

While Dominic Cummings is credited with the creation of the figure on the bus, which began its tour on 11 May 2016, Gisela Stuart, co-chair of Vote Leave, said on BBC Radio 4 on 15 April that "Every week we send £350m to Brussels. I'd rather that we control how to spend that money, and if I had that control I would spend it on the NHS." This claim was disputed by BBC News the same day. Dominic Cummings intended that use of the figure would stoke up arguments concerning future payments to the EU, which would be beneficial for the Vote Leave campaign.

On 11 May, Boris Johnson admitted that "we do get some of [the money] back, but we get it at the discretion of EU officials who decide how they're going to spend UK taxpayers' money in the UK." He continued to stand by the £350 million figure as he said it "represent[ed] accurately the gross sum that is sent".

On 23 May, leading Brexit campaigner Andrea Leadsom repeatedly cited a "£10 billion independence dividend", which was her estimate of Britain's net contribution to the EU when taking into account the rebate as well as EU funding to the UK, on Newsnight. Other key people in the Vote Leave campaign began to use this figure instead.

On 25 May, the Institute for Fiscal Studies accused the Brexit campaign of pushing "clearly absurd" figures in a report, stating that £8 billion would be a more accurate annual figure of Britain's net contributions to the EU, and that a vote to leave the EU would instead cost the country £20-40 billion per year. Brexit campaigner John Redwood implicitly accepted that the £350 million figure was untrue on the BBC's Today programme, though retained that additional spending would only be around half the £350 million figure. On 27 May, the UK Statistics Authority chair Andrew Dilnot made a stronger statement against Vote Leave, stating that the continued use of the figure was "misleading and undermine[d] trust in official statistics".

Full Fact, a fact-checking organisation, argued in June that the £350 million estimation did not take into account Britain's rebate, which had been negotiated under Margaret Thatcher in 1984 to be significantly lower than the usual 1% of national gross domestic product paid by other member states. As the UK's budget rebate to the EU in 2015 was £4.9 billion, an estimation involving the rebate would total to £12.9 billion, or £248 million per week, significantly less than £342 million per week. This rebate was deducted before any payment to the EU was made. An article by The Guardian further argued that the £350 million figure also ignored EU spending on the UK, estimated at £4.4 billion in 2015, as well as injections from the EU into the UK's private sector, which was £1.4 billion in 2013. It thus argued that the net figure was actually £7.1 billion or £136 million per week. The Guardian also disputed the use of the word "send" on the bus, and the claim that this money would be available to spend on the NHS if the UK left the EU.

On 4 June, Michael Gove agreed to an independent audit of the £350 million claim during an interview on Sky News.

On 9 June, Nicola Sturgeon of the Scottish National Party stated in a TV debate that the continued existence of the £350 million claim on the side of the campaign bus was a "scandal" and accused Johnson of "driving around the country in a bus with a giant whopper painted on the side", and Angela Eagle of Labour told Johnson to "get that lie off your bus!" Johnson repeatedly defended the use of the number. Conservative MP Dr Sarah Wollaston defected from Vote Leave to support the Remain campaign the same day, citing that she no longer felt comfortable with Vote Leave due to the £350 million claim being false.

=== After the referendum ===
Following the referendum, a number of prominent Vote Leave campaigners began to distance themselves from the £350 million figure, while others insisted it was correct. The pledge to spend £350 million on the NHS per week was immediately discarded when Theresa May became prime minister.

On 5 October 2016, Craig Oliver, former spin doctor for David Cameron, criticised BBC News for continuing to show images of the bus after the claim had been debunked. He asked on Radio 4, "Why, on the 6 and 10 o'clock news, [is Johnson] repeatedly doing interviews in front of a bus with a claim that is straightforwardly untrue?" A BBC spokesman, in response, cited several examples of the £350 million figure being debunked by the BBC, stating that "The fundamental charge — that BBC reporting resulted in a false balance in which fanciful claims got the same billing as serious insights — is not true."

In September 2017, Boris Johnson mentioned the figure in an article he authored for The Daily Telegraph, writing that "once we have settled our accounts, we will take back control of roughly £350 million per week. It would be a fine thing, as many of us have pointed out, if a lot of that money went on the NHS." In response, Sir David Norgrove of the UK Statistics Authority wrote to Johnson that he was "surprised and disappointed" that Johnson had repeated the figure "in connection with the amount that might be available for extra public spending when we leave the European Union". Responding in turn, Johnson replied that he was also "surprised and disappointed" in Norgrove's letter and that he had not said that the £350 million would be available for public spending, but instead that while the government "will continue to spend significantly on UK priorities such as agriculture and research, that spending will be done under UK control." He also argued that the EU rebate was not under the UK's control, instead being agreed on by all EU member states.

In 2017, Dominic Cummings, leader of the Vote Leave campaign, stated that "all our research and the close result strongly suggest[ed]" that Remain would have won if Vote Leave had not used the £350 million NHS claim, and that "It was clearly the most effective argument, not only with the crucial swing [vote] but with almost every demographic".

In January 2018, Boris Johnson said in an interview with the Guardian that "there was an error on the side of the bus. We grossly underestimated the sum over which we would be able to take back control", and also argued that the UK's contributions to the EU were already at £362m per week in 2017–18 and would annually rise to £410m, £431m, and then to £438m by 2020–21.

A study by King's College London and Ipsos MORI, published in October 2018 found that 42 percent of people who had heard of the £350 million claim still believed it was true, whereas 36 percent thought it was false and 22 per cent were unsure. The study also found that criticism of the claim by the UK Statistics Authority and others had not changed belief in the claim since before the referendum.

Jean-Claude Juncker, then president of the European Commission, said in May 2019 that, "in hindsight, failing to rebut the claim that the UK sent £350 million per week to Brussels without drawing any benefit, was a mistake".

In June 2019, a private prosecution brought against Johnson by businessman Marcus Ball concerning Johnson's £350 million claim, following a crowdfunding campaign of £200,000 to finance the legal action, was thrown out by the High Court after five minutes of deliberation by two judges. Johnson's lawyers had stated that the application was a "political stunt" and that he wanted to "undermine the referendum result", whereas Ball said he had a "duty to [his] country to keep fighting lying in politics and [he took] it bloody seriously."

In the ten years following the referendum, spending on the NHS actually increased (in real terms) by £1.1bn per week, though it is not possible to quantify how much of this might be attributed to savings in EU contributions.

== Imitative buses ==
On 21 February 2018, a similar red bus which campaigned against Brexit set off for a tour of 30 towns and cities in the UK, featuring the claim on it side, "Brexit to cost £2,000 million a week, says government’s own report. Is it worth it?" The bus had been crowdfunded through 661 small donors and was led by a small, unaffiliated and unpaid group. Channel 4 News found that the £2 billion figure was an estimate of a potential shortfall from Brexit in 15 years' time, and that it was not clearly linked to any figures from recent government reports.

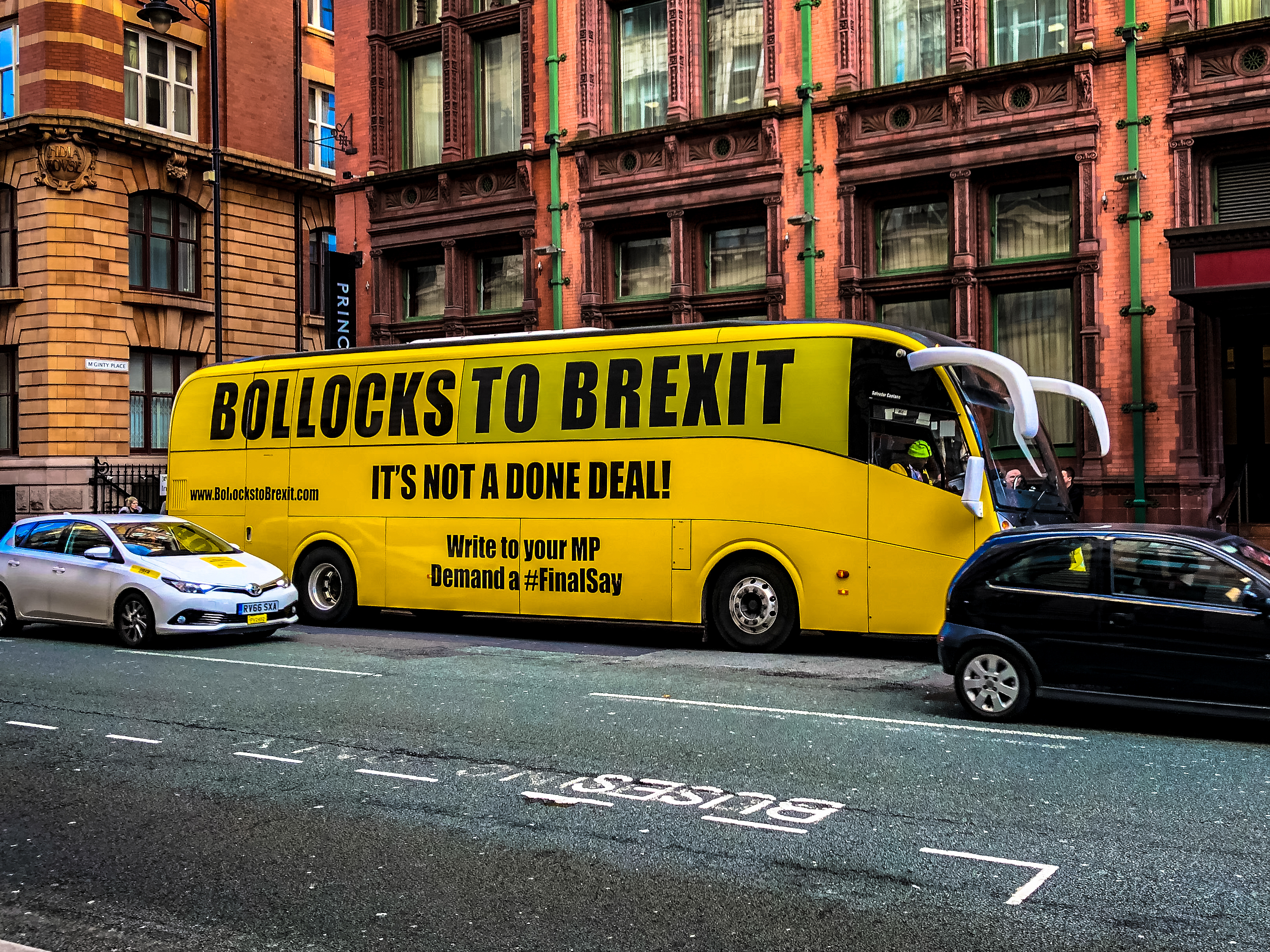
Bollocks to Brexit bus

A crowdfunded bus decorated in yellow "Bollocks to Brexit" livery toured the UK and European Union in December 2018. The bus visited the houses of Parliament on 7 December, before going to Islington North, Uxbridge and South Ruislip, and Maidenhead, constituencies of leader of the opposition Jeremy Corbyn, as well as prime ministers Boris Johnson and Theresa May respectively. It stopped in Dublin on 17 December, visiting Guinness Storehouse, the British embassy, and Merrion Square, before setting off for Belfast.

A version of the bus featured in Brexit: The Uncivil War, a political drama about Brexit on Channel 4.
