= John Groves (journalist) =

British journalist and civil servant (born 1922)

John Groves CB, OBE

Downing Street Press Secretary
- In office 1963–1964
- Prime Minister: Alec Douglas-Home
- Preceded by: Sir Harold Evans
- Succeeded by: Trevor Lloyd-Hughes

Personal details
- Born: John Dudley Groves; 12 August 1922
- Died: 26 December 2007 (aged 85) Wiltshire
- Spouse: Pamela Holliday (m. 1943)
- Education: St Paul's school
- Occupation: Journalist civil servant

Military service
- Allegiance: United Kingdom
- Branch/service: British Army
- Years of service: until 1945
- Unit: Reconnaissance regiment
- Battles/wars: World War II

John Dudley Groves CB OBE (12 August 1922 – 26 December 2007) was a British former journalist and civil servant who served as Downing Street Press Secretary under Alec Douglas-Home from 1963 to 1964.

== Early life ==
The youngest son of Walter Groves, founding editor of The Motor magazine, John Groves was educated at St Paul's school and would follow in his father's footsteps into journalism, joining the Richmond Herald as a reporter during the Blitz. He subsequently enlisted in the army to fight in World War II as member of the Reconnaissance regiment.

== Career ==
After demobilisation Groves returned to journalism and was a member of the Press Association parliamentary staff. He subsequently worked as deputy lobby correspondent for the Times newspaper from 1951 before leaving in 1958 to head up the press office at the Treasury.

After two years, in 1960, Groves was promoted to deputy press secretary to Harold Macmillan and was in the post during the time of the Profumo scandal. He then succeeded Sir Harold Evans to become press secretary to Sir Alec Douglas-Home when the latter became prime minister in October 1963. He vacated the post with the defeat of the Alec Douglas-Home at the October 1964 general election.

In later life he served as chief press officer at the Ministry of Defence, the director general of the Central Office of Information and head of the Government Information Service. John Groves was awarded an OBE in the 1964 Prime Minister's Resignation Honours and Companion of the Bath in the 1981 Queen's Birthday Honours. He retired in 1982 and was a founder of the Pewsey Vale Railway Society.

== Personal life ==
Groves was married in 1943 to Pamela Holliday until her death in May 2007. The union bore two daughters and a son.

Government offices
Preceded by Sir Harold Evans	Downing Street Press Secretary; 1963–1964	Succeeded by Trevor Lloyd-Hughes
