= Nazemi =

Nazemi is a surname. Notable people with the surname include:

- Afshin Nazemi (born 1971), Iranian football coach
- Latif Nazemi (born 1947), Afghan Persian poet and literary critic
- Sophie Nazemi (fl. 2016), British political aide

== See also ==
- Nazmi
