= Harry James (disambiguation) =

Harry James (1916–1983) was an American musician, bandleader and trumpeter.

Harry James may also refer to:

- Harry James (American football) (1881–1947), American football quarterback
- Harry James (Australian footballer) (1877–1940), Australian rules footballer for Fitzroy
- Harry James (drummer) (born 1960), English drummer
- Harry James (politician), American politician from Georgia
- Fugative (Harry James Byart, born 1994), English singer, rapper, songwriter, and record producer
- T. G. H. James (1923–2009), British Egyptologist, known as Harry James

== See also ==
- Henry James (disambiguation)
- Harold James (disambiguation)
