= James Schneider =

English political organiser (born 1987)

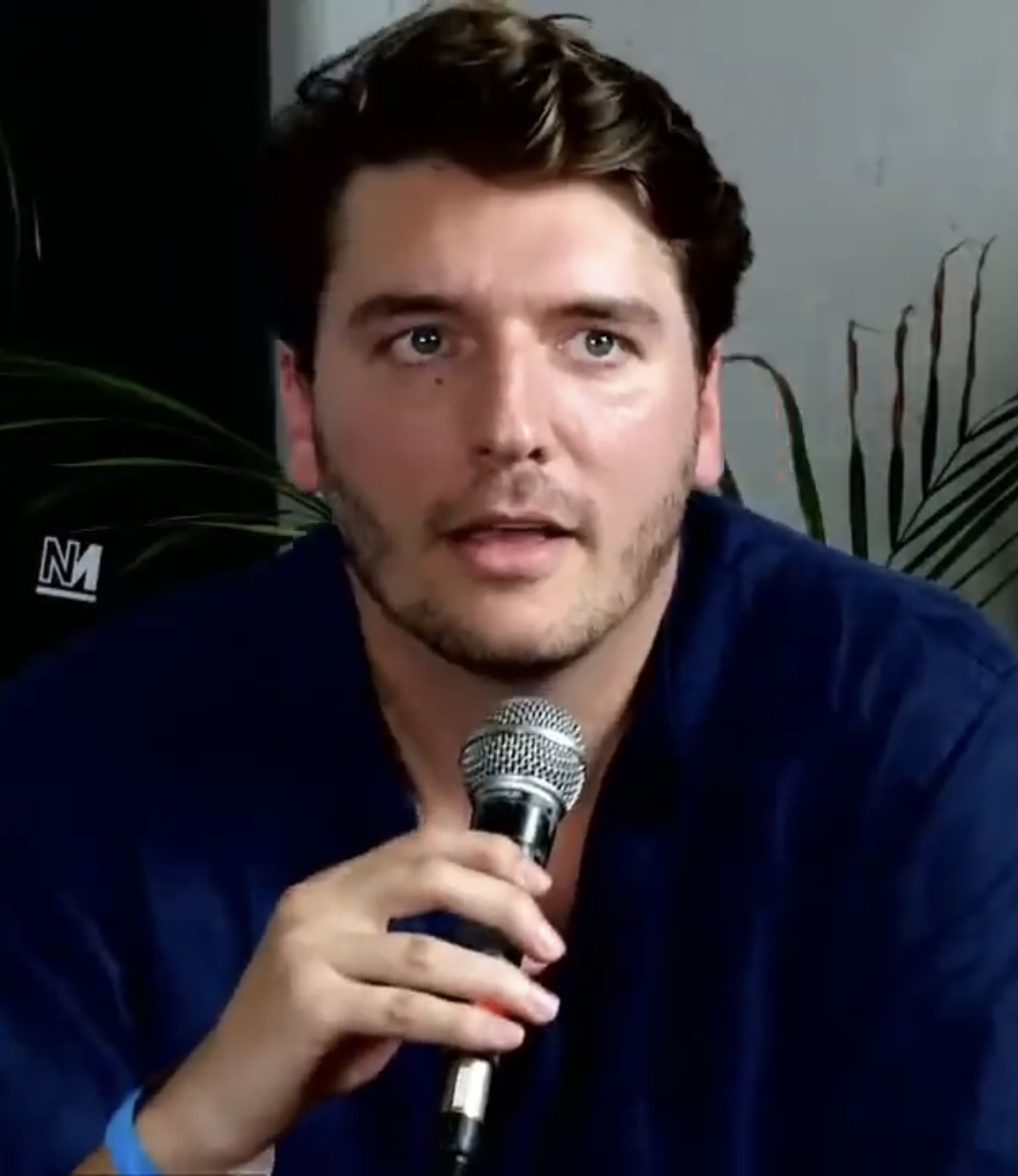
- Schneider in 2021
- Born: James Gerald Hylton Schneider; 17 June 1987 (age 39); Westminster, London, England
- Education: Trinity College, Oxford
- Occupations: Political organiser; communications director; editor; writer
- Organisation: Momentum
- Political party: Labour
- Spouse: Sophie Nazemi

James Gerald Hylton Schneider (born 17 June 1987) is a political organiser and writer currently serving as Communications Director for Progressive International. He co-founded the left-wing grassroots movement Momentum. In October 2016, he was appointed public relations advisor to then leader of the Labour Party, Jeremy Corbyn, as Director of Strategic Communications.

In 2022, Schneider published Our Bloc: How We Win, laying out a strategy for the British left in the 2020s, both within Labour and beyond. He is also an international chess player, representing Saint Vincent and the Grenadines at the 44th Chess Olympiad in Chennai, India in 2022.

== Early life ==
Schneider was born to Jewish parents in central London. His father Brian was a financier and CEO of Soho-based property company OEM plc. He died in 2004 at the age of 48, when James was a teenager. James' mother Tessa Lang is a property developer.

Schneider and his brother, Tim, were brought up in Primrose Hill, North London. The family also holidayed in Glen Tanar, Scotland.

Schneider attended the Dragon School in Oxford for preparatory school. Then, from 2000 to 2005, he boarded at Winchester College in Hampshire as a member of Chawker's (Hawkins'). He went on to study theology at Trinity College, Oxford. During his time at Oxford, Schneider was president of the Oxford University Liberal Democrats.

== Career ==
Schneider joined Think Africa Press in 2010, a role he held until he became the senior correspondent at New African in 2014. He has described his work at Think Africa Press as formative, in which he began to look at local issues using ideas that were critical of capitalism and imperialism. Schneider joined the Labour Party in May 2015 after Labour, under the leadership of Ed Miliband, failed to win government in the 2015 general election. He was a key figure within the left-wing grassroots movement Momentum, which was formed in October 2015 as a support group for Jeremy Corbyn, who had been elected Labour leader the previous month. The group also played a significant role in the 2016 campaign to re-elect Corbyn after a leadership challenge. Following their success in this campaign, Schneider was appointed as Director of Strategic Communications for the office of the Leader of the Opposition in October 2016.

Schneider has written articles for publications such as The Independent, the New Statesman, Novara Media, and LabourList. He states that he has read Marxist sociologist Ralph Miliband (father of Ed) and "learned from his critiques", but states that the academic was "writing in a different moment of history".

== Personal life ==
Schneider was criticised in 2016 for comments in 2006 in which he expressed support for Conservative Party candidates and policies, including a post on the right-wing ConservativeHome website urging a Conservative candidate to defeat a sitting Labour MP. Schneider says that his online comments do not reflect his current thinking, and that "People can and they do change their political views".

In 2024, Schneider became engaged to Downing Street Press Secretary Sophie Nazemi. He describes himself as "culturally Jewish".

== Bibliography ==
- Our Bloc: How We Win (Verso Books, 2022)
