= Henry James (disambiguation) =

Henry James (1843–1916) was an American author.

Henry James may also refer to:

- Henry James (Regius Professor) (died 1717), English priest and theologian
- Sir Henry James (British Army officer) (1803–1877), director-general of the Ordnance Survey
- Henry James Sr. (1811–1882), American theologian, father of the author
- Henry James, 1st Baron James of Hereford (1828–1911), English lawyer and statesman
- Sir H. E. M. James (Henry Evan Murchison James, 1846–1923), British officer in the Indian Civil Service, explorer and writer
- Henry James (dean of Bangor) (1864–1949), dean of Bangor Cathedral, 1934–1940
- Henry James (biographer) (1879–1947), winner of the 1931 Pulitzer Prize for Biography or Autobiography, nephew of the author
- Henry James (basketball) (born 1965), American basketball player
- Henry C. James, Australian writer
- Henry James (civil servant) (1919–1998), British civil servant

== See also ==
- Harry James (disambiguation)
