= Acklams Coaches =

Coach and bus operator based in the East Riding of Yorkshire, England

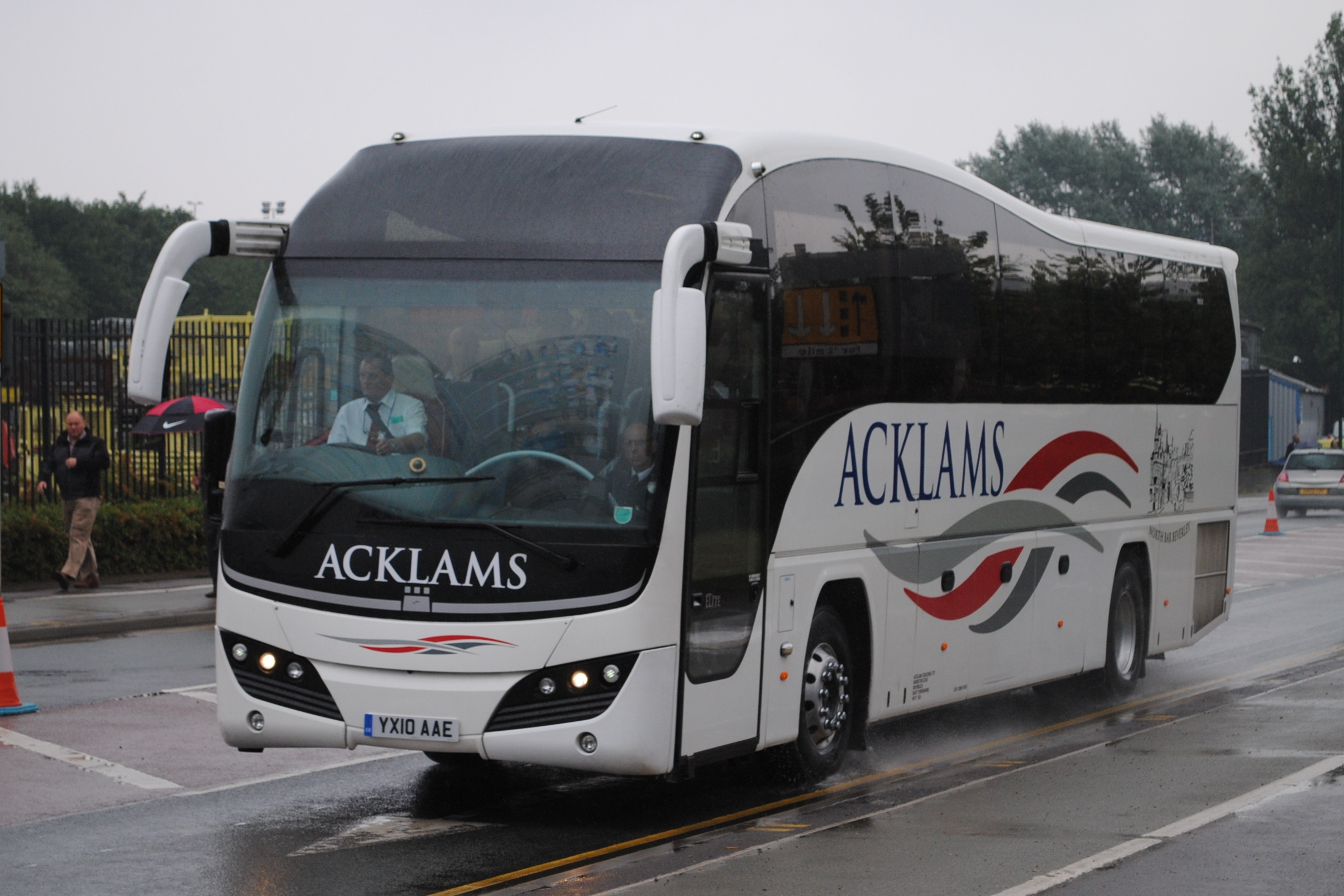
- Acklams Coaches Volvo B9R Plaxton Elite outside Wembley Stadium in August 2013
- Founded: 1952; 74 years ago
- Headquarters: Beverley, East Riding of Yorkshire; England
- Service area: East Riding of Yorkshire; Kingston upon Hull
- Service type: Coach holidays, escorted tours and private hire
- Director: Alan Acklam
- Website: acklamscoaches.co.uk

Acklams Coaches is a coach tour operator and bus operator based in Beverley, East Riding of Yorkshire, England.

== History ==
Acklams Coaches was initially founded by Bernard Acklam as Alpha Taxis in 1952, operating six to eight taxis around the Beverley area. The company would expand in the late 1960s to provide private hire minibus services following Bernard's son Paul joining the business.

The company's first coach was bought in 1980. When this coach was written off in an accident in Bishop Burton in 1998, Acklams began expanding their fleet by acquiring second-hand coaches, and from 2000 onwards, began purchasing new coaches every year. Acklams subsequently expanded into providing event transport and coach tours, operating over 250 "door to door" coach holidays across the United Kingdom and Europe by 2019, and would acquire the operations of Kingston upon Hull-based Jim Bell Coaches in 2016 and Driffield-based BusKing in 2019.

Following a short illness, director Paul Acklam died in January 2022. The business was passed onto his son Alan Acklam.

== Operations and fleet ==
Acklams Coaches predominantly offer private hire and escorted coach tours, although from 1992 to 2022, the company operated bus services on contract from East Riding of Yorkshire Council, mostly in the Beverley area as well as serving coastal East Riding communities. In October 2022, however, with the exception of one service in Bridlington that will cease operation in September 2023, Acklams Coaches ceased operating contracted bus services, with the operator's routes either contracted to other operators or withdrawn entirely.

Acklams Coaches operates a wide variety of coaches for a range of work, including shorter school services, sports team coaches and multi-day excursions across continental Europe. A large amount of the coaching fleet consists of Plaxton-bodied coaches on Volvo chassis, including three "interdeck" Plaxton Elite is, a number of conventional Elites and a Plaxton Panorama. Most Acklams coaches are painted white, however some from the 'Elite Travel' executive fleet are painted black with silver fleetnames, the name originating from the aforementioned Plaxton coach.

The company also operates a small fleet of new and second-hand single and double-deck buses, with buses purchased new including Alexander Dennis Enviro400s, an Alexander Dennis Enviro200 MMC for Bridlington bus services, and an Optare Solo SR.

=== 'Brexit bus' ===
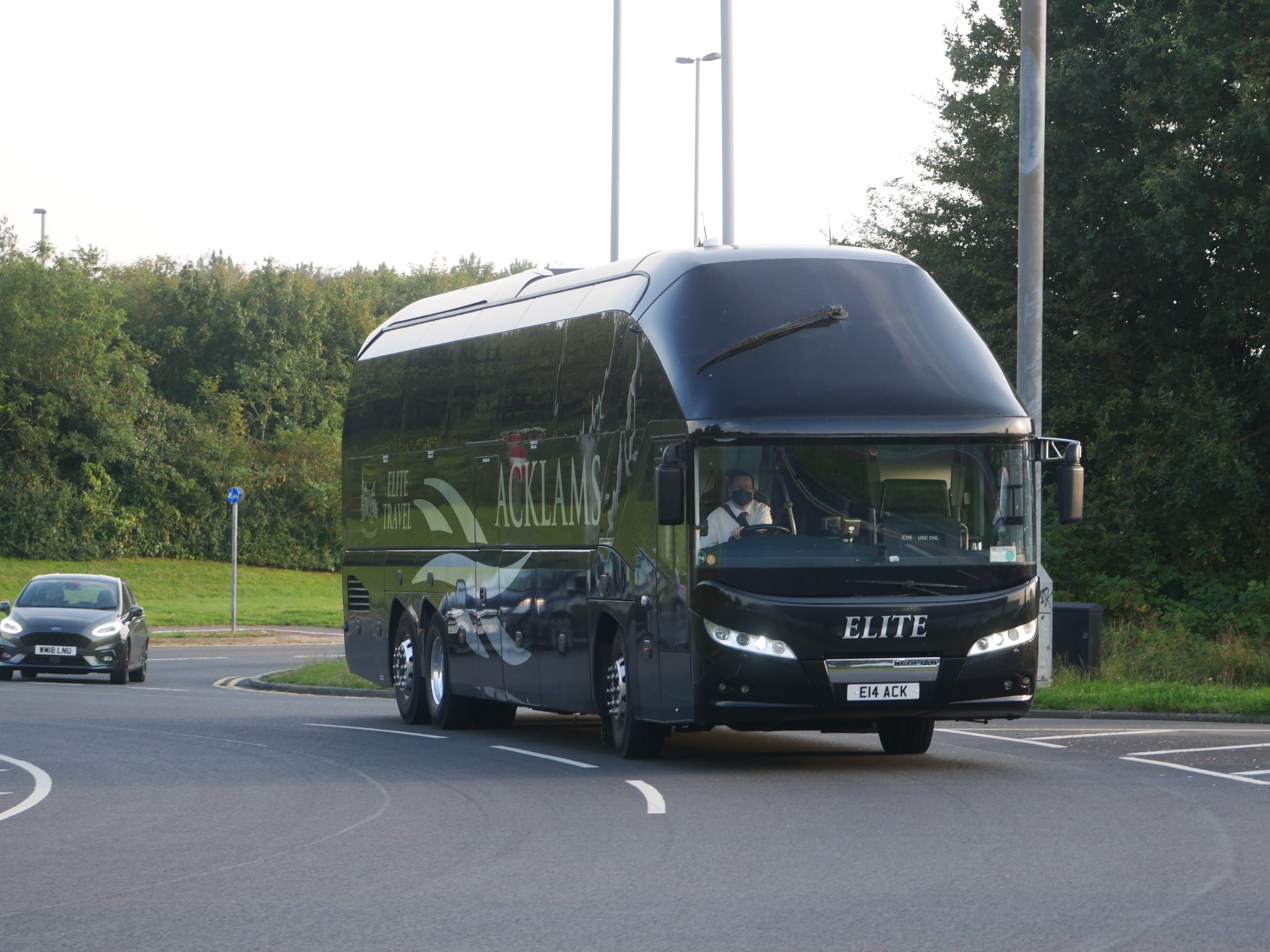
The former Vote Leave 'Brexit Bus', a Neoplan Starliner seen in Acklams' Elite Travel livery in September 2020

Among Acklams' Elite Travel fleet is a Neoplan Starliner team coach, which was hired by the Vote Leave campaign in the run-up to the 2016 United Kingdom European Union membership referendum. Nicknamed the 'Brexit bus' during the campaign, the coach was wrapped red and featured statements attributed to former Mayor of London Boris Johnson claiming the UK would "take back control" of £350 million per week that was being sent to the European Union, proposing to invest this money into the National Health Service; the claim was ruled to be false, but an attempted private prosecution in 2019 to convict Johnson for misconduct was thrown out of court.

Following the referendum campaign, Acklams Coaches hired out the Neoplan coach to a number of different customers, including environmental organisation Greenpeace, who recreated the Vote Leave branding for a campaign outside the Palace of Westminster three weeks after the referendum, Will Young's touring crew for the 2016 Glastonbury Festival, the Pakistan national cricket team and challenger bank Monese.
