= Henry James (civil servant) =

British civil servant (1919–1998)

Downing Street Press Secretary
- In office 1979–1979
- Prime Minister: Margaret Thatcher
- Preceded by: Sir Tom McCaffrey
- Succeeded by: Bernard Ingham

Personal details
- Born: Henry James; 12 December 1919 Alum Rock, Birmingham, England
- Died: 10 November 1998 (aged 78) Richmond, Surrey, England
- Spouse: Sylvia Bickell (m. 1949)
- Children: None
- Education: King Edward VI School
- Alma mater: The University of Birmingham
- Occupation: Civil servant

Henry James (12 December 1919 – 10 November 1998) was a British former civil servant who served as Downing Street Press Secretary to four prime ministers, most notably Margaret Thatcher during the first year of her premiership in 1979.

== Early life ==
Henry James was born in Alum Rock, Birmingham and educated at King Edward VI School. He went on to read maths at The University of Birmingham.

== Career ==
His career began at the Ministry of Health in 1938. A decade later he found himself as editor of the Ministry of National Insurance publication The Window and both London correspondent and drama critic for the Birmingham News from 1947–1951.

Between 1955 and 1961 he was head of film, television and radio at the Admiralty. In total he spent 32 years with the government information services and served for four years as the head of the Central Office of Information.

In later life Henry James became the first director general of the National Association of Pension Funds, director general for the European Federation for Retirement Provision and served as president of the Institute of Public Relations.

== Personal life ==
He was married to Sylvia Bickell from 1949 until her death in 1989. They had no children.

Government offices
Preceded by Sir Tom McCaffrey	Downing Street Press Secretary; 1979–1979	Succeeded by Bernard Ingham
