= Evans baronets =

Set index for Evans baronets

There have been five baronetcies created for persons with the surname Evans, one in the Baronetage of Ireland and four in the Baronetage of the United Kingdom. All of the baronetcies are now extinct.

- Evans baronets of Kilcreene (1683)
- Evans baronets, of Allestree Hall (1887): see Sir William Evans, 1st Baronet (1821–1892)
- Evans baronets of Tubbendens (1902)
- Evans baronets of Wightwick (1920)
- Evans baronets of Rottingdean (1963): see Sir Harold Evans, 1st Baronet (1911–1983)

== See also ==
- Evans-Bevan baronets
- Evans-Freke baronets, under Baron Carbery
- Evans-Tipping baronets, formerly Gwynne-Evans baronets
