= 1970 Prime Minister's Resignation Honours =

British government recognitions

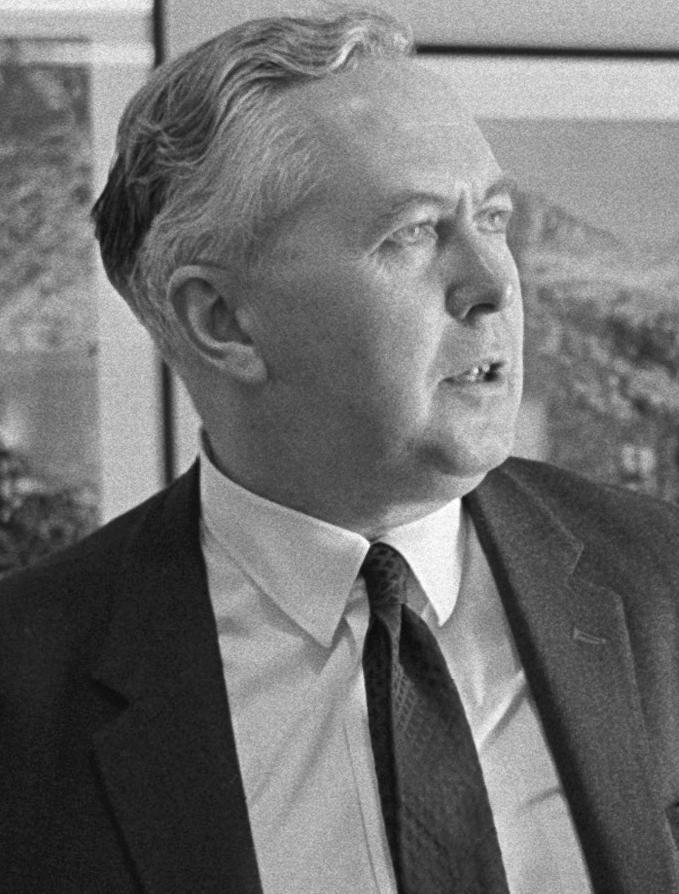
Harold Wilson in 1964

The 1970 Prime Minister's Resignation Honours were officially announced in The London Gazette of 7 August 1970 and marked the June 1970 electoral defeat of the Prime Minister, Harold Wilson.

== Life peers ==
- The Rt. Hon. Alice Martha Bacon, CBE, Member of Parliament for Leeds North East, 1945–1955 and Leeds South East, 1955–1970. Minister of State, Home Office, 1964–1967. Minister of State, Department of Education and Science, 1967–1970.
- The Rt. Hon. Jennie Lee, Member of Parliament for North Lanarkshire, 1929–1931 and Cannock, 1945–1970. Parliamentary Secretary, Ministry of Public Building and Works 1964–1965. Parliamentary Under Secretary of State, Department of Education and Science 1965–1967. Minister of State, Department of Education and Science, 1967–1970.
- Eirene Lloyd White, Member of Parliament for East Flint, 1950–1970. Parliamentary Under Secretary of State, Colonial Office, 1964–1966. Minister of State, Foreign Office, 1966–1967. Minister of State, Welsh Office, 1967–1970.
- The Rt. Hon. George Alfred Brown, Member of Parliament for Belper, 1945–1970. Parliamentary Secretary, Ministry of Agriculture and Fisheries, 1947–1951. Minister of Works, 1951. First Secretary of State and Secretary of State for Economic Affairs, 1964–1966. Secretary of State for Foreign Affairs, 1966–1968.
- The Rt. Hon. Harold Davies, Member of Parliament for Leek, 1945–1970. Parliamentary Secretary, Ministry of Pensions and National Insurance, 1964–1966 and to the Ministry of Social Security, 1966–1967. Parliamentary Private Secretary to Harold Wilson, 1967–1970.
- The Rt. Hon. John Diamond, Member of Parliament for Manchester Blackley, 1945–1951, and for Gloucester, 1957–1970. Chief Secretary to the Treasury, 1964–1970.
- The Rt. Hon. (Arthur William James) Anthony Greenwood, Member of Parliament for Heywood and Radcliffe, 1946–1950 and for Rossendale, 1950–1970. Secretary of State for the Colonies, 1964–1965. Minister of Overseas Development, 1965–1966. Minister of Housing and Local Government, 1966–1970.
- Julian Ward Snow, Member of Parliament for Portsmouth Central, 1945–1950 and for Lichfield and Tamworth (UK Parliament constituency), 1950–1970. Vice-Chamberlain of the Household, 1945–1946. A Lord Commissioner of the Treasury, 1946–1950. Parliamentary Secretary, Ministry of Aviation, 1966–1967. Parliamentary Secretary, Ministry of Health, 1967–1968. Parliamentary Under Secretary of State, Department of Health and Social Security, 1968–1969.

== Privy Counsellors ==
- David Hedley Ennals, Member of Parliament for Dover, 1964–1970. Parliamentary Under Secretary of State for the Army, 1966–1967. Parliamentary Under Secretary of State, Home Office, 1967–1968. Minister of State, Department of Health and Social Security, 1968–1970.
- Ernest Fernyhough, MP, Member of Parliament for Jarrow since 1947. Parliamentary Private Secretary Harold Wilson, 1964–1967. Parliamentary Secretary, Ministry of Labour, 1967–1968 and Parliamentary Under Secretary of State, Department of Employment and Productivity, 1968–1969.

== Knights Bachelor ==
- John Desmond Brayley, MC, DL, Chairman, Canning Town Glass Works Ltd.
- Trevor Denby Lloyd-Hughes, Formerly Chief Information Adviser to the Government.
- Joseph Kagan, founder and chairman of Kagan Textiles Ltd.
- Leslie Maurice Lever, Member of Parliament for Manchester Ardwick, 1950–1970.
- (Herbert Richard) Harry Nicholas, OBE, General Secretary of the Labour Party.
- Kenneth Selby, Chairman, Bath and Portland Group Ltd.
- Joseph Ellis Stone, MRCS, LRCP, General Practitioner.

== Order of the British Empire ==
=== Dames Commander (DBE) ===
- Sara Elizabeth Barker, Formerly National Agent, The Labour Party.

=== Commanders (CBE) ===
- Derek Henry Andrews, Private Secretary to the Prime Minister since 1966.
- Percy Clark, Director of Publicity, The Labour Party.
- Marjorie Halls, Widow of Michael Halls, Principal Private Secretary to the Prime Minister, 1966–1970.
- Ronald George Hayward, National Agent, The Labour Party.
- George Holt, Chief Press Officer, Prime Minister's Office.
- Marcia Matilda Williams, Private Secretary to Harold Wilson.

=== Officers (OBE) ===
- George Louis Gaunt, Committee Clerk, Parliamentary Labour Party.
- Roger James Dawe, Private Secretary to the Prime Minister, 1966–1970.
- Alfred Richman, Journalist.
- Miss Beryl Pauline Urquhart, Committee Clerk, Parliamentary Labour Party.

=== Members (MBE) ===
- Phyllis Edith Birt, Secretary and Personal Assistant, Parliamentary Labour Party.
- Harry James Fowler, Actor.
- Gordon Charles George Fryer, Inspector, Metropolitan Police.
- William Henry George Green, Formerly Head of the Despatch Department, Transport House.
- Elizabeth Guy, Formerly Head of the Bookshop, Transport House.
- Elsie Helena Selley, Formerly Head of the Directory Department, Transport House.
- Ruth Margaret Sharpe, Private and Constituency Secretary to James Callaghan.

== British Empire Medal (BEM) ==
- Chief Wren Steward (O) Margaret Frances Fenton, formerly Chief Steward at Chequers.
- Thora Pollard, Housekeeper to Harold Wilson and Mary Wilson.
