= 1964 Prime Minister's Resignation Honours =

British government recognitions

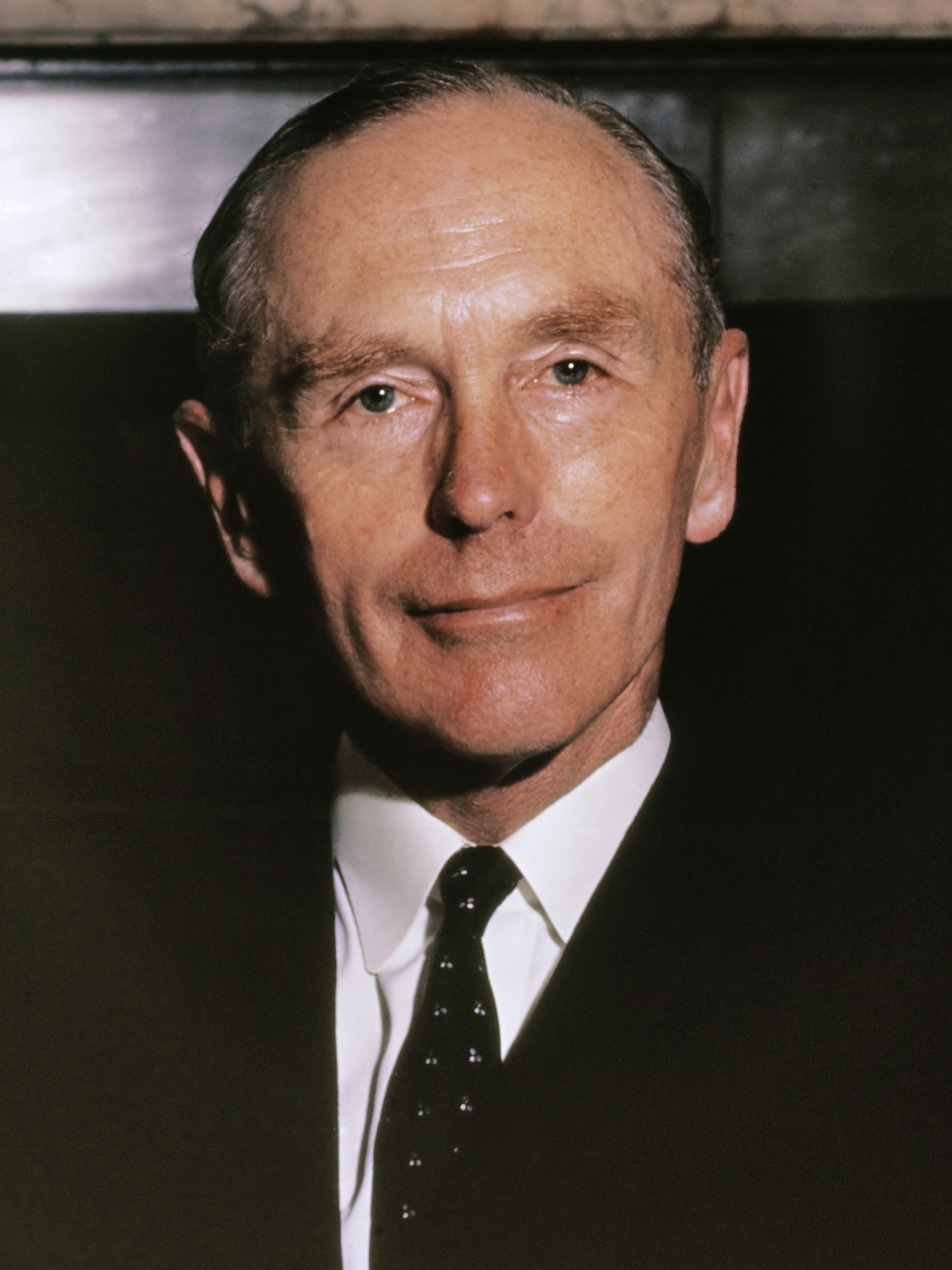
Alec Douglas-Home in 1963

The 1964 Prime Minister's Resignation Honours were officially announced in the London Gazette of 27 November 1964 and marked the October 1964 electoral defeat of the Prime Minister, Sir Alec Douglas-Home.

== Baronetcies ==
- Francis Fenwick Pearson, MBE, MP, Conservative Member of Parliament for Clitheroe since 1959. A Lord Commissioner of the Treasury, 1962–1964. Parliamentary Private Secretary to Sir Alec Douglas-Home, 1963–1964. For political and public services.
- The Rt. Hon. Martin Redmayne, DSO, TD, MP, Conservative Member of Parliament for Rushcliffe since 1950. A Government Whip, 1951; a Lord Commissioner of the Treasury, 1953–1959, Deputy Government Chief Whip, 1953–1959; Parliamentary Secretary to the Treasury and Government Chief Whip, 1959–1964. For political and public services.

== Order of St Michael and St George ==
=== Companion (CMG) ===
- John Oliver Wright, DSC, Private Secretary to the Earl of Home when Foreign Secretary, 1960–1963 and to Sir Alec Douglas-Home when Prime Minister, 1963–1964.

== Order of the British Empire ==
=== Commanders (CBE) ===
- John Brett Fletcher, MBE, Solicitor and Managing Trustee of the Dorneywood Trust.
- John Francis Hewitt, Secretary for Appointments to the Prime Minister since 1961.

=== Officers (OBE) ===
- John Dudley Groves, chief information officer (B) in the Prime Minister's Office from 1962 to 1964.

=== Members (MBE) ===
- Mabel Ethel Dodd, Clerical Officer (Secretary) in the office of the Parliamentary Secretary to the Treasury, since 1958.
- John Thomas Marling, A member of the House of Commons staff in charge of the Conservative Chief Whip's messengers.

== British Empire Medal (BEM) ==
- Alice Mable Florence Lewis, Telephonist in the Prime Minister's Office since 1951.
- Bernard Walton Pettifer, Head Government Butler since 1953.
- Robert Andrew Watt Shearer, Sir Alec Douglas-Home's official driver for many years.
- Sidney Frederick Jack Toogood, Ex-Detective Inspector, Metropolitan Police: Sir Alec Douglas-Home's detective from 1960 to 1964.
- Edward James Wren, Detective-Sergeant, Metropolitan Police. Sir Alec Douglas-Home's detective from 1960 to 1963.

== See also ==
- 1964 Dissolution Honours
