= William D. Clark =

English economist

Downing Street Press Secretary
- In office 1955–1956
- Prime Minister: Anthony Eden
- Preceded by: Fife Clark
- Succeeded by: Alfred Richardson

Personal details
- Born: William Donaldson Clark; 28 June 1916 Haltwhistle, Northumberland, England
- Died: 27 June 1985 (aged 68) Cuxham, Oxfordshire, England
- Education: Oundle School
- Alma mater: Oriel College, Oxford; University of Chicago

William Donaldson Clark (28 July 1916 – 27 June 1985) was an English economist and public servant.

== Early life ==
Clark was born on 28 July 1916, in the Northumbrian town of Haltwhistle, the son of John McClare Clark and Marion Jackson. He was educated at the independent Oundle School and graduated from Oriel College, Oxford with a First Class degree in modern history. Clark attended the University of Chicago in 1938 as a Commonwealth Fellow. During World War II he worked doing public relations for Britain in the United States.

== Career ==
Clark became the London editor of Encyclopædia Britannica in 1946, a post he left for journalism in 1949. In the early 1950s he became a foreign affairs correspondent for The Observer. He became press secretary to Anthony Eden on 1 October 1955, but resigned shortly after the Suez Crisis, on 7 November 1956. In 1968 he said that The Manchester Guardian's anti-Suez leading articles were one of the main reasons why Eden asked for the BBC to be bought under direct control of the Government.

The first director of the Overseas Development Institute from 1960 to 1968, Clark then joined the World Bank and from 1974 to 1980 was their Vice President in Charge of External Affairs.

== Death ==
Clark died on the night of 27 June 1985 of liver cancer at his home in Cuxham, Oxfordshire. He was survived by his two brothers Kenneth and Nicholas.

Government offices
Preceded by Fife Clark	Downing Street Press Secretary; 1955–1956	Succeeded by Alfred Richardson
