= Allegra Stratton =

British journalist (born 1980)

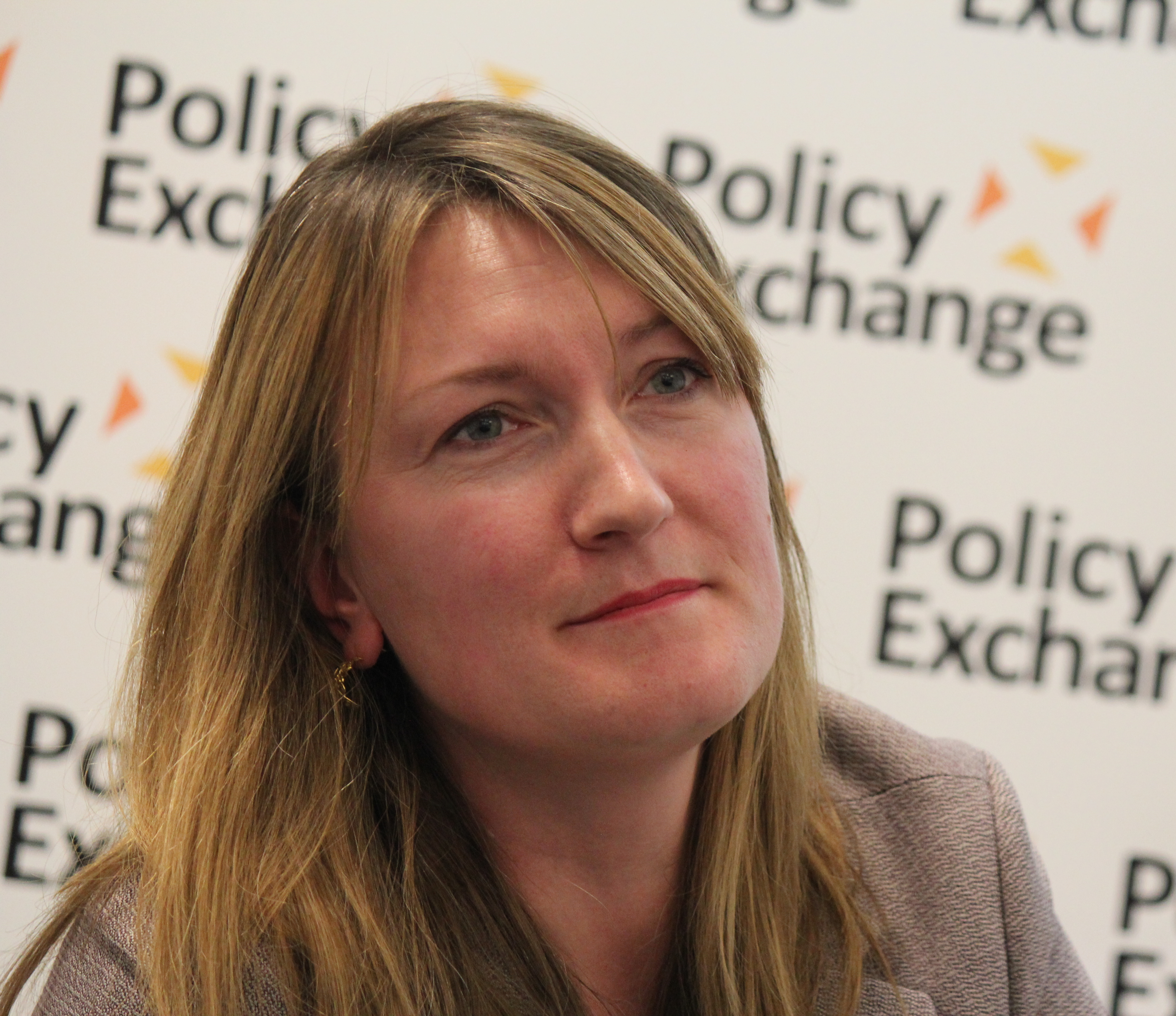
- Stratton in 2015

Downing Street Press Secretary
- In office 8 October 2020 – 20 April 2021
- Prime Minister: Boris Johnson
- Preceded by: Rob Oxley
- Succeeded by: Rosie Bate-Williams

Personal details
- Born: Allegra Elizabeth Jane Stratton; 10 April 1980 (age 46) Nottingham, England
- Party: Conservative
- Spouse: James Forsyth (m. 2011)
- Children: 2
- Education: Emmanuel College, Cambridge
- Occupation: Political aide; journalist; writer

Allegra Elizabeth Jane Stratton (born 10 April 1980) is a British former political aide, journalist, and writer who served as Downing Street Press Secretary under Boris Johnson from November 2020 to April 2021.

Stratton worked for The Guardian as a political correspondent until joining the BBC in 2012, where she was political editor of BBC Two's Newsnight from 2012 to 2016. She worked for ITV as national editor of ITV News from 2016 to 2018 and co-presenter of Peston on Sunday from 2016 to 2018. After leaving journalism, she became a spokesperson for the British government. She was Chancellor Rishi Sunak's Director of Strategic Communications at the Treasury from April until October 2020, when she became the press secretary for 10 Downing Street.

In April 2021, Stratton was appointed as spokesperson for COP26 President Alok Sharma. She resigned from this post in December 2021 after footage was released of her at a December 2020 press conference rehearsal, in which she joked with colleagues about a Christmas party that secretly took place at 10 Downing Street while the country was in a COVID-19 lockdown.

== Early life ==
Stratton was born in Nottingham on 10 April 1980, one of four children born to a translator father and textile artist mother. She grew up in the Chiswick area of London. She was named after Allegra Byron, a daughter of the poet Lord Byron. She attended Chiswick Community School and Latymer Upper School, an independent school in the Hammersmith district of London, before studying archaeology and anthropology at Emmanuel College, Cambridge.

== Career ==
=== Journalism ===
Stratton worked as a producer for the BBC Television current affairs programme Newsnight, on the foreign desk at The Times, and wrote for The Independent and the New Statesman. She then joined The Guardian as a political correspondent, presenting the newspaper's Politics Weekly podcast with journalist Tom Clark.

In 2006, Stratton published a non-fiction book, Muhajababes, that explored the youth culture of the Middle East and the contradictions of the modern life of young adults in Muslim societies. The book was based on Stratton's experiences of travelling in the region in 2005.

Stratton returned to the BBC on 20 February 2012, as political editor of Newsnight, replacing Michael Crick who left to become a political correspondent for Channel 4. In May the same year, she faced criticism for a Newsnight interview with a single mother who was claiming housing benefit. The interviewee described feeling "humiliated" by Stratton, who misrepresented her as unemployed. Private Eye magazine reported that Stratton had chosen the single mother over several other interviewees offered, including a couple with four children who had lost their jobs and faced homelessness. This incident led to a 20,000-signature petition soliciting an apology from Stratton and Newsnight. Following an official complaint to the BBC's Editorial Complaints Unit, a correction and apology was issued by Peter Rippon, the editor of Newsnight, in August.

In November 2015, the BBC announced that Stratton was leaving to join ITV News as its national editor. She made her first appearance on ITV's News at Ten in January 2016 and co-presented Peston on Sunday with Robert Peston until April 2018, when she departed to spend weekends with her children.

After a six-month hiatus, in June 2022, Stratton joined Bloomberg News as UK contributing editor, writing an afternoon newsletter called "Readout".

=== Government communications ===
Stratton left ITV News in April 2020 to become Director of Strategic Communications at the Treasury under Chancellor Rishi Sunak. Six months later, in October 2020, she was given the newly created role of Downing Street Press Secretary, to present proposed televised press briefings initially scheduled for launch in November 2020. The briefings were subsequently delayed to January 2021 and it was reported that they would take place when the House of Commons was sitting on Mondays, Tuesdays and Thursdays. The January launch date was repeatedly pushed back due to the COVID-19 lockdowns and on 20 April it was announced that the briefings would be scrapped entirely, with Stratton instead becoming the spokesperson for the COP26 summit that was held in Glasgow in November 2021. In this role, she made comments that a diesel car suited her lifestyle better than an electric car, that not rinsing plates before putting them in the dishwasher would help the environment, and that the public should join the Green Party in order to combat the climate crisis. During the conference The Guardian reported she "stayed in the background" and had "an unclear role".

==== 2020 Downing Street Christmas party controversy ====
On 7 December 2021, ITV News released a video of a mock press conference from 22 December 2020, in which Stratton and other Downing Street staff made joking references to a Christmas gathering at 10 Downing Street that took place four days earlier. In the leaked 47-second clip, filmed from the Downing Street Press Briefing Room, Stratton and the other staff joked about the "fictional party" being just "cheese and wine" and a "business meeting" with "no social distancing". BBC News reported that the event had "several dozen" attendees and that "party games were played, food and drink were served, and the party went on past midnight". At the time of the alleged party, London was under COVID-19 tier 3 lockdown restrictions. The restrictions prohibited indoor gatherings of more than six people, with exceptions for certain work-related activities.

The day after the ITV story was broadcast, Prime Minister Boris Johnson apologised for the video during Prime Minister's Questions, describing himself as "furious" about it, but continued to deny that a party had taken place and declared that an investigation would be undertaken by Cabinet Secretary Simon Case. Three hours later, Stratton resigned from her position as government spokesperson for the COP26 summit and apologised for her remarks which she asserted she would regret "for the rest of [her] days". On 15 December, a picture was leaked showing Johnson taking part in a Christmas quiz at 10 Downing Street around the same time that the parties happened in 2020; the quiz was virtual and happened online, but the picture showed Johnson sitting in a room with at least two other people.

== Personal life ==
Stratton is married to James Forsyth, former political editor of The Spectator magazine and former Political Secretary to the Prime Minister, Rishi Sunak. They have two children and live in the Canonbury area of north London. Future Prime Minister Rishi Sunak was best man at their wedding in 2011, and they and Sunak are godparents to each other's children.

In November 2020, Stratton told The Sunday Telegraph that she had voted for the Labour Party, the Green Party, and the Liberal Democrats in the past, but later supported Brexit and described herself as "a Johnson Tory". She is said to be an ally and friend of Johnson's wife Carrie.

== Publications ==
- Stratton, Allegra (2006). Muhajababes (first ed.). London: Constable. ISBN 978-1-84529-427-4.

Media offices
Preceded by Michael Crick	Political Editor: Newsnight; 2012–2016	Succeeded by Nicholas Watt
Government offices
Preceded by Rob Oxley	Downing Street Press Secretary; 2020–2021	Succeeded by Rosie Bate-Williams
