= Sir Walter Evans, 1st Baronet =

English hydraulic engineer, politician and public servant

Sir Walter Evans Bt
- Born: Walter Harry Evans; 19 May 1872; Wolverhampton, Staffordshire, England
- Died: 7 November 1954 (aged 82)
- Occupations: Hydraulic engineer, public servant

Sir Walter Harry Evans, 1st Baronet (19 May 1872 – 7 November 1954) was an English hydraulic engineer, politician, and public servant.

Evans was born in Wolverhampton, son of Joseph Evans. He was a member of Staffordshire County Council for many years. In the 1920 New Year Honours, he was created a baronet, of Wightwick, near Wolverhampton, in the County of Stafford, for his services to the war savings committees during the First World War, with the letters patent being issued on 31 January 1920.

He married Margaret Mary Dickens in 1907. They had one son and two daughters. He was succeeded in the baronetcy by his son, Anthony.

== Footnotes ==
Baronetage of the United Kingdom
New creation	Baronet (of Wightwick); 1920–1954	Succeeded by Anthony Adney Evans
