= 1964 Dissolution Honours =

British government recognitions

The 1964 Dissolution Honours were officially announced on 27 November 1964 and marked the dissolution of parliament following the 1964 General Election.

The recipients of honours are displayed here as they were styled before their new honour.

== Hereditary Peerages ==
=== Viscounts ===
- Rt Hon. The Lord Dilhorne, Conservative Member of Parliament for Daventry 1943–1950; and for South Northamptonshire, 1950–1962. Solicitor General for England and Wales, 1951–1954. Attorney General for England and Wales, 1954–1962. Lord Chancellor, 1962–1964. For political and public services.

=== Barons ===
- Rt Hon. Frederick James Erroll TD MP, Conservative Member of Parliament for Altrincham and Sale since 1945. Parliamentary Secretary, Ministry of Supply, 1955–1956; and to Board of Trade, 1956–1958; Economic Secretary to the Treasury, 1958–1959; Minister of State, Board of Trade, 1959–1961; President of the Board of Trade, 1961–1963; Minister of Power, 1963–1964. For political and public services.
- Sir Hugh Fraser Bt JP DL, Chairman and Managing Director, House of Fraser Ltd. For political and public services.
- Sir Robert Villiers Grimston Bt, Conservative Member of Parliament for Westbury, 1931–1964. Deputy Chairman of Ways and Means, 1962–1964. For political and public services.
- John Granville Morrison TD DL MP, Conservative Member of Parliament for Salisbury since 1942. Chairman, Conservative Members (1922) Committee, 1955–1964. For political and public services.
- Sir Robert Burnham Renwick Bt KBE, Partner in W. Greenwell and Co. For political and public services.
- Lieutenant-Colonel Michael Henry Colin Hughes-Young MC, Conservative Member of Parliament for Wandsworth Central, 1955–1964. A Lord Commissioner of the Treasury, 1958–1962 and Deputy Government Chief Whip, 1959–1964. Treasurer of the Household, 1962–1964. For political and public services.

== Life Peerages ==
- Dame Barbara Muriel Brooke DBE, Joint Vice-Chairman, Conservative Party Organisation, 1954–1964. For political and public services.
- The Honourable Evelyn Violet Elizabeth Emmett JP MP, Conservative Member of Parliament for East Grinstead since 1955. Chairman, National Union of Conservatives, 1955–1956. For political and public services.

== Privy Counsellors ==
- Rt Hon. The Lord Chesham, Parliamentary Secretary to Ministry of Transport, 1959–1964.
- Edward Dillon Lott du Cann MP, Conservative Member of Parliament for Taunton since 1956. Economic Secretary to the Treasury, 1962–1963. Minister of State, Board of Trade, 1963–1964.
- Sir Kenneth William Murray Pickthorn Bt MP, Conservative Member of Parliament for Cambridge University, 1935–1950; and for Carlton since 1950. Parliamentary Secretary, Ministry of Education, 1951–1954.

== Baronetcies ==
- Graeme Bell Finlay ERD, Conservative Member of Parliament for Epping, 1951–1964. A Lord Commissioner of the Treasury, 1959–1960; Vice-Chamberlain of the Household, 1960–1964. For political and public services.

== Knights Bachelor ==
- Frederic Mackarness Bennett MP, Conservative Member of Parliament for Reading North, 1951–1955; and for Torquay since 1955. For political and public services.
- Wing Commander Eric Edward Bullus MP, Conservative Member of Parliament for Wembley North since 1950. For political and public services.
- Wing Commander Henry Algernon Langton DSO DFC. For political services in Devizes and Wessex.
- George Wilton Lee TD. For political and public services in Sheffield.
- Rupert Malise Speir MP, Conservative Member of Parliament for Hexham since 1951. For political and public services.

== Order of the Companions of Honour ==
- Rt Hon. Henry Brooke MP, Conservative Member of Parliament for Lewisham West 1938–1945; and for Hampstead since 1950. Financial Secretary to the Treasury, 1954–1957; Minister of Housing and Local Government, and Minister for Welsh Affairs, 1957–1961; Chief Secretary to the Treasury and Paymaster General, 1961–1962; Home Secretary 1962–1964. For political and public services.

== Order of the British Empire ==
=== Dames Commander (DBE) ===
- Joan Helen Vickers MBE MP, Conservative Member of Parliament for Plymouth Devonport since 1955. For political and public services.

=== Knights Commander (KBE) ===
- Rt Hon. David Lockhart-Mure Renton TD QC MP, National Liberal Member of Parliament for Huntingdonshire, 1945–1950; and National Liberal and Conservative Member for Huntingdon since 1950. Parliamentary Secretary to Ministry of Fuel and Power, 1955–1957; to Ministry of Power, 1957–1958; Joint Parliamentary Under Secretary of State, Home Office, 1958–1961; Minister of State, Home Office, 1961–1962. For political and public services.
- Rt Hon. The Earl St Aldwyn TD DL, Joint Parliamentary Secretary, Ministry of Agriculture, Fisheries and Food, 1954–1958. Captain of the Gentlemen-at-Arms and Government Chief Whip, House of Lords, 1958–1964. For political and public services.

=== Commanders (CBE) ===
- Reginald Thomas Glenny. For political services in Marylebone.
- George Hutchinson. For political services.
- Joan Florence Mary, Lady Newman. For political and public services in Hitchin.
- Rt Hon. The Lord Tweedsmuir OBE, Chairman, Joint East and Central African Board 1950–1952. President, Commonwealth and British Empire Chambers of Commerce 1955–1957. A Governor of the Commonwealth Institute since 1958. President, Institute of Export since 1963. For political and public services.

=== Officers (OBE) ===
- Peter Reginald George Horton. For political services.
- Brendon Straker Sewill. For political services.

=== Members (MBE) ===
- Kathleen Mary Bryant. For political services.
- Alexander Douglas Eastwood. For political services in Kingston-upon-Hull.

== See also ==
- 1964 Prime Minister's Resignation Honours
