= Evans baronets of Wightwick (1920) =

Baronetcy in the Baronetage of the United Kingdom

Escutcheon of the Evans baronets of Wightwick

The Evans baronetcy, of Wightwick near Wolverhampton in the County of Stafford, was created in the Baronetage of the United Kingdom on 31 January 1920 for the hydraulic engineer and politician Walter Evans. He was a member of the Staffordshire County Council for many years. The baronetcy was conferred on him for his services during the First World War.

The baronetcy became extinct on the death of his son, the 2nd Baronet, in 2017.

== Evans baronets, of Wightwick (1920) ==
- Sir Walter Harry Evans, 1st Baronet (1872–1954)
- Sir Anthony Adney Evans, 2nd Baronet (1922–2017)
