= Harold James =

Harold James may refer to:

- Harold James (archer) (1868–1948), British archer
- Harold James (Pennsylvania politician) (1942–2022), member of the Pennsylvania House of Representatives
- Harold James (historian) (born 1956), economic historian
- Gene James (Harold Gene James, 1925–1997), American basketball player
- Harold James (basketball coach), former Oklahoma A&M basketball coach

== See also ==
- Harry James (disambiguation)
