= Lizzie Loudon =

British political adviser

Downing Street Press Secretary
- In office 2016–2017
- Prime Minister: Theresa May
- Preceded by: Graeme Wilson
- Succeeded by: Paul Harrison

Lizzie Loudon is a British political adviser. She served as press secretary to Theresa May, before resigning in April 2017.

Loudon is a former employee of the Vote Leave campaign, adviser to Iain Duncan Smith and civil servant. In February 2017, she was described by The Spectator as "No 10's secret weapon".

Government offices
Preceded by Graeme Wilson	Downing Street Press Secretary; 2016-2017	Succeeded by Paul Harrison
