= Fife Clark =

British journalist and civil servant

Sir Thomas Fife Clark CBE
- Sir Thomas Fife Clark (1955)

Downing Street Press Secretary
- In office 1952–1955
- Prime Minister: Winston Churchill
- Preceded by: Reginald Bacon
- Succeeded by: William D. Clark

Personal details
- Born: 29 May 1907
- Died: 29 March 1985 (aged 77)

Sir Thomas Fife Clark CBE (29 May 1907 – 29 March 1985) was a British journalist and civil servant.

== Career ==
Clark served as Downing Street Press Secretary, between 1952 and 1955, under Prime Minister Winston Churchill. He then served as Director General of the Central Office of Information for almost seventeen years (1954–71). In this role, he produced long running campaigns for road safety and army recruitment as well as being in charge of the British Pavilions at the World Fairs.

== Honours ==
Clark was appointed a Commander of the Order of the British Empire (CBE) in the 1949 Birthday Honours, and was knighted in the 1965 Birthday Honours.

In 1971, Allen & Unwin published Sir Fife Clark's work, The Central Office of Information.

Government offices
Preceded by Reginald Bacon	Downing Street Press Secretary; 1952-1955	Succeeded by William D. Clark
