= James Forsyth (political aide) =

Political aide (born 1981)

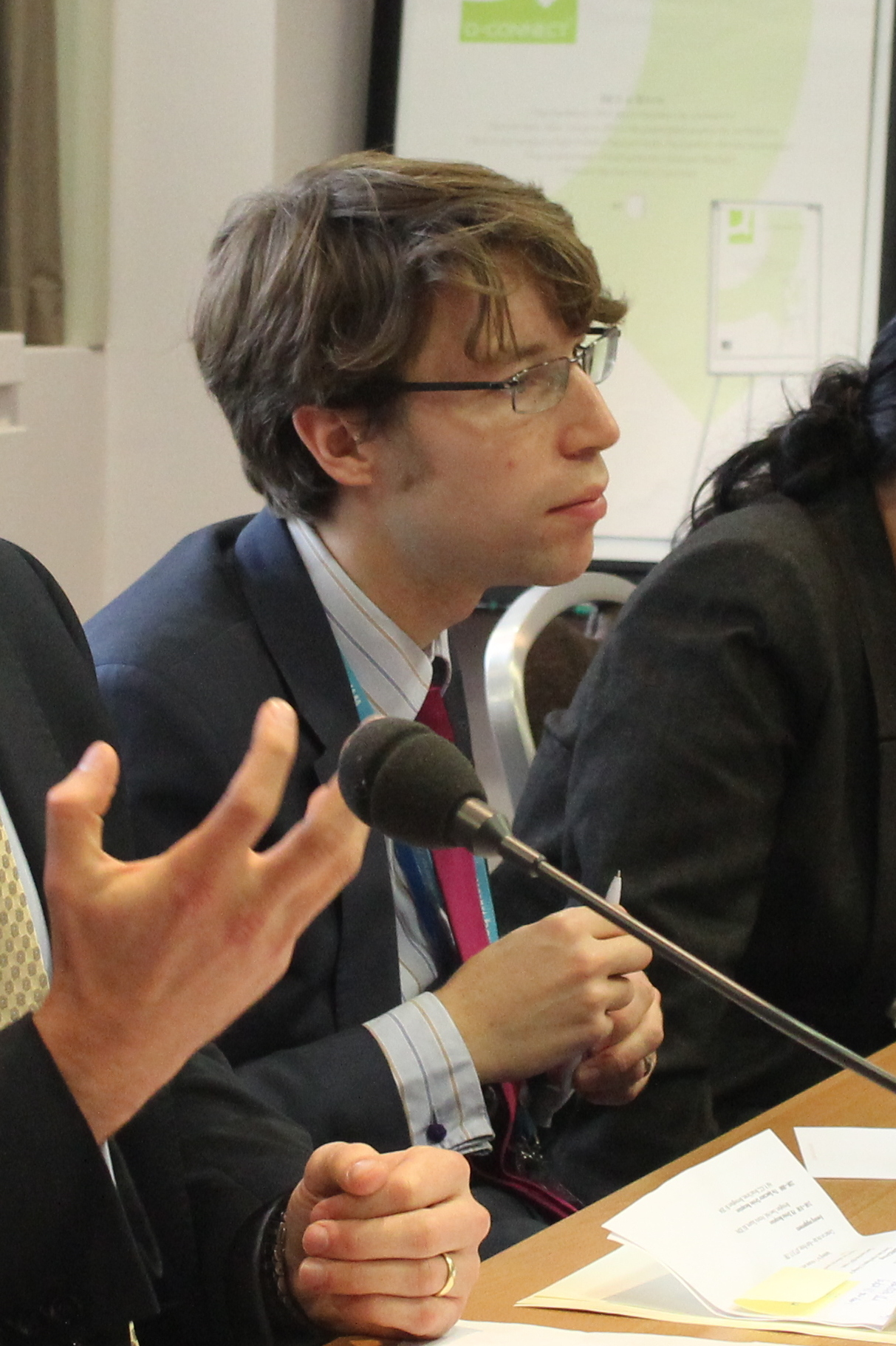
- Forsyth in 2012

Political Secretary to the Prime Minister of the United Kingdom
- In office 24 December 2022 – 5 July 2024
- Prime Minister: Rishi Sunak
- Preceded by: Sophie Jarvis

Personal details
- Born: 1981 (age 44–45) London, England
- Spouse: Allegra Stratton (m. 2011)
- Children: 2
- Education: Winchester College
- Alma mater: Jesus College, Cambridge
- Known for: The Spectator; The Sun; Mail on Sunday

James Forsyth (born 1981) is a British political aide and former political journalist. After serving as political editor of The Spectator magazine since 2009, he was Political Secretary to the Prime Minister of the United Kingdom, Rishi Sunak, from 2022 until July 2024.

== Early life ==
Forsyth attended Winchester College and Jesus College, Cambridge.

== Career ==
Forsyth joined Foreign Policy magazine as assistant editor before launching Coffee House, The Spectator's political blog, in 2007. He was appointed deputy editor, online, of The Spectator in 2008 and political editor in 2009.

He was also a weekly columnist for The Times on a Friday, previously writing for The Sun on Saturdays and previously the Mail on Sunday.

He is an advisory board member of the ResPublica think tank in Westminster.

On 24 December 2022, Forsyth was hired by Prime Minister Rishi Sunak as his political secretary.

In 2023 the New Statesman named Forsyth as the eighth most powerful right-wing figure in the UK, describing him as wielding "significant influence over key decisions".

== Personal life ==
Forsyth has been married to the journalist Allegra Stratton since 2011. She was appointed as the Downing Street Press Secretary under Prime Minister Boris Johnson in November 2020. They live in Canonbury, Islington with their two children.

He is close friends with former Prime Minister and Conservative Party leader Rishi Sunak; they were contemporaries at Winchester College and are godparents to each other's children. Sunak was best man at Forsyth's wedding to Stratton in 2011.

Media offices
Preceded by Fraser Nelson	Political Editor of The Spectator; 2009–2022	Succeeded by Katy Balls
Government offices
Preceded by Sophie Jarvis	Political Secretary to the Prime Minister; 2022–2024	Vacant
