= Sophie Nazemi =

British special adviser

Downing Street Press Secretary
- In office July 2024 – July 2026
- Prime Minister: Keir Starmer
- Preceded by: Lucy Noakes
- Succeeded by: John Stevens

Personal details
- Party: Labour
- Spouse: James Schneider

Sophie Nazemi is a British political aide. She served as Downing Street Press Secretary in the Starmer ministry from 2024 to 2026.

== Biography ==
Nazemi graduated from King's College London. While there she was co-chair of Kings College Labour Society. She was an organiser with Labour Students and Young Labour. Nazemi campaigned in the 2016 United Kingdom European Union membership referendum for remain. She was a spokesperson for Momentum. She was an events organiser for the group.

Nazemi has worked as a staffer for the Labour Party. She is one of the longest serving aides. In 2017 she was appointed to their media team. She served in the press office for Jeremy Corbyn. She was also a special adviser. When Keir Starmer was Leader of the Opposition she was communications director. She worked in the office of Angela Rayner.

== Personal life ==
Nazemi is married to James Schneider.
