= Evans baronets of Kilcreene (1683) =

Extinct baronetcy in the Baronetage of Ireland

Escutcheon of the Evans baronets of Kilcreene

The Evans baronetcy, of Kilcreene in the County of Kilkenny, was created in the Baronetage of Ireland on 19 February 1683 for William Evans. He was the son of Thomas Evans (died 1677), Member of the Parliament of Ireland for Kilkenny City.

Sir William Evans was High Sheriff of County Kilkenny in 1686, and was attainted by the Patriot Parliament in 1689. His only son died young, and the title became extinct on his death in 1690.

== Evans baronets, of Kilcreene (1683) ==
- Sir William Evans, 1st Baronet (1662–1690)
