= Take back control =

British political slogan

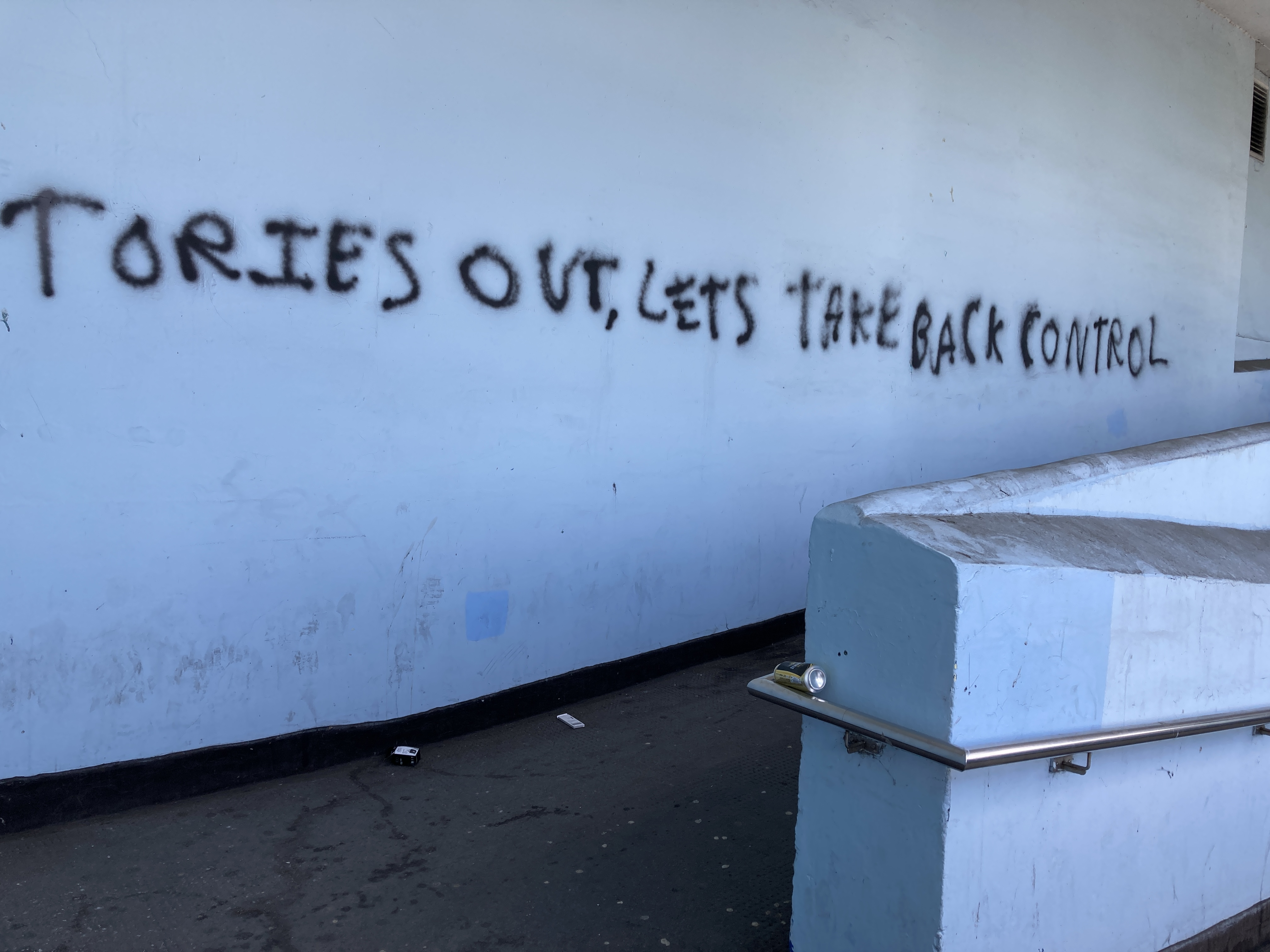
Graffiti in Uxbridge in 2022 reading "Tories out, let's take back control"

"Take back control", or sometimes "let's take back control", is a British political slogan. Originally associated with the 2016 Brexit referendum, it was coined by Dominic Cummings, the director of the Vote Leave campaign, which then popularised the slogan. The slogan was used by supporters of Brexit, Britain's withdrawal from the European Union, and implied that Britain's sovereignty, ability to make its own laws and ability to control its borders had been lost due to its membership of the EU and would return after withdrawal. It was also associated with anti-immigration sentiment.

In the years since the Brexit referendum, the slogan has been co-opted by other organisations and movements, such as the Labour Party under Prime Minister Keir Starmer, who has used the slogan to promote local devolution and stricter controls on immigration, and the Conservative Party of Canada under Pierre Poilievre who has used it to criticise the spending and immigration policies of the Liberal Party of Canada. It is cited as one of the "three word slogans" that have been used frequently in British politics.

== Use ==
The slogan was present from the launch of the Vote Leave campaign at its headquarters on 20 February 2016, at which John Whittingdale, Theresa Villiers, Michael Gove, Chris Grayling, Iain Duncan Smith and Priti Patel stood behind a banner reading "let's take back control".

In January 2023, Labour Party leader Keir Starmer used the term, stating that the slogan was "really powerful, it was like a Heineken phrase ... it got into people's heads" and that "the control people want is control over their lives and their communities". He put forward that Labour would "embrace the take back control message, but we'll turn it from a slogan into a solution". Following this, he made a promise of a "take back control bill" which he said would devolve more powers to local communities.

In May 2025, UK Prime Minister Keir Starmer commented that the strategy set out in his government's immigration White Paper would "finally take back control of our borders" and that the changes in immigration policy would "finally honour what 'take back control' meant".

== Meaning and effectiveness ==
A main message of the slogan was its support for the restoration of a lost British sovereignty that its supporters believed had been taken by the nation's membership of the European Union. Through the adoption of the "take back control" slogan, sovereignty became instrumental aspect of the Vote Leave campaign. According to Andrew Gamble, the slogan portrayed "a vision of Britain as once again an independent country in full control of its laws, its borders, and its money". Gamble has compared the term in this sense to the American slogan used by Donald Trump, "Make America Great Again".

Another main message interpreted within the slogan is the regaining of control of the borders of the United Kingdom.

More generally, the slogan symbolised a return to Britain's past. Some academics have argued that the slogan is linked to Britain's imperial past. Jeremy Fox for OpenDemocracy has argued that it "carried an emotional appeal to the English founded on their cultural heritage – just as a similar emotion surely appealed to those Scots who, in voting for independence from the UK in 2014, bore in their veins the widely-resented 1707 Act of Union with England." Jack Black has argued that the slogan "provided a prism through which UK-EU relations could be projected through English anxieties regarding its imperial decline."

== Criticism ==
The slogan received frequent criticism in terms of its central sovereignty argument. The director of think tank Chatham House wrote in June 2016 that it was "an empty slogan unless doing so improves prospects for British citizens. In an increasingly interdependent world, Britain will be better off pooling discrete areas of its sovereign power with 500 million fellow Europeans than leaving its population of 65 million beholden to the rules and whims of others." Jack Black argued in 2019 that "the 'take back control' slogan failed to elaborate on where such sovereignty would lie: with Westminster (the UK government) or with an independent English parliament?"

The slogan also received criticism on account of its political framing of border control and immigration. Katy Hayward put forward in 2020 that the slogan represented "not only the misunderstanding of the nature of territorial sovereignty in the contemporary world [...] but also a misrepresentation of the UK's borders themselves," as it assumed the UK was an "island nation" and "that border control means, simply, immigration control," despite its land connection to the EU through the Republic of Ireland–United Kingdom border. She argued that the border's "very existence disrupts the Brexitian conception of the British state."

Others have criticised the use of the term to symbolise a return to the past. John Agnew stated in 2019 that "Brexit has turned out to be so hard to accomplish because in its most publicly expressed aspiration, to take back control to ‘how things were’, it is impossible."

== Other uses ==
In response to the 2025 resignation of Canadian prime minister Justin Trudeau, the Conservative Party of Canada leader Pierre Poilievre stated that "Canadians can take back control of their lives and their country. Take back control of our border. Take back control of immigration. Take back control of spending, deficits and inflation."

In May 2025, Labour prime minister Keir Starmer used the phrase five times during his speech announcing new immigration plans.

== See also ==
- Brexit and the Irish border – Effect on Ireland's UK/EU border
  - Irish Sea border – Trade border between Northern Ireland and Great Britain
  - Northern Ireland protocol – Part of the Brexit withdrawal agreement
  - Windsor Framework – 2023 agreement between the EU and UK
- Glossary of Brexit terms
- Non-tariff barriers to trade – Other types of trade barriers
- Primacy of European Union law – Legal principle
- Project Fear – Term used in British politics
- Sovereigntism – Ideology supporting political independence of a nation or region
