= Downing Street Press Secretary =

Adviser to the prime minister of the UK

- Royal Arms as used by His Majesty's Government
- Incumbent; John Stevens since July 2026
- Prime Minister's Office
- Appointer: Prime Minister
- Formation: 1945; 81 years ago
- First holder: Frank Williams
- Website: 10 Downing Street

The Downing Street Press Secretary is an adviser to the prime minister of the United Kingdom on news media and how to manage the image of the British government to the press. The position is part of the Prime Minister's Office and involves using information on what is happening in the UK and around the world, to decide on how the Prime Minister should present his or her reaction to the media. The incumbent also advises on how to handle news stories and other information which could affect the current Prime Minister or the Ministry.

The current Press Secretary is Sophie Nazemi.

== Role ==
The Press Secretary will address the lobby correspondents at 10 Downing Street to give journalists information on events attended by the Prime Minister, as well as current affairs in Downing Street and in Parliament. The Press Secretary works within the Prime Minister's Office and the Downing Street Press Office.

== History ==
Various political advisers have in the past acted in a press secretary role. The first dedicated press officer, appointed in 1931 'to meet the need of a full-time public relations officer in the Prime Minister's Office', was George Steward, who remained in post until 1944. Francis Williams, a journalist who had served in the Ministry of Information during the Second World War, served under Clement Attlee, as 'Adviser on Public Relations'. Winston Churchill shunned the role, and did not appoint anyone to the role until several months into his premiership, when he hired Fife Clark. In 1997 Alastair Campbell was appointed by then-Prime Minister Tony Blair. When David Cameron was elected, Gabby Bertin who had previously served as the head of press for the Conservative Party became the Downing Street Press Secretary. She was later replaced by Susie Squire in 2012. In July 2016 when Theresa May became Prime Minister, Lizzie Loudon was appointed as her Press Secretary. Following the resignation of Loudon in April 2017, Paul Harrison took over the role after the general election on 8 June.

Rob Oxley was appointed Press Secretary immediately following Boris Johnson's appointment as Prime Minister on 24 July 2019; he served until March 2020, when he moved to perform a similar role at the Foreign, Commonwealth and Development Office. On 8 October 2020 it was announced that Allegra Stratton would take over from him in an expanded role to include fronting new daily televised press briefings. These were originally scheduled for launch in November 2020 but were repeatedly delayed before being scrapped on 20 April 2021, without any taking place.

Stratton was replaced by Rosie Bate-Williams, a former media special adviser in Downing Street, who in turn was replaced by Alex Wild as part of the Truss ministry in September 2022. On October 25, 2022, following the replacement of Liz Truss as Prime Minister and leader of the Conservative Party by Rishi Sunak, Nerissa Chesterfield was appointed by Sunak as the new Press Secretary.

== List of press secretaries ==
Press Secretary	Years	Prime Minister
Francis Williams	1945–1947	Clement Attlee
Philip Jordan	1947–1951	Clement Attlee
Reginald Bacon	1951	Clement Attlee
Fife Clark	1952–1955	Winston Churchill
William D. Clark	1955–1956	Anthony Eden
Alfred Richardson	1956–1957	Anthony Eden
Harold Evans	1957–1963	Harold Macmillan
John Groves	1963–1964	Alec Douglas-Home
Trevor Lloyd-Hughes	1964–1969	Harold Wilson
Joe Haines	1969–1970	Harold Wilson
Donald Maitland	1970–1973	Edward Heath
Robin Haydon	1973–1974	Edward Heath
Joe Haines	1974–1976	Harold Wilson
Tom McCaffrey	1976–1979	James Callaghan
Henry James	1979	Margaret Thatcher
Bernard Ingham	1979–1990	Margaret Thatcher
Gus O'Donnell	1990–1993	John Major
Christopher Meyer	1993–1996	John Major
Jonathan Haslam	1996–1997	John Major
Alastair Campbell	1997–2001	Tony Blair
Godric Smith	2001–2004	Tony Blair
Tom Kelly	2004–2007	Tony Blair
Damian McBride	2007–2009	Gordon Brown
Gabby Bertin	2010–2012	David Cameron
Susie Squire	2012–2013	David Cameron
Graeme Wilson	2013–2016	David Cameron
Lizzie Loudon	2016–2017	Theresa May
Paul Harrison	2017–2019	Theresa May
Rob Oxley	2019–2020	Boris Johnson
Allegra Stratton	2020–2021	Boris Johnson
Rosie Bate-Williams	2021–2022	Boris Johnson
Alex Wild (interim)	2022	Liz Truss
Nerissa Chesterfield	2022–2023	Rishi Sunak
Lucy Noakes	2023–2024	Rishi Sunak
Sophie Nazemi	2024–2026	Keir Starmer
John Stevens	2026–present	Andy Burnham

== See also ==
- Press Office (Royal Household)
- Downing Street Director of Communications
