= Sir Harold Evans, 1st Baronet =

British civil servant

Sir Harold Evans Bt CMG OBE
- Sir Harold Evans in 1964

Downing Street Press Secretary
- In office 1957–1963
- Prime Minister: Alec Douglas-Home
- Preceded by: Alfred Richardson
- Succeeded by: John Groves

Personal details
- Born: Sidney Harold Evans; 29 April 1911
- Died: 21 April 1983 (aged 71)

Sir Sidney Harold Evans, 1st Baronet, CMG, OBE (29 April 1911 – 21 April 1983) was a British journalist and civil servant who served as Downing Street Press Secretary to Prime Minister Harold Macmillan between 1957 and 1963.

== Career ==
Evans served as a senior civil servant (public relations) in the Colonial Office, 1942–57.

Evans was created a Baronet, of Rottingdean in the County of Sussex in 1963.

In 1981, Hodder & Stoughton published Evans' diary, Downing Street Diary: The Macmillan Years, 1957-1963.

Baronetage of the United Kingdom
| New creation | Baronet (of Rottingdean); 1963–1983 | Extinct |
Government offices
| Preceded by Alfred Richardson | Downing Street Press Secretary; 1957-1963 | Succeeded by John Groves |
