= Nazmi =

Nazmi (also transliterated as Nadhmi, Arabic: نظمي) is an Arabic male given name, the pronunciation of the Arabic letter Ẓāʾ is often closer to a strong "d" sound, therefore the name's pronunciation differs based on the spoken varieties of Arabic and consequently in its transcription.

== Given name ==
- Nadhmi Auchi, British Iraqi businessman
- Nazmi Avluca, Turkish sports wrestler
- Nazmi Bari (1929–2008), Turkish tennis player
- Nazmi Ziya Güran (1881–1937), Turkish impressionist painter
- Nazmi Mehmeti (1918–1995), Albanian anti-communist from Macedonia
- Nadhmi Al-Nasr, Saudi executive'

== Surname ==
- Ali Nazmi (1878–1946), Azerbaijani poet
