= Bernard Ingham =

British civil servant and writer (1932–2023)

Sir Bernard Ingham
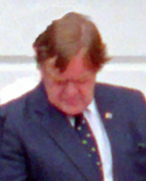
- Ingham in 1987

Downing Street Press Secretary
- In office 1979 – 28 November 1990
- Prime Minister: Margaret Thatcher
- Preceded by: Henry James
- Succeeded by: Gus O'Donnell

Personal details
- Born: 21 June 1932 Halifax, England
- Died: 24 February 2023 (aged 90) Caterham, England
- Spouse: Nancy Hoyle (m. 1956; died 2017)
- Children: 1
- Education: Hebden Bridge Grammar School; Bradford Technical College
- Occupation: Civil servant; journalist
- Awards: Knight Bachelor (1990)

Sir Bernard Ingham (21 June 1932 – 24 February 2023) was a British journalist and civil servant. He was Margaret Thatcher's chief press secretary throughout her time as Prime Minister of the United Kingdom from 1979 to 1990.

== Background ==
Ingham was born in Halifax and was raised in Hebden Bridge, in the West Riding of Yorkshire. He left school at the age of 16 to join the Hebden Bridge Times newspaper, for which he continued to write until 2013. He attended Bradford Technical College on day release as part of the studies required to qualify for the Certificate of Training for Junior Journalists, which he described as being "taken rather seriously in early post-war Britain".

Ingham worked for the Yorkshire Evening Post, the Yorkshire Post, latterly as Northern industrial correspondent (1952–1961), and The Guardian (1962–1967). While a reporter at the Yorkshire Post, Ingham was an active member of the National Union of Journalists and vice-chairman of its Leeds branch. He is also likely to have been the anonymous and aggressively anti-Conservative columnist "Albion" for the Leeds Weekly Citizen, a Labour Party publication, from 1964 to 1967.

In 1967, Ingham joined the Civil Service, working as a press and public relations officer and director of Information in various Government departments, including the National Board For Prices and Incomes (1967) and the Department of Energy, 1974–77, where he also served as Under-Secretary in the Energy Conservation Division, 1978–79.

Ingham's father was a Labour Party councillor for Hebden Royd Town Council, and he was himself a member of the Labour Party until he joined the Civil Service. Ingham contested the then safe Conservative Moortown ward of Leeds City Council in the 1965 council elections for the Labour Party, having been nominated by the Fabian Society.

== Press secretary to Margaret Thatcher ==
Ingham spent 11 years as Margaret Thatcher's chief press secretary in No. 10 Downing Street when she was Prime Minister. In 1979–90 he was also head of the Government Information Office. In the course of his civil service career, he was also press secretary to Barbara Castle, Robert Carr, Maurice Macmillan, Lord Carrington, Eric Varley and Tony Benn.

Although a career civil servant, Ingham gained a reputation for being a highly effective propagandist for the Thatcherite cause. The phrase spin doctor did not enter common parlance until after his retirement, but he was nevertheless considered a gifted exponent in what came to be known as the "black arts" of spin.

In those days, Downing Street briefings were "off the record", meaning that information given out by Ingham could be attributed only to "senior government sources". Occasionally he used this deniability to brief against the government's own ministers, such as when he described the leader of the House of Commons John Biffen as a "semi-detached" member of the government. Biffen was dropped at the next reshuffle. This blurring of the distinction between his nominally neutral role as a civil servant and a more partisan role as an apologist and promoter of Margaret Thatcher's policies led Christopher Hitchens to characterise Ingham as "a nugatory individual" and to criticise what he saw as the negative consequences of Ingham's time as Thatcher's press secretary: "During his time in office, Fleet Street took several steps towards an American system of Presidentially-managed coverage and sound-bite deference, without acquiring any of the American constitutional protection in return."

In 1987 Downing Street berated The Sun newspaper in a row over honours. Thatcher was said to be furious, and Ingham sent correspondence to The Sun asking it to explain why the honours list, given in confidence, had been published.

In 1989, three years after the Westland helicopter scandal led to the resignation of Defence Secretary Michael Heseltine, former cabinet minister Leon Brittan revealed in a Channel 4 programme that Ingham was one of two senior Downing Street officials who had approved the leaking of a crucial letter from the Solicitor General Patrick Mayhew, in which he questioned some of the statements that Heseltine had made about the takeover contest of the Westland helicopter company. Brittan's claim that Ingham and Charles Powell had approved the leak of the letter led to calls from some Labour MPs for there to be a new inquiry into the Westland affair.

Ingham was knighted on Thatcher's resignation – and retirement – in 1990. His successor as press secretary was Gus O'Donnell, who went on to become Cabinet secretary and head of the civil service in 2005.

Ingham's memoir Kill the Messenger, concerning his time as press secretary, was criticised by Paul Foot, a Marxist journalist, who commented that "... there is no information in this book. I picked it up eagerly, refusing to believe that someone so close to the top for so long could fail to reveal, even by mistake, a single interesting piece of information" and he was particularly scathing about Ingham's prose style, offering the following quotation from Kill the Messenger as representative of Ingham's use of English: "Like a mighty oak, it took more than one axe to bring Mrs Thatcher down. In November 1990 they were cutting into this solid timber from all angles. The frenzy was fearsome to behold. Heaven preserve us from political axe-men in a state of panic. They would cut off their grandmas in their prime if they thought it would serve their interests. And so they cut off a grandma in her international prime by the stocking tops, to borrow one of Denis's phrases, which Mrs Thatcher often used."

In a commentary in the Daily Express in April 2009, Ingham referred to Thatcher as "reckless" and a battler for Britain. He said her greatest quality was that she did not want to be loved, and she came to office without a Press Secretary and had "the enormous will" to overcome "defeatist inertia", such as: "Oh you can't do that Prime Minister, they won't allow it". He attended her funeral at St Paul's Cathedral in April 2013.

=== Television script ===
Ingham helped Thatcher in the writing of the Yes Minister sketch, which she performed in public with Paul Eddington and Nigel Hawthorne. In December 2001, Ingham said, on the death of Hawthorne, "Margaret Thatcher's fascination was with the games between the elected politician and the unelected official".

== After Thatcher ==
Ingham was vice-president of Country Guardian, an anti-wind energy campaign group. Ingham was also a regular panellist on BBC current affairs programme Dateline London. He had also been secretary to Supporters of Nuclear Energy (SONE, 1998–2007), a group of individuals who seek to promote nuclear power in the United Kingdom. Despite never having attended university himself, Ingham lectured in public relations at Middlesex University. He returned to the Yorkshire Post as a columnist, writing until January 2023.

=== Brass Eye ===
Ingham appeared on the satirical television programme, Brass Eye. He was persuaded to appear in a short sequence, in which he issued a stern warning to young people about the dangers of a purported new drug, "cake", one of several celebrities who appeared not to recognise the satirical nature of the programme. Ingham said that "several people have actually been brained by saucepans used to make this kind of Cake", before asking viewers to "use their cheese-box" and "say no, never".

=== Court case ===
On 8 March 1999, Ingham was bound over to keep the peace at Croydon Magistrates' Court after he was accused of causing criminal damage to a Mercedes car owned by Linda Cripps, a neighbour, in Purley, south London. The charges were dropped when Ingham agreed to accept being bound over for 12 months in the sum of £1,000 to keep the peace and be of good behaviour. Ingham denied that he had caused any damage to the vehicle.

The court was told that Cripps told Ingham: "You have damaged my car", to which he replied, "Good, I'm glad". Ingham said, "I did not cause the damage complained of and to resolve the issue I accepted advice that I should agree to be bound over. I have paid £792 to cover the cost of the alleged damage to the car." Cripps's husband said after the case "We are weary of the constant bombardment that we have suffered. We are no match for Sir Bernard Ingham. Let's hope that he will now allow us to get on with our lives peacefully".

=== Hillsborough ===
In a letter addressed to a parent of a victim of the 1989 Hillsborough disaster, Ingham reiterated his belief that the disaster was caused by "tanked up yobs", a view later entirely refuted by the Hillsborough inquest. In a 1996 letter written to a Liverpool FC supporter, Ingham remarked that people should "shut up about Hillsborough".

In June 1996, on Question Time, Ingham spoke in favour of compensating the police present at the time of the disaster, saying: "If thousands of ticketless fans had not turned up and pushed their way into the ground then the whole scenario would not have occurred." "You can't get away from what you were told," Ingham said. "We talked to a lot of people; I am not sure if it was the chief constable. That was the impression I gathered: there were a lot of tanked-up people outside." Speaking to The Guardian, he confirmed that this was what he was told when he and Margaret Thatcher were shown around, although he could not recall if South Yorkshire police's chief constable, Peter Wright, had said it personally.

Hebden Bridge residents launched a campaign against Ingham to remove him as a local newspaper columnist over his continued refusal to apologise for his words in the aftermath of the Hillsborough disaster. He continued to write articles until February 2013. On 26 April 2016, a jury gave the verdict that the 96 killed at Hillsborough were unlawfully killed and that the Liverpool fans' behaviour did not contribute to the dangerous situation at the turnstiles. Ingham declined to apologise or respond to the previous comments he made, which led to petitions being created on change.org and petitions.parliament.uk, the official website for government petitions.

=== Comments on Scottish nationalists ===
Ingham suggested Scottish nationalists were being "as greedy as sin", stating that "the only thing that fuelled nationalism was the smell of oil and money in oil", suggesting that any nationalist sentiments were merely a disguised form of greed.

== Thatcher's papers ==
In March 2011, it was reported by The Independent that Policy chief Sir Keith Joseph stated in public the view that Margaret Thatcher's first year in Downing Street had been "wasted". Joseph's press secretary reported this to Ingham. In his reply, contained in a letter dated 1 December 1980, he said Thatcher was "quite relaxed about it", adding: "I believe she agrees with Sir Keith but for the sake of the government and confidence in it does not say so."

== Personal life ==
Ingham was knighted in Thatcher's 1990 resignation honours list.

Ingham was married to Nancy (née Hoyle) for 60 years until she died in 2017. They had a son.

After living in Purley, London, Ingham lived in a care home in Caterham, Surrey, in his last years. He died on 24 February 2023, at the age of 90.

== Cultural depictions ==
Ingham has been depicted multiple times in film and television, including being portrayed by Glyn Houston in Thatcher: The Final Days (1991), Philip Jackson in Margaret (2009), Kevin McNally in season four of The Crown (2020), and Paul Clayton in both The Queen (2009) and Brian and Maggie (2025).

== Selected works ==
- Yorkshire Greats: The County's Fifty Finest (Dalesman, 2005) ISBN 1-85568-220-6
- Bernard Ingham's Yorkshire Villages (Dalesman, 2005) ISBN 1-85568-215-X
- The Wages of Spin (John Murray, 2003) ISBN 0-7195-6481-6
- Kill the Messenger ... Again (Politico's Publishing Ltd, 2003) ISBN 1-84275-048-8
- Bernard Ingham's Yorkshire Castles (Dalesman, 2001) ISBN 1-85568-193-5
- Kill the Messenger (Fontana, 1991) ISBN 0-00-637767-X
- The Slow Downfall of Margaret Thatcher: The Diaries of Bernard Ingham (Biteback, 2019) ISBN 978-1-78590-478-3

Government offices
Preceded by Henry James	Downing Street Press Secretary; 1979–1990	Succeeded by Gus O'Donnell
