= Trevor Lloyd-Hughes =

British civil servant

Sir Trevor Lloyd-Hughes

Downing Street Press Secretary
- In office 1964–1969
- Prime Minister: Harold Wilson
- Preceded by: John Groves
- Succeeded by: Joe Haines

Personal details
- Born: Trevor Denby Lloyd-Hughes; 31 March 1922
- Died: 15 February 2010 (aged 87)
- Education: Woodhouse Grove School, Jesus College, Oxford

Sir Trevor Denby Lloyd-Hughes (31 March 1922 – 15 February 2010) was a British civil servant who served as Downing Street Press Secretary to Prime Minister Harold Wilson between 1964 and 1969.

== Career ==
Lloyd-Hughes was educated at Woodhouse Grove School and Jesus College, Oxford. He saw active service with the 75th (Shropshire Yeomanry) Medium Regiment, Royal Artillery in Italy during the Second World War.

He spent 14 years as a journalist with the Liverpool Daily Post and, in that role, got to know Harold Wilson who was then the member of parliament for Huyton in Lancashire. Lloyd-Hughes was then recruited by Wilson and served as Downing Street Press Secretary to the Prime Minister between 1964 and 1969.

Lloyd-Hughes was knighted in the 1970 Prime Minister's Resignation Honours.

Government offices
Preceded by John Groves	Downing Street Press Secretary; 1964-1969	Succeeded by Joe Haines
