= Harry James (American football) =

American football player and manufacturer (1881–1947)

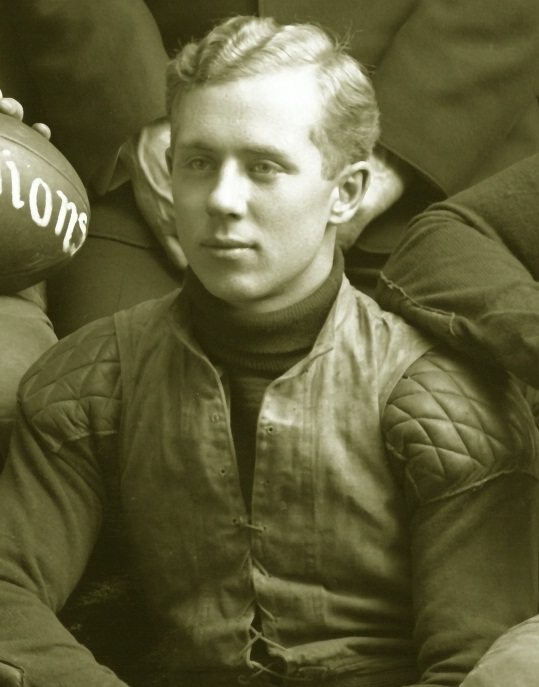
- Harry James cropped from 1903 Michigan football team photograph

Profile
- Position: Quarterback

Personal information
- Born: June 20, 1881; Ohio, U.S.
- Died: October 16, 1947 (aged 66); St. Clair, Michigan, U.S.

Career information
- High school: Detroit University School
- College: Michigan

Career history
- 1903: Michigan

Awards and highlights
- National champion (1903)

John Henry James (June 20, 1881 - October 16, 1947) was an American football quarterback and manufacturer. He was the starting quarterback for Michigan's undefeated, national championship 1903 "Point-a-Minute" football team that outscored opponents 565 to 6. James later went into the manufacturing business. He was the founder of The Motor Foundry Co., a manufacturer of automobile parts in Detroit, and the James Motor Valve Company, which developed the innovative "James Valve" in the mid-1920s. He also served as the general manager of the Monarch Steel Castings Co., an innovator in the Solvay process.

== Early life ==
James was born in Ohio in 1881. He was raised in Detroit and attended the Detroit University School. He was the captain of the school's football team during the 1900–1901 academic year. He was also captain of the track team during the 1899-1900 and 1900–1901 academic years.

== University of Michigan ==
He enrolled at the University of Michigan in the fall of 1901. He was captain of the All-Freshman football team in 1901 and of the reserve football team in 1902.

In 1903, and despite weighing only 142 pounds, James took over as the Wolverines' starting quarterback. At the start of the 1903 season, expectations were low, as the team had lost most of its starters, including the two leading scorers and starting quarterback Boss Weeks. With only eight veterans returning, team captain Curtis Redden wrote that "[n]o season in the history of Michigan football has opened with a gloomier outlook" than that of 1903.

Despite the low expectations, James led the 1903 team to an 11-0-1 record while outscoring opponents 565 to 6. The 1903 team was the third of Fielding H. Yost's legendary "Point-a-Minute" teams and has been recognized retrospectively as a national championship team for 1903 by the National Championship Foundation.

The season was not without its challenges for James. Before a key game against Wisconsin, rumors spread that Yost was considering replacing James with Fred Norcross. At a rally the night before the Wisconsin game, Yost was asked directly whether he would keep James, whose wrist was bound in a splint, at quarterback. Yost replied succinctly, "Yes. He is the better player." Michigan defeated Wisconsin 16–0, but the team had difficulty reaching Wisconsin's goal and relied on Tom Hammond to kick two field goals. On Hammond's first kick, the snap to James was high, but he was credited with pulling it in and placing it accurately to allow Hammond to convert the kick for a 5–0 lead.

Before the final game of the season, the Thanksgiving Day rivalry game with Amos Alonzo Stagg's Chicago Maroons, rumors returned that Yost might replace James with Norcross. The night before the game, Yost revealed that James had won the quarterback job over Norcross. James started and played the entire Chicago game, leading the team to a 28–0 victory. After the game, Yost said the team's play against Chicago was "the best he had ever seen by a Michigan team during his three years here." The Detroit Free Press called it "the most severe drubbing ever administered to the Maroons in the history of football of that institution."

The Wolverines compiled a perfect record with James at quarterback. The team's sole setback during the 1903 season was a 6–6 tie on the road against Minnesota. James did not appear in the Minnesota game, as Yost played Norcross at quarterback for the entire game. In its overview of the 1903 season, The Michigan Alumnus praised James:

James's work at quarter merits praise. It was a difficult task to set any man -- that of filling the key position in the team acceptable to those who were demanding another Weeks. James kept pluckily at his work, unmindful of adverse criticism, and in the culmination of the season, his generalship and backfield tackling were first-rate.

James graduated from Michigan in 1905 with an engineering degree. While attending the university, he was a member of the Vulcans, the Friars, Zeta Psi fraternity, and the Wrinkle Board and a member of the Executive Committee of the Michigan Union.

== Family and later years ==
James married Mary Jane Brown on November 20, 1907, in Detroit. His father-in-law, Robert H. Brown, was one of the principals of Brown Brothers Tobacco Company. In 1910, James and his wife had a daughter, Jane Elizabeth. At time of the 1910 Census, he was living with his wife Mary, his mother-in-law, infant daughter Jane E. (5 months), and a servant at the Brown house at 709 Cass Avenue in Detroit. James was employed in 1910 as the manager at a foundry.

In 1911, James founded The Motor Foundry Co. in Detroit to manufacture iron and steel castings. He incorporated with two partners and capital of $35,000. The company built a large foundry in Detroit at a cost of $18,000. The company specialized in manufacturing gray iron automobile parts. By April 1913, the company increased its capital to $100,000 and announced plans to expand its plant and erect additional buildings. The company employed 265 men and did casting business of 40-50 tons a day. With the expansion, capacity was to be raised to 80 tons a day.

In a draft registration card completed in September 1918, James indicated that he was living with his wife, Mary Brown James, at 69 Taylor Street in Detroit. He was employed at the time as the general manager of the Monarch Steel Castings Co. at 316 Solvay in Detroit. At the time of the 1920 Census was still living at 69 Taylor Street in Detroit with his wife, Mary, daughter Betty (age 9), son Dick (age 5), his mother-in-law and a servant. He was then employed as a foundry manager.

In the early 1920s, James founded the James Motor Valve Company in Detroit. In 1926, his company gained notoriety for its development of an innovative valve, known as the James Valve, that was immune to heat, warping, burning or pitting as a result of its hollow-head construction. The valve was first tested in 1923. James later moved his company to Marine City, Michigan, and established his residence at St. Clair, Michigan. He remained the president of the James Motor Valve Company until his death. In October 1947, James died at his home in St. Clair at age 66. He was survived by his wife, a son, and a daughter.
