= Harry James (Australian footballer) =

Australian rules footballer

Personal information
- Full name: Henry George James
- Born: 18 June 1877; Kensington, Victoria
- Died: 13 October 1940 (aged 63); Fitzroy North, Victoria

Playing career^{1}
Years	Club	Games (Goals)
1897	Fitzroy	1 (0)
- ^{1} Playing statistics correct to the end of 1897.

Henry George James (18 June 1877 – 13 October 1940) was an Australian rules footballer who played with Fitzroy in the Victorian Football League (VFL).
