= Rob Oxley =

British public relations officer

Rob Oxley OBE

Downing Street Press Secretary
- In office 24 July 2019 – March 2020
- Prime Minister: Boris Johnson
- Preceded by: Paul Harrison
- Succeeded by: Allegra Stratton

Robert Mark Raymond Oxley OBE is a British public relations officer and government appointee who was selected by Boris Johnson to serve as Downing Street Press Secretary from 24 July 2019.

== Career ==
Oxley worked at the online food delivery company Deliveroo. Oxley appeared as an advocate of the bedroom tax in a debate with journalist and Labour Party activist Owen Jones on behalf of the TaxPayers' Alliance in 2013.

Oxley formerly served as an advisor to Priti Patel and Michael Fallon. Along with former-Director of Communications Lee Cain, Oxley worked as Head of Media for the Vote Leave campaign.

Oxley was appointed Downing Street Press Secretary by Boris Johnson upon the start of his premiership on 24 July 2019.

On 11 December 2019, a day before the general election, Oxley was filmed blocking a reporter from Good Morning Britain and swearing at him. The reporter was attempting to interview Prime Minister Boris Johnson.

Oxley served as a special adviser at the Foreign, Commonwealth and Development Office beginning in March 2020. In September 2021, he moved to work for Culture Secretary Nadine Dorries.

Oxley was appointed an officer of the Order of the British Empire in the 2022 Prime Minister's Resignation Honours for political and public service.

Government offices
Preceded by Paul Harrison	Downing Street Press Secretary; 2019-2020	Succeeded by Allegra Stratton
