= Tom McCaffrey (political adviser) =

British civil servant (1922–2016)

Sir Tom McCaffrey

Downing Street Press Secretary
- In office 1976–1979
- Prime Minister: James Callaghan
- Preceded by: Joe Haines
- Succeeded by: Henry James

Chief of Staff to the Leader of the Opposition
- In office 1979–1983
- Leader: James Callaghan; Michael Foot
- Succeeded by: Charles Clarke

Chief Assistant to the Leader of the Opposition
- In office 1980–1983
- Leader: Michael Foot

Personal details
- Born: Thomas Daniel McCaffrey; 20 February 1922 Glasgow, Scotland
- Died: 8 July 2016 (aged 94)
- Spouse: Agnes (Nancy) Douglas (m. 1949)
- Children: 6
- Education: Hyndland Secondary School; St Aloysius college, Glasgow
- Occupation: Civil servant

Military service
- Allegiance: United Kingdom
- Branch/service: Royal Air Force
- Years of service: 1940–1945
- Battles/wars: World War II

Sir Thomas Daniel McCaffrey (20 February 1922 – 8 July 2016) was a British civil servant who served as Downing Street Press Secretary under James Callaghan from 1976 to 1979.

== Early life ==
Tom McCaffrey was born in Glasgow and educated at the local Hyndland Secondary School. Later he would attend the Jesuit St Aloysius college. He was the son of a travelling salesman, William McCaffrey and his wife Bridget (nee McCafferty). During World War II he joined the Royal Air Force and served as a wireless radio operator.

== Career ==
After demobilisation in 1945 he commenced his career with the civil service, eventually going on to serve as Downing Street Press Secretary for Labour prime minister James Callaghan. After the defeat of Callaghan in the 1979 general election, he went to work for the new Labour party leader, Michael Foot.

Tom McCaffrey was knighted in the 1979 dissolution honours list.

== Personal life ==
In 1949, he married Agnes Douglas, known as Nancy. The union bore four daughters and two sons.

Government offices
| Preceded by Joe Haines | Downing Street Press Secretary; 1976–1979 | Succeeded by Henry James |
