= Borders of the United Kingdom =

Political boundaries between the United Kingdom and neighboring territories

The following is a list of maritime and land borders of the UK and its overseas territories:

| Country or territory (Territories without full sovereignty in italics) | No. of land border neighbours | No. of maritime boundary neighbours | Total no. of unique neighbours | Neighbouring countries and territories (Territories without full sovereignty in italics) (L) = share only land borders (M) = share only maritime boundaries blank = share land borders and maritime boundaries |
|---|---|---|---|---|
| United Kingdom | 1 | 8 | 8 | Belgium (M); Denmark (M); France France–UK border (M); Germany (M); Ireland (L); Netherlands (M); Norway (M); Faroe Islands(Denmark) (M) |
| United Kingdom (plus British Overseas Territories and Crown Dependencies) →including: → Akrotiri and Dhekelia →Anguilla →Bermuda →British Indian Ocean Territory →British Virgin Islands →Cayman Islands →Falkland Islands →Gibraltar →Guernsey →Isle of Man →Jersey →Montserrat →Pitcairn Islands →Saint Helena, Ascension and Tristan da Cunha →South Georgia and the South Sandwich Islands →Turks and Caicos Islands | 4 | 29 | 30 | Antigua and Barbuda (M); Argentina (M); Bahamas (M); Belgium (M); Colombia (M); Cuba (M); Cyprus; Denmark (M); Dominican Republic (M); Egypt (M); France (M); Germany (M); Haiti (M); Honduras (M); Ireland; Jamaica (M); Lebanon (M); Maldives (M); Morocco (M); Netherlands (M); Norway (M); Saint Kitts and Nevis (M); Spain; Venezuela (M); Faroe Islands(Denmark) (M); French Polynesia(France) (M); Puerto Rico(United States) (M) (France) Saint Martin(France) (M); Northern Cyprus (L) > (M) and United Nations Buffer Zone in Cyprus |
| British Antarctic Territory | 7 | | 7 | Ross Dependency (L); Adélie Land (L); Australian Antarctic Territory (L); Queen Maud Land; Marie Byrd Land (Terra nullius) (L); Territorial claims not recognised by the UK: Chilean Antarctic Territory; Argentine Antarctica |

== See also ==
- Republic of Ireland–United Kingdom border
- Gibraltar–Spain border
- Borders of Akrotiri and Dhekelia
