= Monese =

British financial services company

Monese Ltd
- Type: Private
- Industry: Financial technology, financial services
- Founded: 2015; 11 years ago
- Headquarters: London, United Kingdom
- Area served: European Economic Area
- Key people: Norris Koppel, founder & CEO
- Products: Current accounts, remittance, debit cards
- Revenue: £27.7 million (2022)
- Number of employees: 370 (2019)
- Website: www.monese.com

Monese is a British company that offers current accounts and money transfer services as an alternative to traditional banks. The mobile-only service provides accounts in Pounds sterling, euros and Romanian leu, and is available in 31 countries across the European Economic Area. As of January 2020, it has over 2 million customers.

== History ==
Monese was founded by Norris Koppel, an entrepreneur from Estonia. Koppel moved to the United Kingdom and had his application for a current account at a major high-street bank declined because he could not provide local proof of address and did not yet have credit history in the UK. This experience led Koppel to vow that one day he would launch a banking service that did not exclude customers based on their residency or lack of credit history.

The company completed its seed round in May 2015, raising $1.8 million from Seedcamp, early Spotify investor Shakil Khan and several other angel investors.

Monese launched its first product, an instant-to-open mobile current account in the UK, on 21 September 2015.

Prior to the launch of its current account, it was reported that over 56,000 customers pre-registered for service and joined a waiting list to be granted access. Monese is able to provide banking services to resident and non-resident customers, and has an account opening process that can be completed on a customer's smartphone in under three minutes.

Monese closed its Series A round in January 2017, announcing a $10 million raise from Outward VC, Anthemis Exponential Ventures, STE capital, and Korea Investment Partners, Smartcap and Seedcamp. Later that year it launched European accounts.

Its next funding round, $60 million as part of Series B, was announced on 6 September 2018, and was led by Swedish investment company Kinnevik AB, with participation from PayPal, Augmentum Fintech, British Airways owner International Airlines Group and Investec backed Outward VC.

Monese initially provided all of its services free of charge, except international money transfer – but in 2016 it began charging a fixed fee of £4.95 per month for its current account product. It subsequently launched other plans and, as of November 2019, offers three different pricing plans: "Simple" with limited benefits but no fixed monthly fee, "Classic" for £4.95 per month, and "Premium" with no transaction charges for £14.95 per month.

Towards the end of 2023 Monese began to charge UK customers £0.30 for virtual debit cards and £1 for domestic outgoing bank transfers. Transfers between Monese bank accounts remained unaffected.

They aims to secure additional funding in 2024

== Mobile apps ==
To open and manage a Monese current account, customers must install the company's mobile app on their Android or iOS smartphone. The Android app has been available since Monese's public launch on 21 September 2015, and the iOS app launched on 28 July 2016.

== See also ==
- Neobanks in Europe
