= Commons Privileges Committee investigation into Boris Johnson =

2023 parliamentary inquiry on the conduct of Boris Johnson MP

The UK House of Commons Committee of Privileges inquiry into the matter referred on 21 April 2022 on the conduct of Boris Johnson concerned four specific assertions made by the then Prime Minister at Prime Minister's Questions about "the legality of activities in 10 Downing Street and the Cabinet Office under Covid regulations", events commonly referred to as Partygate. The investigation was concerned with whether Johnson misled the Commons when he made these statements. Johnson resigned over the investigation after having been sent a draft copy of the committee's report.

The Committee voted on the final report text and unanimously supported it. They concluded that Johnson had deliberately misled the House, a contempt of Parliament. They said that, had he still been an MP, they would have recommended a 90-day suspension. The report stated that Johnson tried to "rewrite the meaning" of COVID rules "to fit his own evidence" for example that "a leaving gathering or a gathering to boost morale was a lawful reason to hold a gathering." They concluded he was guilty of further contempts of Parliament and that he breached confidentiality requirements by criticising the Committee's provisional findings when he resigned.

The Commons debated the report on 19 June 2023. Labour forced a vote and the Commons voted 354 to 7 in support, with a large number of abstentions. This was an absolute majority of the Commons. 118 Conservative MPs, including 15 ministers, voted for the report and 225 abstained. Prime Minister Rishi Sunak had earlier said he had other commitments, and did not attend the debate and refused to say how he would have voted.

== Background ==
Partygate was the political scandal concerning staff gatherings, mainly in 10 Downing Street, during the COVID-19 pandemic in 2020 and 2021, that contravened public health restrictions, which only allowed certain gatherings to take place at the time, and which contributed to Boris Johnson's downfall as Prime Minister. The first reporting relating to these events was on 30 November 2021 of 10 Downing Street staff gatherings during the 2020 Christmas season. Johnson said rules had been followed, and Downing Street denied that a party took place. Reports of further events emerged. In January 2022, the Metropolitan Police opened an investigation into potential breaches of COVID-19 regulations, which led to fixed penalty notices being issued. Johnson made several statements to the Commons about the matter.

On 19 April 2022, Speaker of the Commons Lindsay Hoyle approved an application, from the leader of the Labour Party and other leading opposition MPs, (Note: The motion was in the name of the following MPs: Keir Starmer, leader of the Labour Party; Ian Blackford, Commons leader of the SNP; Ed Davey, leader of the Liberal Democrats; Liz Saville Roberts, Commons leader of Plaid Cymru; Colum Eastwood, leader of the SDLP; Caroline Lucas, Green Party; Stephen Farry, deputy leader of the Alliance Party) to table a motion for debate followed by a vote on 21 April, on whether Johnson should be referred to the Parliamentary Privileges Committee to investigate whether he knowingly misled Parliament in his comments.

On 19 April 2022, the i news website said that a vote would reveal the loyalties of the so-far silent Tory MPs; this could then be used by opposition MPs to influence voters in the unrelated May local elections, even if, as expected by i, they lost the vote. On 20 April, the Conservative leadership initially sought to have their MPs vote the motion down, but faced a potential rebellion among their backbench MPs. They instead tabled an amendment to delay the decision about referring Johnson to the Privileges Committee until after the investigative report into Partygate by Sue Gray was published. However, by the morning of 21 April, further Conservative MPs were threatening to rebel. The Government's position shifted further and they dropped the three-line whip for their amendment.

The chair of the committee, Labour MP Chris Bryant, recused himself on the grounds of comments he had made about the matter previously. The motion was tabled on 21 April 2022, with Tory MPs told not to oppose it. Thus, the Commons approved the motion without a vote. The motion called for the Privileges Committee to launch an inquiry, once the police had finished their own investigation into the gatherings.

The committee began its considerations on 29 June 2022 and appointed the Sir Ernest Ryder, former President of Tribunals for the United Kingdom and former Lord Justice of Appeal, as their legal adviser.

The committee could recommend a range of possible sanctions, including a suspension from the Commons, and resignation for knowingly misleading Parliament. The full Commons would have to approve any sanctions in a vote. It was initially unclear if the Recall of MPs Act 2015 would apply to any suspension, but the Commons Speaker subsequently ruled that it would.

Johnson announced his resignation as Prime Minister on 7 July 2022, with Liz Truss being appointed the new Prime Minister on 6 September 2022. Truss was replaced by Rishi Sunak on 25 October 2022.

The Government hired Lord Pannick to advise Johnson, who released an opinion critical of the committee's functioning. The Privileges Committee responded, saying, "The Committee accepts the view of its impartial legal advisers and the Clerks that Lord Pannick's opinion is founded on a systemic misunderstanding of the parliamentary process and misplaced analogies with the criminal law."

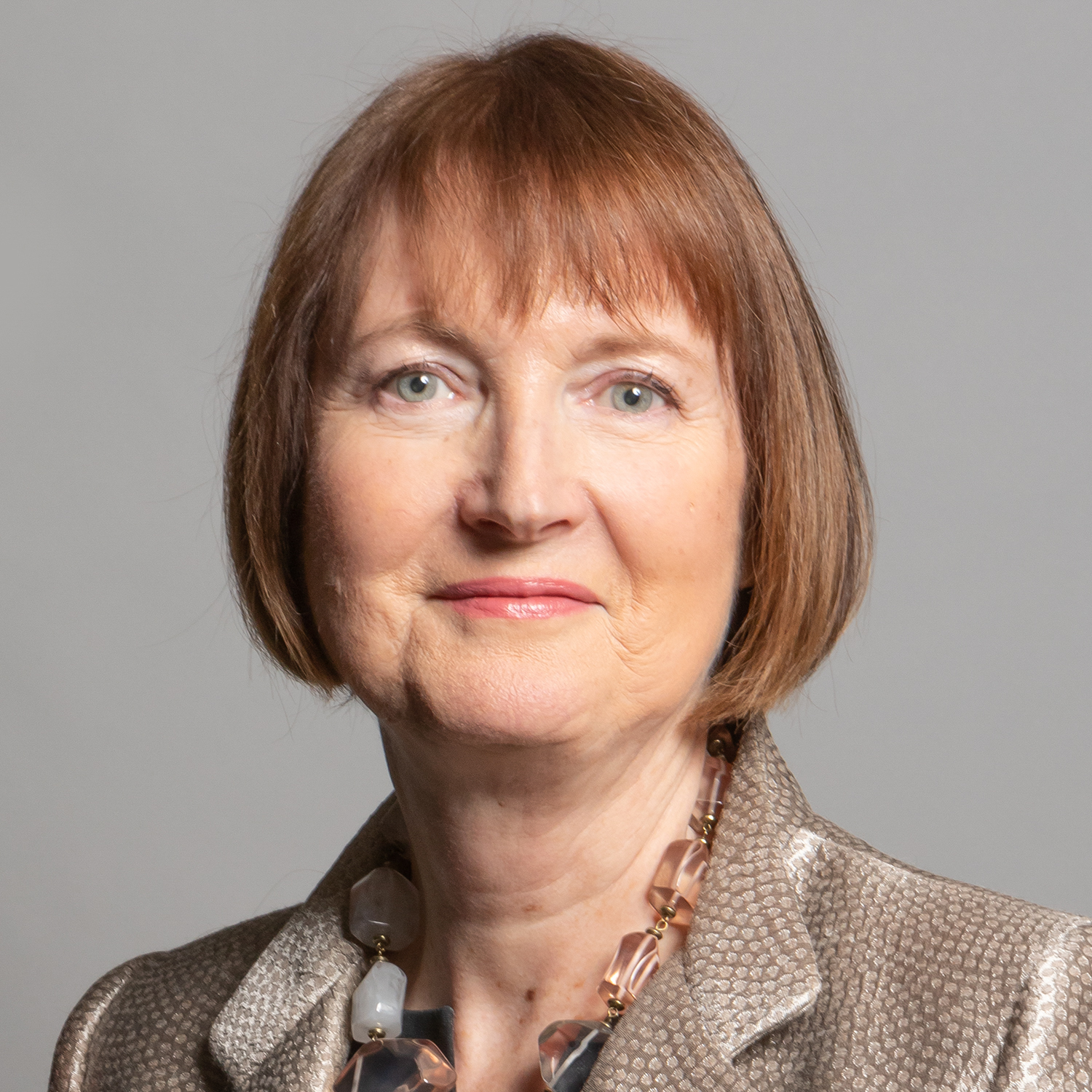
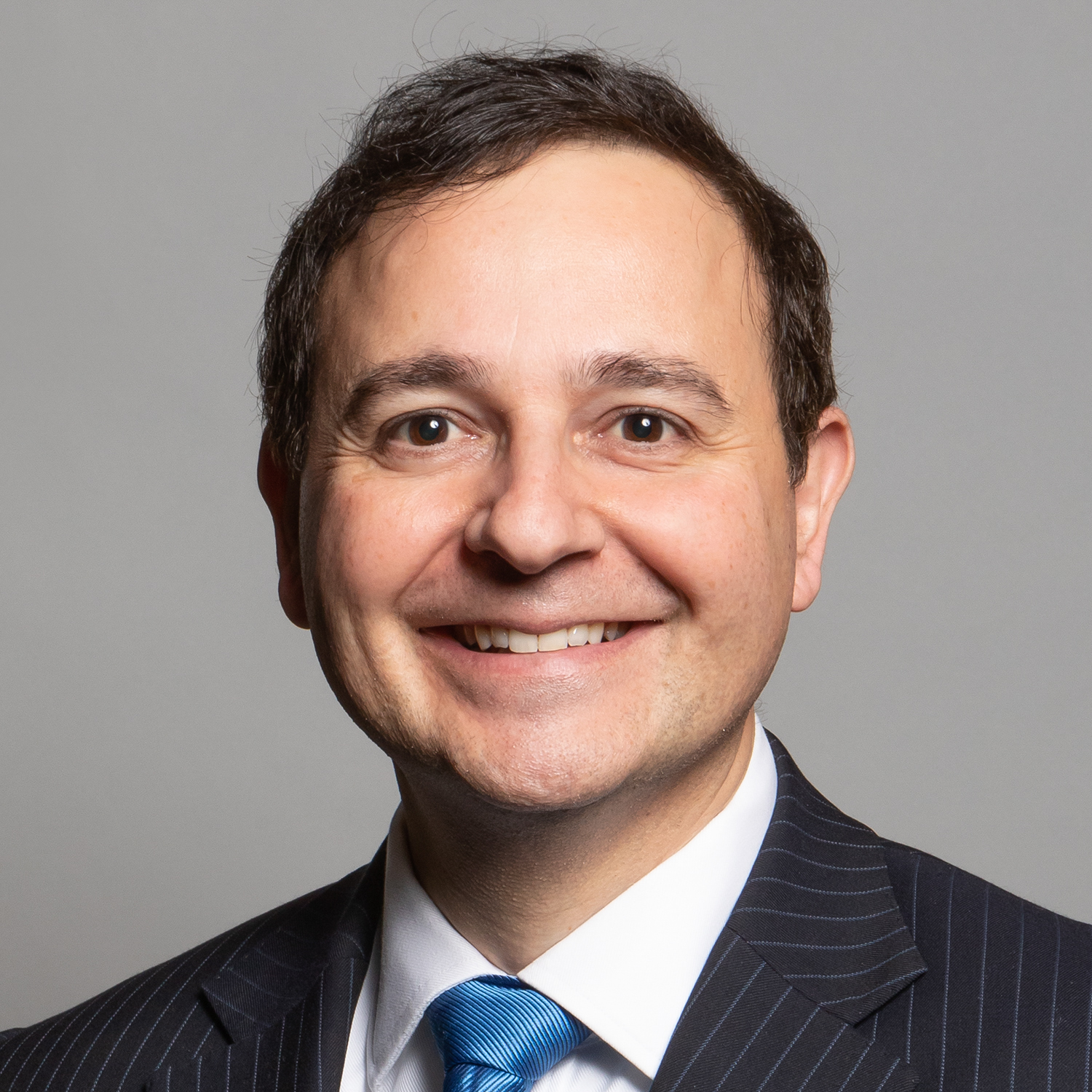
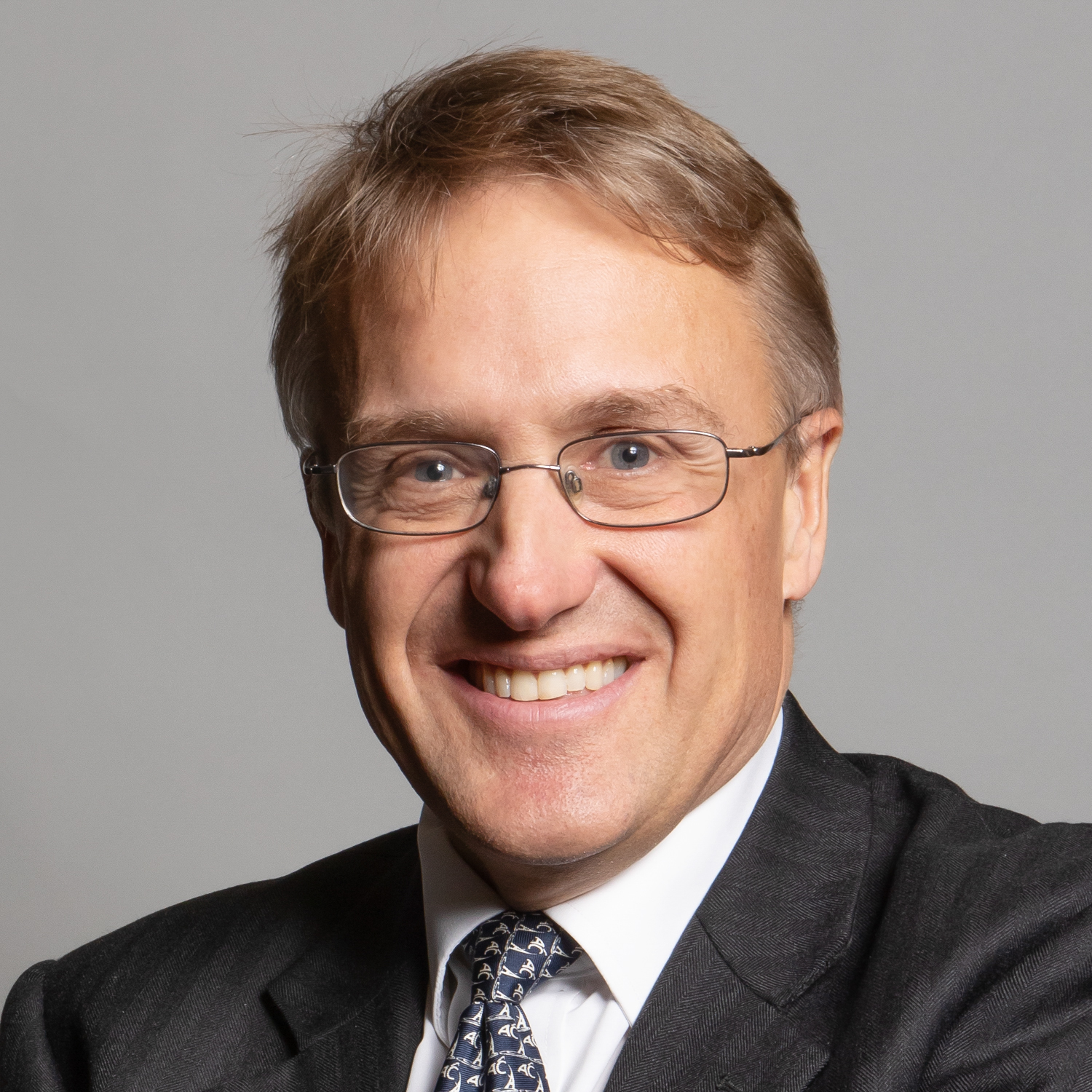
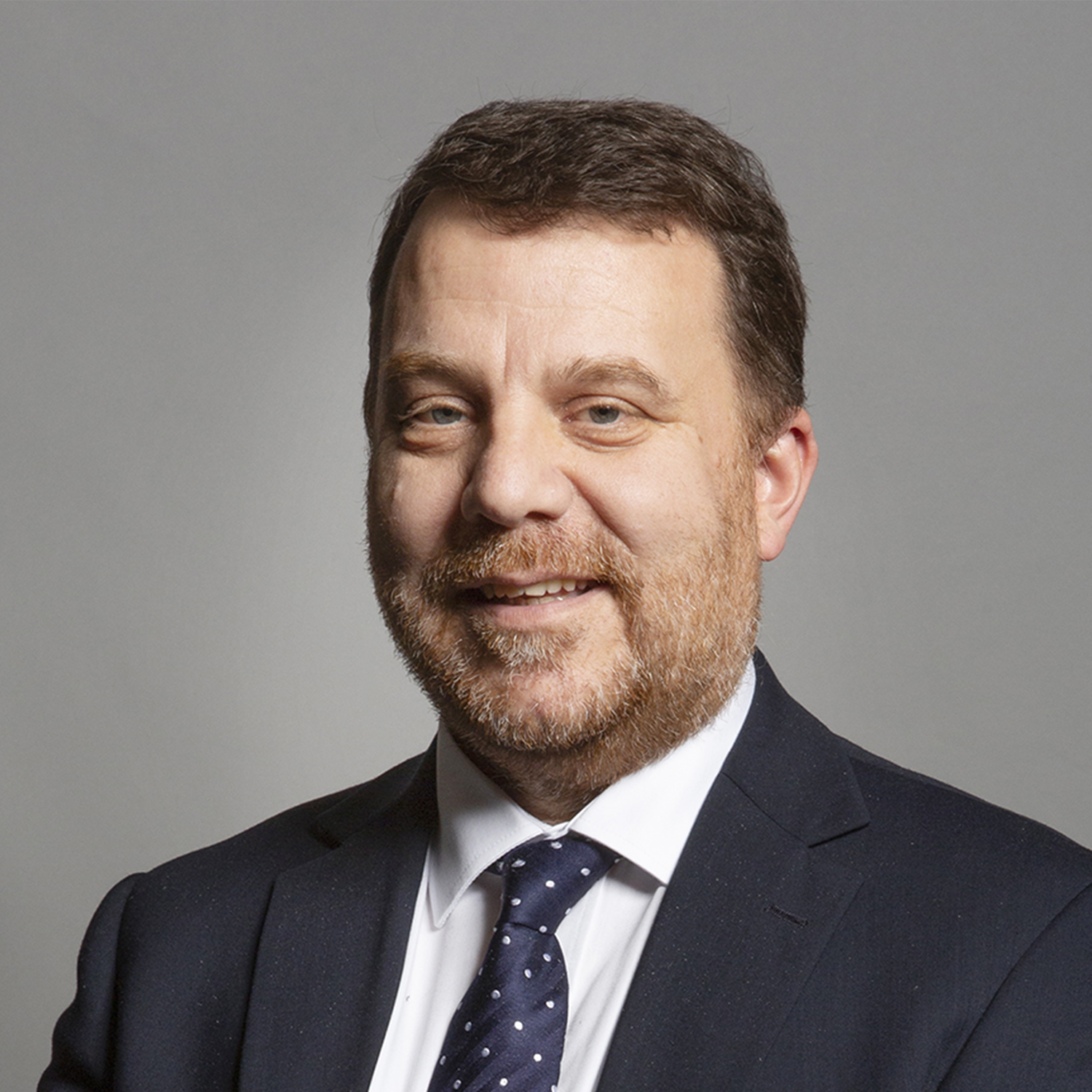
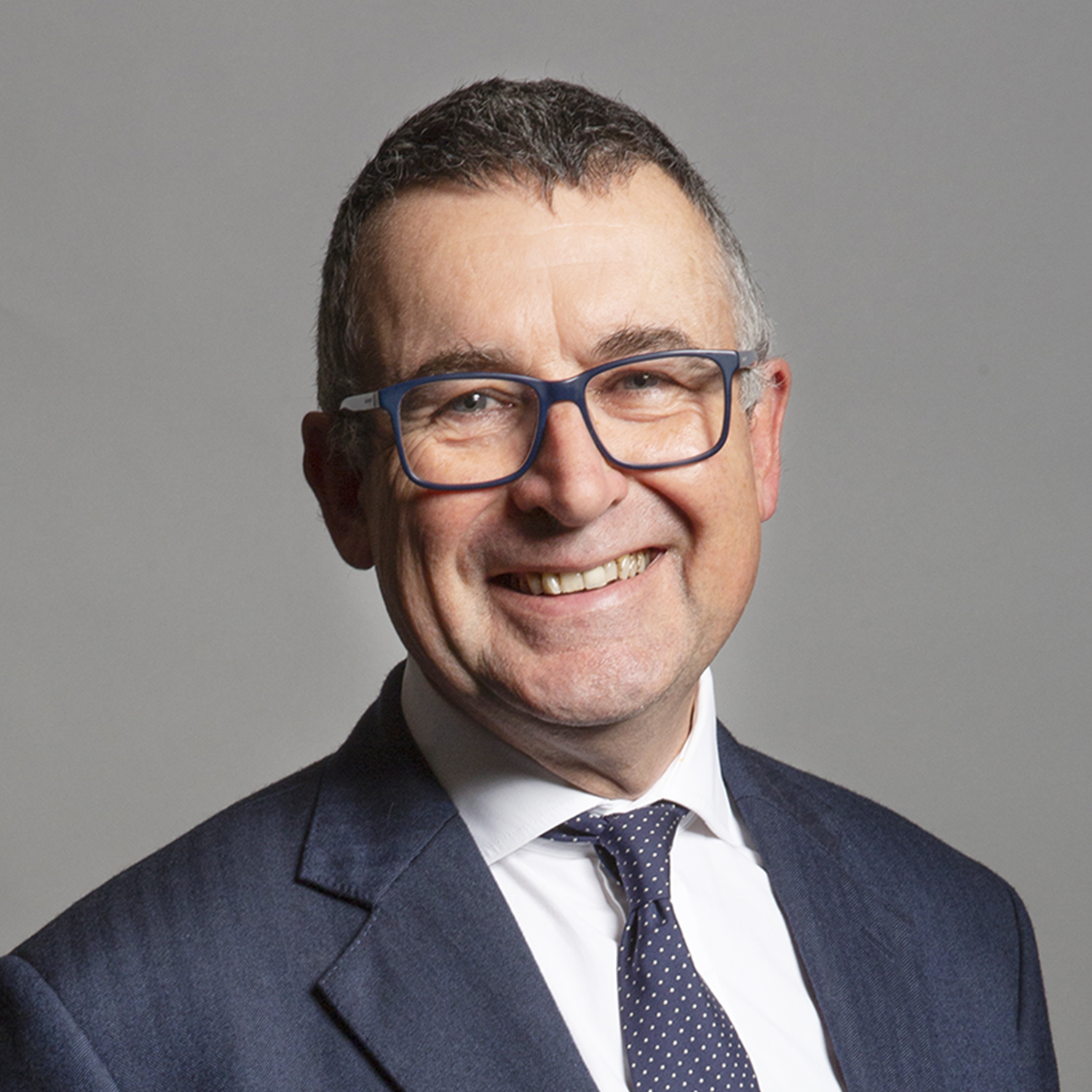
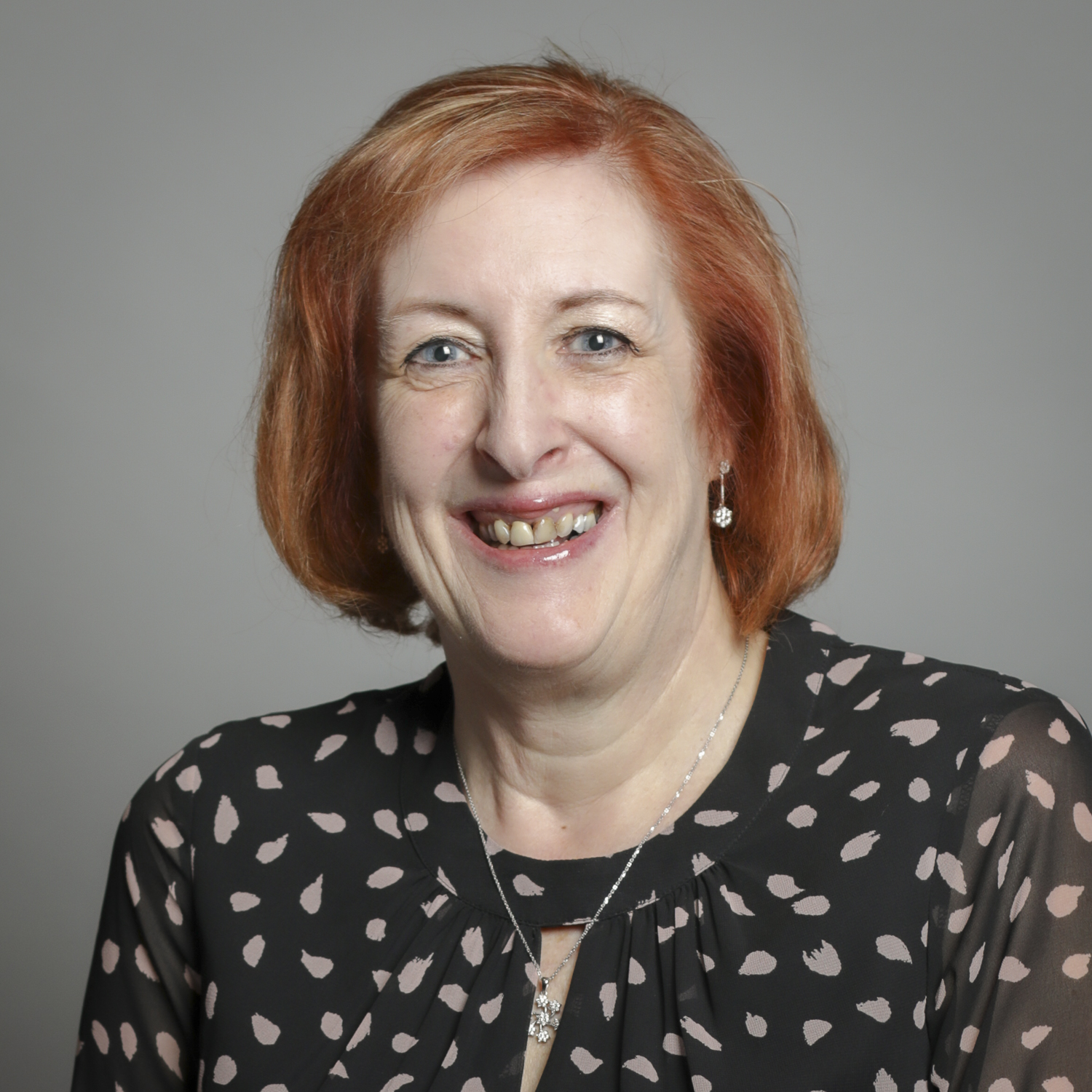
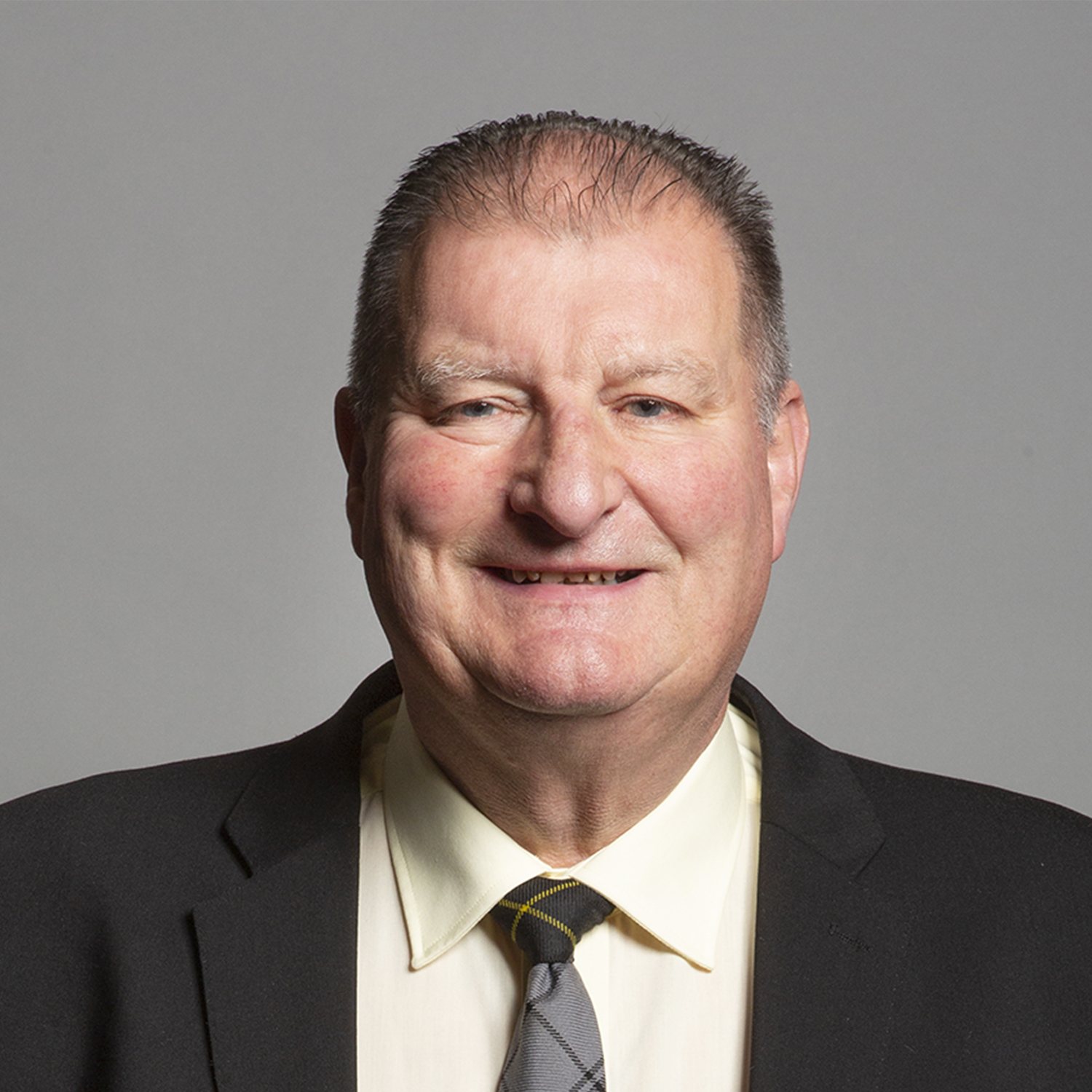
Members of the Committee (clockwise, from top left): Harriet Harman, Alberto Costa, Charles Walker, Bernard Jenkin, Allan Dorans, Yvonne Fovargue, Andy Carter

The committee was chaired by Labour MP Harriet Harman (Harman replaced Bryant in June 2022 and was unanimously voted chair by the other Committee members) and included four Conservative MPs (Alberto Costa, Charles Walker, Andy Carter, Bernard Jenkin), a second Labour MP (Yvonne Fovargue) and an SNP MP (Allan Dorans). The committee is traditionally chaired by an opposition MP. The chair only votes in the event of a tie, so the usual voting breakdown is four Conservatives, one Labour and one SNP MP. They met on 11 January 2023 to examine documents released by the Cabinet Office in late November 2022, soon after Sunak became prime minister. These include WhatsApp messages sent inside Downing Street, emails, Johnson's official diary and his briefing papers to prepare him for Prime Minister's Questions, and entry logs recording who went into 10 Downing Street on 13 November and 19 June 2020. The Telegraph described the question facing the committee in these terms: "Even Mr Johnson's allies accept he misled Parliament, in that information was given to MPs that turned out to be incorrect. The key question is whether he did so knowingly, deliberately."

Harman tweeted about Johnson and events in April 2022. Some Johnson supporters questioned her impartiality because of this. Harman privately offered to the Government to stand down as chair, but she was asked to continue.

As a former prime minister, and as the inquiry related to statements he made on behalf of the government, the government decided to pay Johnson's fees for legal support in the inquiry. However, while there was precedent for paying legal fees arising from public inquiries, there had not been a prior case where legal fees were paid for a Parliamentary inquiry. Originally £129,000 was made available. This was extended to an additional £90,000 in December 2022. The contract was due to expire 28 February 2023, but there was then a no cost extension to 30 April 2023. The Labour party have criticised the expenditure. In September 2023, the National Audit Office criticised the government's justification for paying a £265,000 bill for Boris Johnson's legal fees relating to Partygate, saying the government's reasoning for doing so was not "wholly persuasive" and that due process had not been followed when signing off the money.

== 3 March 2023 Committee publication ==
On 3 March 2023, the committee published its summary of issues to be raised with Johnson, including some previously unpublished photos of gatherings. It raised at least four occasions on which the Commons might have been misled when Johnson said regulations were followed, and suggested that breaches of COVID-19 guidance would have been obvious to Johnson. This report said there is evidence that advisors to Johnson were "struggling to contend that some gatherings were within the rules". For example, it quotes the then Downing Street communications director, Jack Doyle, as writing a WhatsApp message saying, "I'm struggling to come up with a way this one is in the rules" about the 2020 birthday gathering. Another WhatsApp message from 28 April 2021 by an unnamed Number 10 official said: "[No. 10 official]'s worried about leaks of PM having a piss up and to be fair I don't think it's unwarranted".

The 3 March report was reportedly published because Johnson's lawyers asked for details on what issues would be raised when he spoke to the committee, but the committee felt any response should be made public. The committee has first to decide if it thinks any of Johnson's statements were misleading, and if it does, it said it will then "consider whether that was inadvertent, reckless or intentional". Johnson said none of the evidence showed he "knowingly" misled parliament, and that "it is clear from this report that I have not committed any contempt of parliament". A Johnson spokesperson said the committee consisted of members who already "think Boris is guilty".

Around the same time, it was announced that Sue Gray had been offered the job of chief of staff to Keir Starmer, leader of the Labour Party. Some supporters of Johnson argued this undermined her earlier Partygate report. A spokesperson for the Privileges Committee stressed that their report was not based on Gray's work, but on evidence supplied by the government and from witnesses.

== 21 March 2023 Johnson document ==
Johnson submitted a response, the final version of which was delivered to the committee on the morning of 21 March 2023. It was published later that day by the committee.

Johnson's defence document acknowledged that his statements to Parliament were misleading, but argued that this was inadvertent. It set up possible key arguments for the subsequent hearings. Johnson argued that it was inappropriate of the committee to consider whether his statements were "reckless", that doing so unduly expands the scope of such investigations, and they should only be seeking to determine whether he his misleading statements were "intentional".

Johnson argued that the committee should only be examining the accuracy of his statements with respect to compliance with regulations, i.e. with what was legal or illegal, and not with respect to compliance with non-legally-binding guidance. However, the statements by Johnson under examination included claims he made that "all guidance was followed completely" at 10 Downing Street.

Johnson also argued that he was never told by advisers that any of the gatherings in question were against the rules. In some cases, he was specifically told they were within the rules. This, he argues, disputes the suggestion that he should have known gatherings were in breach of the rules. The defence document largely relies on advice from Johnson's then-communications chief, Jack Doyle, who was a political special adviser rather than a permanent civil servant. Cummings has claimed he did warn against the garden party, but Johnson argued that Cummings is not a reliable witness.

== Hearings ==
Johnson gave evidence before the committee on 22 March 2023. The hearing was televised.

On the morning of 22 March, the Committee released 110 pages of evidence, with redactions in places. The unredacted evidence was previously shared with Johnson a fortnight earlier. The evidence in the release was chosen by Johnson or the committee as it was to be referred to in the hearings.

This includes Cabinet Secretary Simon Case denying that he gave assurances to Johnson that rules or guidance were obeyed at all times in 10 Downing Street. It also has Lee Cain, then Downing Street Director of Communications, confirming Dominic Cummings at the time said the garden party should not take place and that he had discussed the matter with Johnson.

Martin Reynolds advised Johnson to not say guidance was always followed in his 8 December 2021 appearance at Prime Minister's Questions. Johnson agreed to delete this line from his response, but then, in the House, verbally said guidance had been followed.

Johnson appeared for three hours in front of the committee on the afternoon of 22 March in proceedings that were described as "tetchy" by the BBC and "frosty" by CNN, with Johnson raising his voice at times. He reiterated his view that he had not lied to Parliament. He also described the committee's processes as "manifestly unfair". However, he distanced himself from comments some of his supporters had made criticising the committee.

Johnson argued that gatherings to note the leaving of a staff member and for his birthday counted as "essential" work events under the COVID-19 rules in place, but committee members disagreed. Johnson argued that he did not deserve to receive the fine he was given.

Johnson argued that he received advice that all rules had been followed before speaking in Parliament, but the committee questioned that he largely meant advice from politically appointed media advisors, mainly Jack Doyle but also James Slack. They asked why he did not rely on what he had seen himself or why he had not sought advice from lawyers or senior civil servants. Johnson responded, "I asked the relevant people. They were senior people. They had been working very hard."

Following Johnson's March 2023 hearing, a Survation poll found 68% of the public did not believe Johnson when he said he believed he was following the rules.

== Subsequent events ==
Once the Committee had heard all the evidence, it worked on its conclusions. Johnson was then to be given a fortnight to respond, before the final report is published.

In May 2023, the Cabinet Office referred to the police evidence of possible further breaches of COVID-19 regulations by Johnson at 10 Downing Street and Chequers. The Privileges Committee met on 24 May and received legal advice that this was not a reason to delay their work.

== The Committee reports ==
The final report of the Committee's investigation into Boris Johnson

=== Johnson resignation ===
Johnson was sent a draft of the Committee's report on 8 June 2023, and given 14 days to respond to any criticisms. This recommended a suspension of more than 10 days from the Commons, which, if approved by the House, would trigger a recall petition in Johnson's constituency and a possible by-election.

Johnson announced his resignation as an MP on 9 June. He was critical of the Committee and insisted he never lied. He described the Committee as a "kangaroo court". He claimed their report was "riddled with inaccuracies and reek[ed] of prejudice". On 12 June 2023, Michael Gove said he disagreed with Johnson's description of the process as a "kangaroo court", saying he had "respect" for their work. The same day, Sunak also expressed support for the Committee.

Johnson's claim that he was being "forced out" was criticised, given the Committee's report had to be voted on by Parliament and then there would have been a recall petition and by-election. The BBC reported a former Cabinet ally as saying that Johnson would not have resigned if he had thought he would win the by-election.

In response, the Committee said it would meet on 12 June 2023 to conclude their work and publish their report earlier. They said, "Mr Johnson has departed from the processes of the House and has impugned the integrity of the House by his statement." Johnson sent a response to the report at 23:57 on 12 June 2023.

=== Final report ===
The Committee published their final report on 15 June. The Committee had voted on the final report text and unanimously supported it. They concluded that Johnson had deliberately misled the House, a contempt of Parliament. They said that, had he still been an MP, they would have recommended a 90-day suspension. If that had happened, it would have been the second longest suspension since 1949.

The Committee concluded that Johnson's actions were "more serious" because they were committed when he was Prime Minister. They noted that there was no precedent for a PM being found to have deliberately misled Parliament. The report stated that Johnson tried to "rewrite the meaning" of COVID rules "to fit his own evidence" for example that "a leaving gathering or a gathering to boost morale was a lawful reason to hold a gathering." They concluded he was guilty of further contempts of Parliament and that he breached confidentiality requirements by criticising the Committee's provisional findings when he resigned. They said he was complicit in a "campaign of abuse" against those investigating him.

13. We considered the nature and extent of Mr Johnson's culpability in misleading the House. In coming to the conclusion that Mr Johnson deliberately misled the House, we considered:

a) His repeated and continuing denials of the facts, for example his refusal to accept that there were insufficient efforts to enforce social distancing at gatherings where a lack of social distancing is documented in official photographs, and that he neither saw nor heard anything to alert him to the breaches that occurred.

b) The frequency with which he closed his mind to those facts and to what was obvious so that eventually the only conclusion that could be drawn was that he was deliberately closing his mind.

c) The fact that he sought to re-write the meaning of the Rules and Guidance to fit his own evidence, for example, his assertion that "imperfect" social distancing was perfectly acceptable when there were no mitigations in place rather than cancelling a gathering or holding it online, and his assertion that a leaving gathering or a gathering to boost morale was a lawful reason to hold a gathering.

d) His own after-the-event rationalisations, for example the nature and extent of the assurances he received, the words used, the purpose of the assurances, who they came from, the warning he received about that from Martin Reynolds (his Principal Private Secretary) and his failure to take advice from others whose advice would have been authoritative. His view about his own Fixed Penalty Notice (that he was baffled as to why he received it) is instructive.

14. We came to the view that some of Mr Johnson's denials and explanations were so disingenuous that they were by their very nature deliberate attempts to mislead the Committee and the House, while others demonstrated deliberation because of the frequency with which he closed his mind to the truth.

— Committee of Privileges, "Matter referred on 21 April 2022 (conduct of Rt Hon Boris Johnson): Final Report – Report Summary"

=== Initial reaction ===
The BBC's political editor, Chris Mason, wrote, "This is a report – in breadth and depth – that demolishes Boris Johnson's character and conduct." BBC political correspondent Rob Watson wrote, "If you think about the several hundred year history of parliament, there's nothing like this." Reuters described the report as "damning". French newspaper Libération likewise called it "accablant" ("damning").

A spokesperson for the Covid-19 Bereaved Families for Justice UK group, David Garfinkel, said, "[Johnson] should never be allowed to stand for any form of public office again".

In The Spectator, Brendan O'Neill said the findings of the committee with respect to Johnson's dishonesty "are not wholly convincing". He concluded that he fears "that the fallout from partygate poses a larger threat to democracy than partygate itself".

Johnson released a statement that said it was "a dreadful day for MPs and for democracy", accused the committee of functioning in "anti-democratic way" and that "It is for the people of this country to decide who sits in Parliament, not [committee chair] Harriet Harman". Johnson was supported by allies including Nadine Dorries, who called the report "quite bizarre" and said "any Conservative MP who would vote for this report is fundamentally not a Conservative", as well as Brendan Clarke-Smith, Simon Clarke, James Duddridge, Jake Berry, Michael Fabricant, Andrea Jenkyns and Zac Goldsmith. Conservative minister Jacob Rees-Mogg stated that the committee had "over-egged their particular pudding and made themselves look vindictive and actually therefore helped Boris Johnson".

Former Conservative minister Michael Heseltine said, "We've had four days of this report and the story doesn't change: Boris Johnson told a pack of lies. Boris Johnson got out from under, he saw it coming, he knew he hadn't a case to defend. So he resigned before the suspension that he feared could be relevant."

Chris Bryant called Johnson a "scoundrel" who "repeatedly lied" and the publication of the report meant that justice had finally been served.

=== Commons vote ===
The Commons debated the report on 19 June 2023.

The Conservative Party have said the vote on the report would be a free vote for Conservative MPs. On 18 June 2023, Secretary of State for Levelling Up, Housing and Communities Michael Gove said he would abstain. Some right-wing Conservative MPs said that they felt the proposed 90-day suspension was too harsh and would also be abstaining. Beforehand, Johnson had asked his supporters not to vote against the report and some of them abstained whilst others did not appear for the vote at all.

The Leader of the House of Commons, Penny Mordaunt, started the debate by tabling the government's motion to approve the Privileges Committee's report into Boris Johnson's conduct, and was the first Cabinet member to express her support for the report. Other prominent Conservatives supporting the report included former PM Theresa May; former Cabinet member Andrea Leadsom; Tobias Ellwood, chair of the Defence Committee; and Father of the House Sir Peter Bottomley.

Thangam Debbonaire, Shadow Leader of the House, for Labour said that Sunak should have blocked Johnson's resignation honours list.

Labour forced a vote on the report. The Commons voted 354 to 7 in support of the report, with a large number of abstentions. This was an absolute majority of the Commons. 118 Conservative MPs, including 15 ministers, voted for the report and 225 abstained. Voting against the report were Conservative MPs Desmond Swayne, Bill Cash, Nick Fletcher, Adam Holloway, Karl McCartney, Joy Morrissey and Heather Wheeler.

Sunak had earlier said that he had other commitments. He did not attend the debate and refused to say how he would have voted. When later pressed by ITV he said he did not want to influence the way other MPs might vote, saying it was "a matter for the House rather than the government".

== Report on alleged interference with the work of the Committee ==
On 19 June, chair Harriet Harman confirmed that the Committee was preparing a second report on MPs who had sought to "intimidate" the Committee. The report was released on 29 June 2023; it accused ten Conservatives of interfering with the Committee's investigation into Boris Johnson. The report named former ministers Nadine Dorries, Sir Jacob Rees-Mogg, and Dame Priti Patel; serving Foreign Office Minister Lord Zac Goldsmith; MPs Mark Jenkinson, Sir Michael Fabricant, Brendan Clarke-Smith and Dame Andrea Jenkyns; and peers Lord Cruddas and Lord Greenhalgh. They were said to have rejected the accusations, complaining that "the committee was trying to shut down freedom of speech".

The report suggested attempts to "impugn the integrity of the committee" or "lobby or intimidate" committee members could be a contempt of parliament. The Commons will vote on this special report following a debate on 10 July.

The Liberal Democrats pointed out that four of the MPs who were named – Patel, Rees-Mogg, Fabricant and Jenkyns – had been put forward for honours by Johnson in his September 2022 resignation honours list. They called for an investigation into whether there had been "collusion" between Johnson and these individuals.

Labour and the Liberal Democrats called for Goldsmith to be dismissed following the publication of the Committee's report. A Downing Street spokesman said that Sunak retained full confidence in Goldsmith as a minister. The next day, 30 June 2023, Goldsmith resigned from his ministerial position without mentioning the committee's investigation. He said government's "apathy" towards environmental issues made his position "untenable". In his reply to Goldsmith, Sunak said Goldsmith was asked to apologise for his comments regarding the committee and had not done so. He had expressed support in a tweet for the view that the inquiry was a "witch hunt" and a "kangaroo court". Goldsmith responded in the media, saying, "as a minister I shouldn't have commented publicly".

On 6 July, answering questions in front of the Liaison Committee, Sunak said he had not fully read this second report.

On 10 July, the Commons approved the second report without the need for a vote. Sunak did not attend the debate.
