= Ann Sindall =

Boris Johnson's personal assistant

Ann Sindall DBE
- Born: Batley, West Yorkshire, England
- Occupations: Personal assistant, Director
- Employer: The Office of Boris Johnson Ltd
- Known for: Long-time personal assistant to Boris Johnson
- Title: Director
- Awards: Dame Commander of the Order of the British Empire (DBE)

Dame Ann Sindall DBE was Boris Johnson's secretary or personal assistant while he was editor of The Spectator and Mayor of London. She was appointed Dame Commander of the Order of the British Empire (DBE) in Johnson's Resignation Honours, announced on 9 June 2023, for political and public service. Robert Peston tweeted that "The most interesting Johnson honour is the dame-hood for Ann Sindall, his loyal assistant for decades and who probably knows the former prime minister better than almost anyone".

Sonia Purnell, in her 2012 book Just Boris: A Tale of Blond Ambition, describes Sindall's role as Johnson's secretary at The Spectator. She is said to have been described as "almost a pantomime Northerner ... like Boris is a pantomime toff". Purnell describes Sindall as "redoubtable, crop-haired ... with her crisp Northern humour and 'socialist' tendencies", and quotes a colleague as saying that she ran the Spectator office "with the implacable demeanour of a headmistress trained by the SAS". She had a Jack Russell Terrier called Harry which accompanied her to the office.

In November 2022 Sindall became the director of The Office of Boris Johnson Ltd, succeeding Shelley Williams-Walker.

Sindall is from Batley, West Yorkshire.
