= Jean-Christophe Gray =

British civil servant

Jean-Christophe Gray CBE, LVO

Private Secretary to the Prince of Wales
- In office September 2022 – March 2024
- Preceded by: Clive Alderton (as Private Secretary to Prince Charles)
- Succeeded by: Ian Patrick

Private Secretary to the Duke of Cambridge
- In office February 2021 – September 2022
- Preceded by: Christian Jones
- Succeeded by: himself (as Private Secretary to the Prince of Wales)

Prime Minister's Official Spokesperson
- In office 2012–2015
- Prime Minister: David Cameron
- Preceded by: Steve Field
- Succeeded by: Helen Bower

Personal details
- Born: Jean-Christophe Nicholas Gray; November 1975 (age 50)
- Education: University of Oxford; London School of Economics

Jean-Christophe Nicholas Gray, CBE, LVO (born November 1975) is a former British civil servant who served as the Prime Minister's official spokesperson for David Cameron between 2012 and 2015. He later served as the Private Secretary to William, Prince of Wales between 2021 and 2024, and in early 2025 led the newly-formed National Infrastructure and Service Transformation Authority (NISTA) pending its appointment of a permanent chief executive.

== Career ==
Gray read Modern History at the University of Oxford (1994–1997) and went on to earn an MSc degree in European Politics & Policy from the London School of Economics (1997–1998).

Gray was appointed a Commander of the Order of the British Empire (CBE) in the 2015 dissolution honours for public service.

In February 2021, he became the Private Secretary to then-Prince William, Duke of Cambridge. He stepped down from the role in March 2024 and was succeeded by Ian Patrick. In the 2024 King's Birthday Honours, Gray was appointed a Lieutenant of the Royal Victorian Order (LVO) for his services.

In early 2025, Gray led the newly-formed National Infrastructure and Service Transformation Authority (NISTA) pending its appointment of a permanent chief executive.

He is also the Head of the Delivery Unit in 10 Downing Street.

According to The Times, "Jean-Christophe Gray has a reputation as Whitehall's most assiduous bean counter".

Court offices
| Preceded by Clive Alderton as Private Secretary to Prince Charles | Private Secretary to the Prince of Wales; 2022–2024 | Succeeded by Ian Patrick |
Government offices
| Preceded by Steve Field | Prime Minister's Official Spokesperson; 2012–2015 | Succeeded by Helen Bower |
