= Shelley Williams-Walker =

Adviser to Boris Johnson

Dame Michelle Williams-Walker DBE, known as Shelley Williams-Walker, is a senior advisor to Boris Johnson. She is a former Special adviser and was head of operations for Johnson when he was Prime Minister of the United Kingdom.

In January 2022 The Daily Telegraph described a gathering held in 10 Downing Street on 16 April 2021 while indoor social gatherings were forbidden because of the COVID-19 pandemic, at which "Shelley Williams-Walker ... was in charge of the music at points, according to one eye-witness", and after which she was reportedly nicknamed "DJ SWW".

In October 2022 she became the first director of The Office of Boris Johnson Ltd, but was succeeded in November 2022 by Ann Sindall.

Williams-Walker was appointed Dame Commander of the Order of the British Empire (DBE) in Johnson's Resignation Honours in June 2023, for political and public service.

In the 2023 Channel 4 docudrama Partygate, she was played by Alice Lowe.
