= 2022 Prime Minister's Resignation Honours (Boris Johnson) =

British government recognitions

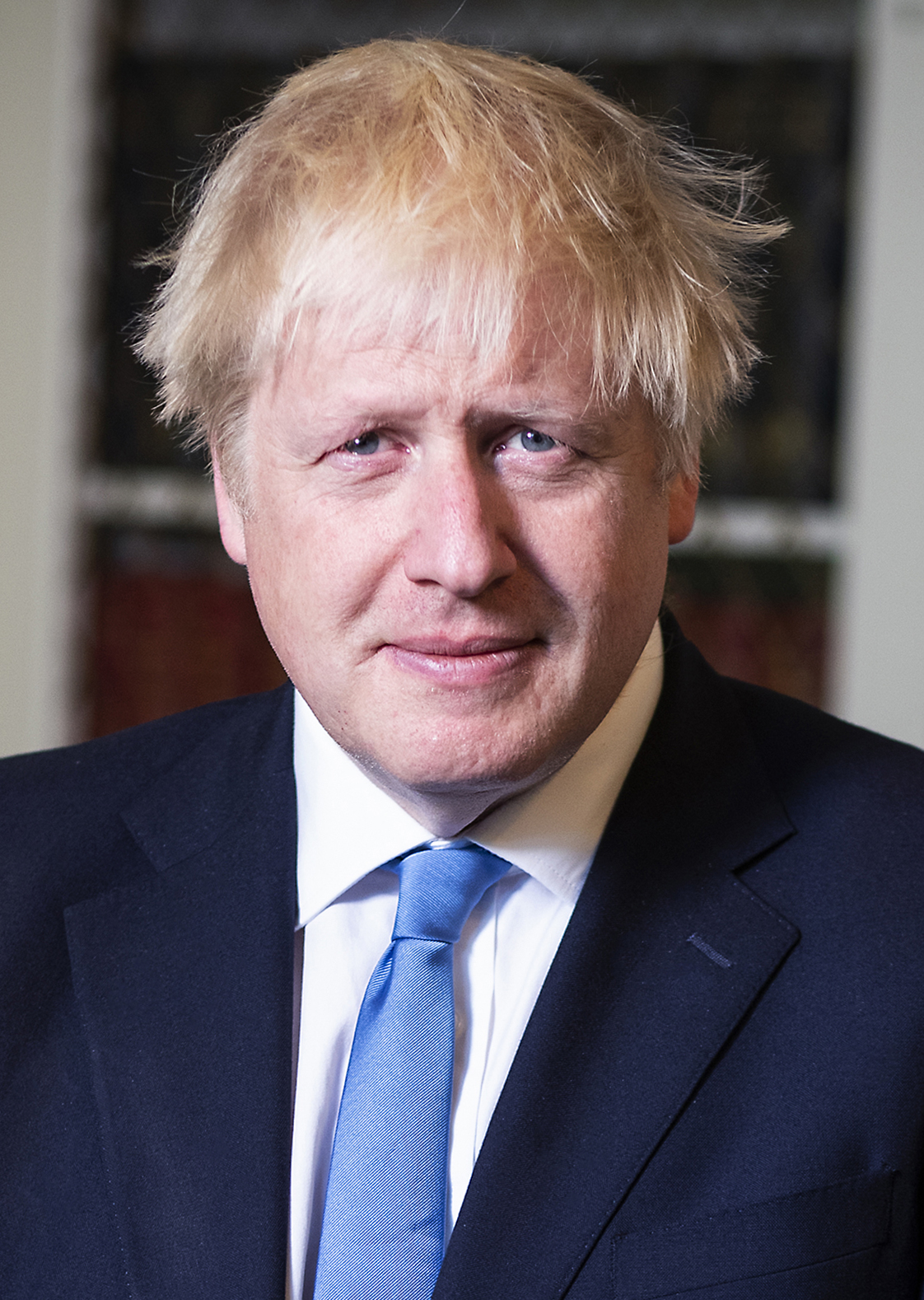
Boris Johnson in 2019

The 2022 Prime Minister's Resignation Honours are honours awarded following the September 2022 resignation of the prime minister, Boris Johnson.

== Background ==
Following his resignation as prime minister in September 2022, Boris Johnson compiled a list of those he thought deserving of honours. This list is different from the Political Honours list announced on 14 October 2022 that had been drawn up and submitted for scrutiny before Johnson's resignation.

In June 2023, The Times reported that incumbent Prime Minister Rishi Sunak had approved the honours list. The honours were published by the Cabinet Office on 9 June 2023 and gazetted on 21 July 2023 (backdated to 9 June).

== Controversy ==
A disagreement subsequently broke out between Johnson and Sunak, with the BBC reporting that eight of Johnson's nominations were rejected by the House of Lords Appointments Commission. The identity of these eight individuals is uncertain but there is speculation that they include former Culture Secretary Nadine Dorries and Johnson ally Nigel Adams, who both subsequently resigned from the House of Commons.

There was also controversy as Johnson gave honours for various people involved in Partygate events, including Martin Reynolds, Shaun Bailey (at the 14 December 2020 gathering at Conservative Campaign Headquarters), Ben Mallet (at the 14 December 2020 gathering at Conservative Campaign Headquarters), Shelley Williams-Walker (at the 15 April 2021 party), Jack Doyle (at an 18 December 2020 event), Dan Rosenfield (in office during the period of Partygate events), and Rosie Bate-Williams (a press adviser who handled some of Johnson's denials).

On 29 June 2023, four of the MPs in the honours list, Sir Jacob Rees-Mogg, Dame Priti Patel, Sir Michael Fabricant and Dame Andrea Jenkyns, were accused (along with six other Conservatives) by the House of Commons Committee of Privileges of interfering with their investigation into Johnson's comments to Parliament about Partygate. The House of Commons subsequently endorsed the Committee's report.

== Life peerages ==
- Shaun Bailey, a Conservative member of the London Assembly, to be Baron Bailey of Paddington, of Paddington in the City of Westminster
- Benjamin Gascoigne, former political secretary and deputy chief of staff to Johnson whilst prime minister, to be Baron Gascoigne, of Pendle in the County of Lancashire.
- Ben Houchen, Tees Valley Mayor, to be Baron Houchen of High Leven, of Ingleby Barwick in the Borough of Stockton-on-Tees.
- Ross John Kempsell, Political Director of the Conservative Party and Director of the Conservative Research Department, to be Baron Kempsell, of Letchworth in the County of Hertfordshire.
- Charlotte Kathryn Tranter Owen, former special advisor to Johnson, to be Baroness Owen of Alderley Edge, of Alderley Edge in the County of Cheshire.
- Kulveer Singh Ranger, former Director of Transport for Johnson whilst Mayor of London, and special advisor to the British government on digital strategy, to be Baron Ranger of Northwood, of Pimlico in the City of Westminster.
- Daniel Robert Rosenfield, former Downing Street Chief of Staff for Johnson, to be Baron Rosenfield, of Muswell Hill in the London Borough of Haringey.

== Order of the Companions of Honour ==
=== Member (CH) ===
- Sir William Nigel Paul Cash MP, Chair of the European Scrutiny Committee, for political and public service

== Knights Bachelor ==
- The Right Honourable Conor Burns MP, former Minister of State at the Northern Ireland Office, for political and public service
- The Right Honourable Simon Richard Clarke MP, former Secretary of State for Levelling Up, Housing and Communities and Chief Secretary to the Treasury, for political and public service
- Benjamin William Elliot, former Co-Chair of the Conservative Party, for political and public service
- Michael Louis David Fabricant MP, Conservative MP for Lichfield, for political and public service
- William John Lewis, Political Adviser to The Rt Hon. Boris Johnson MP, for political and public service
- The Right Honourable Jacob William Rees-Mogg MP, former Minister of State for Brexit Opportunities and Government Efficiency, for political and public service

== Order of the Bath ==
=== Companion of the Order of the Bath (CB) ===
- Martin Alexander Baillie Reynolds CMG, former principal private secretary to the prime minister, for public service

== Order of the British Empire ==
=== Dames Commander of the Order of the British Empire (DBE) ===
- Andrea Marie Jenkyns MP, former Assistant Whip and Minister for Skills, for political and public service
- The Right Honourable Amanda Anne Milling MP, former Minister without Portfolio, for political and public service
- The Right Honourable Priti Patel MP, former home secretary, for political and public service
- Ann Sindall, Personal Assistant to The Rt Hon. Boris Johnson MP, for political and public service
- Michelle Williams-Walker, former special adviser and head of operations for the prime minister, for political and public service

=== Commanders of the Order of the British Empire (CBE) ===
- Guto Harri, former director of communications at Downing Street and London City Hall, for political and public service
- Rosemary Bate-Williams, former press secretary to the prime minister, for political and public service
- David Joseph Blair, former foreign affairs speechwriter to the prime minister and former chief foreign correspondent for The Daily Telegraph, for public service
- Colin Cromarty Bloom, former faith engagement advisor to the prime minister, for political and public service
- Henry Charles Rixar Cook, former special adviser to the prime minister, for political and public service
- Jack Doyle, former Downing Street director of communications, for political and public service
- Roisha Maria Hughes, former principal private secretary to the mayor of London, for public service
- Ray Arthur Lewis, former deputy mayor of London, for political and public service

=== Officers of the Order of the British Empire (OBE) ===
- David Bruno John Canzini, former political advisor to the prime minister, for political and public service
- Samantha Helen Cohen CVO, former Director of the Office of the Prime Minister, for political and public service
- Alexander Karczewski Crowley, former political adviser to the prime minister, for political and public service
- Rebecca Rose Haggar Kaikitis, Councillor, London Borough of Hillingdon, for political and public service
- Samantha Geraldine Harrison, former interim Permanent Secretary and Chief Operating Officer of the Office of the Prime Minister, for public service
- Benjamin Robert Mallet, former Strategy Director for the General Election and London Campaign Director, for political and public service
- Robert Mark Raymond Oxley, former Press Secretary at Downing Street, for political and public service
- Daniel James Ritterband, former Head of the Mayor of London Campaign, for political and public service
- Sarah Elizabeth Rebecca Vaughan-Brown, former Personal Adviser to Carrie Johnson, for political and public service
- Dr William Gerald Winter Warr, Senior Vice President, Global Health Strategy at BioNTech, former Senior Special Adviser to the Prime Minister on Health, Social Care and Life Sciences, for political and public service
- Catherine Grace Rostron, Senior Parliamentary Assistant and Special Adviser to the Rt Hon Boris Johnson MP, for political and public service

=== Members of the Order of the British Empire (MBE) ===
- Kelly Jo Dodge, long-time Parliamentary hairdresser, for Parliamentary service
- Andrea Laybourne, former Parliamentary Secretary to the Rt Hon Boris Johnson MP, for political and public service
- Richard John Mark, Senior Parliamentary Assistant to the Rt Hon Boris Johnson MP, for political and public service
- Gregory Alexander Munro, Senior Assistant and Adviser to the Rt Hon Boris Johnson MP, for political and public service
- Alexander Joseph Bryan Simpson, former Parliamentary and Constituency Secretary to the Rt Hon Boris Johnson MP, for political and public service
- Lynda Teresa Summers, former projects and events manager for London Borough of Hillingdon, for public service
