= Enemies of the people (headline) =

2016 front-page headline in the Daily Mail

Front cover of the Daily Mail, 4 November 2016

"Enemies of the people" was the headline to an article by British newspaper the Daily Mail's political editor James Slack, published on 4 November 2016. The headline and associated article were about the three judges who had ruled the UK Government would require the consent of Parliament to give notice of Brexit. The headline was widely criticised as being inappropriately condemnatory and attracted numerous complaints, given the British judiciary is independent of the Government. The court had ruled on the question of whether the Constitution of the United Kingdom permitted the government to use the royal prerogative to invoke Article 50, or whether it would need to be authorised by an explicit act of Parliament to do so.

== Background ==
The headline, written by James Slack and approved by editor Paul Dacre, was in response to the ruling of the High Court of England and Wales in the Miller case that the government would need to gain the consent of Parliament before it could trigger Article 50 and exit the European Union (EU). The government had intended to use the royal prerogative to invoke Article 50, after a referendum in June 2016 had resulted in a 52%–48% majority vote to leave.

The Daily Mail claimed the court's decision purposely blocked the Brexit process and ran the story and headline about the three high court judges – the Lord Chief Justice, Lord Thomas, Master of the Rolls Sir Terence Etherton, and Lord Justice Sales. The Mail Online also initially described Etherton as an "openly-gay ex-Olympic fencer", but this was changed after criticism on social media. Former Lord Chief Justice Igor Judge said the newspaper's attacking comments, particularly the homophobia concerns, were "very unpleasant".

== Aftermath ==
The Independent Press Standards Organisation received over 1,000 complaints about the piece, claiming it violated numerous Codes of Conduct including inaccuracy, harassment and discrimination. A Business Insider report strongly criticised the Daily Mail story as being "distorted" and could be construed as an attempt to harm the reputation and safety of the judges. In November 2016, the Bishop of Leeds, Nick Baines said the public should be "very alarmed" over the Daily Mail piece. Lord Neuberger spoke out about the press criticism of judges in an interview broadcast by the BBC in February 2017.

In response to the criticism of the High Court ruling by newspapers, including the Daily Mail, the Secretary of State for Justice, Liz Truss, issued a three-line statement defending the independence and impartiality of the judiciary more than a day after being asked by the Bar Council to comment. The chairwoman of the Bar Council, Chantal-Aimee Doerries QC, said that Truss should have clearly defended the judiciary and condemned the attacks made by the Daily Mail and similar stories in the newspapers Daily Express and The Sun. Truss's brief response was seen as inadequate. Former Conservative minister Anna Soubry said that Truss "has a duty to condemn the vilification, including a homophobic attack, of our judiciary".

The government appealed against the High Court decision. In January 2017, the Supreme Court dismissed the appeal, which Lord Neuberger summarised as "the government cannot trigger Article 50 without an Act of Parliament". The same month, the Bar Council launched a scheme to teach secondary school children about the importance and impartiality of the British judiciary. Slack was later appointed as prime minister Theresa May's official spokesman.

Truss later told the House of Lords Constitution Committee: "I think it is dangerous for a Government minister to say 'this is an acceptable headline and this isn’t an acceptable headline' because I am a huge believer in the independence of the judiciary, I am also a very strong believer in the free press". Lord Thomas condemned Truss's comments, saying she was "completely and utterly wrong" to say the media could not be criticised.

On 19 April 2017, following the Prime Minister's decision to call a snap election, the Daily Mail ran a similar Brexit-related headline, "Crush the saboteurs". This did not attack the judiciary but focused on the "unelected" House of Lords and called people who voted for Britain to remain in the EU "remoaners". The Mail defended its headline, describing criticism of it as left-wing "hysteria"; after the headline was compared to the rhetoric of Joseph Stalin, the Mail responded by pointing out that it was opposed to genocide. May distanced herself from the sentiments of the headline, saying it was an inaccurate summation of her reasons for calling a general election.

In November 2023, then-Conservative MP Brendan Clarke-Smith reacted to the Supreme Court's blocking of the Rwanda asylum plan by sharing an image of the headline accompanied by the caption "We've been here before". Clarke-Smith later clarified that his comment was intended as "a reminder that the people of this country have felt their democratic choices haven’t been implemented".
