= Prime Minister's Official Spokesperson (UK) =

British government official

- Royal Arms as used by His Majesty's Government
- Incumbent; Tom Wells since October 2025
- Prime Minister's Office
- Appointer: Prime minister
- First holder: Alastair Campbell
- Website: www.number10.gov.uk

The prime minister's official spokesperson or alternatively prime minister's official spokesman/spokeswoman is a position in the British Civil Service, located in the Prime Minister's Office in 10 Downing Street and used by the British prime minister to convey information to the public. The prime minister's official spokesperson usually addresses a small group of press and media correspondents, known as lobby correspondents, each morning to deliver statements on current events on behalf of the prime minister. Tom Wells has held the position since October 2025.

== List of prime minister's spokespeople ==
Spokesperson	Years	Prime Minister
Alastair Campbell	1997–2001	Tony Blair
Godric Smith	2001–2004	Tony Blair
Tom Kelly	2004–2007	Tony Blair
Michael Ellam	2007–2009	Gordon Brown
Simon Lewis	2009–2010	Gordon Brown
Steve Field	2010–2012	David Cameron
Jean-Christophe Gray	2012–2015	David Cameron
Helen Bower	2015–2016	David Cameron
Helen Bower	2016–2017	Theresa May
James Slack	2017–2019	Theresa May
James Slack	2019–2021	Boris Johnson
Jamie Davies (Acting)	2021	Boris Johnson
Max Blain	2021–2022	Boris Johnson
Max Blain	2022	Liz Truss
Max Blain	2022–2023	Rishi Sunak
David Pares	2023–2024	Rishi Sunak
David Pares	2024–2025	Keir Starmer
Tom Wells	2025–2026	Keir Starmer
Tom Wells	2026–present	Andy Burnham
