= Guto Harri =

Welsh broadcaster, writer and communications consultant

Guto Harri CBE
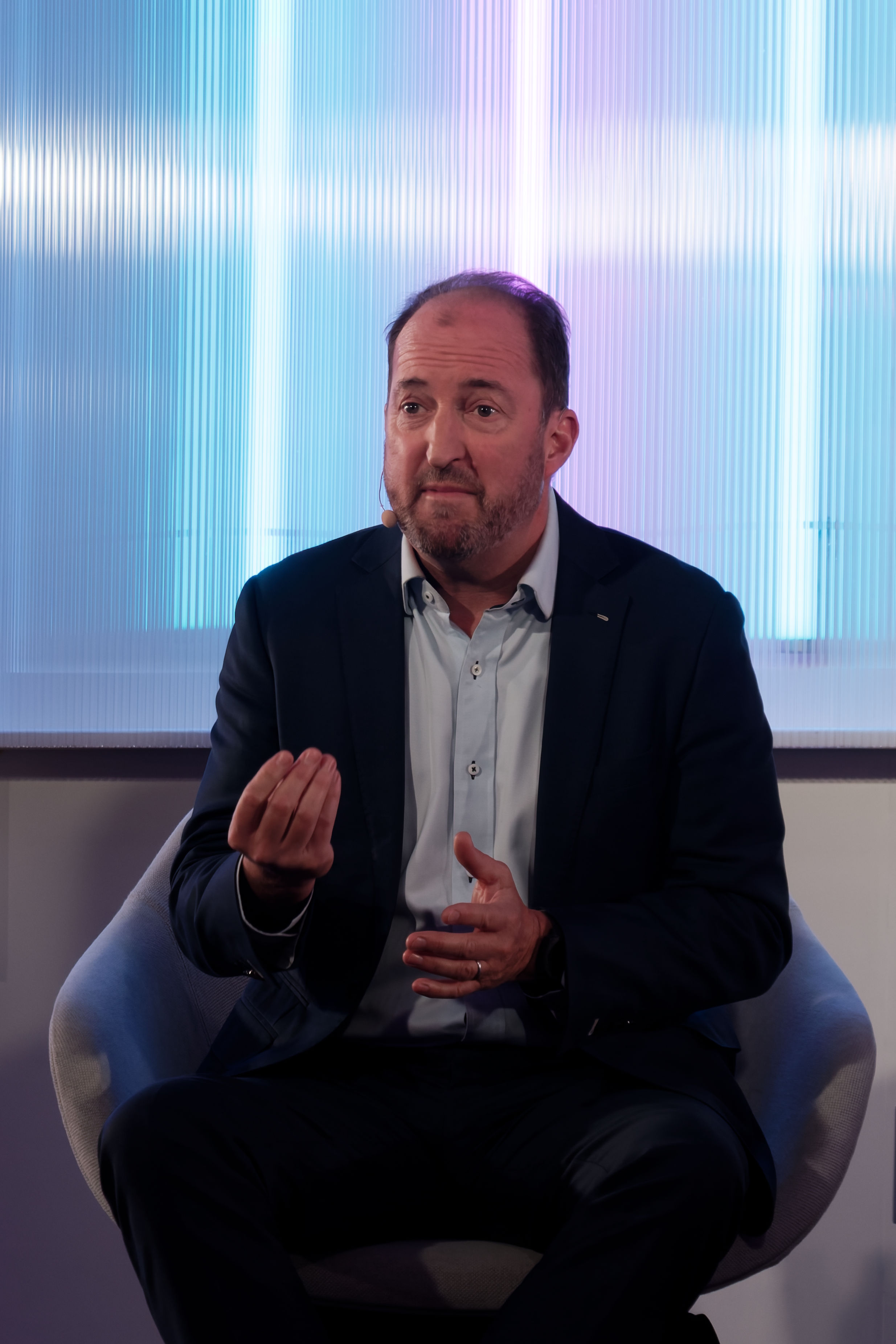
- Harri in 2026

Downing Street Director of Communications
- In office 5 February 2022 – 6 September 2022
- Prime Minister: Boris Johnson
- Preceded by: Jack Doyle
- Succeeded by: Simon McGee (Director of Government Communications)
- Succeeded by: Adam Jones (Political Director of Communications)

Personal details
- Born: 8 July 1966 (age 59) Cardiff, Wales, UK
- Children: 3
- Education: Queen's College, Oxford (BA); Cardiff University (PGDip)

Guto Harri CBE (Welsh: [ˈɡɪtɔ ˈhariː]; born 8 July 1966) is a Welsh broadcaster, writer and strategic communications consultant. He most recently served as Downing Street Director of Communications, having been appointed by Boris Johnson in February 2022.

Harri spent 18 years as a journalist at the BBC. From 2008 to 2012 he was director of external affairs for Mayor of London Boris Johnson. He worked at News International from 2012 to 2015, Liberty Global from 2016 to 2017, Hanover Communications from 2018 to 2020, and Hawthorn Advisors from 2020 to 2022.

In May 2021, Harri joined GB News as a presenter; he was suspended and resigned in July 2021 after he took the knee on air. In February 2022, Harri was appointed Downing Street Director of Communications by Prime Minister Johnson, following the resignation of Jack Doyle, and left the post in September 2022.

== Early life and education ==
Guto Harri was born in Cardiff to writer and psychiatrist Harri Pritchard-Jones and Lenna (née Harries). A native Welsh speaker, he studied at Tonyrefail School and Ysgol Bryntaf, before attending Ysgol Gyfun Llanhari. After school Harri attended The Queen's College, Oxford, where he studied philosophy, politics and economics. He then undertook a postgraduate course in broadcast journalism at Cardiff University.

== Career ==
=== Television ===
He started his career in Welsh-language radio before moving into network radio and television. He remained a regular contributor on the S4C news programme Newyddion (“News”) as well as on a number of historical documentaries for S4C. He later presented a number of BBC Wales' main election programmes.

Harri was a regular presenter on BBC television and radio programmes such as The World at One, Westminster Live, Straight Talk, Despatch Box and The World This Weekend. He covered the collapse of communism in Romania, Czechoslovakia and East Germany before reporting on the Gulf War from Saudi Arabia, Jordan and northern Iraq. He became the BBC's chief political correspondent in November 2002 and also presented the weekly interview programme, One To One. He moved briefly to Rome from July 2004 to January 2005 and then became North America business correspondent based in New York City until June 2007.

Harri was appointed as a trustee of S4C in 2014, and he was a member of the S4C Authority from 2014 to 2018.

Since June 2018, he has presented the S4C current affairs television programme, Y Byd yn ei Le. S4C confirmed that he would not continue hosting the programme following his appointment as Downing Street Director of Communications.

In May 2021, it was announced that Harri would be joining GB News as co-host of a weekly news and discussion programme. On 13 July 2021, Harri took the knee on GB News to show support for the England football team's kneeling for anti-racism; following backlash from viewers, GB News suspended him indefinitely for failing to maintain the editorial standards expected by the network. Shortly afterwards, he resigned from GB News, having written in The Sunday Times that the channel was "becoming an absurd parody" that was replicating cancel culture on the far right.

=== Public relations ===
After leaving the BBC at the end of 2007, he was approached to work for Conservative Party leader David Cameron, but joined London public relations agency Fleishman-Hillard as a senior policy advisor, reportedly spending four days as an adviser to Zimbabwe opposition leader Morgan Tsvangirai.

In May 2008, he was appointed communications director for Mayor of London Boris Johnson's administration at London City Hall. Harri joined News UK in May 2012 as a director of communications and corporate affairs, but left in December 2015, remarking that he was leaving with the "job done" after the fallout over phone hacking at the company.

He then joined Virgin Media owner Liberty Global in February 2016 as their managing director of external communications. He left the role in December 2017.

In May 2018, Harri took a part-time role with London PR firm Hanover Communications as a vice president, for GQ magazine as a contributing political editor, and also for Hydro Industries, a water treatment company based in Llanelli where he is a director.

=== Brexit/Boris Johnson ===
Harri is a critic of Brexit. After Johnson likened Prime Minister Theresa May's Chequers Brexit agreement to a "suicide vest" around the British constitution in September 2018, Harri criticised Johnson for "[joking] about suicide vests" and being "sexually incontinent", saying he was "digging his political grave" with his comments. He also said Johnson had become "more tribal, and tribal within the tribe, so that he would now be—if he were to become leader—a hugely divisive figure".

Harri was a board director of Hawthorn Advisors, a communications consultancy based in London and co-founded by Conservative Party co-chair Ben Elliot in 2013. Hawthorn advised and lobbied the government on behalf of Huawei, a firm with close ties to the Chinese government that has been accused of spying on 5G networks in the UK and other Western nations. Harri personally met with top executives from Huawei, including the company's vice-president, in 2020.

Harri was critical of Boris Johnson over parties held in Downing Street and Westminster during COVID-19 lockdowns, although he has argued that people were losing their "sense of perspective" over the controversy. After a wave of resignations from Boris Johnson's team at 10 Downing Street in February 2022 in light of the scandal, he became Downing Street Director of Communications, replacing Jack Doyle.

Harri left his Director of Communications post on 6 September 2022, the same day that Johnson resigned as Prime Minister.

== Family and personal life ==
Harri grew up in Rhondda Cynon Taf. He married his wife, Shireen, in 2000 and has three children. In 2005, Harri published an advertisement in the Western Mail seeking a Welsh-speaking nanny for their two children while he worked for the BBC in New York City, in which he argued for the importance of the language in bringing up his children. Outside work he says he enjoys rowing, sailing, fishing and cooking.

Harri is a non-executive board member of the Hay Festival. He was previously a trustee for UK-based cultural non-governmental organisation Visiting Arts. Harri is trained and serves as a volunteer crew member on the River Thames for the Royal National Lifeboat Institution. He holds an honorary doctorate from the University of South Wales.

He was appointed a Commander of the Order of the British Empire in the 2022 Prime Minister's Resignation Honours for political and public service.

Media offices
Preceded by Nick Robinson	Chief Political Correspondent: BBC News; 2002–2004	Succeeded by James Landale
Government offices
Preceded by Jack Doyle	Downing Street Director of Communications; 2022–present	Incumbent
