= Y Byd yn ei Le =

- Presented by: Guto Harri
- Country of origin: Wales
- Original language: Welsh

Production
- Running time: 30mins
- Production company: ITV Cymru Wales

Original release
- Network: S4C
- Release: 12 June 2018

Y Byd yn ei Le (English: The World in its Place) is a Welsh television current affairs series broadcast on S4C since 2018. It was presented by the former BBC Chief Political Correspondent, Guto Harri, until 2022.

== Background ==
The first programme of Y Byd yn ei Le was broadcast on S4C on 12 June 2018 and included an interview by the programme's presenter Guto Harri, with UK Prime Minister Theresa May, during her visit to the Welsh Conservative Conference. As well as interviews with prominent Wales and UK politicians, the programme aimed to bridge the gap between politicians and people on the ground in their towns and communities. Each programme normally includes a street 'surgery' where a politician answers questions directly to members of the public in a Welsh town or city. The first programme had Wales Assembly member Eluned Morgan meeting people in Ammanford.

In the Autumn of 2018 S4C commissioned two more series of the programme.

Young journalist Elen Davies joined the programme as a co-presenter in February 2019.

== Notable events ==
In September 2018 Harri interviewed controversial personality Katie Hopkins about her anti-Welsh language views. This received some criticism for giving Hopkins a 'platform' for her views. Harri responded that "We challenge and expose flaws... Outrageous views need confronting." S4C released the interview online on 27 September and broadcast a shorter clip in the programme on Tuesday 3 October 2018.

Two days before the 2019 general election, Harri interviewed UK Prime Minister Boris Johnson, for Y Byd yn ei Le. Johnson was questioned about Brexit and the recent resignation of the Conservative's Secretary of State for Wales, Alun Cairns.
