= Helen Bower-Easton =

British civil servant

Helen Bower-Easton CBE
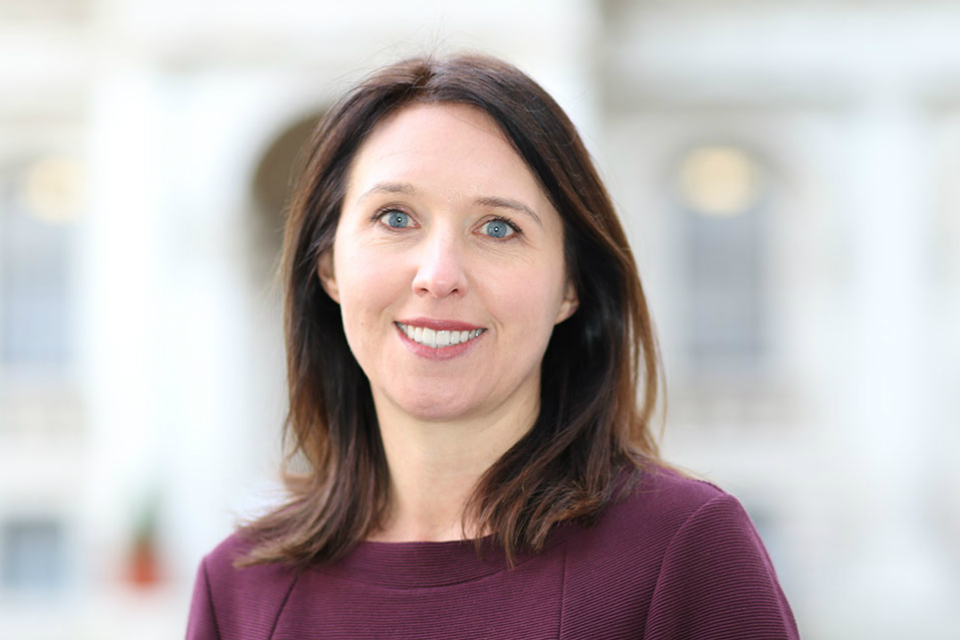

Prime Minister's Official Spokesperson
- In office 2016–2017
- Prime Minister: Theresa May
- Succeeded by: James Slack
- In office 2015–2016
- Prime Minister: David Cameron
- Preceded by: Jean-Christophe Gray

Personal details
- Born: Helen Alice Bower; 1978 (age 47–48) Birmingham
- Education: Edgbaston High School for Girls
- Alma mater: Cardiff University
- Occupation: Civil servant

Helen Alice Bower-Easton CBE (born 1978) is a British civil servant who was the first woman to serve as the Prime Minister's Official Spokesperson. She became Director of Communications at the Foreign and Commonwealth Office moving on to the Financial Conduct Authority in a similar role.

== Life ==
Helen Bower was born in Birmingham, the daughter of John and Diana Bower. She was educated at Edgbaston High School for Girls and Cardiff University, graduating in 2001 with a BA in Economics and EU Studies with French and Italian.

Bower entered the Civil Service in 2003. In June 2015 she was appointed Official Spokesperson to the Prime Minister, the first woman to be appointed to the post. In August 2016 she was conferred a CBE in David Cameron's resignation honours list. In September 2016 the Evening Standard included her in its list of London's 1,000 most influential people. In December 2016 she left No. 10 to take up the job of Director of Communications at the Foreign Office.

Government offices
Preceded by Jean-Christophe Gray	Prime Minister's Official Spokesperson; 2015–2017	Succeeded by James Slack
