= Ian Patrick =

Private Secretary to The Prince of Wales (born 1978)

Ian Patrick MBE

Private Secretary to the Prince of Wales
- Incumbent
- Assumed office March 2024
- Preceded by: Jean-Christophe Gray

Personal details
- Born: July 1978 (age 47)

Ian John Patrick MBE (born July 1978) has been the Private Secretary to the Prince of Wales since March 2024.

== Career ==
He was previously the Private Secretary to the High Representative for Bosnia and Herzegovina when Lord Ashdown occupied the role, working with Edward Llewellyn. Patrick had been Ashdown's Private Secretary from 1998 to 2002, prior to going to Bosnia, and features in Lord Ashdown's autobiography, A Fortunate Life, which he encouraged Ashdown to write. Patrick was an executor of Lord Ashdown's estate following his death, organised his memorial service at Westminster Abbey, spoke at his funeral and gave a tribute to Ashdown at the 2019 Liberal Democrats Party conference. For his work in Bosnia, Patrick was appointed MBE in the 2006 New Year Honours List. After his time with Ashdown, Patrick joined the Foreign and Commonwealth Office; he left in 2015 and was a special adviser to Sir John Sawers. He is a trustee of The Royal Foundation, The Earthshot Prize, and Crohn's and Colitis UK.

Patrick became the Prince of Wales' Private Secretary in March 2024, advising on all official and private matters.

Court offices
Preceded by Jean-Christophe Gray	Private Secretary to the Prince of Wales; 2024–present	Incumbent
