= James Slack =

British journalist and government spokesman

James Slack CBE
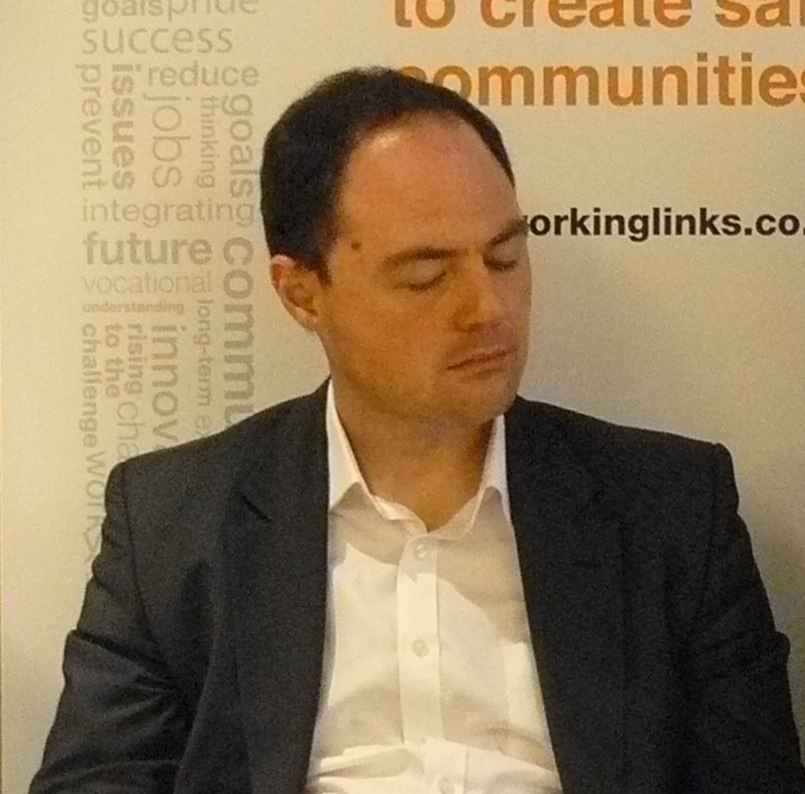
- Slack at Policy Exchange in 2011

Downing Street Director of Communications
- In office 1 January 2021 – 19 March 2021
- Prime Minister: Boris Johnson
- Preceded by: Lee Cain
- Succeeded by: Jack Doyle

Prime Minister's Official Spokesperson
- In office 10 February 2017 – 31 December 2020
- Prime Minister: Theresa May; Boris Johnson
- Preceded by: Helen Bower
- Succeeded by: Max Blain

James Slack CBE is a British political advisor and journalist who served as Downing Street Director of Communications for Prime Minister Boris Johnson between January and March 2021.

== Career ==
Previously home affairs editor of the Daily Mail, he was appointed political editor of the newspaper in October 2015 in succession to James Chapman, who had been appointed as spokesman for George Osborne, then Chancellor of the Exchequer.

At the Daily Mail, as home affairs editor, Slack was involved in the campaign to stop Gary McKinnon, who has Asperger syndrome, from being extradited to the United States to face charges relating to computer hacking.

Slack wrote the controversial "Enemies of the People" front-page article on 4 November 2016 which criticised senior judges in England's High Court of Justice who had made a decision the Daily Mail did not agree with.

At the end of January 2017 it appeared that Slack was to be appointed as the Prime Minister's Official Spokesperson, which was confirmed on 10 February 2017. He remained in the post after Boris Johnson took over the government on 24 July 2019.

Slack was appointed a Commander of the Order of the British Empire in Theresa May's resignation honours list for public service.

Following the announcement that the then-Downing Street Director of Communications, Lee Cain, had resigned from government and would leave his post at the end of December 2020 it was confirmed that Slack would assume this position in the new year.

In March 2021, it was announced that he was leaving Downing Street to join The Sun as deputy editor in succession to Keith Poole. He was replaced as Director of Communications by Jack Doyle, a former Daily Mail associate editor for politics.

On 13 January 2022, The Daily Telegraph reported on two parties alleged to have been held at 10 Downing Street in April 2021, on the eve of the funeral of Prince Philip, Duke of Edinburgh, when the UK was observing a period of national mourning following the Duke's death the previous week, and as England remained in step two lockdown restrictions, where people were only permitted to meet up outdoors. These were leaving events for Slack and for a photographer. The next day, Slack and Downing Street confirmed there was an event, with Slack apologising for what happened.

== See also ==
- Westminster lockdown parties controversy

Media offices
Preceded by James Chapman	Political Editor of the Daily Mail; 2015–2017	Succeeded by Jason Groves
Preceded by Keith Poole	Deputy Editor of The Sun; 2021–present	Incumbent
Government offices
Preceded by Helen Bower	Prime Minister's Official Spokesperson; 2017–2020	Succeeded by Jamie Davis; Acting
Preceded by Lee Cain	Downing Street Director of Communications; 2021	Succeeded by Jack Doyle
