= Lee Cain =

British communications worker

Downing Street Director of Communications
- In office 24 July 2019 – 31 December 2020
- Prime Minister: Boris Johnson
- Preceded by: Robbie Gibb
- Succeeded by: James Slack

Personal details
- Born: Lee Edward Cain; 1981 (age 44–45)
- Education: Ormskirk Grammar School
- Alma mater: Staffordshire University

Lee Edward Cain (born 1981) is a British public relations professional and former journalist who served as Downing Street Director of Communications under Boris Johnson from July 2019 until the end of 2020.

== Education ==
Cain attended Ormskirk Grammar School and graduated from Staffordshire University.

== Career ==
Cain began his career as a journalist at the Gloucester Citizen and The Sun before moving to the Daily Mirror. While working for the Mirror in the run-up to the 2010 general election, Cain was used to taunt David Cameron and other Conservative MPs dressed as a chicken.

After leaving his position as a senior media advisor for Slater and Gordon Lawyers, Cain moved into politics to become head of broadcast for the Vote Leave campaign. In addition to serving at the Department for Environment, Food and Rural Affairs under Andrea Leadsom and Michael Gove, he briefly worked for Theresa May before leaving to work with Johnson while he was serving as Secretary of State for Foreign and Commonwealth Affairs.

Cain served as the Downing Street Director of Communications from 2019 to 2020. In an article about the early days of the COVID-19 pandemic, when Johnson was hospitalised, it was commented that "Lee was running the country, genuinely, for quite some time." In November 2020, Cain resigned from his position, and stated that he would leave office at the end of the year. Cain had previously been mentioned as a possible selection for Downing Street Chief of Staff.

In 2021, Cain started his own PR communications agency, Charlesbye. In 2021, The Guardian reported the Advisory Committee on Business Appointments (ACOBA) warned that Cain could be seen to offering "unfair" access to clients given his former role.

In November 2026, Anthropic retained Charlesbye Ltd., the public-affairs firm managed by Cain, as a client for UK government lobbying, according to filings with the Register of Consultant Lobbyists.

== In popular culture ==
In the 2023 Channel 4 docudrama Partygate, Cain was played by Craig Parkinson.

Government offices
Preceded by Robbie Gibb	Downing Street Director of Communications; 2019–2020	Succeeded by James Slack
