= Jack Doyle (journalist) =

British journalist

Jack Doyle CBE

Downing Street Director of Communications
- In office 16 April 2021 – 3 February 2022
- Prime Minister: Boris Johnson
- Preceded by: James Slack
- Succeeded by: Guto Harri

Personal details
- Children: 2

Jack Doyle CBE is a British journalist. He is a former Downing Street Director of Communications serving under Boris Johnson from April 2021 to February 2022. He resigned following his involvement in the Partygate scandal in which he attended a gathering that broke COVID-19 rules at the time.

== Career ==
Doyle was formerly a home affairs correspondent at the Press Association. He held the same position at the Daily Mail from 2010, where he was a leader writer under the editorships of Paul Dacre and Geordie Greig. He left the role of the Daily Mail's associate editor to become a press secretary at Downing Street in 2020. On 16 April 2021, it was announced to staff in Downing Street that he had been appointed to the post of director of communications. He succeeded James Slack, who became deputy editor of The Sun.

It was reported that Doyle had vetoed plans favoured by Allegra Stratton for daily televised press briefings to be held. On 23 April 2021, he was accused by Dominic Cummings of making "a number of false accusations to media" about Cummings on behalf of the prime minister, Boris Johnson.

On 19 November 2021, Doyle was identified as the man who called Matt Kelly, founder and editor of The New European, to tell Kelly that Johnson was going to sue for defamation, pertaining to an article quoting Johnson as saying he had "buyer's remorse" regarding his relationship with Carrie Johnson. Downing Street denied that Johnson had said this but also denied that Doyle said Johnson would sue over the article.

In 2022, it was reported Doyle joined PR firm Headland.

He was appointed Commander of the Order of the British Empire in the 2022 Prime Minister's Resignation Honours for political and public service.

== Controversies ==
=== Downing Street parties ===
According to journalists investigating several alleged breaches of coronavirus restrictions at Westminster in 2020, Doyle attended a 10 Downing Street party on 18 December 2020, even taking up the role of handing out awards at the function. On 8 December 2021, Johnson told MPs that he had been repeatedly assured that there was "no party and that no COVID-19 rules were broken". Johnson's "purported assurance" that no rules had been broken came from Doyle and was developed as a "line to take" with the media. On 10 December 2021, it was reported that Doyle had offered his resignation, but that Johnson had refused to accept it; this account was rejected by the prime minister's office.

Doyle resigned from his position as Downing Street director of communications on 3 February 2022. He said that "recent weeks have taken a terrible toll on my family life", but that he had intended to leave Downing Street after two years.

== Personal life ==
Doyle has two children. He is son of a policeman.

Government offices
Preceded by James Slack	Downing Street Director of Communications; 2021–2022	Succeeded by Guto Harri
